= Jizera Dark-Sky Park =

Dark-sky preserve in Poland and the Czech Republic

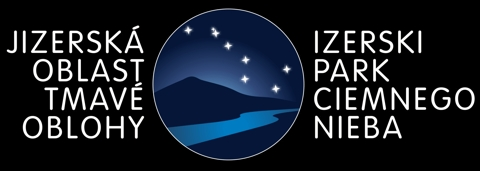
- Interactive map of Jizera Dark-Sky Park
- Nearest city: (Poland) Świeradów-Zdrój (Czech Republic) Harrachov
- Established: 4 November 2009

The Jizera Dark-Sky Park (Polish: Izerski Park Ciemnego Nieba – IPCN, Czech: Jizerská oblast tmavé oblohy – JOTO) is the first transnational dark-sky preserve. It is located in a nearly-uninhabited region of the Jizera Mountains that lies halfway between Poland and the Czech Republic. The park primarily serves to inform the general public about the issue of light pollution, as well as to protect nature and the environment.

== Establishment of the park ==
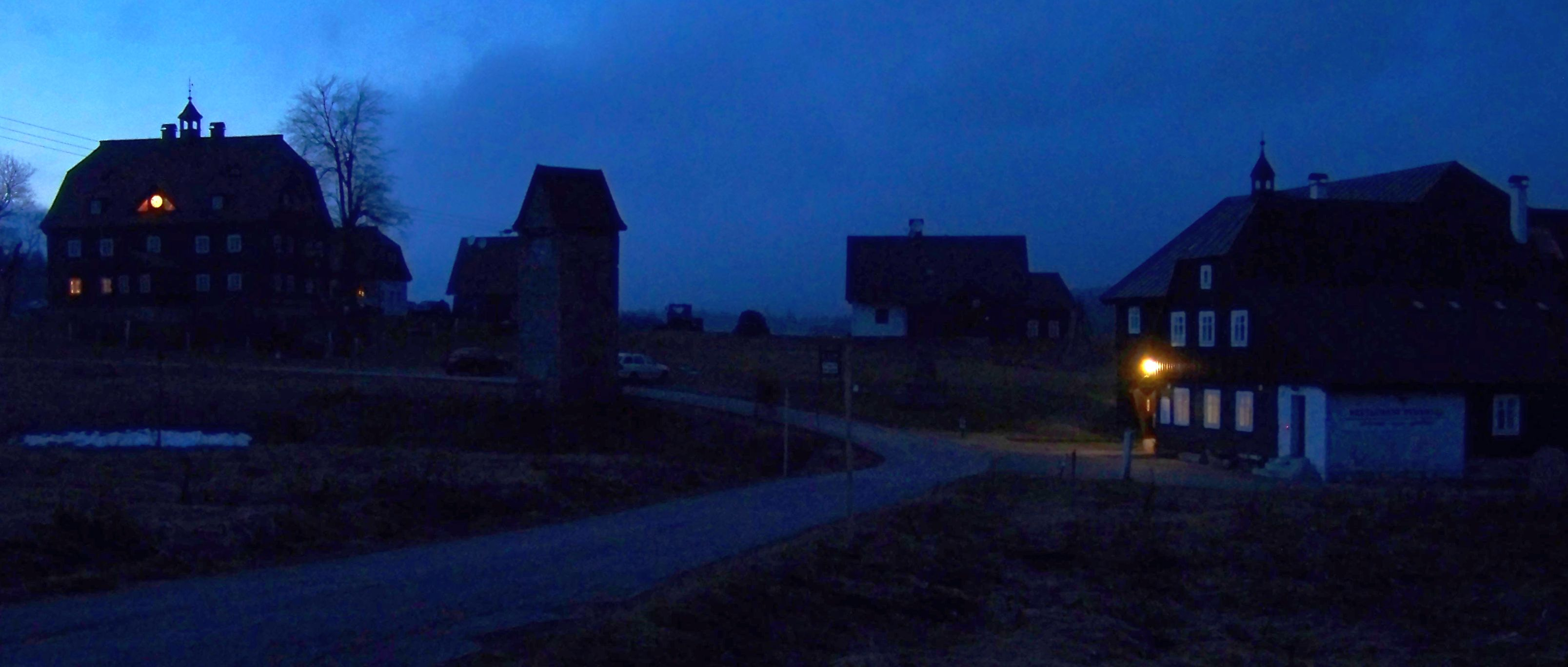
The settlement of Jizerka (Pyramid Manor and Hotel) at dusk. There is no public lighting in the settlement.

The initiative to create a dark-sky preserve in the Jizera Mountains came from the Astronomical Institute of the University of Wrocław in Poland. It was joined by other institutions, namely the Astronomical Institute of the Czech Academy of Sciences, the Nature Conservation Agency of the Czech Republic, the administration of the Jizera Mountains Protected Area, the Świeradów Zdroj Forest District, the Szklarska Poreba Forest District, the state enterprise Lesy České republiky (lit. 'Forests of the Czech Republic'), and the regional directorate of Liberec. On 4 November 2009, as part of the United Nations' International Year of Astronomy, these institutions jointly declared the Jizera Dark Sky Region.

== Location and purpose ==
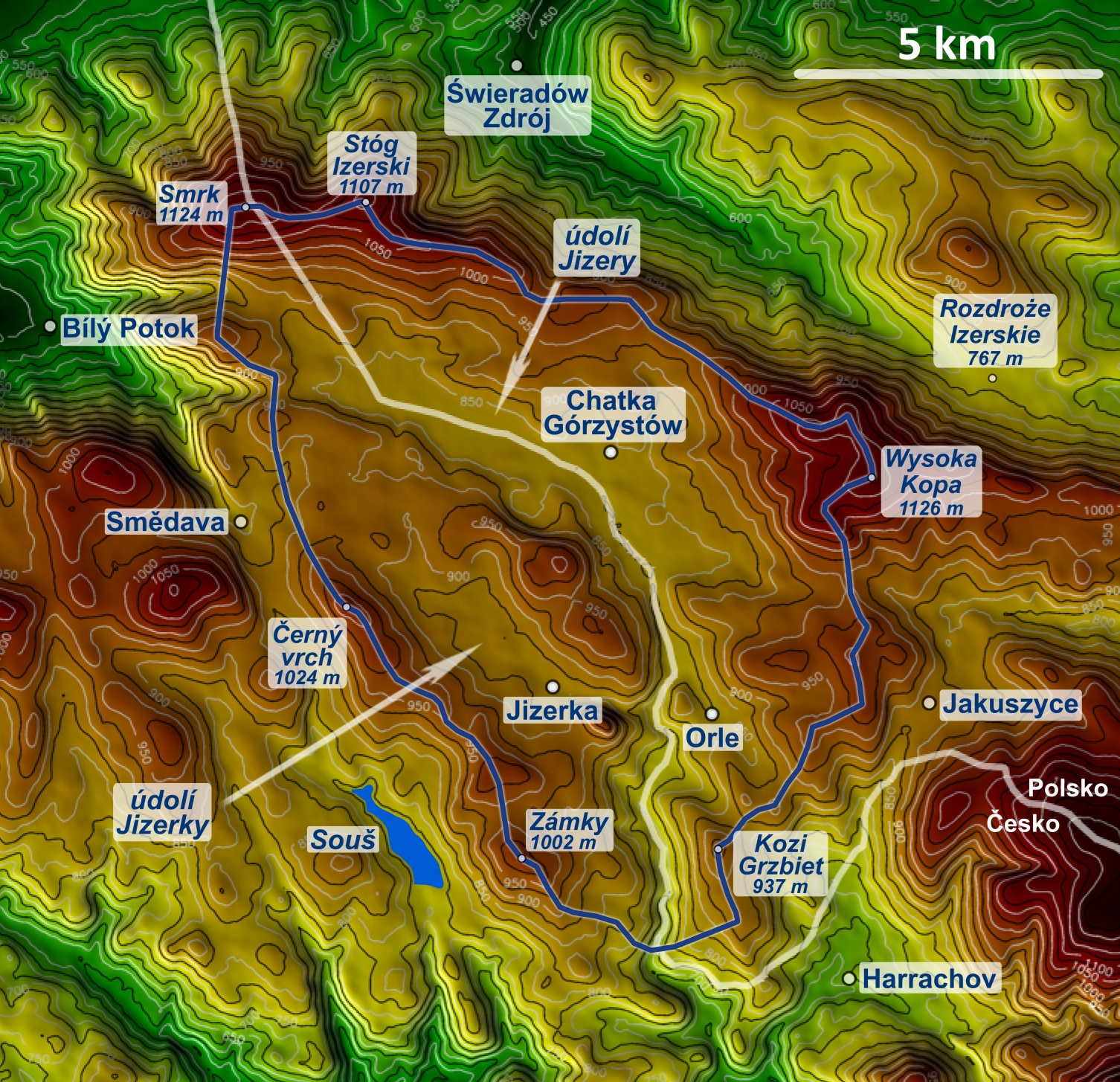
Map of the Jizera Dark-Sky Park

The Jizera region of dark skies covers an area of almost 75 square kilometres (29 sq mi). It is located in a nearly uninhabited part of the Jizera Mountains and lies halfway between the Czech and Polish sides of the mountain range. On the Czech side, it stretches from the settlement of Jizerka to Mount Smrk, while in Poland it continues along the High Jizera ridge and surrounds the Jizera Meadow and the settlement of Orle.

The park has several functions. Above all, it informs the general public about the issue of light pollution by showcasing its night sky as much darker than the sky in cities and their surroundings. Another important function is the protection of nature and the environment. The park hosts a number of astronomical events for the public such as lectures and sky observations, in which the Club of Astronomers of the Liberec region branch of the Czech Astronomical Society and other institutions take part. On the Polish side, the park is part of the astro-tourism project Astro Izery.

=== Darkness ===
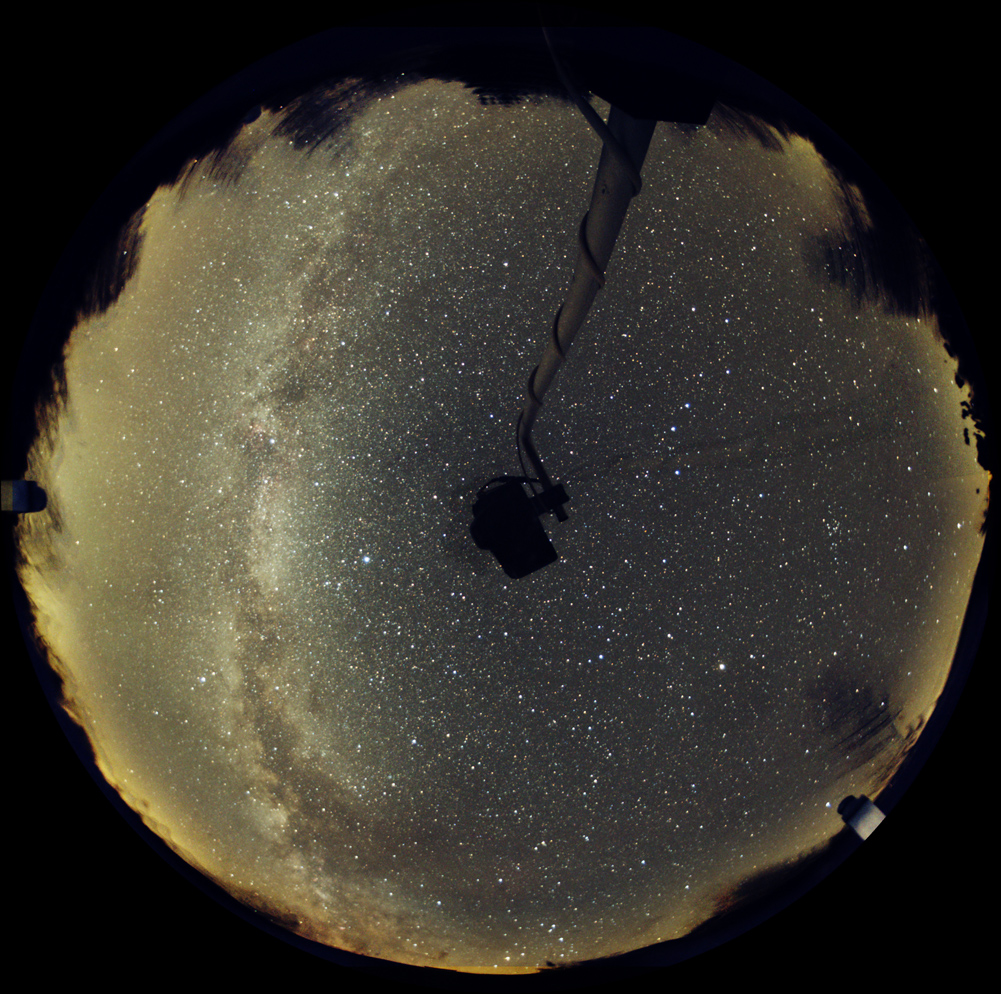
The dark sky above the Jizera region. At its zenith the sky is dark, but along the horizon the light from distant cities is visible.

Although the night sky in the Jizera dark sky region is significantly darker than in the cities, it is not as naturally dark as it would be with no light from Earth. The influence of light pollution from cities stretches tens of kilometers away. The brightness of the sky in Jizerka is approximately twice as high as a naturally dark sky without the influence of light pollution. Naturally dark night skies effectively do not occur in the densely populated Central Europe region. The most prominent sources of light pollution that can be seen from the area are the cities of Liberec, Jablonec nad Nisou and Jelenia Góra. The sky quality of that park expressed by the Bortle scale is at level 4, and reaches level 3 under exceptionally good conditions.
