= Kwisa =

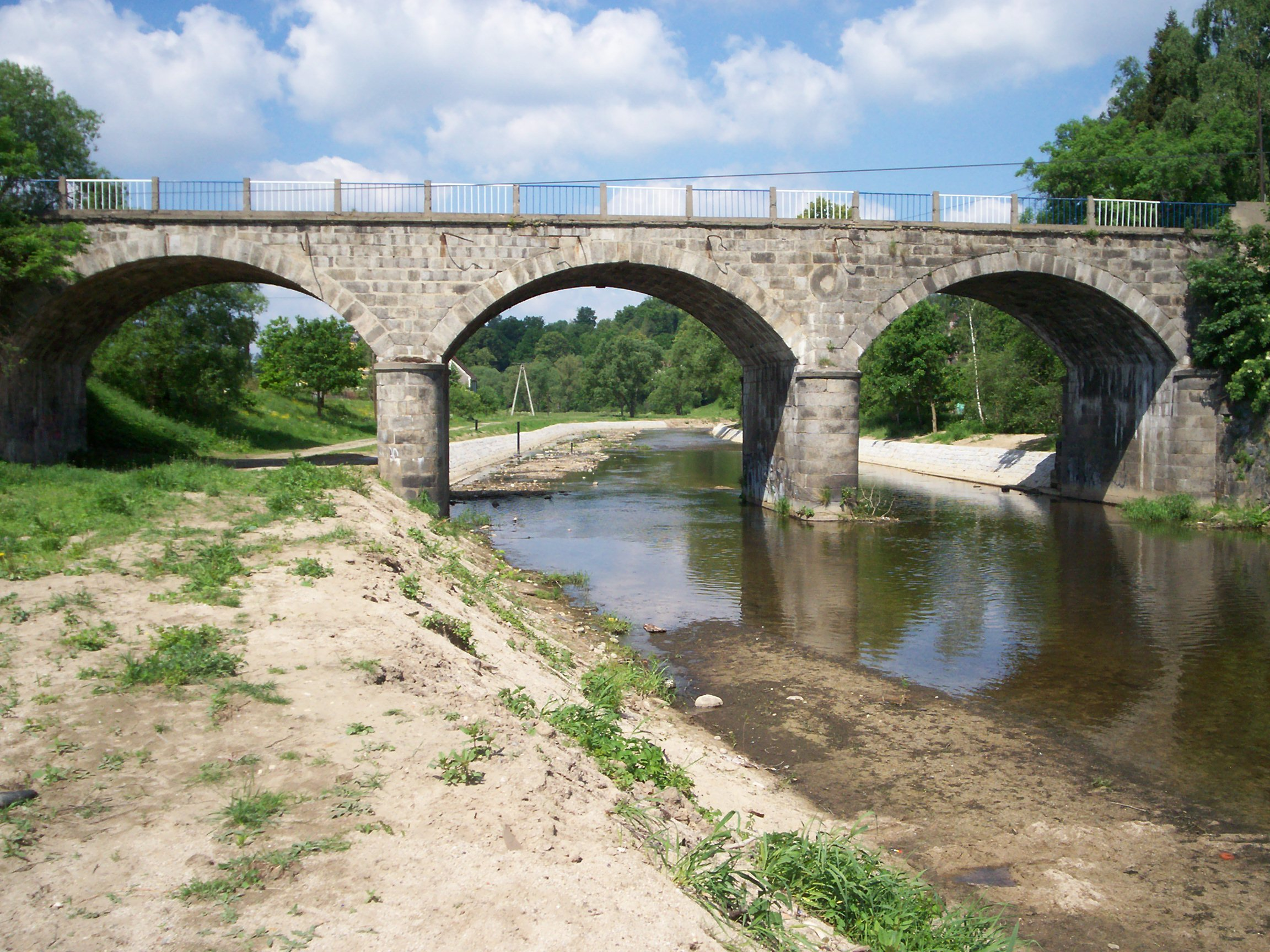
- Bridge at Gryfów Śląski

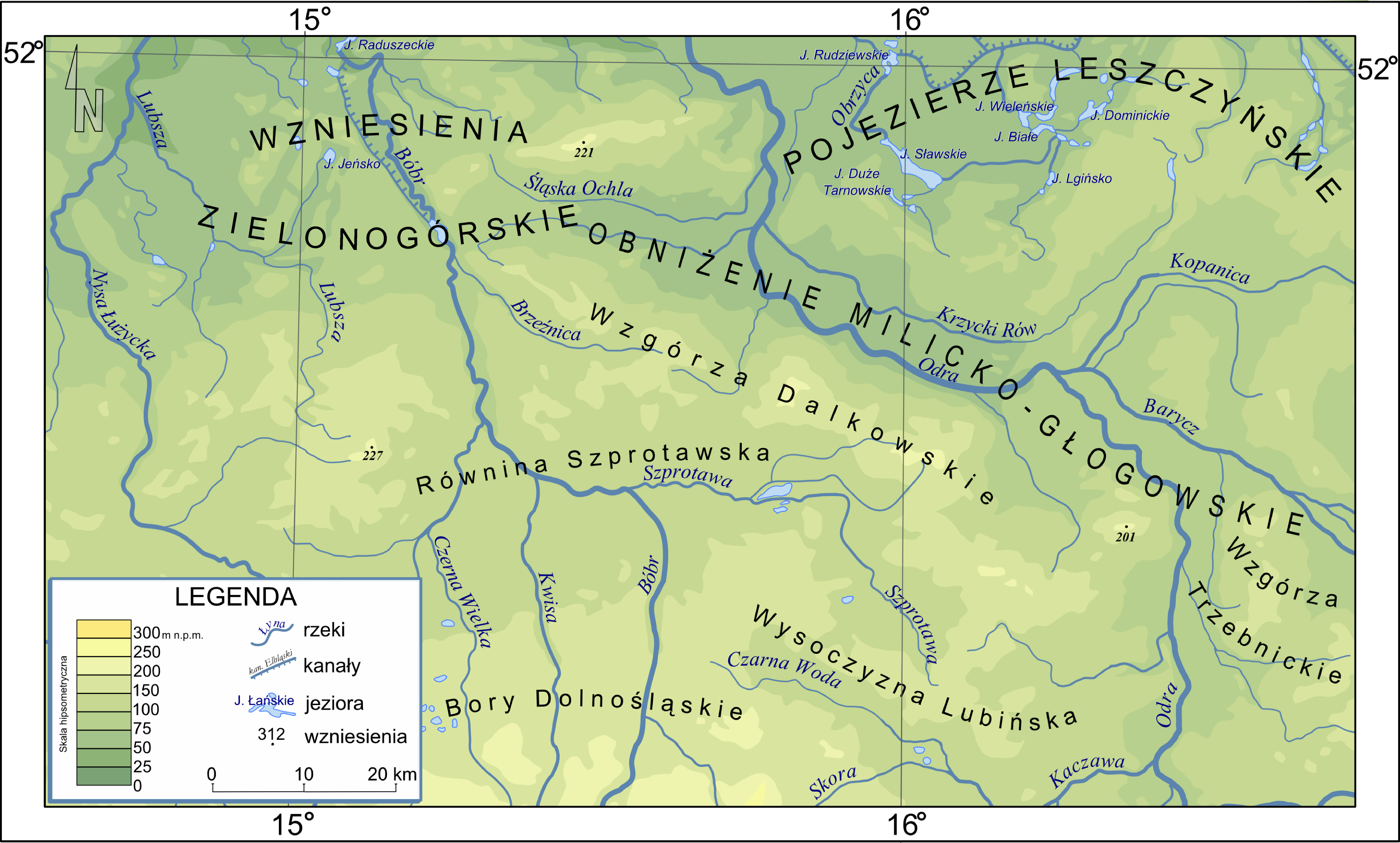
- Confluence of Kwisa and Bóbr

Location
- Country: Poland
- Region: Lower Silesian Voivodeship, Lubusz Voivodeship

Physical characteristics
- Source: Izerskie Garby, Jizera Mountains; 50°51′8″N 15°24′9″E
- Mouth: Bóbr at Żelisław; 51°34′33″N 15°23′39″E
- Length: 127 km (79 mi)
- Basin size: 1,026 km^{2} (396 sq mi)

Basin features
- Progression: Bóbr→ Oder→ Baltic Sea

The Kwisa [ˈkfʲisa] (German: Queis, Upper Sorbian: Hwizdź, pronounced [ˈhwʲistʃ]) is a river in south-western Poland, a left tributary of the Bóbr, which itself is a left tributary of the Oder river.

It rises in the Jizera Mountains, part of the Western Sudetes range, where it runs along the border with the Czech Republic. At the slope of the Smrk massif it turns northwards, flowing past the towns of Świeradów-Zdrój, Mirsk, Gryfów Śląski, Leśna, where it is dammed at the Lake Leśnia reservoir, to Lubań, Nowogrodziec and Kliczków. It finally joins the Bóbr river approximately 2 kilometres (1.2 mi) north-west of Małomice and 5 km (3.1 mi) south-east of Żagań. For most of its length it is in Lower Silesian Voivodeship, but it also flows through Lubusz Voivodeship for several kilometres before reaching its mouth.

== Border river ==
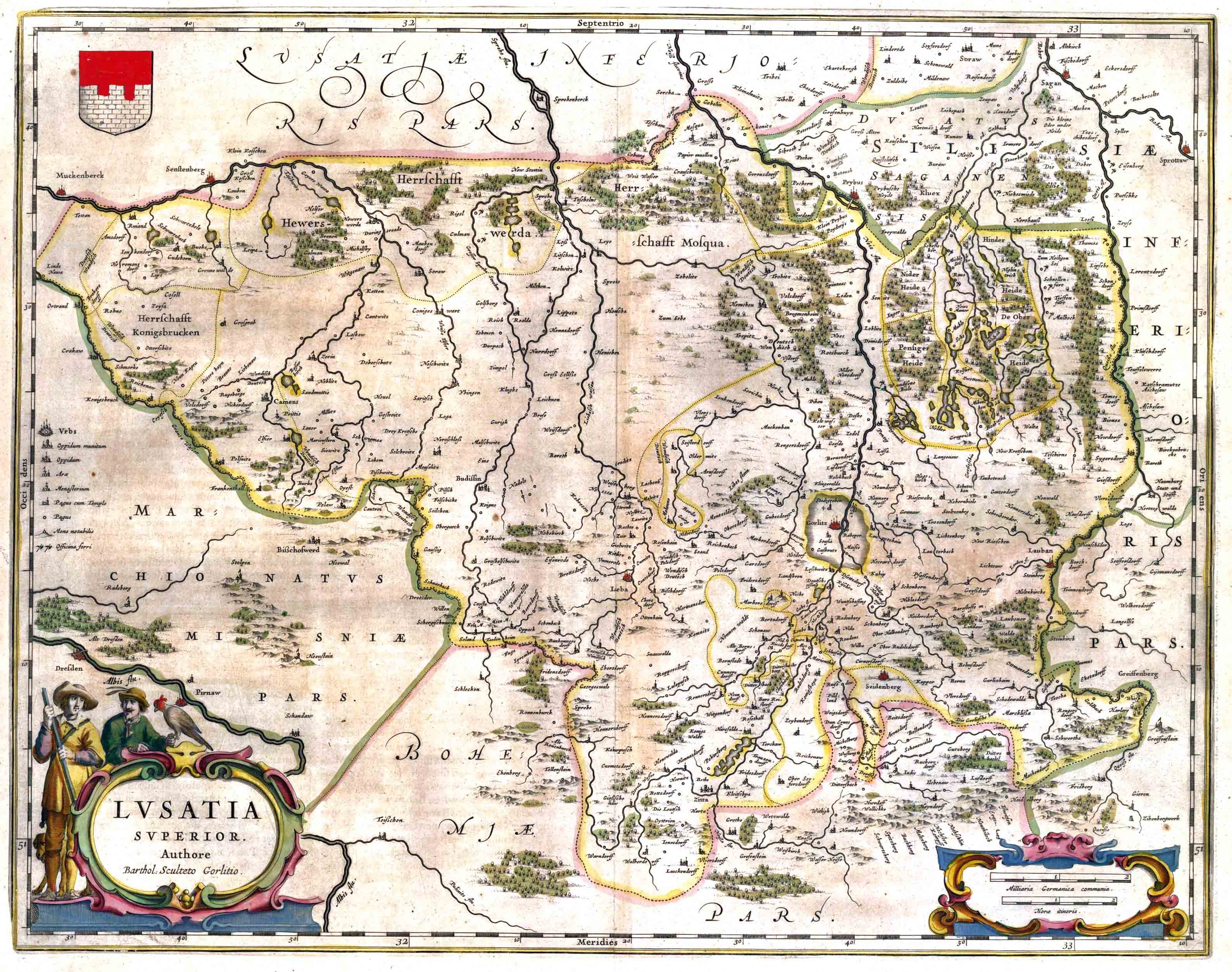
Map of Upper Lusatia (Joan Blaeu, 1635) shows the Queiß(e) Fl(uvius), now Kwisa marking its eastern border

From about 937 the southeastern outskirts of the Saxon Marca Geronis, established in the conquered lands settled by the West Slavic Milceni tribes, reached to the left banks of the Queiß-Kwisa. After the partition of the march in 965, the lands west of the river belonged to the Imperial Margravate of Meissen, while the adjacent territory to the east was gradually incorporated into the Silesian region recently conquered by of the Early Polish state under the Piast duke Mieszko I until 992. His successor Bolesław I Chrobry further extended the Polish reach of power to the west, campaigning the Milceni lands around Bautzen (Budissin), which after several years of German–Polish struggle Emperor Henry II the Saint ceded to him according to the 1018 Peace of Bautzen.

Nevertheless, the Land Budissin, later called Upper Lusatia, was reconquered by Emperor Conrad II in 1031 and again held by the Meissen margraves until King Henry IV of Germany in 1071 enfeoffed Duke Vratislaus II of Bohemia, his ally in the looming Saxon Rebellion. The Bohemian rule was again confirmed by Emperor Frederick Barbarossa in favour of Duke Vladislaus II in 1158, accompanied by the royal title. Meanwhile, the territory east of the Kwisa had been incorporated into the Polish Duchy of Silesia in 1138, which after the Emperor's 1163 expedition to Poland was held by the Silesian Piast descendants of Duke Władysław II the Exile. From that time on the river marked the border between the historical regions of Lower Silesia—i.e. the Duchy of Legnica from 1248, the Duchy of Jawor from 1274—in the east and Upper Lusatia in the west.

Together with the lower Bóbr, the Kwisa was therefore one of the rivers considered as a possible marker of the Polish–German border after World War II during the negotiations at the 1945 Potsdam Conference, that finally led to the establishment of the Oder–Neisse line about 50 km (30 mi) to the west.
