= Nové Město pod Smrkem =

- Town
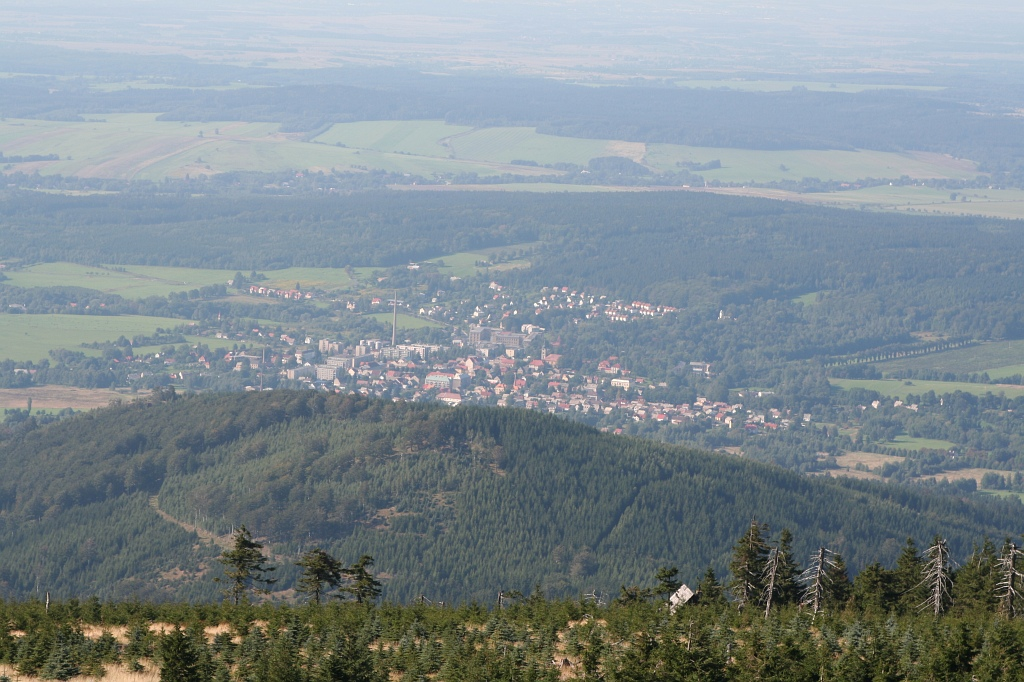
- General view

- Flag Coat of arms

- Location in the Czech Republic
- Coordinates: 50°55′30″N 15°13′46″E
- Country: Czech Republic
- Region: Liberec
- District: Liberec
- Founded: 1584

Government
  - Mayor: Petr Černica

Area
  - Total: 28.93 km^{2} (11.17 sq mi)
- Elevation: 465 m (1,526 ft)

Population (2026-01-01)
  - Total: 3,713
  - Density: 128.3/km^{2} (332.4/sq mi)
- Time zone: UTC+1 (CET)
  - Summer (DST): UTC+2 (CEST)
- Postal code: 463 65
- Website: www.nmps.cz

Nové Město pod Smrkem (Czech pronunciation: [ˈnovɛː ˈmɲɛsto ˈpot smr̩kɛm]; German: Neustadt an der Tafelfichte) is a town in Liberec District in the Liberec Region of the Czech Republic. It has about 3,700 inhabitants. The town is located on the border between the Jizera Foothills and Jizera Mountains, near the border with Poland.

Nové Město pod Smrkem was founded in 1584 and became a town in 1592.

== Administrative division ==
Nové Město pod Smrkem consists of three municipal parts (in brackets population according to the 2021 census):

- Nové Město pod Smrkem (3,122)
- Hajniště (203)
- Ludvíkov pod Smrkem (171)

== Etymology ==
The name means 'new town below Smrk' in Czech.

== Geography ==
Nové Město pod Smrkem is located about 20 kilometres (12 mi) northeast of Liberec, on the border with Poland. The northern part of the municipal territory lies in the Jizera Foothills and the southern part extends into the Jizera Mountains. The highest point is a contour line below the top of Smrk at 1,115 m (3,658 ft) above sea level. The built-up area is situated in the valley of the Lomnice Stream.

== History ==
Nové Město pod Smrkem was founded in 1584 by Melchior of Redern and called Nové České Město (German: Böhmisch Neustatt, literally 'new Bohemian town'). There were discovered iron ore and tin veins. In 1592, it received town privileges. From 1901, the town has its current name.

In 1938, the town was annexed by Nazi Germany and administered as a part of the Reichsgau Sudetenland. After World War II, the German-speaking population was expelled.

== Demographics ==
Historical population

Year	Pop.	±%
1869	5,233	—
1880	5,390	+3.0%
1890	5,949	+10.4%
1900	7,289	+22.5%
1910	7,510	+3.0%

Year	Pop.	±%
1921	5,811	−22.6%
1930	5,687	−2.1%
1950	3,352	−41.1%
1961	3,433	+2.4%
1970	3,442	+0.3%

Year	Pop.	±%
1980	3,916	+13.8%
1991	3,883	−0.8%
2001	4,018	+3.5%
2011	3,639	−9.4%
2021	3,496	−3.9%

Source: Censuses

== Transport ==
Nové Město pod Smrkem is the final station of a railway line from Liberec.

== Sights ==
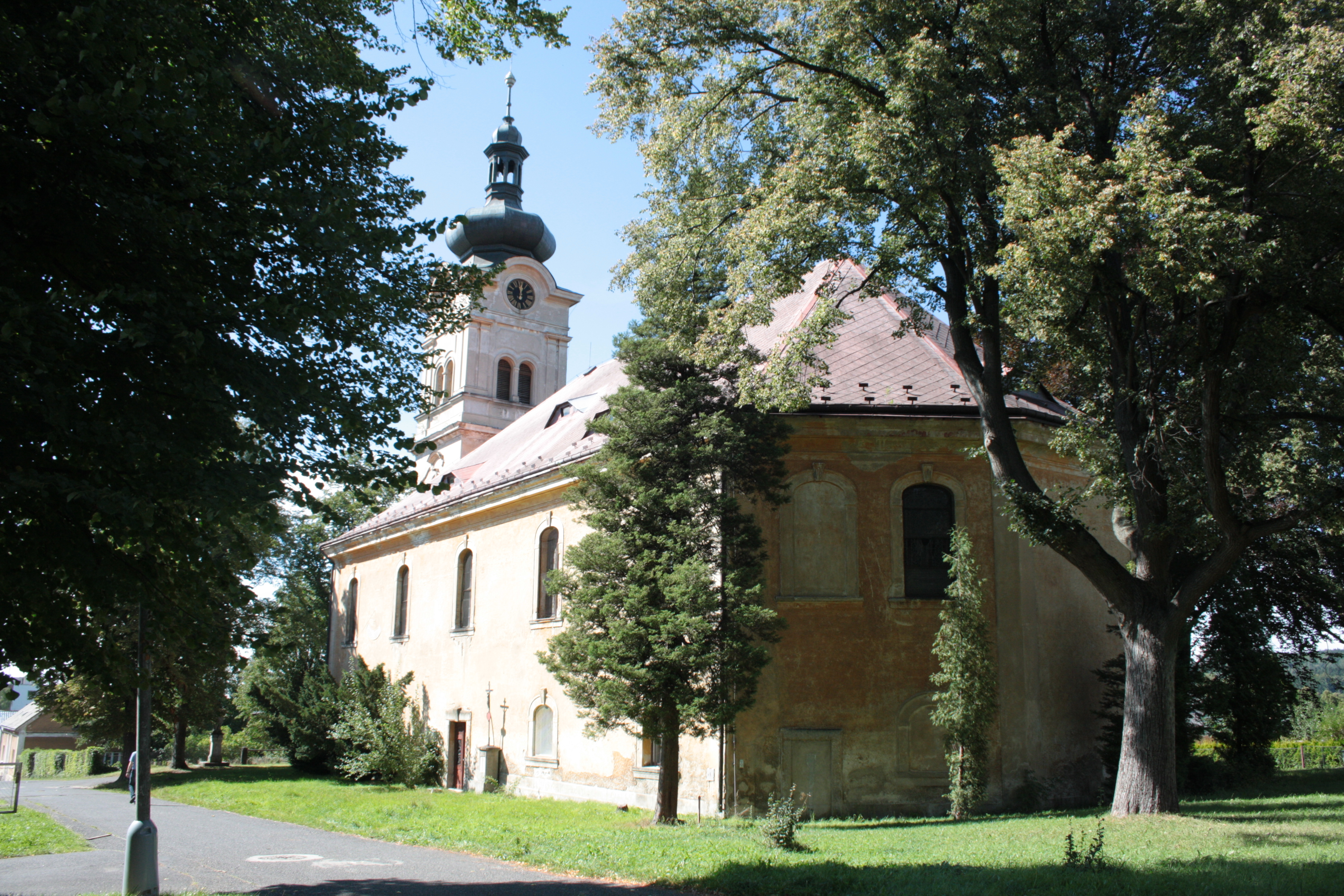
Church of Saint Catherine

The Church of Saint Catherine was founded in 1607 and the tower was added in 1697. The nave was rebuilt to its present form in 1821–1829.

The Church of Saints Peter and Paul is located in Ludvíkov pod Smrkem. It dates from the second half of the 13th century and belongs to the best-preserved building in the region from this period. Modifications were made in the 16th and 18th centuries.

== Notable people ==
- Vincenz Hasak (1812–1889), German Catholic historian
- Alfred Baeumler (1887–1968), German philosopher

== Twin towns – sister cities ==
Nové Město pod Smrkem is twinned with:

- Leśna, Poland
- Mirsk, Poland
- Świeradów-Zdrój, Poland
