= Groß Iser =

Coordinates: 50°51′11″N 15°21′30″E

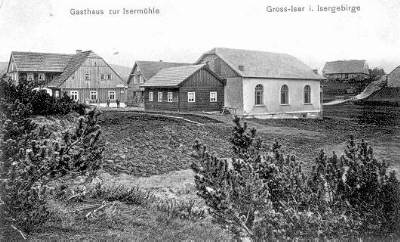
Groß Iser

Groß Iser was a village on Hala Izerska existing from the 17th century until 1945. Today the remains of the village can be found in Poland just by the Czech border (marked here by the Jizera river). The closest towns are Świeradów-Zdrój on the Polish side and Harrachov on the Czech side.

== History ==
=== The beginnings ===
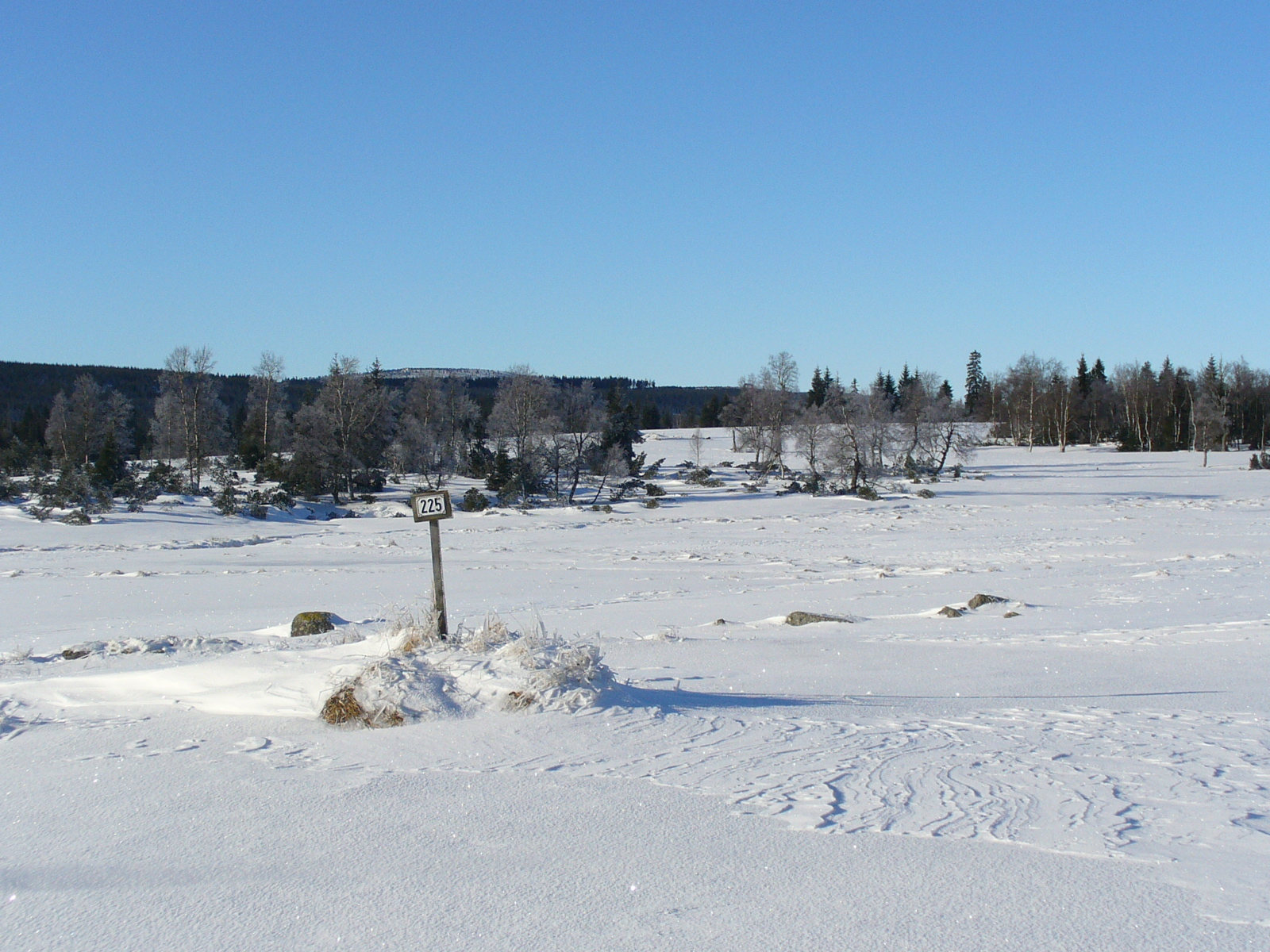
Ruins of Groß Iser in winter

In 1630, a Czech Evangelical refugee became the first person to settle at Hala Izerska. A hut for forest workers was built and, thus, the village came into existence. Development was slow due to the harsh climate and the swampy territory.

Church chronicles from neighbouring Świeradów from 1742 indicated that in Groß Iser there were 20 parishioners. On 9 September 1742, the first Mass was said in the village (by a pastor from Świeradów).

=== The period of highest development ===
In the 19th century the village became popular among the visitors of the health resort in Świeradów, which caused fast development of the settlement. Tourists would visit the village in spring and summer on foot, in winter on cross-country skis. Peat bog from the surrounding moors was used in Świeradów for spa treatment.

In the period of its greatest development 400 people lived in the village. There were 3 bars, mills, so called "church" (in fact a praying building or a chapel), 2 tourist huts (mainly for the health resort visitors), a café, 2 schools, a fire station, and 43 houses.

=== Destruction of Groß Iser ===
On May 10, 1945, the Red Army arrived and begun with destruction of the village. Between June and October 1945 innocent villagers were violently displaced, some were killed (as for example Paul Hirt, owner of Gross Iser Baude). Then Polish soldiers continued with the destruction and by 1960 there were no other buildings left apart from the building of new school. In the mid-1980s the remains of the village were discovered by a group of Polish students. The only building remaining (a partially-destroyed school from Groß Iser) was turned into a students’ hut. It is now called ''Chatka Górzystów'' (the mountain peoples' hut) and it offers sleeping places as well as hot meals.

== Settlers' lives ==
The settlers lived a poor life here. They earned their livings by fishing (trout mainly), keeping sheep and cattle, as well as producing cheese and wool. Men also worked in the woods, cutting the trees. Some were poachers. Today, the three people living there are the caretakers of the students' hut, along with their daughter.
