= Lázně Libverda =

- Municipality
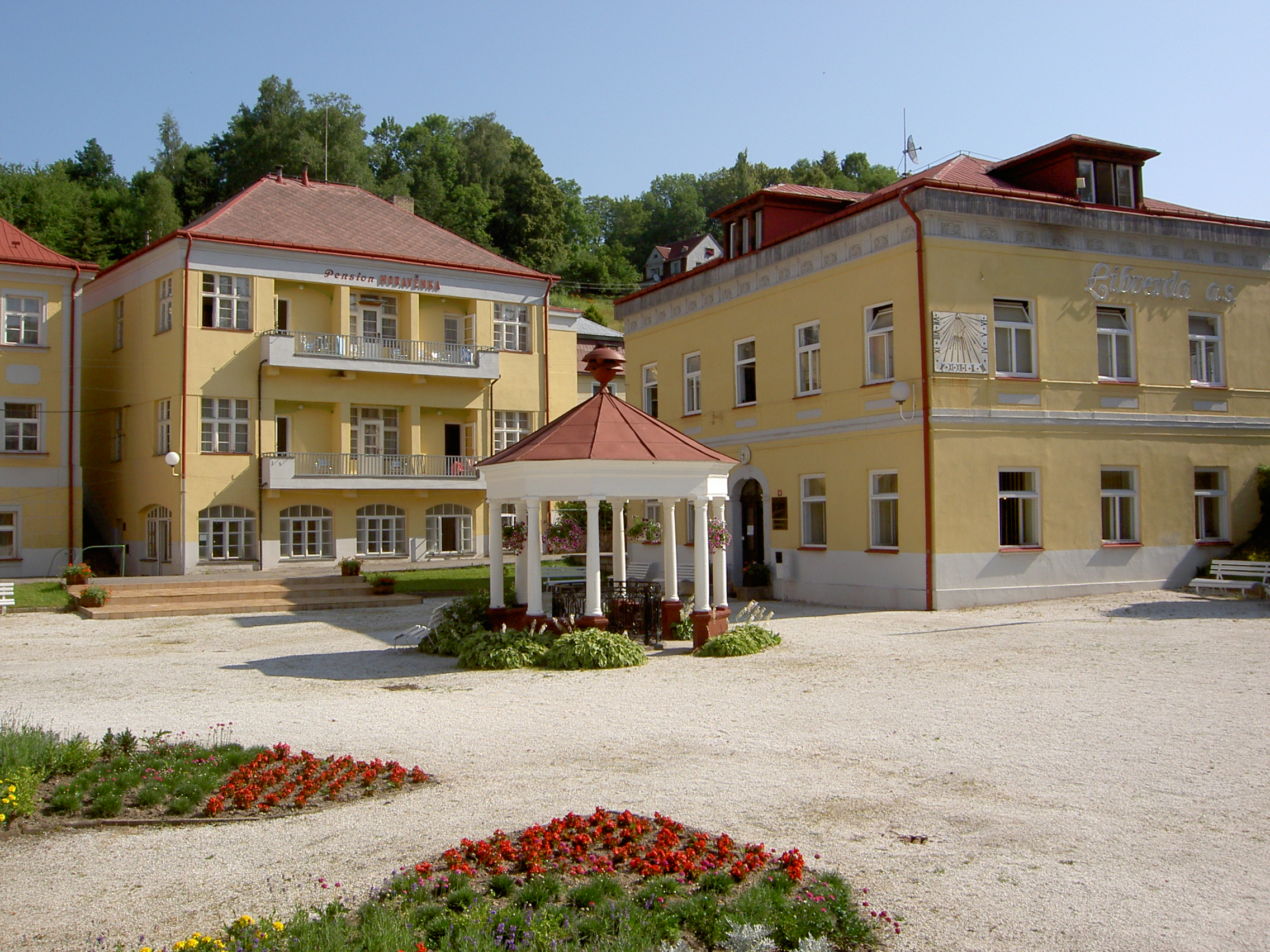
- Libverda Spa

- Flag Coat of arms

- Location in the Czech Republic
- Coordinates: 50°53′25″N 15°11′26″E
- Country: Czech Republic
- Region: Liberec
- District: Liberec
- First mentioned: 1381

Area
  - Total: 13.26 km^{2} (5.12 sq mi)
- Elevation: 424 m (1,391 ft)

Population (2026-01-01)
  - Total: 534
  - Density: 40.3/km^{2} (104/sq mi)
- Time zone: UTC+1 (CET)
  - Summer (DST): UTC+2 (CEST)
- Postal code: 463 62
- Website: www.laznelibverda.cz

Lázně Libverda (German: Bad Liebwerda) is a spa municipality and village in Liberec District in the Liberec Region of the Czech Republic. It has about 500 inhabitants. The municipality is located in the Jizera Mountains, on the border with Poland.

== Etymology ==
The original German name Liebenwerde is an abbreviation of "auf dem Lieben werde", which then meant 'on a lovely island'. The Czech name Libverda was created by transcription.

== Geography ==
Lázně Libverda is located about 16 kilometres (10 mi) northeast of Liberec. It borders Poland in the east.

Lázně Libverda lies in the Jizera Mountains. The highest peak in the municipality and in the whole mountain range is Smrk with 1,124 m (3,688 ft). Part of the Jizerskohorské bučiny National Nature Reserve is located in the southern part of the municipal territory. The stream Libverdský potok flows through the municipality.

== History ==
The first written mention of Lázně Libverda is from 1381, when it was part of the Frýdlant estate.

== Demographics ==
Historical population

Year	Pop.	±%
1869	924	—
1880	849	−8.1%
1890	780	−8.1%
1900	813	+4.2%
1910	795	−2.2%

Year	Pop.	±%
1921	712	−10.4%
1930	719	+1.0%
1950	502	−30.2%
1961	478	−4.8%
1970	450	−5.9%

Year	Pop.	±%
1980	388	−13.8%
1991	389	+0.3%
2001	456	+17.2%
2011	454	−0.4%
2021	449	−1.1%

Source: Censuses

== Spa ==
The healing power of the local spring was first mentioned in 1601 in a report, which stated that the healing effects were known by pilgrims already at the end of the 14th century. In 1785, a new big spring was uncovered, and between 1786 and 1818, several other spring were uncovered. In 1952, the last two spa springs, Kyselka and Nový vrt, were drilled.

== Transport ==
There are no railways or major roads passing through the municipality.

== Sights ==
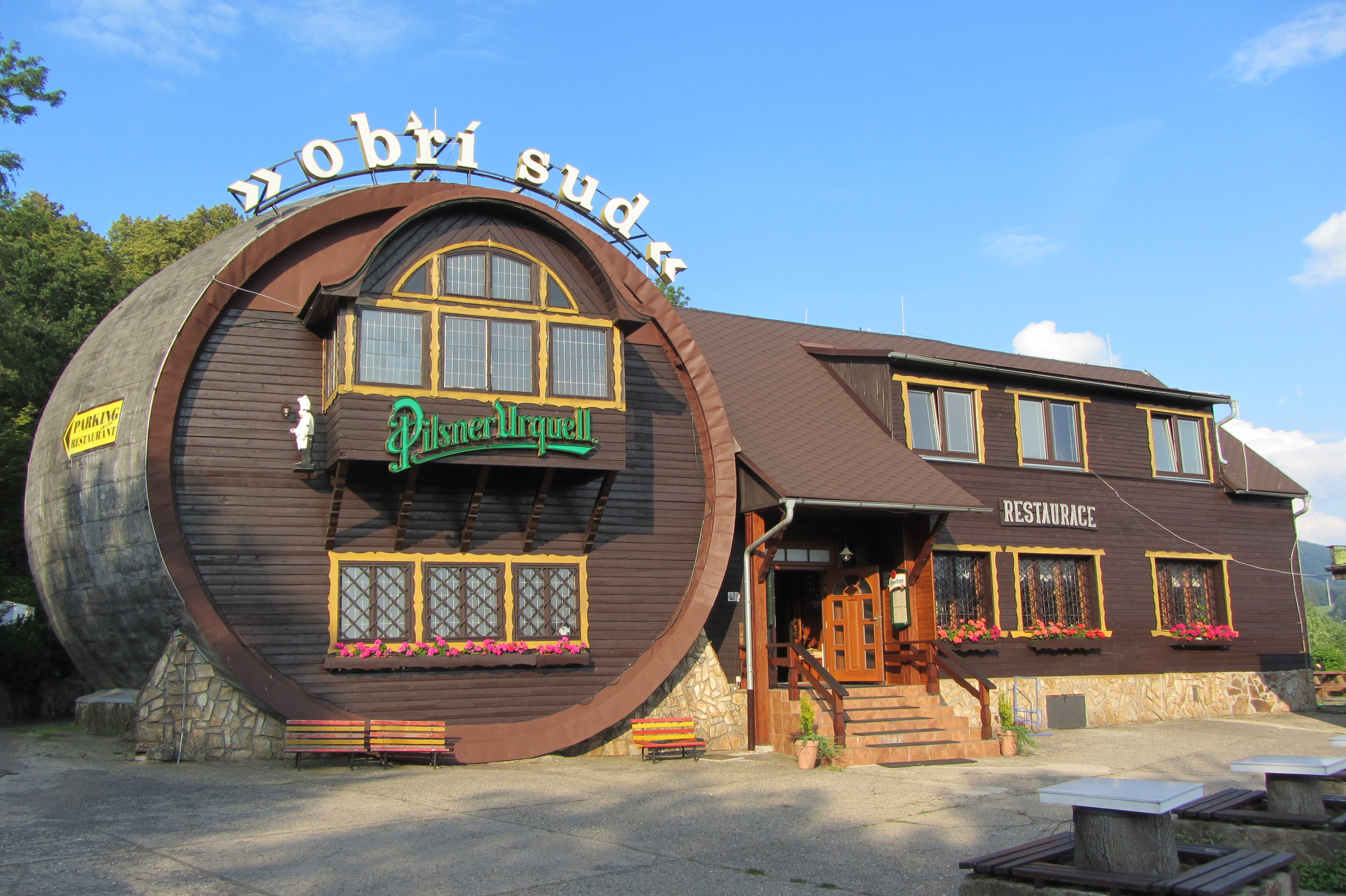
Obří sud Restaurant

The spa are an architecturally valuable and comprehensive set of Neoclassical buildings, built from the second half of the 18th century until 1820. They have preserved their form almost unchanged to this day.

Obří sud (lit. 'giant barrel') is a restaurant located in a real wooden barrel. It was built in 1931. Later, another building was added to the original barrel. The barrel has a length of 14.2 m (47 ft), a height of 11.4 m (37 ft) and a width of 10.5 m (34 ft). The rare restaurant is a symbol of Lázně Libverda.

== Twin towns – sister cities ==
Lázně Libverda is twinned with:

- Mirsk, Poland
- Świeradów-Zdrój, Poland
- Trzebiel, Poland
