= Jizera Meadow =

Montane grassland in Poland

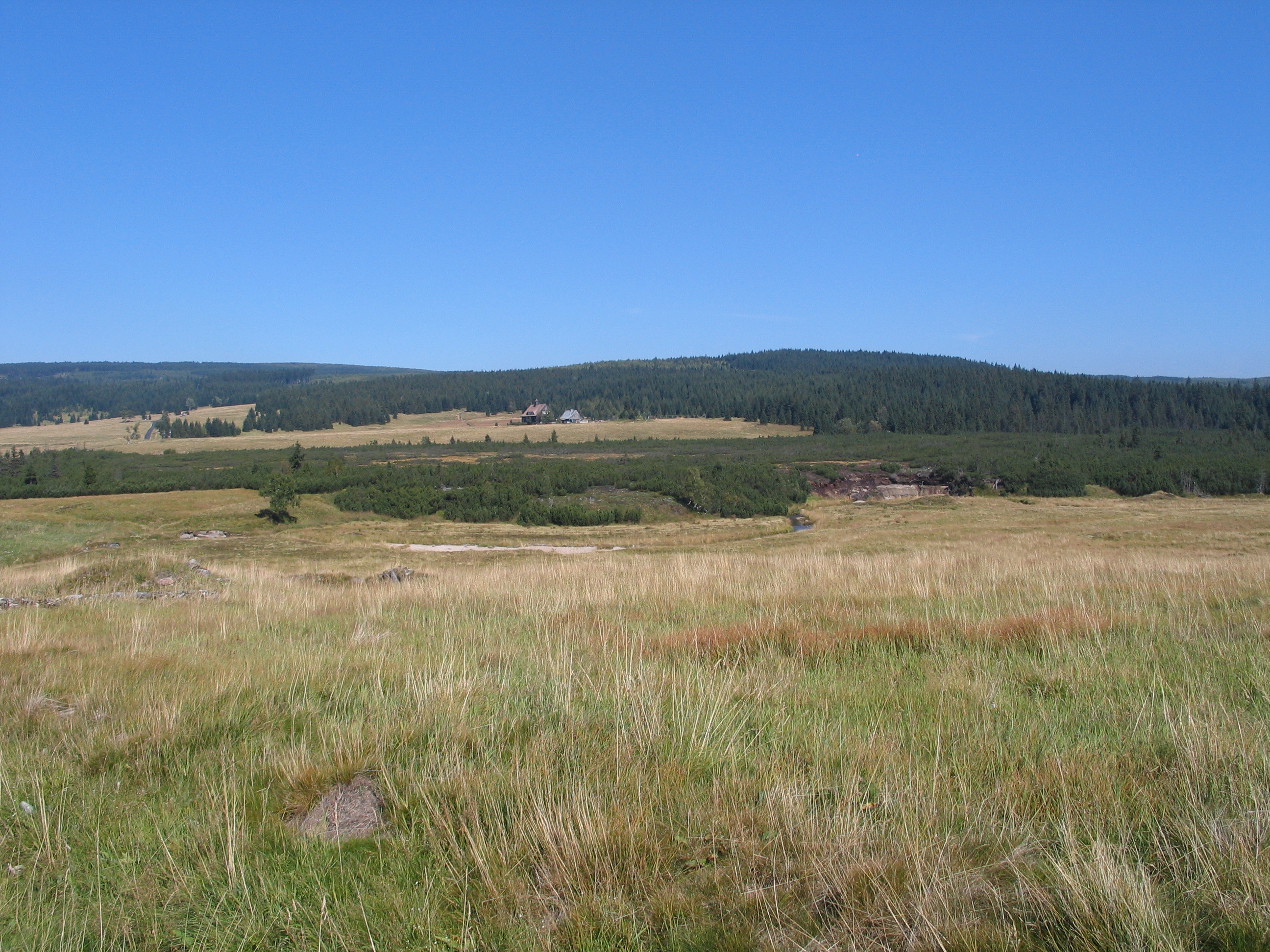
Jizera Meadow, hostel in the distance

The Jizera Meadow (Polish: Izerska Łąka, Czech: Velká Jizerská louka, German: Grosse Iserwiese) is an alpine meadow located at an altitude of 840–880 m above sea level in the valley of the Jizera River in the Jizera Mountains in the Sudetes.

== Climate ==
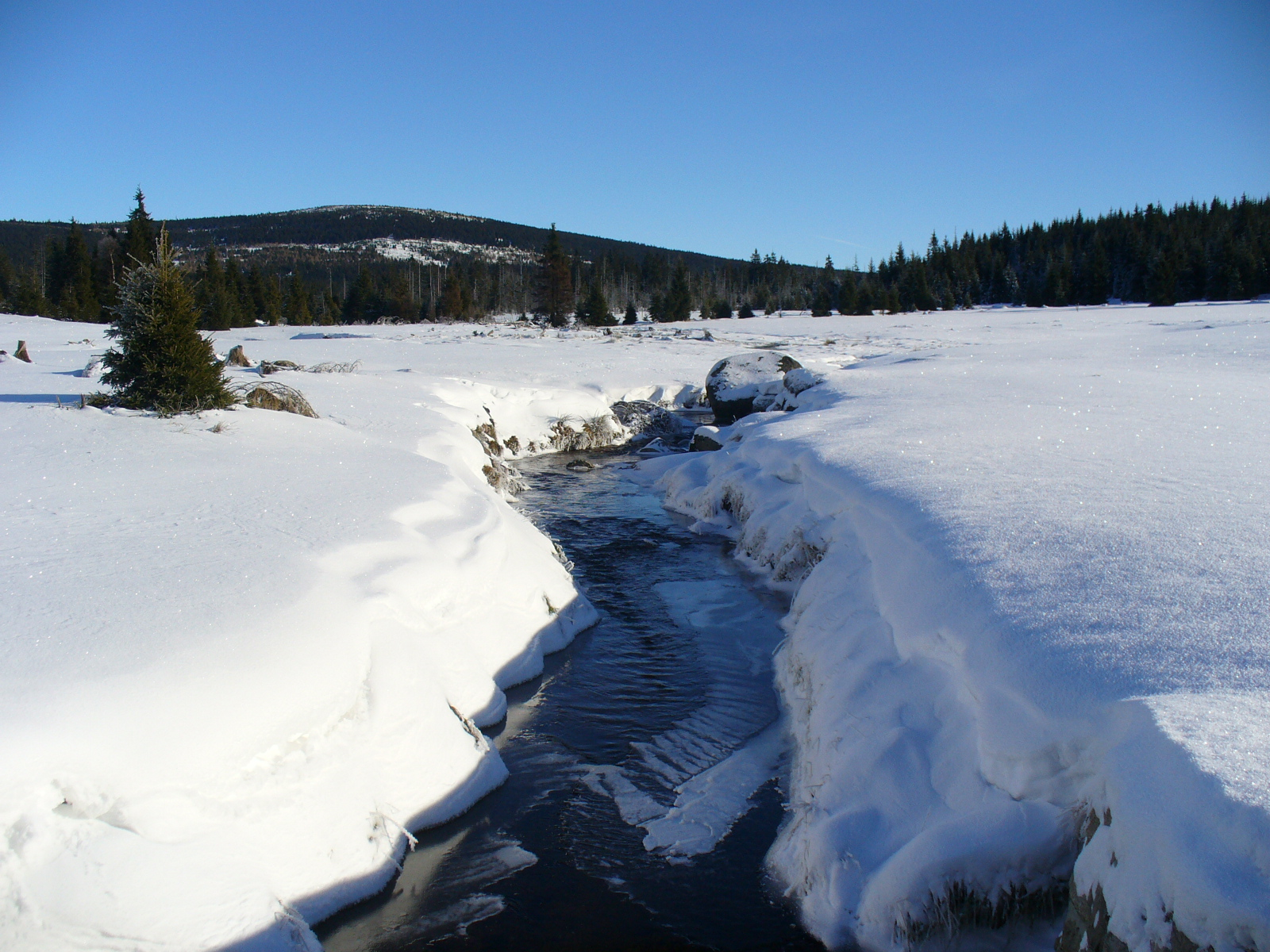
Jizera Meadow in winter - the Polish cold pole

Climatic conditions on the Jizera Meadow are similar to the subalpine level of the Karkonosze 600 m higher, which are caused by the inflow of cool and humid Atlantic air. Negative air temperatures are sometimes recorded there in summer: -5.5 °C (20 July 1996), -1.7 °C (14 August 2012). On December 29, 1996, -36.6 °C and on February 3, 2012, -36 °C were recorded. Negative temperatures are recorded in every month with snow remaining until May. Due to the lowest average annual temperatures the Jizera Meadow is considered to be the Polish cold pole (competing with Puszcza Rękowiańska). Record low temperatures on the Jizera Meadow are the effect of night-time temperature inversion, which occurs when cool air descends from the mountain slopes towards the airtight basin. The annual precipitation is 1500 mm, approximately the same as in the Karkonosze and the Tatra Mountains.

== Nature ==
The Jizera Meadow is home to characteristic peat bog specimens of crowberry, few-flowered sedge, sheathed cottonsedge, and round-leaved sundew. The lowest site of bog pine, one of only two outside the Karkonosze in the Sudety Mountains, is located there. The Meadow partly includes the nature reserve „Jizera Valley Peat Bogs” and is a part of the Ramsar site of the same name under the number 2319.

== Tourism ==
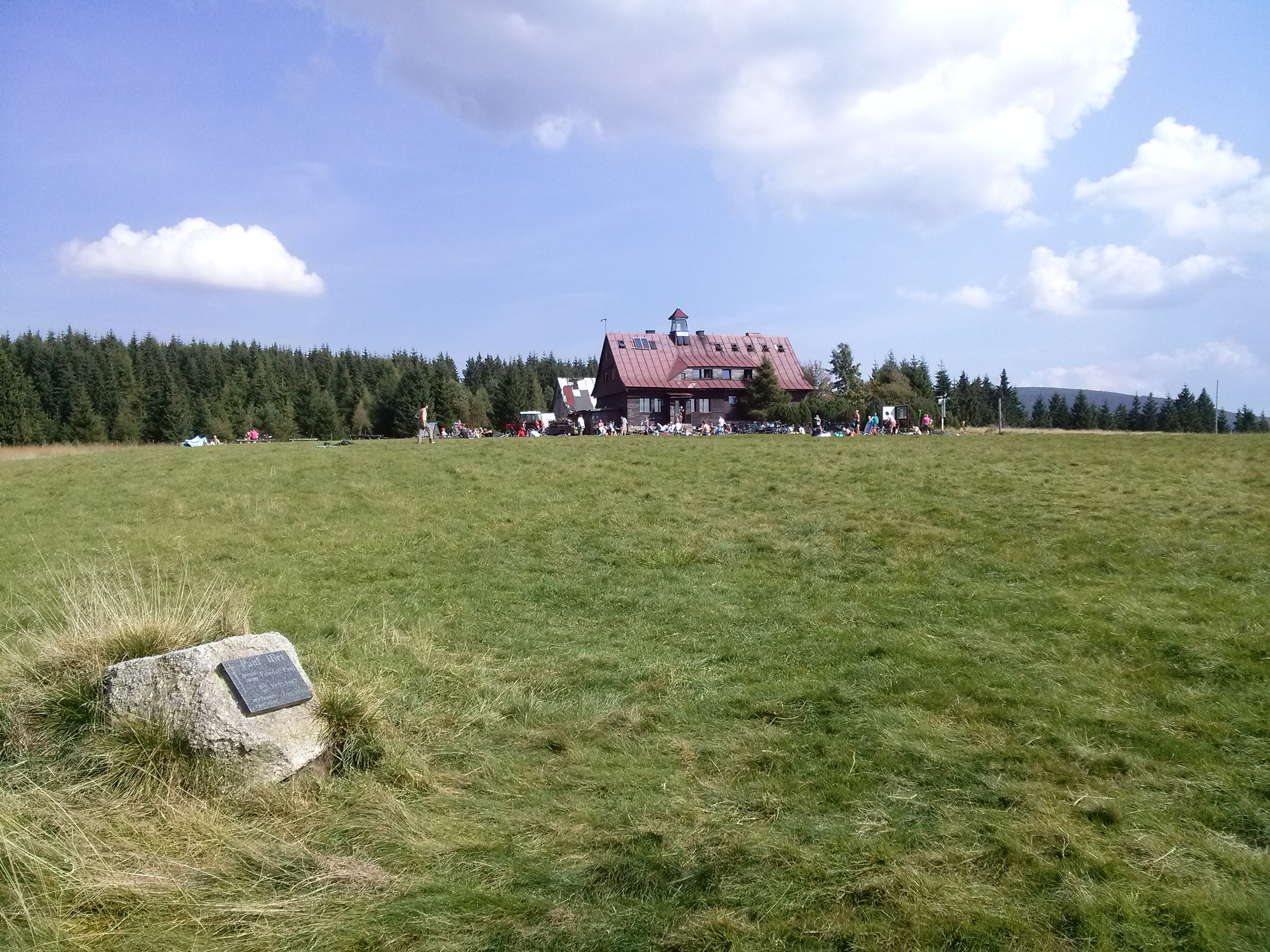
Paul Hirt's grave and the hostel Chatka Górzystów

The mountain hostel Chata Górzystów is the only object that survived from the village of Gross-Iser destroyed in the 1950s. Convenient paved bicycle and pedestrian paths, including those from Świeradów-Zdrój, as well as hiking and skiing trails lead to the hostel.

=== Hiking trails ===
The following trails run through the Meadow:

- red hiking trail to Jakuszyce
- yellow hiking trail from Stog Izerski to Rozdroże Izerskie
- blue trail from Polana Izerska to Szklarska Poręba.
