= Lubiechów =

- Village
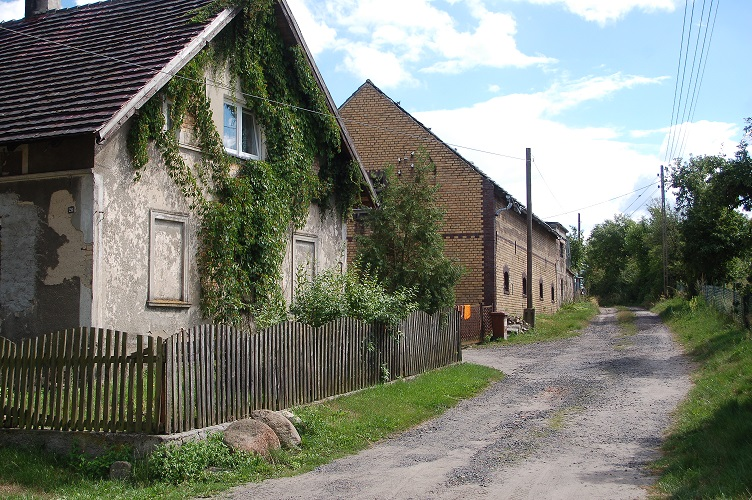

- Location within Poland
- Coordinates: 51°31′N 15°28′E
- Country: Poland
- Voivodeship: Lubusz
- County: Żagań
- Gmina: Małomice

Lubiechów [luˈbjɛxuf] is a village in the administrative district of Gmina Małomice, within Żagań County, Lubusz Voivodeship, in western Poland.
