= Małomice =

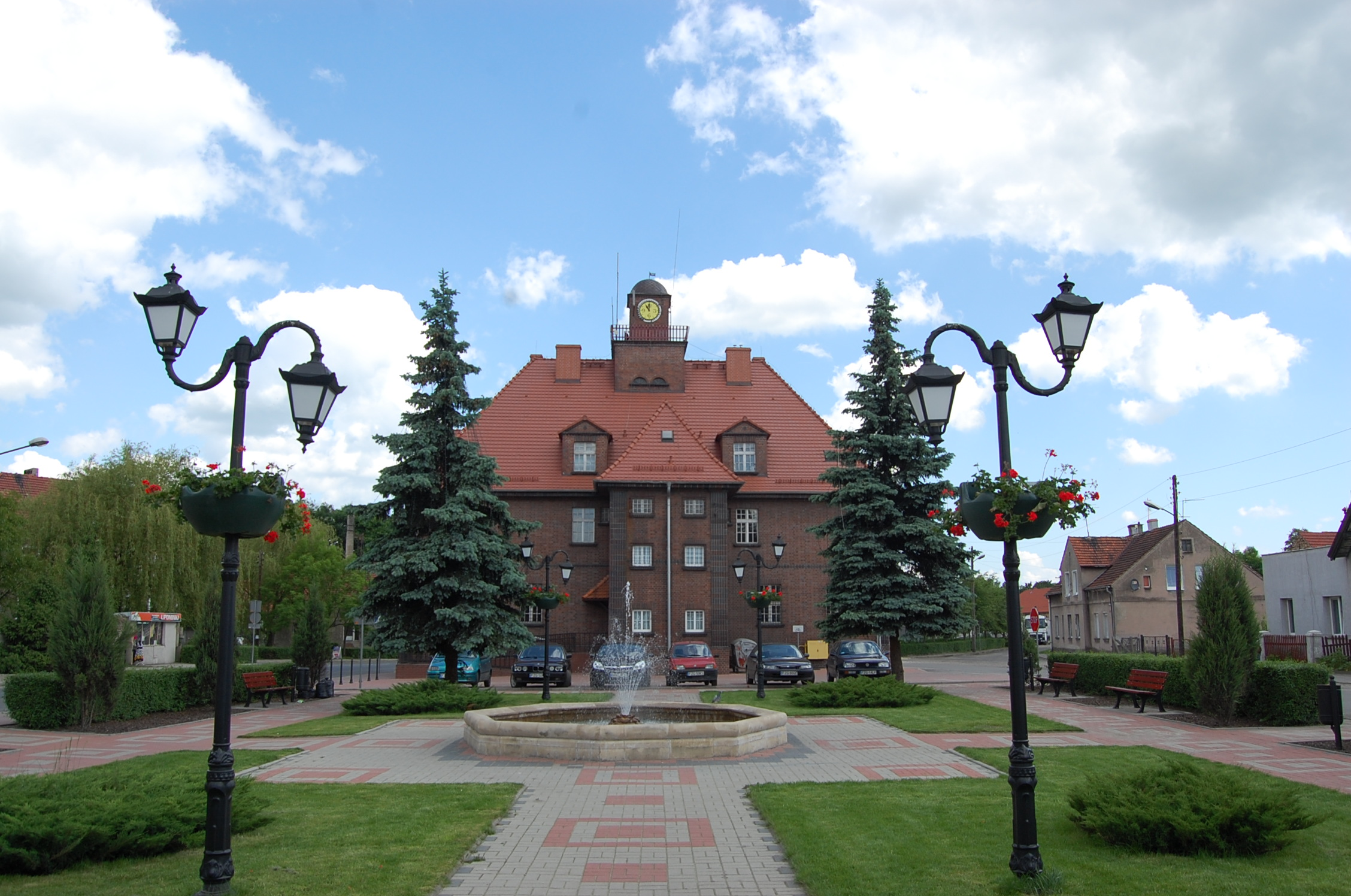
- Town Hall

- Coat of arms

- Location within Poland
- Coordinates: 51°33′26″N 15°26′58″E
- Country: Poland
- Voivodeship: Lubusz
- County: Żagań
- Gmina: Małomice
- Town rights: 1572 (limited), 1969 (full)

Area
  - Total: 5.25 km^{2} (2.03 sq mi)

Population (2019-06-30)
  - Total: 3,467
  - Density: 660/km^{2} (1,710/sq mi)
- Time zone: UTC+1 (CET)
  - Summer (DST): UTC+2 (CEST)
- Postal code: 67-320
- Area code: +48 68
- Car plates: FZG
- Website: http://www.malomice.pl

Małomice [mawɔˈmʲit͡sɛ] (German: Mallmitz) is a town in western Poland, located in Żagań County, Lubusz Voivodeship, with 3,467 inhabitants (2019). It is situated on the Bóbr river between Szprotawa and Żagań.

Located in the historical region of Lower Silesia, Małomice had been a centre of smelting bog iron by bloomery hearths since medieval times.

== History ==
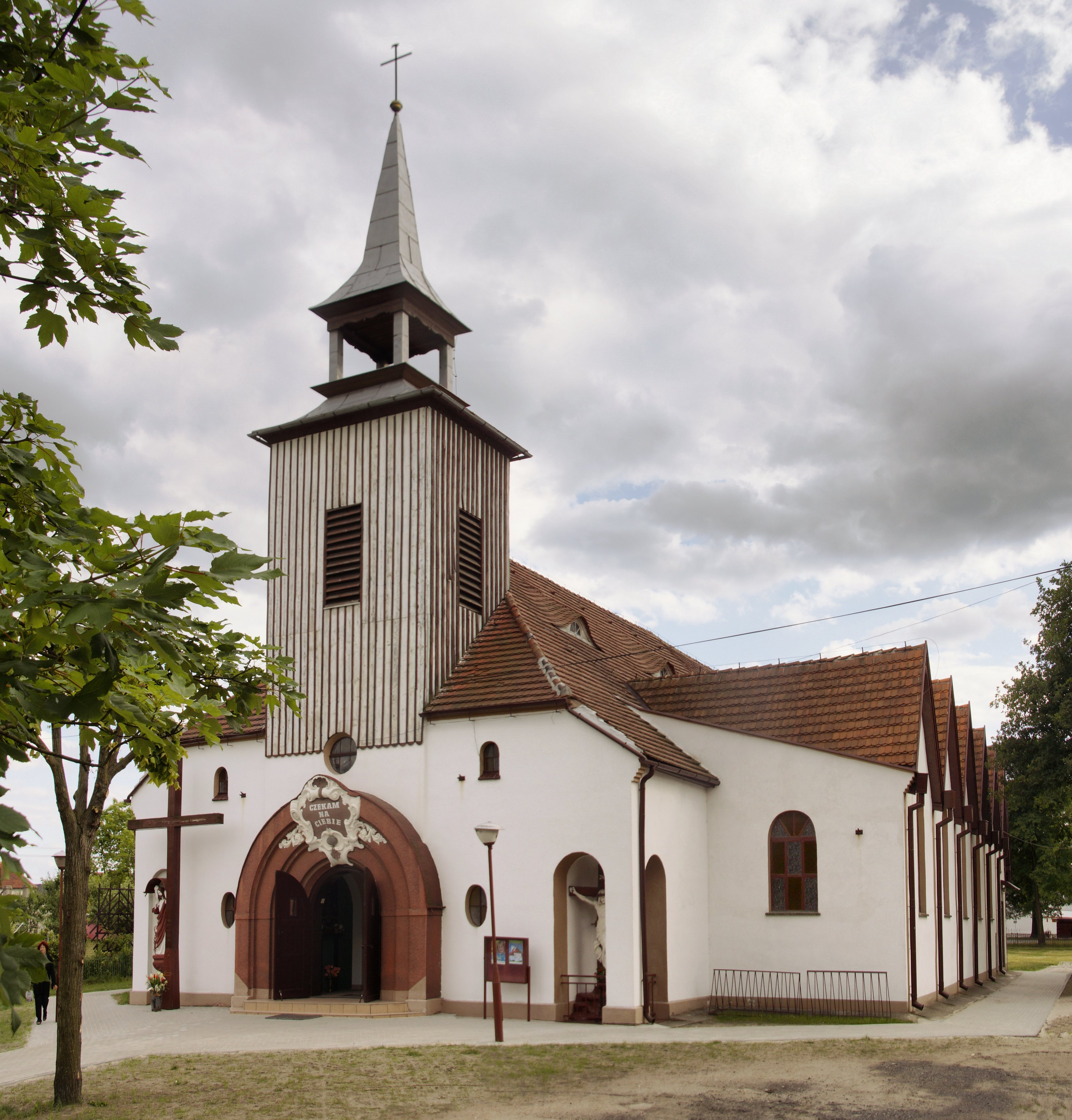
Church of the Nativity of the Virgin Mary in Małomice

Małomice originated as a Slavic settlement. After a deer antler tool was found on the Bober river in 1877, excavations in the 1930s showed probable age from between 1000 and 1200 on the basis of pottery finds.

The area formed part of the Medieval Kingdom of Poland and from the 13th century, as a result of the fragmentation of Poland, it was part of the Piast-ruled duchies of Głogów and Żagań. The first written mention of the village under the Old Polish name Małymicz dates from 1329. The village existed on agriculture and the production of bog iron. Around 1572, the lords of Schoenaich Mallmitz conferred limited town privileges. A chapel of the Virgin Mary was established in 1496, with the pastors coming from Eisenberg. This chapel, which also served as the crypt of the Kittlitz family, was rebuilt in Baroque style in 1737. In 1741 came the construction of a Protestant church. A year later the village came under Prussian control, and in 1816 became part of the district of Szprotawa/Sprottau.

More important than the village was the extensive ancient manorial estate, which had wide-ranging possessions in the duchies of Żagań and Głogów. A significant baron von Schoenaich is Fabian von Schoenaich, one of the largest landowners of Lower Silesia and Lusatia, who ruled between 1400 and 1680, later inherited by the Counts of Redern. In 1740, except for Mallmitz, the manors Primkenau and Kotzenau were in the possession of the Counts of Redern. In 1766 Mallmitz came into the possession of the burgraves of the von Dohna family, who ruled until 1945. Their seat was an old moated castle, which was rebuilt in 1690 as a Renaissance castle.

The lordship several iron trip hammers: Mallmitz, Rudawica, Świętoszów (Neuhammer on the Queis), Upper Eulau (Iława Śląska) and the "Old Hammer" between Mallmitz and Sprottau. In 1700 Mallmitz bog iron was delivered to a total of 17 hammer mills along the Tschirne and the Kwisa. In 1801 the Marienhütte, which originated from the Mallmitzer Hammer, was put into operation with a blast furnace and four secondary furnaces; the plant closed in 1933.

1875 Mallmitz received the railroad branch line from Arnsdorf at Legnica to Żagań, which resulted in rapid industrialization.

Małomice suffered severe damage in World War II, and later the ruins of the castle and the Protestant church were demolished. Małomice was raised in 1958 to a town-like settlement and received city rights in 1969.

== Notable people ==
- Nikolaus zu Dohna-Schlodien (1879–1956), Navy Officer

== Twin towns – sister cities ==
See twin towns of Gmina Małomice.
