= Vincenz Hasak =

Vincenz Hasak (b. Neustadt, near Friedland, Bohemia, 18 July 1812; d. 1 September 1889, as dean of Weisskirchlitz, near Teplice) was a Catholic historian. After completing his classical and theological studies in Litoměřice, he became chaplain in Arnsdorf, a post he held for eighteen years. Thenceforth to his death he was pastor in Weisskirchlitz. While chaplain, he began to collect old books, paintings, and copper-plate engravings, also gems and shells. He succeeded in collecting a small but highly esteemed museum. His library became particularly famous because of the copious collection of rare early printed books, e.g. the ten pre-Reformation German translations of the Bible.

He also made a scientific use of his treasures, and wrote several books about them, notable contributions in his day to the knowledge of medieval German religious life and the German language. Especially worthy of mention are:

- Der christliche Glaube des deutschen Volkes beim Schluss des Mittelalters (Christian Belief of Germans at the end of the Middle Ages) (Ratisbon, 1868), a very consisting of ninety-three printed books and manuscripts;
- Dr. M. Luther und die religiöse Literatur seiner Zeit bis zum Jahre 1520) (Ratisbon, 1881), a documentary description of the religious and moral conditions of the Middle Ages;
- Die Himmelstrasse (Ratisbon, 1882);
- Die letzte Rose, oder Eklärung des Vater Unser nach Markus von Weida (Ratisbon, 1883)
- Ein Vergissmeinnicht oder Von der heiligen Messe (Ratisbon, 1884);
- Herbstblumen, oder christlicher Volksunterricht in der vorreformatorischen Zeit (Ratisbon, 1885).
