= Śliwnik =

- Village
- Location within Poland
- Coordinates: 51°32′N 15°29′E
- Country: Poland
- Voivodeship: Lubusz
- County: Żagań
- Gmina: Małomice

Śliwnik [ˈɕlivnik] is a village in the administrative district of Gmina Małomice, within Żagań County, Lubusz Voivodeship, in western Poland.
