= Gmina Małomice =

Gmina Małomice Małomice Commune
- Gmina
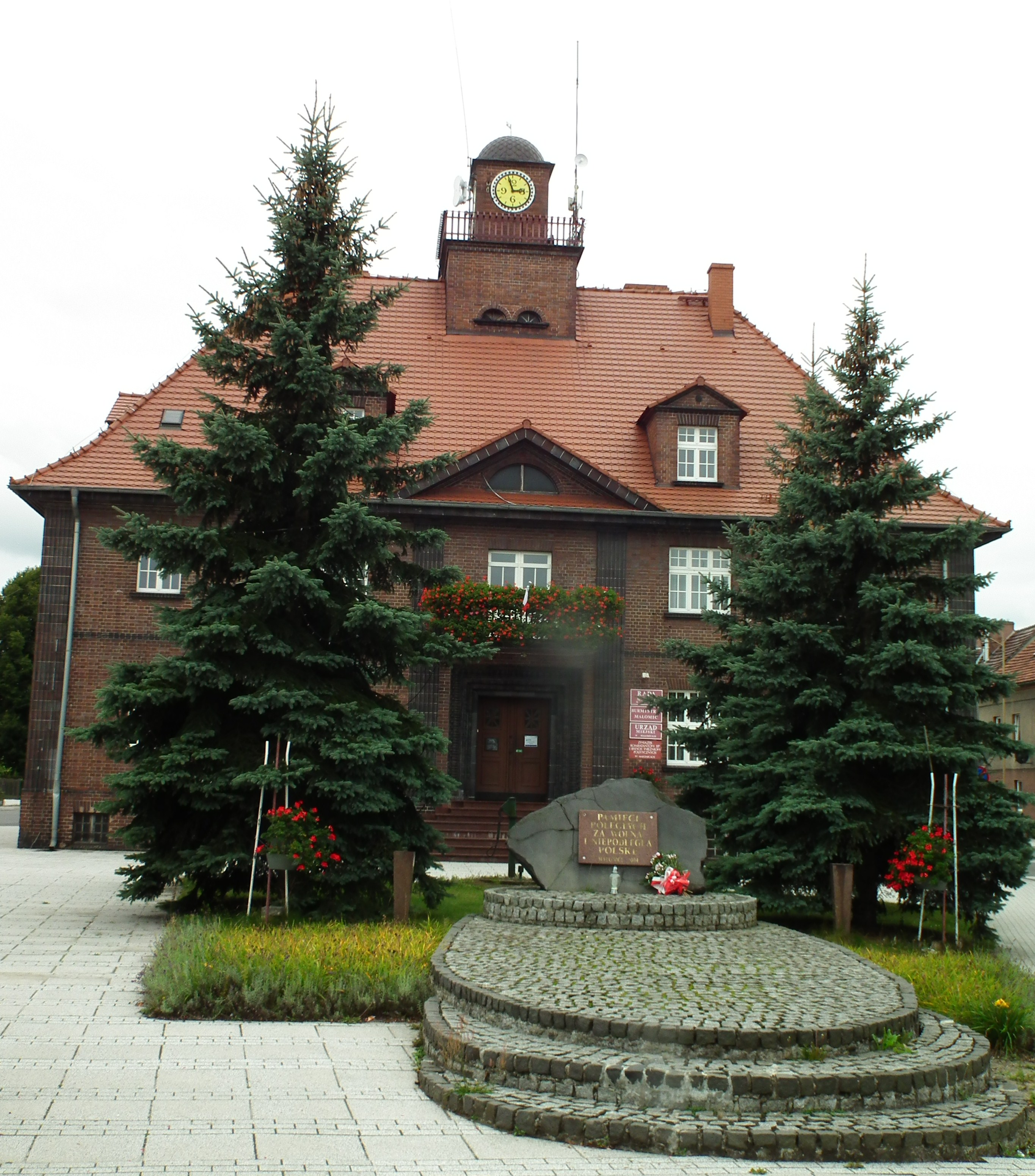
- Town Hall in Małomice, seat of the gmina office

- Coat of arms
- Interactive map of Gmina Małomice
- Coordinates (Małomice): 51°33′26″N 15°26′58″E
- Country: Poland
- Voivodeship: Lubusz
- County: Żagań
- Seat: Małomice

Area
  - Total: 79.5 km^{2} (30.7 sq mi)

Population (2019-06-30)
  - Total: 5,181
  - Density: 65.2/km^{2} (169/sq mi)
  - Urban: 3,467
  - Rural: 1,714
- Time zone: UTC+1 (CET)
  - Summer (DST): UTC+2 (CEST)
- Website: http://www.malomice.pl

Gmina Małomice is an urban-rural gmina (administrative district) in Żagań County, Lubusz Voivodeship, in western Poland. Its seat is the town of Małomice, which lies approximately 12 kilometres (7 mi) south-east of Żagań and 43 km (27 mi) south of Zielona Góra.

The gmina covers an area of 79.5 square kilometres (30.7 sq mi), and as of 2019 its total population is 5,181.

== Villages ==
Apart from the town of Małomice, Gmina Małomice contains the villages and settlements of Bobrzany, Chichy, Lubiechów, Śliwnik and Żelisław.

== Neighbouring gminas ==
Gmina Małomice is bordered by the gminas of Osiecznica, Szprotawa and Żagań.

== Twin towns – sister cities ==
Gmina Małomice is twinned with:

- Zeuthen, Germany
