= Chichy =

- Village
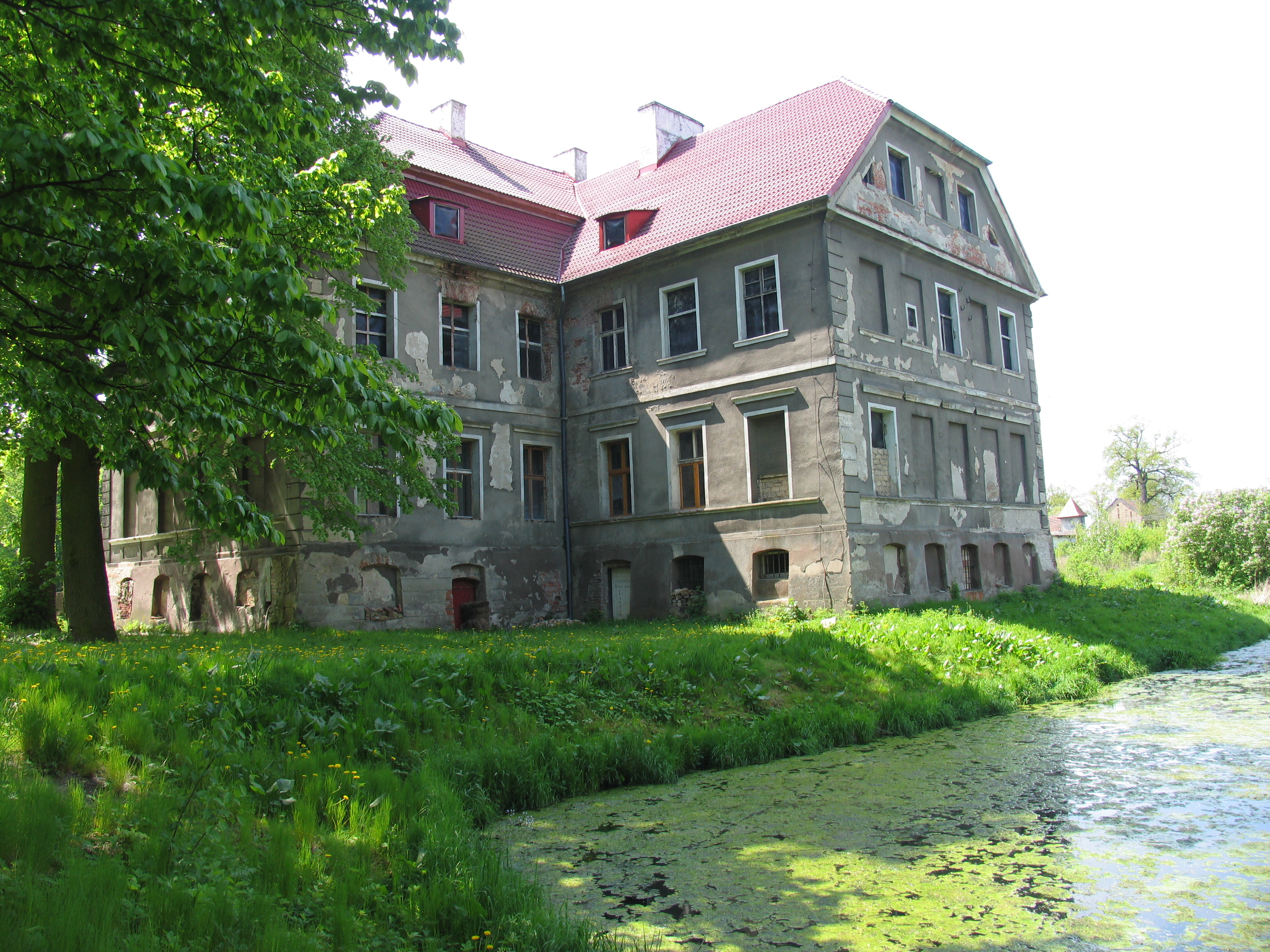
- Chichy palace

- Location within Poland
- Coordinates: 51°36′N 15°28′E
- Country: Poland
- Voivodeship: Lubusz
- County: Żagań
- Gmina: Małomice
- Population: 510

Chichy [ˈxixɨ] is a village in the administrative district of Gmina Małomice, within Żagań County, Lubusz Voivodeship, in western Poland.
