= Żelisław, Lubusz Voivodeship =

Żelisław
- Village
- Location within Poland
- Coordinates: 51°33′33″N 15°24′19″E
- Country: Poland
- Voivodeship: Lubusz
- County: Żagań
- Gmina: Małomice

Żelisław [ʐɛˈliswaf] is a village in the administrative district of Gmina Małomice, within Żagań County, Lubusz Voivodeship, in western Poland.
