= Smrk (Jizera Mountains) =

Mountain in the Czech Republic

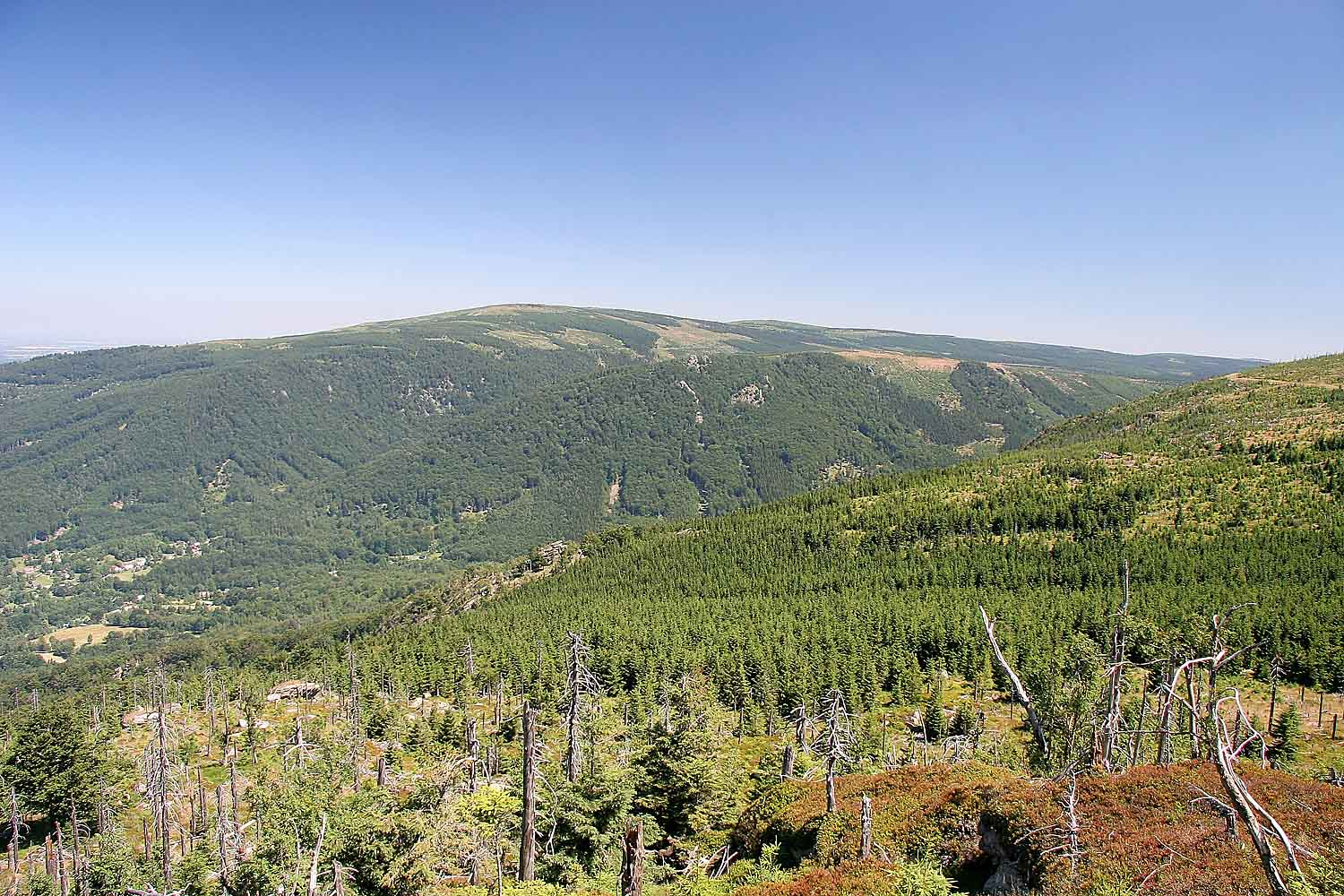

Highest point
- Elevation: 1,124 m (3,688 ft)
- Prominence: 184 m (604 ft)
- Isolation: 11 km (6.8 mi)
- Coordinates: 50°53′22″N 15°16′19″E

Geography
- Location within Czech Republic
- Location: Czech Republic, Poland
- Parent range: Jizera Mountains

Smrk (Polish: Smrek; German: Tafelfichte) is the highest mountain of the Jizera Mountains. It rises up to 1,124 m (3,688 ft).

== Geography ==
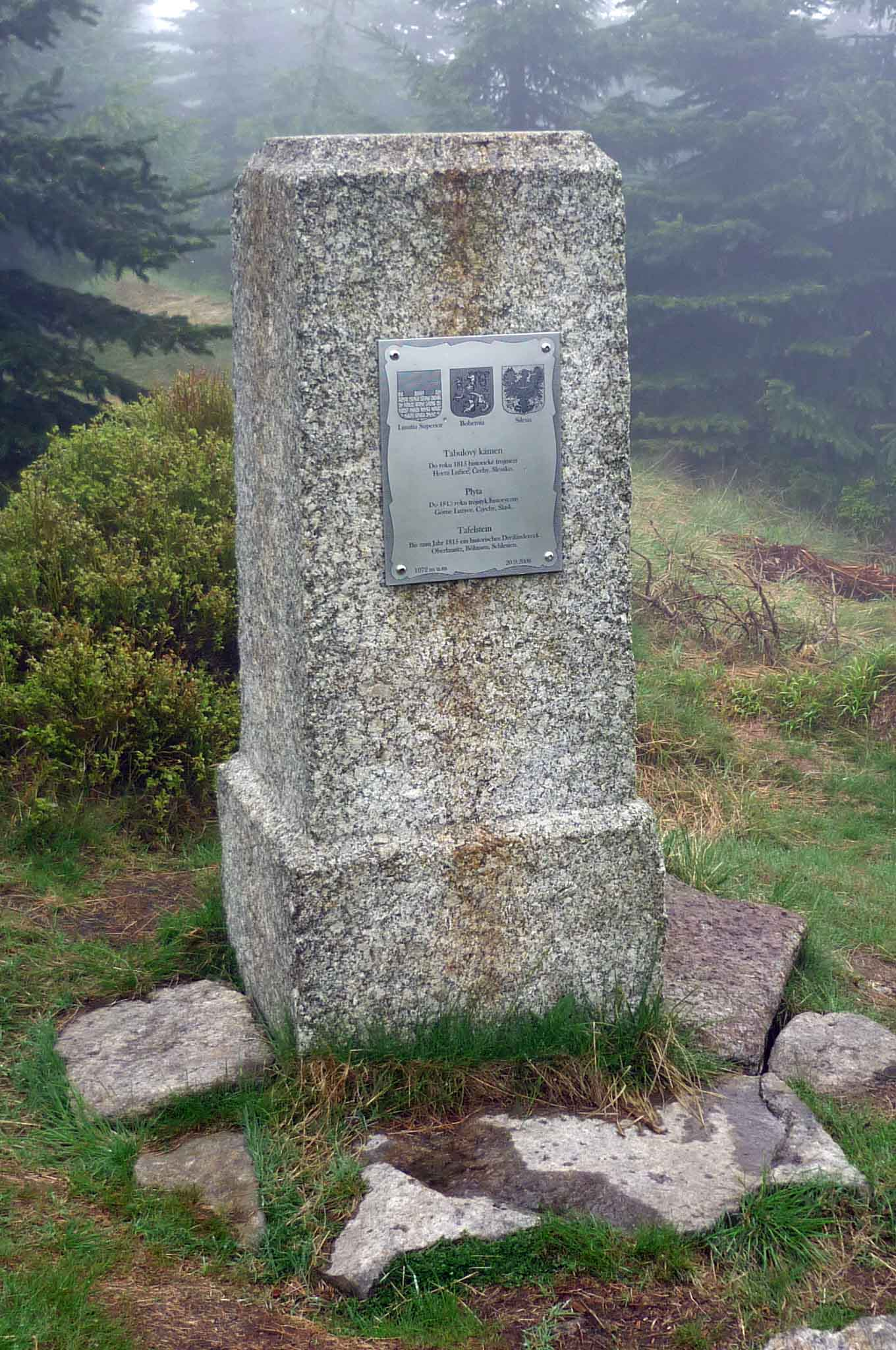
Tabulový kámen

The top of the mountain lies in the municipal territory of Lázně Libverda in the Liberec Region of northern Bohemia. On the eastern rim of the plateau is the boundary with Poland; the Polish summit west of Świeradów-Zdrój reaches a height of 1,123 m (3,684 ft).

The summit offers a panoramic view to the prominent Sněžka peak of the Giant Mountains in the east, as well as to the Lusatian Highlands beyond the German border in the west up to the cooling towers of Boxberg Power Station.

== History ==
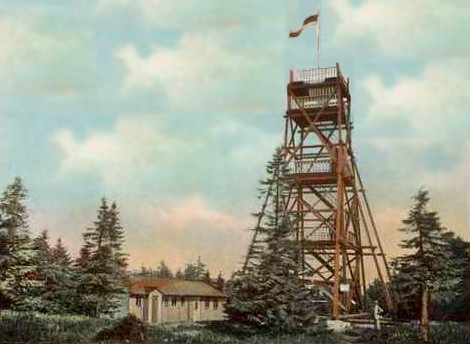
Observation tower, about 1900

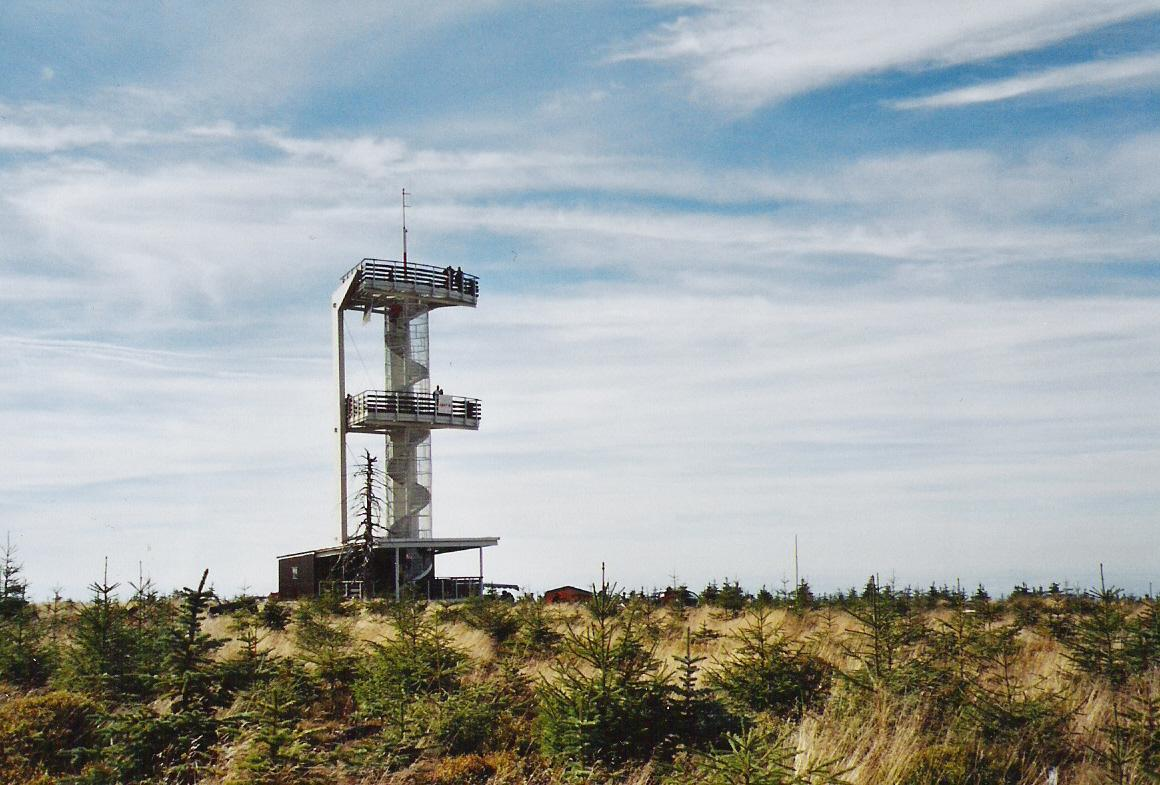
New tower

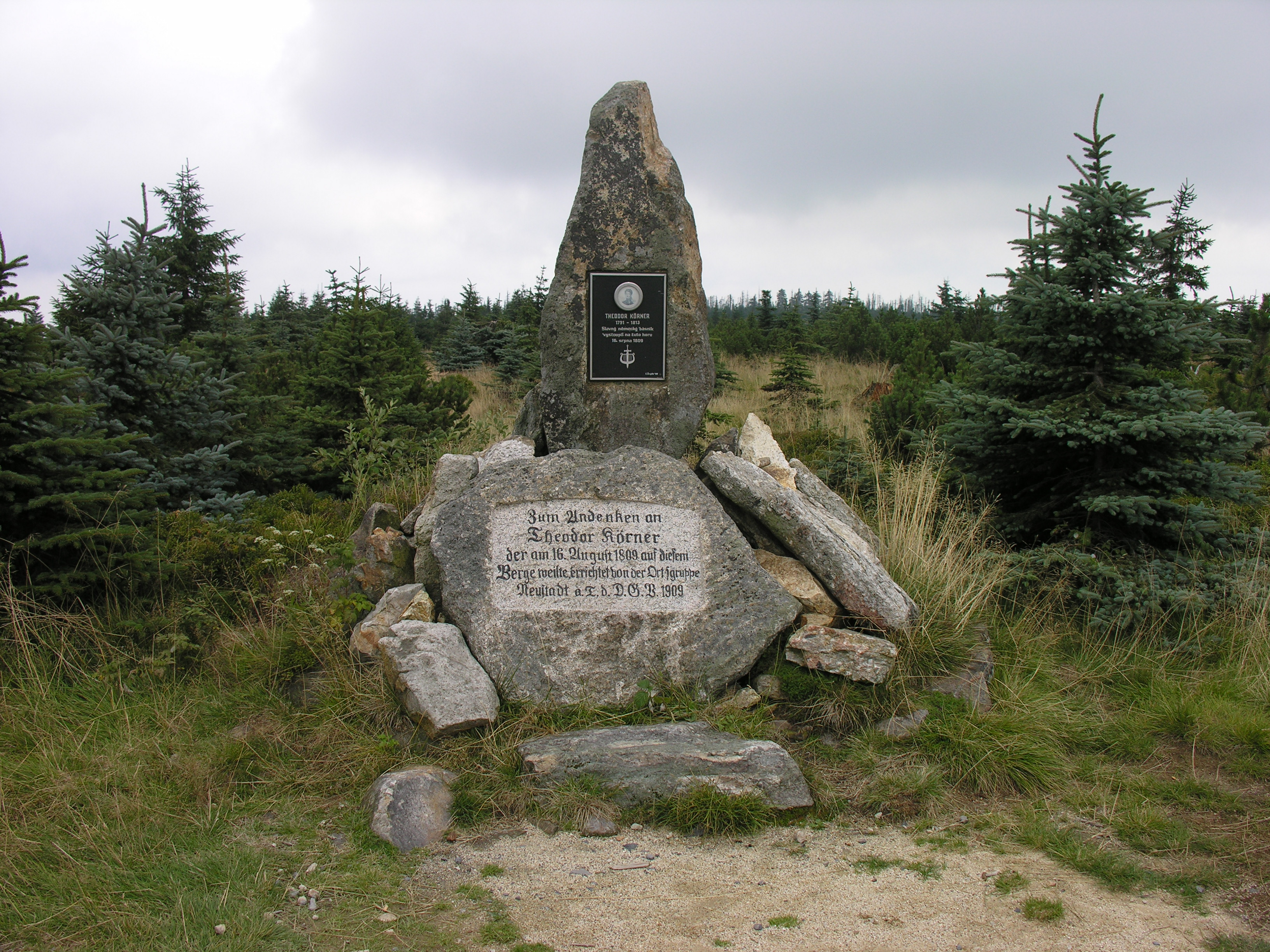
Theodor Körner memorial

The "Tabulový kámen" (Tafelstein) stone monument on the northern slope marks the site, which since the Middle Ages formed the historic tripoint between

- the Upper Lusatian lordship of Meffersdorf (Polish: Unięcice, in present-day Pobiedna)
- the Lower Silesian duchy of Jawor, where the lands around Szklarska Poręba (Schreiberhau) were held by the House of Schaffgotsch, and
- the Bohemian territory around Frýdlant (Friedland).

The mountain got its name from a once mighty spruce (Czech: smrk, German: Fichte) tree near the border, where the Imperial generalissimo Albrecht von Wallenstein, after his elevation to a Duke of Friedland, nailed his coat of arms in 1628. The tree was uprooted, in 1790, by a storm.

Bohemia, Silesia and Lusatia had all been Lands of the Bohemian Crown since the 14th century, and part of the Austrian Habsburg monarchy from 1526. After Upper Lusatia passed to the Electorate of Saxony during the Thirty Years' War by the 1635 Peace of Prague, and the Prussian king Frederick the Great conquered Silesia in 1742, the mountain was also the tripoint between the Saxon, Prussian and Austrian lands. According to the 1815 Congress of Vienna, Prussia also annexed the Upper Lusatian lands in the northwest, which were incorporated into the Province of Silesia.

On 21 August 1892, a wooden observation tower, which was 20 m (66 ft) high, was built atop Tafelfichte. The mountain hut used to house the construction workers was converted, after the tower's construction, to a cottage (Baude, bouda). Until 1935, up to 18,000 people per year visited the mountain summit.

In 1909, a memorial stone honoring the German poet Theodor Körner was erected at the summit to commemorate his stay a hundred years before.

After World War II the local German population was expelled and the cottage was deserted and looted. The abandoned premises fell into disrepair and the tower collapsed in the 1950s. Over the following decades forest dieback, from parasites or acid rain, has cleared the peak of the mountain to the point where it is largely bare.

After the 1989 Velvet Revolution, plans were made to build a new tower. In 2002, construction began and on September 18, 2003 a second 20-metre-high (66 ft) tower, this time made with steel, was inaugurated. In June 2009, a replica of the 19th-century wooden tower was erected at the Prague Zoo.

== Ascents ==
- A good starting point is the Czech town of Lázně Libverda from where a red-marked trail leads to the Smrk summit.
- A likewise steep route from the Polish side starts at Świeradów-Zdrój via the Stóg Izerski (Heufuder) subpeak to the summit.
- Another convenient route is from the Czech Smědava (Wittighaus) inn for 7 km (4.3 mi) along red markers. Only the last section, called "Jacob's Ladder" (Himmelsleiter) is steeply uphill.
