= Świeradów-Zdrój =

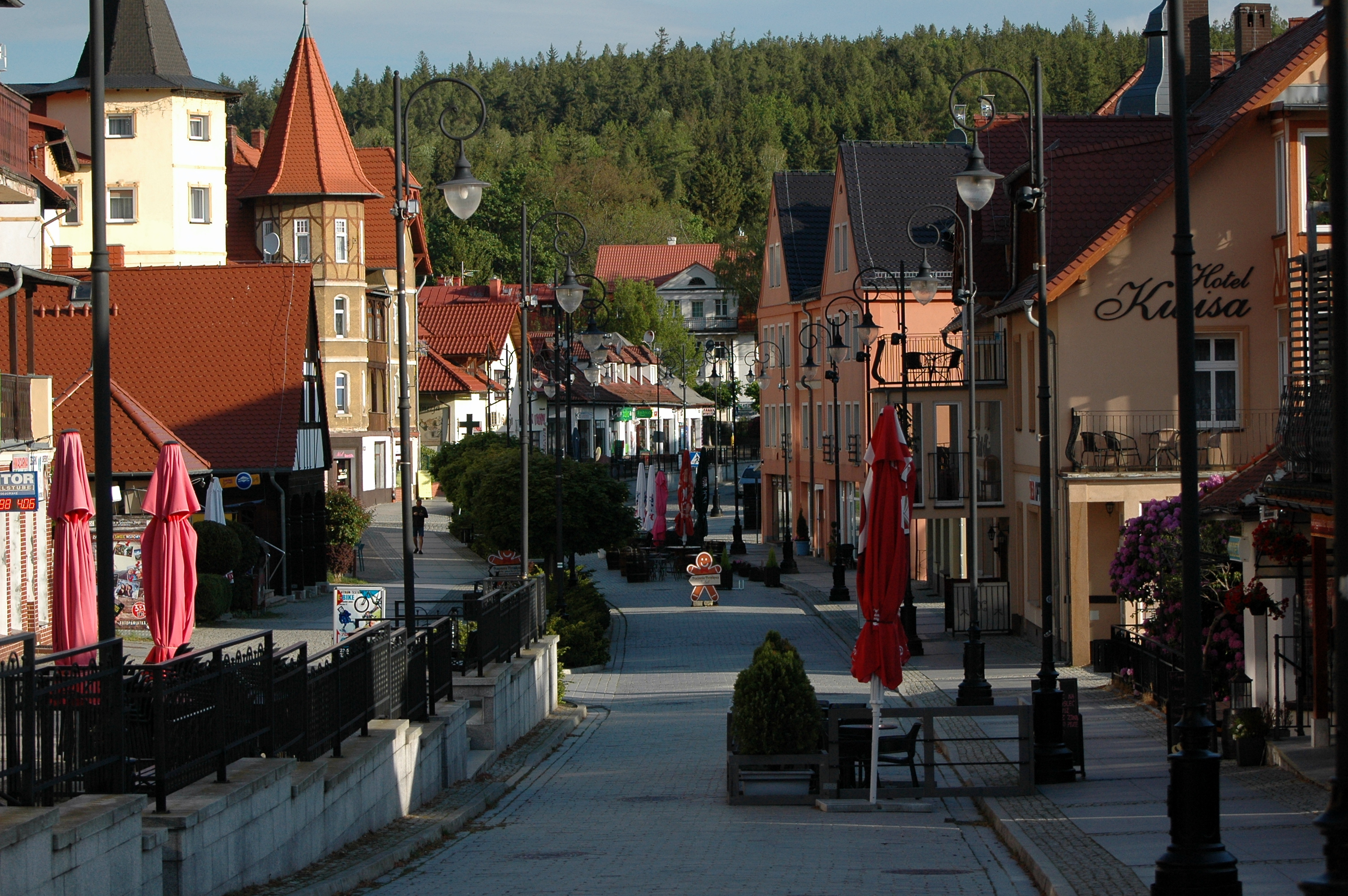
- Town center

- Coat of arms

- Location within Poland
- Coordinates: 50°54′N 15°20′E
- Country: Poland
- Voivodeship: Lower Silesian
- County: Lubań
- Gmina: Świeradów-Zdrój (urban gmina)
- Founded: 14th century
- Town rights: 1946

Area
  - Total: 20.72 km^{2} (8.00 sq mi)
- Highest elevation: 710 m (2,330 ft)
- Lowest elevation: 450 m (1,480 ft)

Population (2019-06-30)
  - Total: 4,147
  - Density: 200.1/km^{2} (518.4/sq mi)
- Time zone: UTC+1 (CET)
  - Summer (DST): UTC+2 (CEST)
- Vehicle registration: DLB
- Website: http://www.swieradowzdroj.pl

Świeradów-Zdrój (Polish: [ɕfjɛˈraduv ˈzdruj]; German: Bad Flinsberg) is a spa town in Lubań County, Lower Silesian Voivodeship, in south-western Poland near the border with the Czech Republic. The town is located in the Kwisa valley of the Jizera Mountains, a part of the Sudetes range. As at 2019, it has a population of 4,147.

== History ==
The settlement was first documented in 1524 under the name *Fegebeutel*, referring to a local forest tavern. Located in the upper Kwisa valley within the Jizera Mountains, on the eastern slope of the Smrk massif, at the tripoint of historic Silesia with the Bohemian and Upper Lusatian regions, the area was administered by the noble von Schaffgotsch family and belonged to the Kingdom of Bohemia. The village developed during the 16th century as a loose community of shepherds and lumbermen, with the name *Flinsberg* first recorded in 1559.

The exceptional properties of the Flinsberg mineral springs were suspected as early as the 16th century. In 1572, the Swiss doctor Leonard Thurneysser, private physician of Elector John George of Brandenburg wrote for the first time about the discovery of the extraordinary features of the local healing waters. They were described by the Protestant reformer Caspar Schwenckfeld about 1600, and Fryderyk Luca also wrote about them in 1683 in his Silesian chronicle. The area was heavily devastated during the Thirty Years' War, at first by Imperial troops under General Ottavio Piccolomini, then by Swedish forces in the course of the seize of nearby Gryf Castle (Greiffenstein) in Proszówka (Gräflich Neundorf).

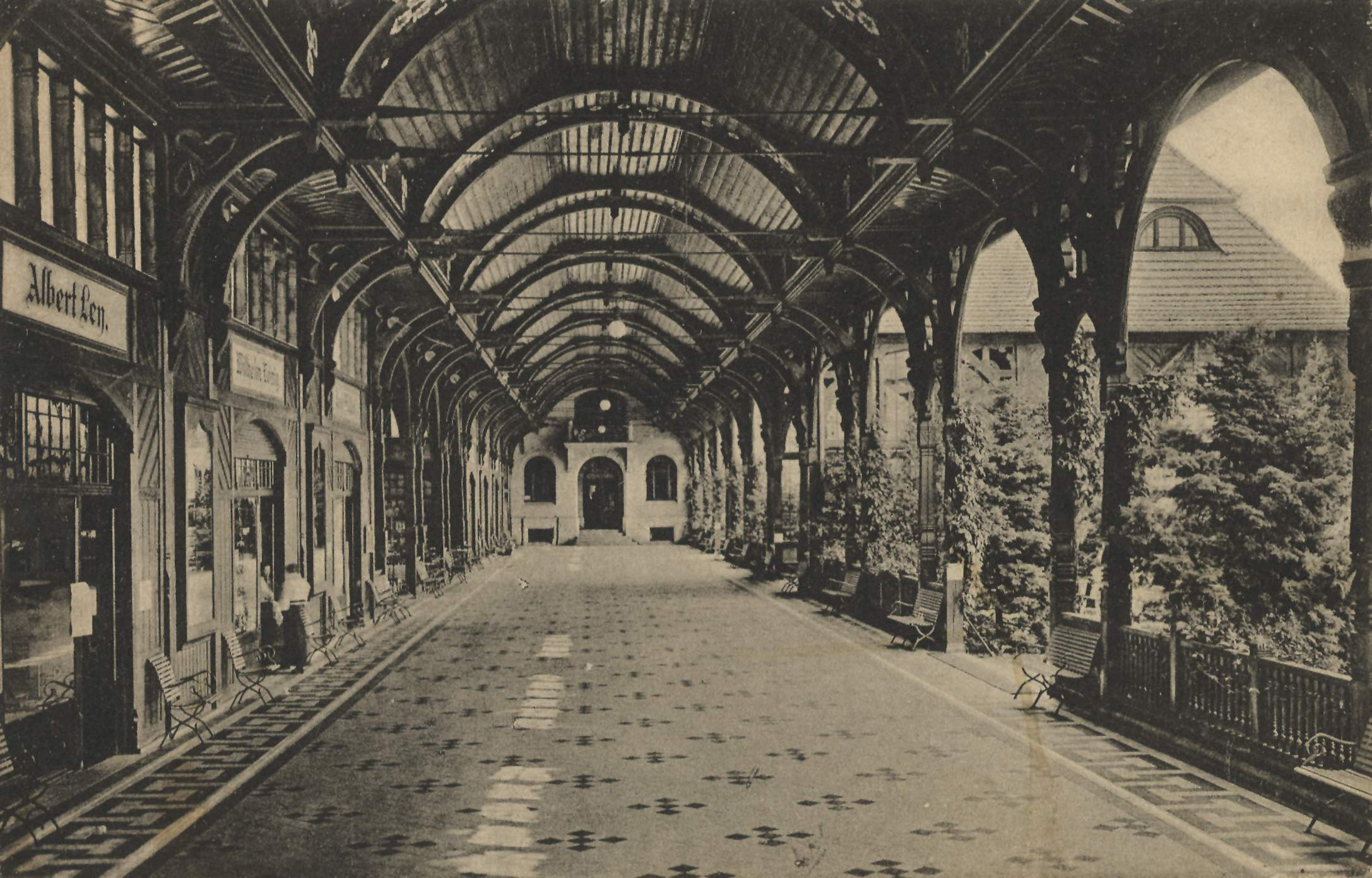
Spa house in the early 20th century

A century later the land owners of the Schaffgotsch noble family established a special commission to gather scientific evidence and describe the healing effects of the Świeradów waters. The commission settled that the water “…agitates appetite, inhibits vomiting, eases anxiety states, stomach and liver illnesses”. The health resort started to develop in 1768 when the owners of land built the first spa house. The peak of health resort development occurred in the 1920s. Direct railway connection to Mirsk (then Friedeberg) operating since 1909 opened Świeradów to the world and contributed to full prosperity of the spa town.

Annexed by Kingdom of Prussia in the 18th century, from 1816 to 1945 the settlement belonged to the Löwenberg in Schlesien district.

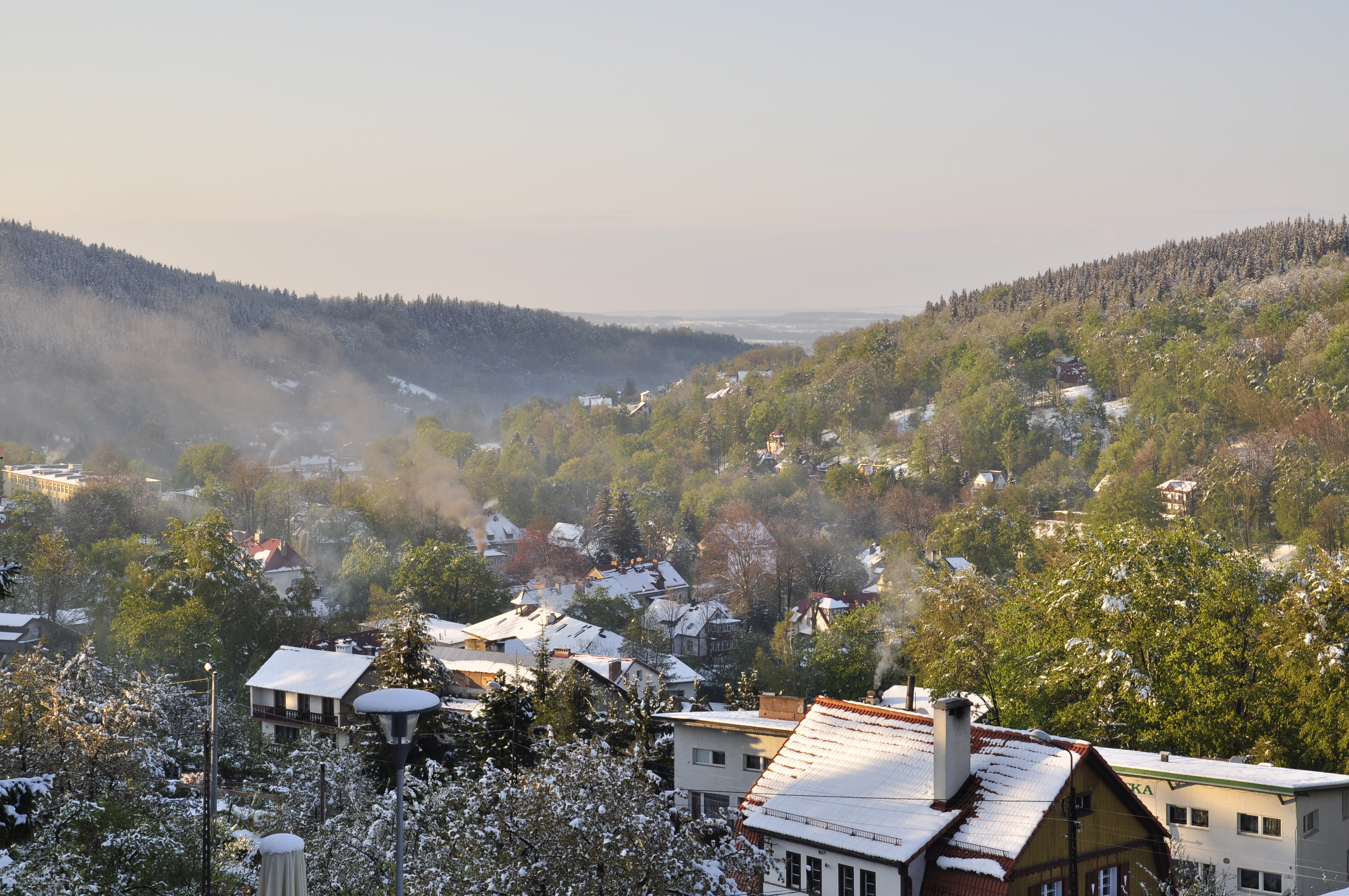
Świeradów-Zdrój in 2011

In 1945 Bad Flinsberg was occupied by the Red Army and its German population expelled. As part of the Republic of Poland, the health resort resumed its activity on 26 May 1946. Świeradów was also granted town rights in 1946. The town was repopulated by Poles, most of whom were expelled from former eastern Poland annexed by the Soviet Union. Its town limits were expanded in 1973, by incorporating the neighbouring village of Czerniawa-Zdrój as a new district.

=== Name ===
The town's historical German name, Flinsberg, is derived from the Middle High German word vlins (meaning flint or hard rock), reflecting the geologically rocky terrain of the Jizera Mountains. Early modern chroniclers popularized a myth connecting the name to a pagan Lusatian deity named Flins, an assertion that has been disproven by modern onomastic and historical research.

Following World War II, when the region became part of Poland, the town lacked an established historical Polish name and was provisionally called Wieniec-Zdrój (literally "Wreath Spa") by local administrative authorities between 1945 and 1946, referencing the wreath of mountain peaks surrounding the valley. In 1946, the official Commission for the Determination of Place Names permanently renamed the resort Świeradów-Zdrój. The name was chosen to honor the medieval Slavic saint Andrew Świerad (Saint Zoerardus), while Zdrój denotes its status as a health resort.

== Balneotherapy and recreation ==
The spa house built in 1899 offers mineral water, radon and mud bath treatments of rheumatism and other adult diseases.

In 2008, a gondola was opened as the fourth such ski lift in Poland improving the position of Świeradów as a winter ski resort.

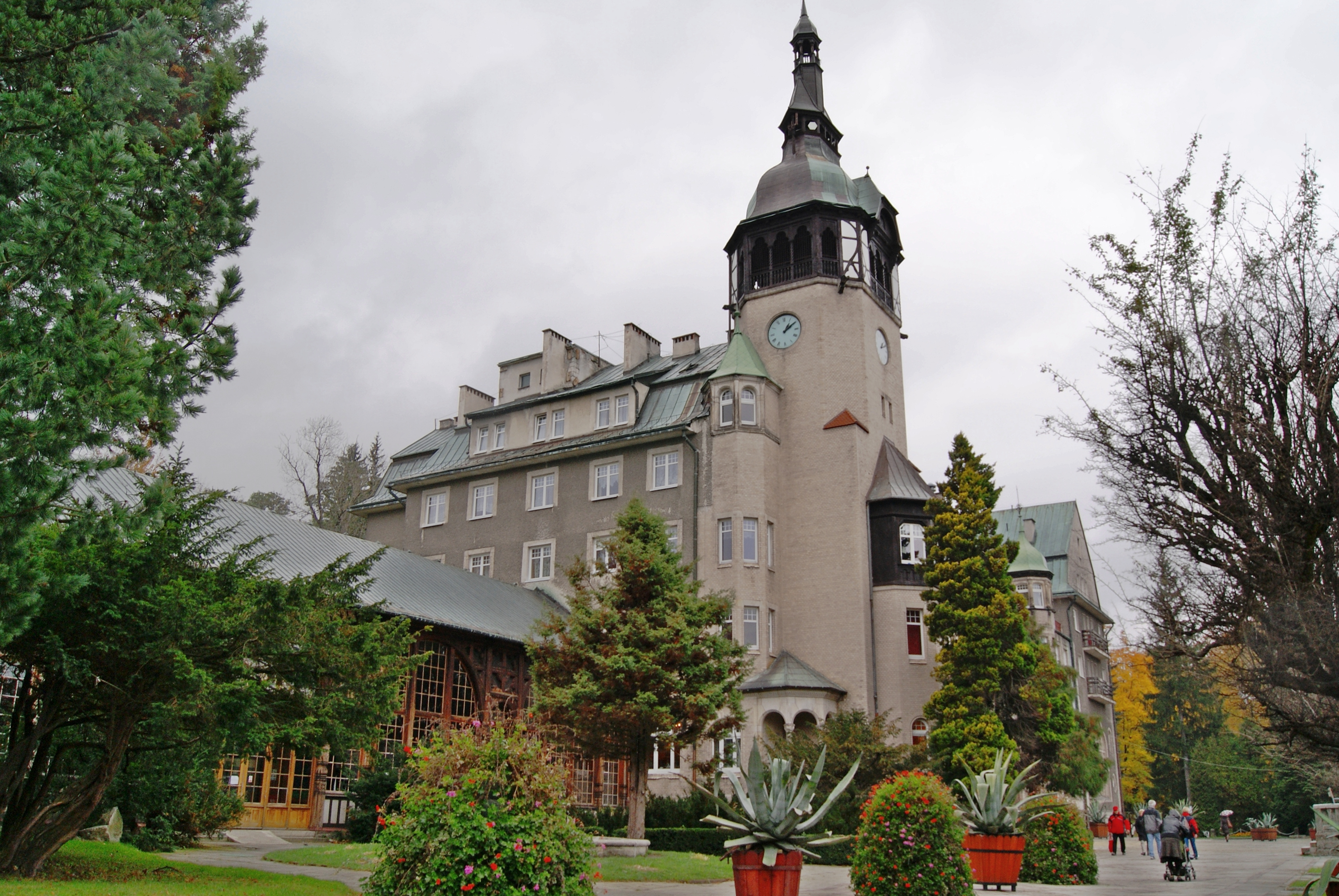
Spa house

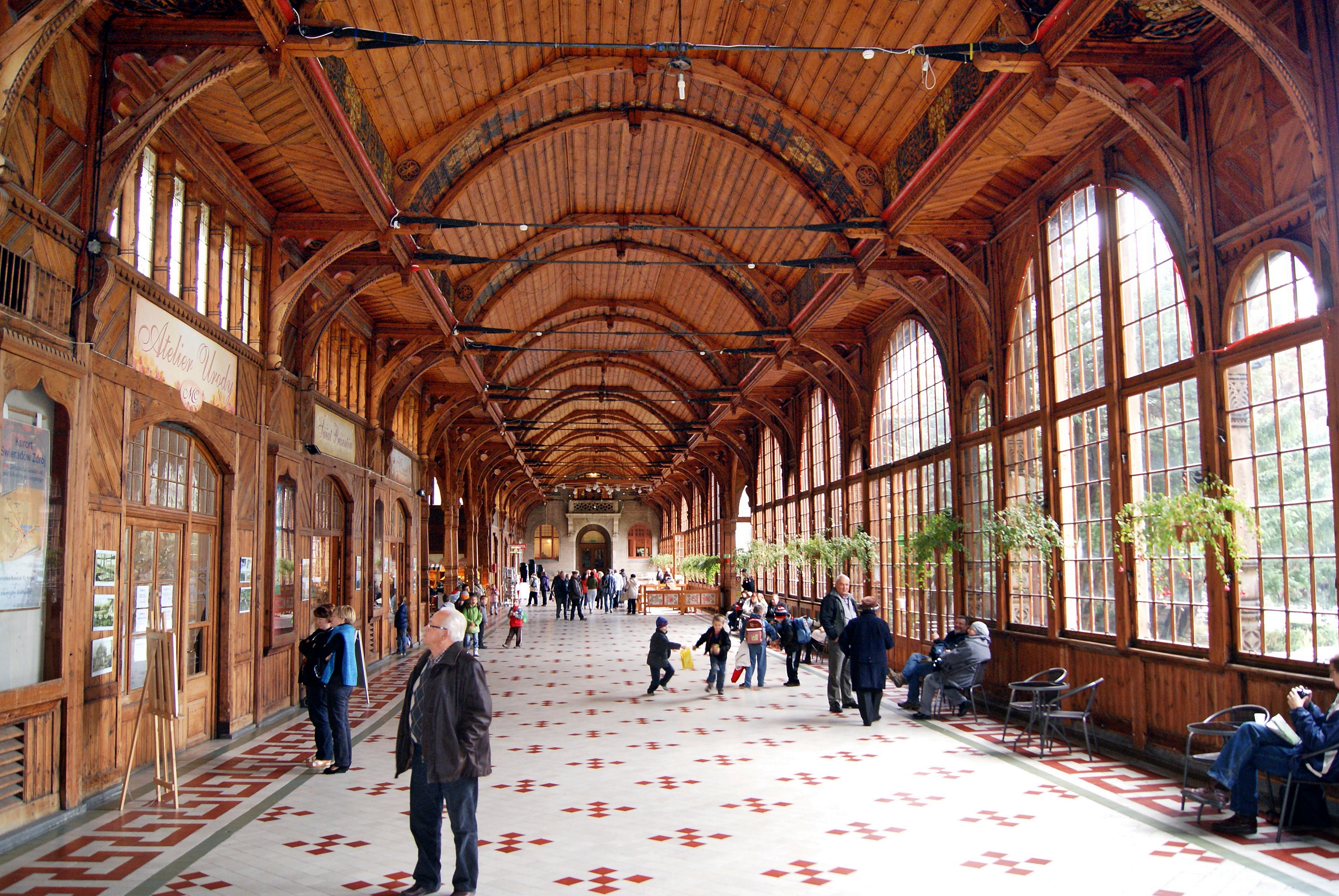
Spa house hallway

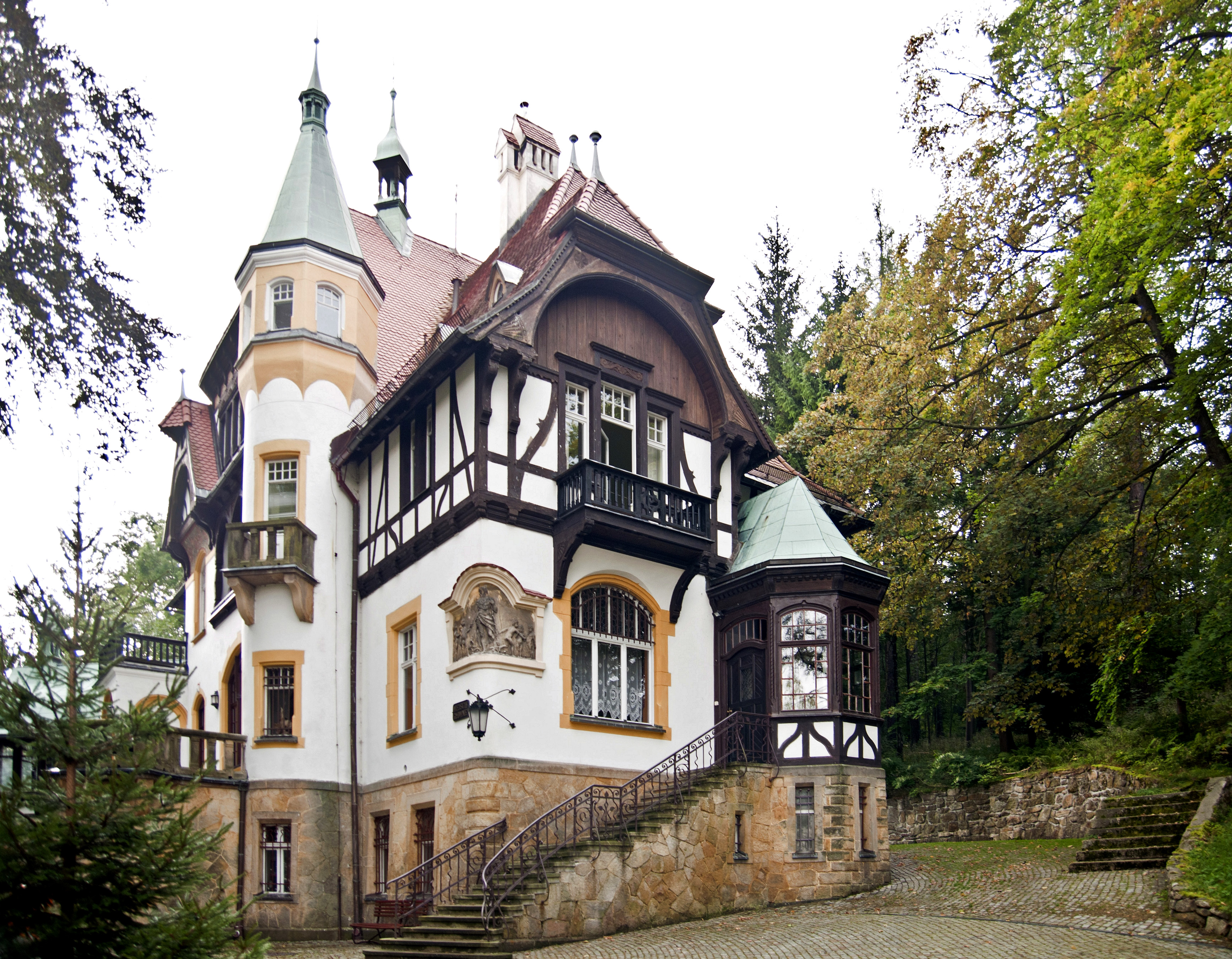
Marzenie pension

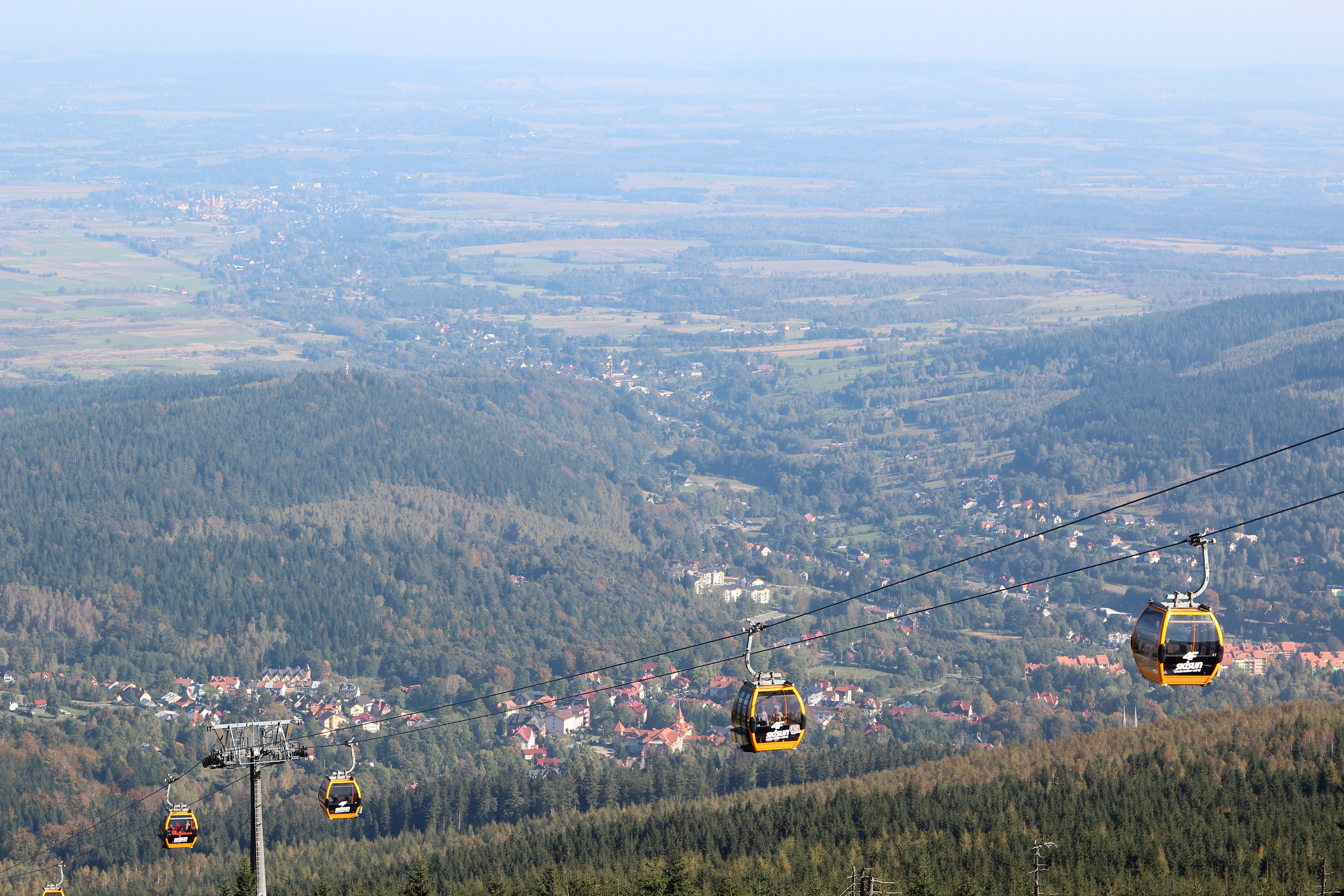
Stóg Izerski gondola lift

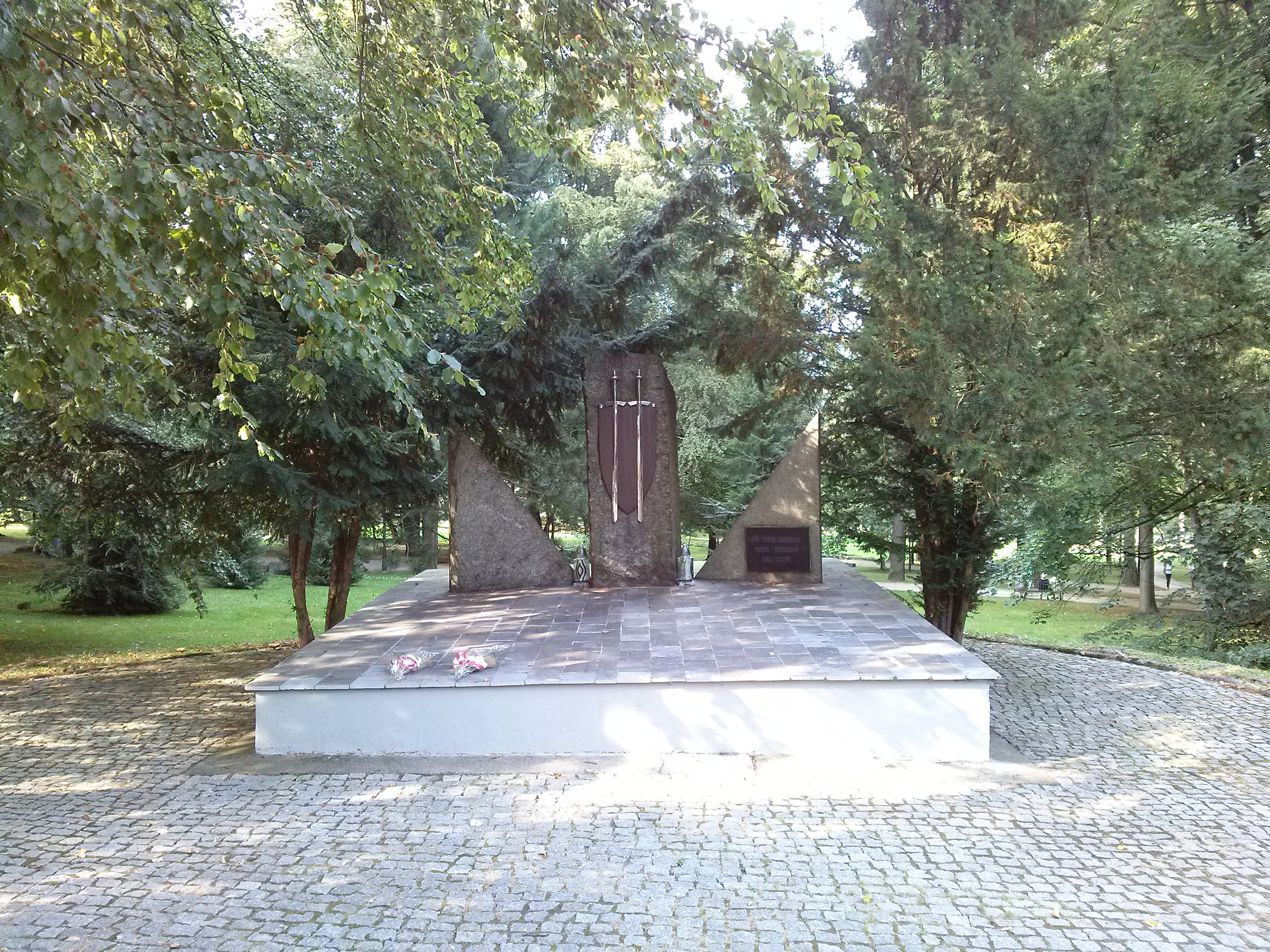
Monument commemorating the freedom and independence of Poland

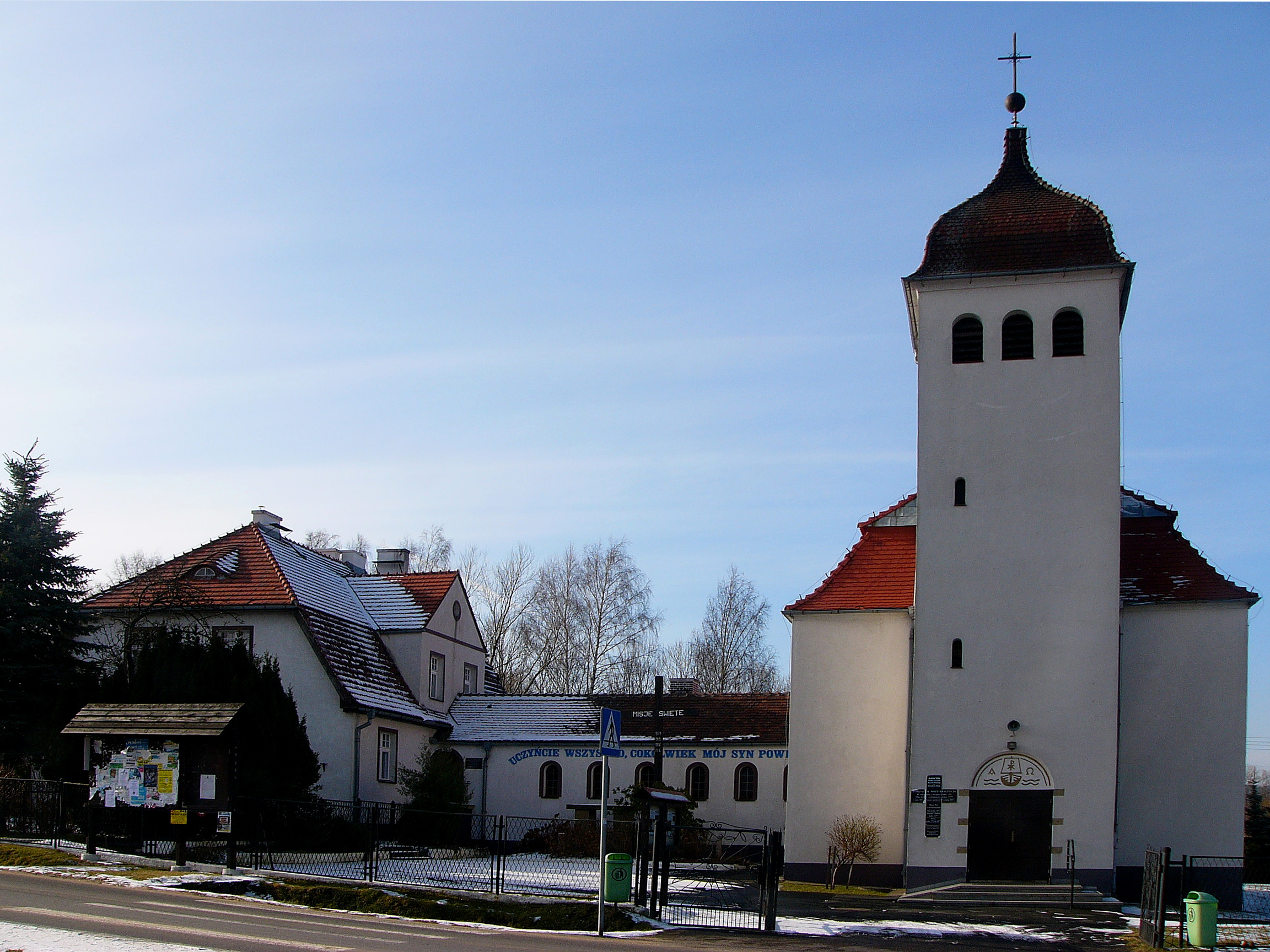
Exaltation of the Holy Cross church

== Twin towns – sister cities ==
Świeradów-Zdrój is twinned with:

- Bílý Potok, Czech Republic
- Jilemnice, Czech Republic
- Jindřichovice pod Smrkem, Czech Republic
- Lázně Libverda, Czech Republic
- Nové Město pod Smrkem, Czech Republic
- Odder, Denmark
- Seifhennersdorf, Germany
