= Lubań–Leśna railway =

Railway line in south-western Poland

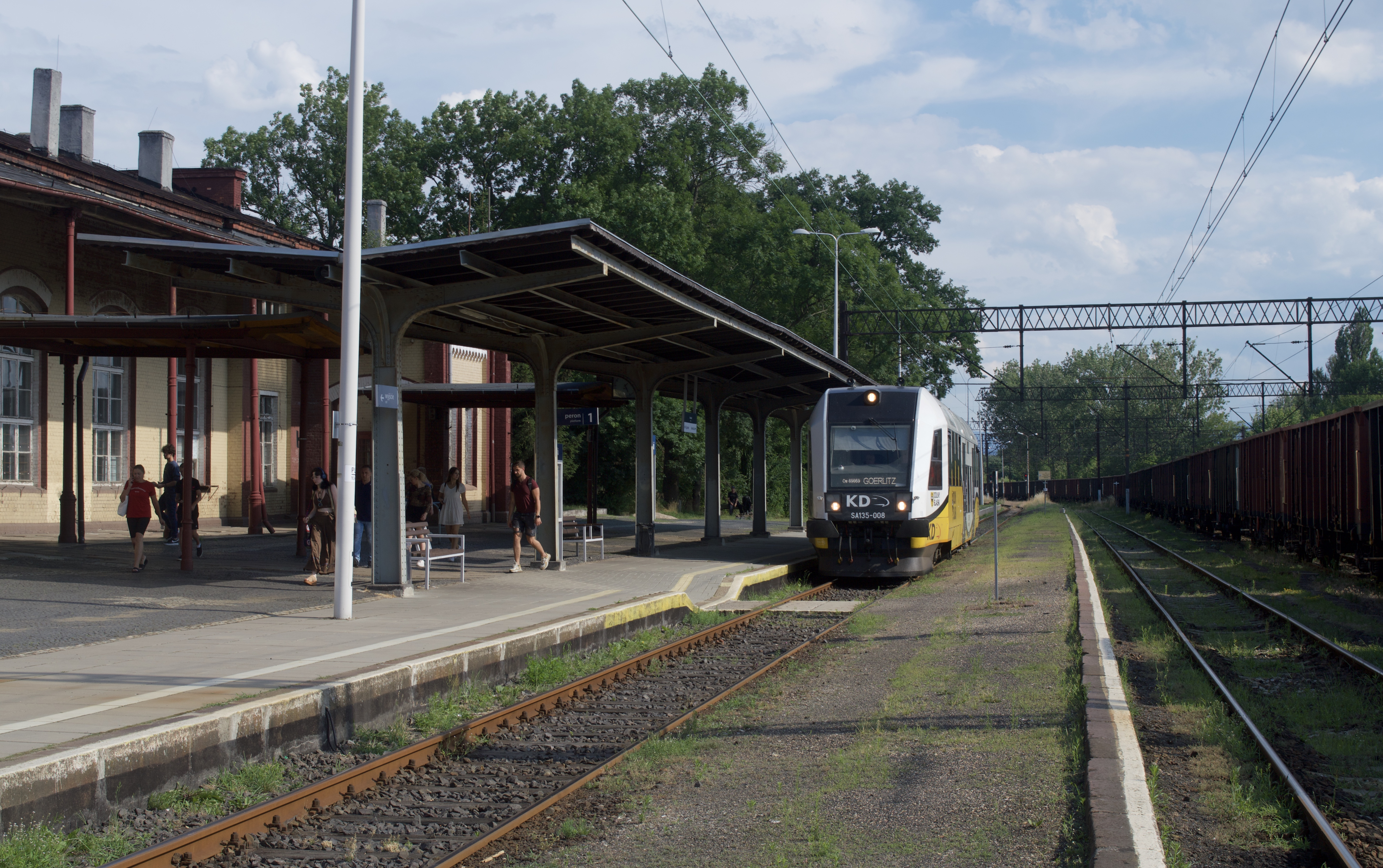
- Lubań Śląski railway station

Overview
- Owner: PKP Polskie Linie Kolejowe
- Line number: 337
- Termini: Lubań Śląski; Leśna

History
- Opened: 1896
- Closed: 1994
- Reopened: 2008

Technical
- Line length: 11.155 km (6.931 mi)
- Track gauge: 1,435 mm (4 ft 8 1/2 in)
- Operating speed: 40 km/h (25 mph)
Route map
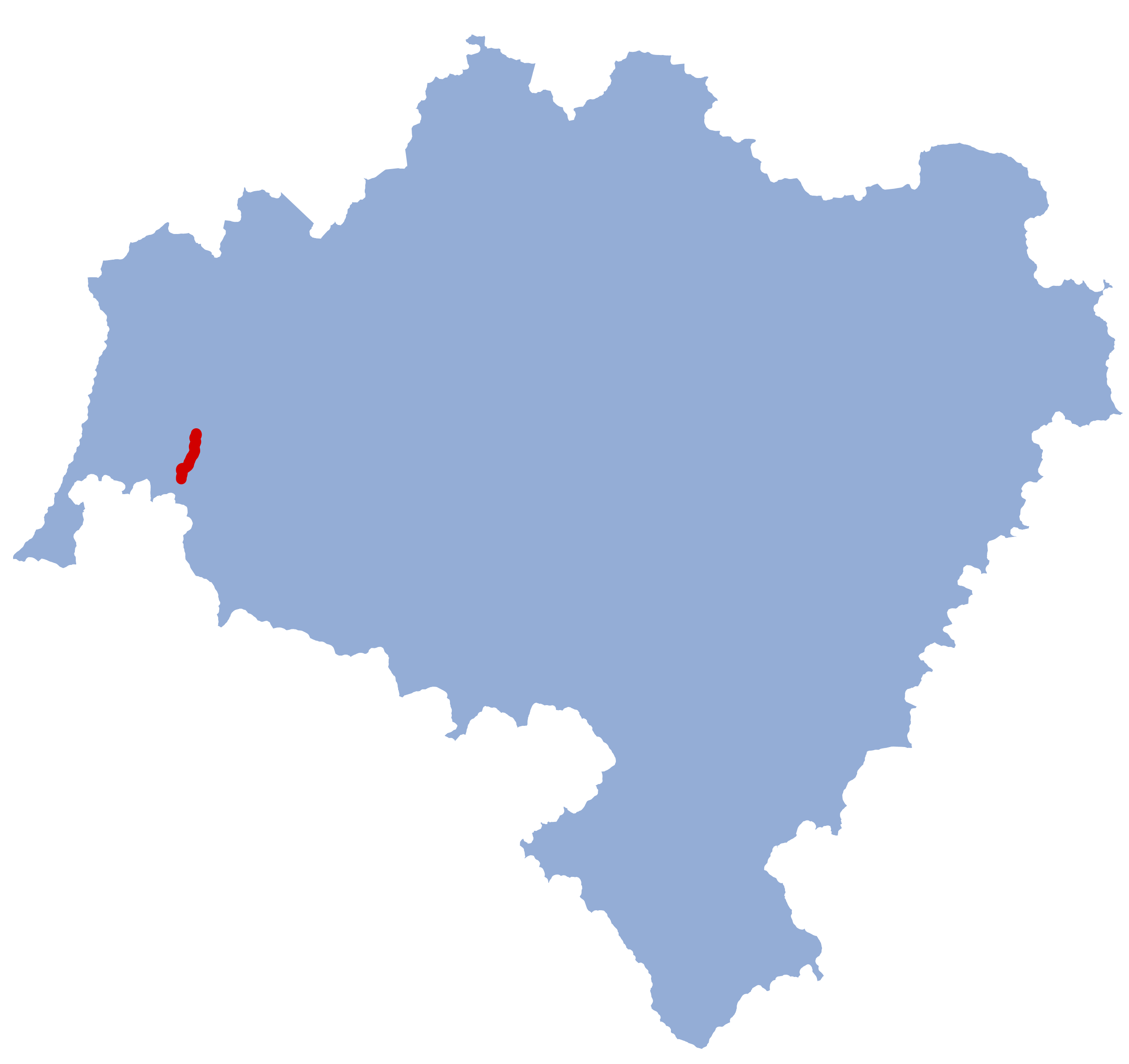

Lubań–Leśna railway is a single-track, non-electrified local significance railway line with a length of 11.155 km. The line is located in the Lower Silesian Voivodeship, within the Lubań County area, in Poland. It belongs to PKP Polskie Linie Kolejowe Railway Line Plant in Wrocław and the Railway Line Plant in Wałbrzych.

The decision to build the line to Leśna along the Kwisa river valley was made in 1888, and it was opened on 15 May 1896. This line was primarily intended to stimulate economic development and serve the transport of products from nearby factories. Between 1928 and 1945, it had an overhead wire network. In 1991, passenger connections were suspended, and in 1994, freight connections followed. After 14 years, in 2008, the line was renovated and reopened. Currently, it serves as a freight line, mainly used for transporting basalt from nearby mines.

== Route of the line ==
The line begins at the Lubań Śląski railway station at km -0.284, where it connects with Wrocław Świebodzki–Zgorzelec railway at its 178.085 km. Initially, the line runs southwards, then turns southwest at the height of Księginki (southern part of Lubań), and at the height of the Lubań Księginki track siding (km 1.562), it turns south. At the level crossing, it intersects with the provincial road no. 393 (km 1.452), and then continues southward to the Kościelniki Górne railway station (km 8.081), from where the line turns west. Along the way, it crosses the provincial road no. 393 four more times (km 4.224, 5.090, 7.096, and 8.051) and the Kwisa river. At the border with the town of Leśna, the line turns south and runs parallel to the Kwisa river, and after the penultimate crossing with road no. 393 (Baworowo Street, km 9.645), it runs parallel to this street. After the last crossing, it reaches the Leśna Gravel Plant track siding (km 10.315) and further to the last loading station at Leśna (km 10.831). The line ends at km 10.871, with a height difference of 18 m between the first and last traffic posts.

Throughout its entire length, the line runs through the Izera Foothills, according to Jerzy Kondracki's physical-geographical division, parallel along the valley of the Kwisa river, and administratively through the city of Lubań, Gmina Lubań, and Gmina Leśna.

== History ==
=== Origins ===
By the late 19th century, the main railway network of Prussia was already well-established. The Prussian state railways, benefiting from the favorable economic conditions following the victorious war against France in 1871, extensively expanded their network with numerous local lines aimed at stimulating economic activity in previously declining regions. This investment activity was particularly significant in the foothill counties of the Province of Silesia: Lubań, Lwówek, Złotoryja, and Bolków. This area, once economically vibrant, was experiencing a decline in the 1880s due to population migration to large industrial centers, resulting from the collapse of traditional crafts and the lack of convenient transportation routes.

Typically, the densification of the railway network in Silesia and other German provinces involved extending a branch from an existing main line to a center without rail service, which would be gradually extended to the next main line if possible. The Lubań–Leśna line has a similar origin, preceded by the construction of the first section of the Silesian Mountain Railway (Zgorzelec–Kłodzko Główne) between Zgorzelec and Rybnica, including the Lubań Śląski railway station and a branch to Węgliniec. These lines, along with the Lubań railway station, which was a junction station from the beginning, were opened on 20 August 1865. The routing of the main line considered the economic needs of the region, which was once famous for exporting linen and cotton but had lost its competitiveness due to a lack of communication.

Over time, a siding was extended from the main line to a quarry in Księginki. This route was partially used later for constructing the line to Leśna.

=== Before 1945 ===
The first decisions regarding the construction of the Lubań–Leśna line were made in 1888. Building a branch to Leśna was intended to facilitate the transport of products from nearby factories, including the Concordia spinning and weaving mill in Leśna, which became one of the largest in the region. A catastrophic flood in the Kwisa river valley in August 1888 temporarily halted the project.

Eventually, the line to Leśna was built (partially on the route of the existing siding to the quarry) in 1896, with transport commencing on May 15. Leśna was the last town in the then Lubań County without railway communication. The line initially had a local character, with pre-war trains with 2nd and 3rd class carriages covering the entire route in 34 minutes.

On 22 June 1928, as part of the electrification of the former Silesian Mountain Railway and its branch lines, the electric network on the entire line was put into operation, and seasonal trains were launched to Leśna. Following the damming of the Kwisa river in the village of Czocha in June 1905, forming Lake Leśnia, the town, previously known for the Czocha Castle, became a popular holiday destination.

=== Post-war years ===
In 1945, the territories of Lower Silesia were incorporated into Poland, and the entire discussed line came under Polish State Railways' management. Immediately after its takeover, in June 1945, transport resumed using the German electric rolling stock left on the line and operated by German personnel until July 1945. In August 1945, Soviet troops dismantled the traction network and took the electric trains to the Soviet Union, returning steam trains to the line. The line's importance diminished as seasonal trains no longer ran to Leśna.

Passenger transport on the entire line was suspended on 1 October 1991, and freight transport on the section from the Księginki track siding to Leśna on 1 January 1994. In 2001, the Lubań County Council opposed the line's liquidation. By 2006, the line was impassable, broken between Kościelnik and Leśna.

In 2008, the line was renovated and reopened for freight traffic on August 11. Since its reactivation, there have been two train derailments. The first occurred on 22 July 2011 when two wagons derailed and a third went off the tracks near Kościelniki Górne. The second happened on 13 December 2013 at a railway-road crossing in Kościelniki Średnie, where five wagons derailed, damaging 50 meters of track, likely due to a faulty wagon.

On 21 May 2011, the Lower Silesian Railways company, together with railway enthusiasts, organized a special train ride along lines in the western part of Lower Silesia not used for passenger traffic, including the Lubań–Leśna route.

On 19 September 2015, to celebrate 150 years of railway communication in Lubań, two special passenger train rides were planned on the Lubań–Leśna route in both directions. Due to high interest, a third ride was organized. These rides were serviced by the Lower Silesian Railways company. During this time, a presentation on the history of the Lubań-Leśna connection was held at the Leśna railway station, along with a mini-hike along the Perłowy Trail along the Kwisa river.

== Characteristics ==
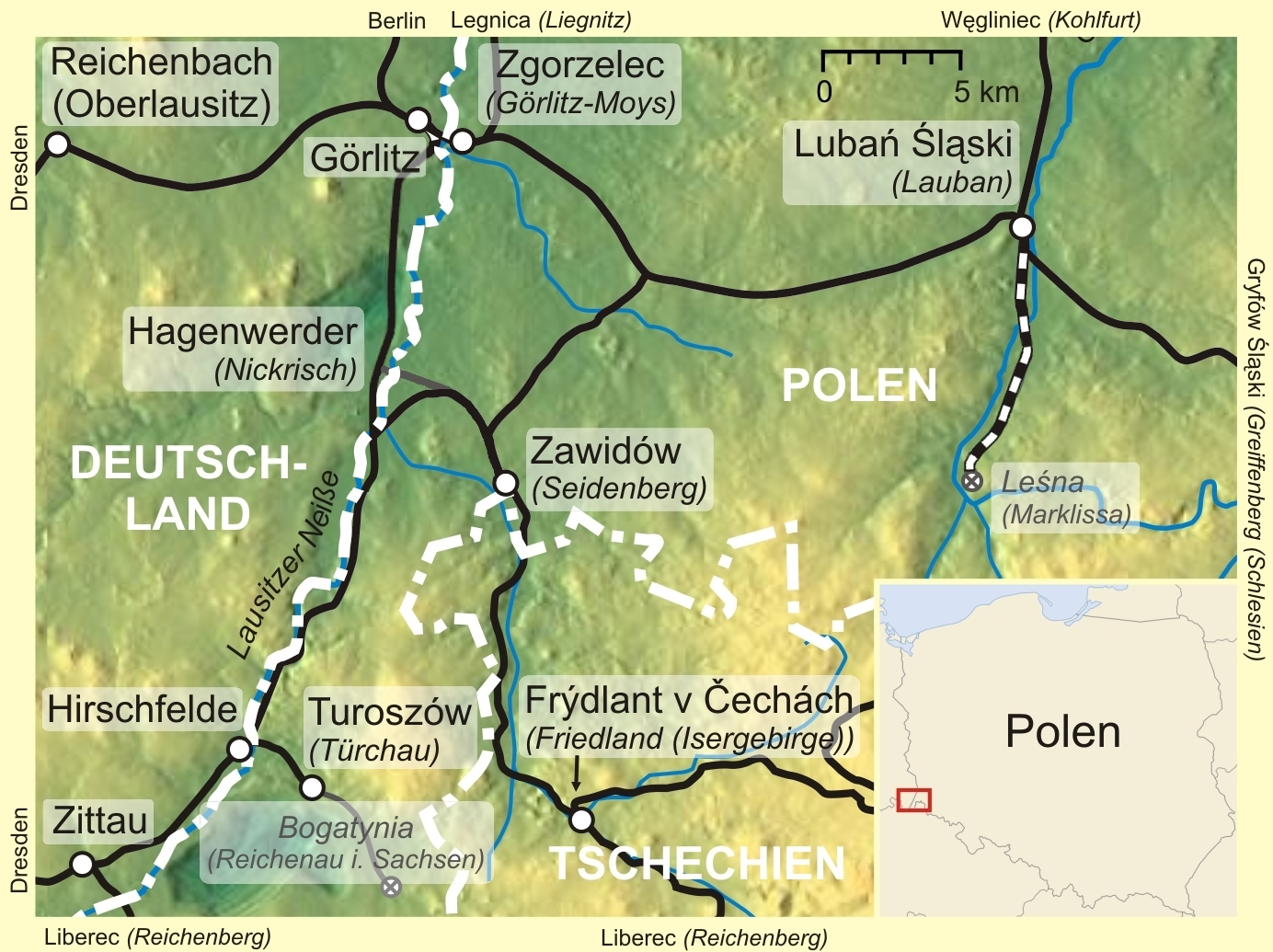
Location of Lubań–Leśna railway in relation to the nearby railway network

The line extends over a total distance of 11.155 km and is managed by PKP Polskie Linie Kolejowe. It is entirely a single-track, non-electrified line. It is not equipped with automatic train stop electromagnets.

The elevation difference between Lubań Śląski station and the Leśna public loading yard is 18 m, with an average gradient of 1.6‰.

As of 2013, the following maximum speeds and line classes apply to the discussed section:

Kilometrage		Class	Speed		
from	to	Class	passenger	railcar	freight
–0.284	10.871	C3	40	40	30

== Infrastructure ==
=== Operational points ===
Name	Km (axis)	Elevation (m)	Type	Number of platform edges	Infrastructure	Picture
Lubań Śląski railway station	0.000	215	station	4	railway station, freight warehouse, loading ramp and yard, steam locomotive depot, repair workshops, water tower, 3 signal boxes	
Księginki railway station (disused)	1.305	215	passenger stop	1	none	
Lubań Księginki	1.562	215	track siding	0	none	
Kościelnik railway station	2.927	219	passenger stop	1	station building with warehouse, toilets, utility buildings, loading yard	
Kościelniki Średnie railway station (disused)	5.028	220	passenger stop	1	none	
Kościelniki Dolne	6.057	222	passenger stop	1	station building with warehouse, toilets, utility buildings, loading yard and side-end ramp	
Kościelniki Górne railway station	8.081	227	passenger stop	1	none	
Leśna Aggregate Plant	10.315	233	track siding	0	none	
Leśna railway station	10.831	233	public loading yard and passenger stop (formerly a station)	1	station building with warehouse, toilets, utility buildings, loading yard and side-end ramp	

=== Bridges and viaducts ===
There is one bridge along the entire route. It is a truss bridge with a length of 136.35 m, located at the 3.582-kilometer mark between the Kościelnik and Kościelniki Średnie stops.

== Train operations ==
Since 11 August 2008, after its reactivation, the line has been used for freight traffic. It primarily transports basalt from the reopened quarries in Grabiszyce Górne and Miłoszów. There are two active track sidings for freight traffic: Lubań Księginki (km 1.562) and Leśna Aggregate Plant (km 10.315).

=== Scheduled passenger trains on the line in various years ===
Year/Period	Number of connection pairs	Average travel time	Average commercial speed (km/h)	Source
1946	2	0:37	18	
1950	4	0:37	18	
1960/1961	4	0:24	28	
1970/1971	3	0:35	19	
1980/1981	4	0:37	18	
1990/1992	2	0:34	19	
