= Gmina Leśna =

Gmina Leśna Leśna Commune
- Gmina
- Flag Coat of arms
- Interactive map of Gmina Leśna
- Coordinates (Leśna): 51°1′25″N 15°16′0″E
- Country: Poland
- Voivodeship: Lower Silesian
- County: Lubań
- Seat: Leśna
- Sołectwos: Bartoszówka, Grabiszyce Dolne, Grabiszyce Górne, Grabiszyce Średnie, Kościelniki Górne, Kościelniki Średnie, Miłoszów, Pobiedna, Smolnik, Stankowice, Świecie, Szyszkowa, Wolimierz, Zacisze, Złotniki Lubańskie, Złoty Potok

Area
  - Total: 104.5 km^{2} (40.3 sq mi)

Population (2019-06-30)
  - Total: 10,013
  - Density: 95.82/km^{2} (248.2/sq mi)
- Website: http://www.lesna.pl

Gmina Leśna is an urban-rural gmina (administrative district) in Lubań County, Lower Silesian Voivodeship, in south-western Poland. Its seat is the town of Leśna, which lies approximately 11 kilometres (7 mi) south of Lubań, and 125 kilometres (78 mi) west of the regional capital Wrocław.

The gmina covers an area of 104.5 square kilometres (40.3 sq mi), and as of 2019 its total population is 10,013.

== Neighbouring gminas ==
Gmina Leśna is bordered by the town of Świeradów-Zdrój and the gminas of Gryfów Śląski, Lubań, Mirsk, Olszyna and Platerówka. It also borders the Czech Republic.

== Villages ==
Apart from the town of Leśna, the gmina contains the villages of Bartoszówka, Grabiszyce Dolne, Grabiszyce Górne, Grabiszyce Średnie, Kościelniki Górne, Kościelniki Górne-Janówka, Kościelniki Średnie, Miłoszów, Pobiedna, Smolnik, Smolnik-Jurków, Stankowice, Stankowice-Sucha, Świecie, Szyszkowa, Wolimierz, Zacisze, Złotniki Lubańskie and Złoty Potok.

== Twin towns – sister cities ==
Gmina Leśna is twinned with:

- Dolní Řasnice, Czech Republic (1999)
- Horní Řasnice, Czech Republic (1999)
- Jindřichovice pod Smrkem, Czech Republic (1999)
- Nové Město pod Smrkem, Czech Republic (1999)
- Leutersdorf, Germany (2000)
- Wyrzysk, Poland (2003)
- Schönau-Berzdorf, Germany (2013)
