= Wolimierz =

- Village
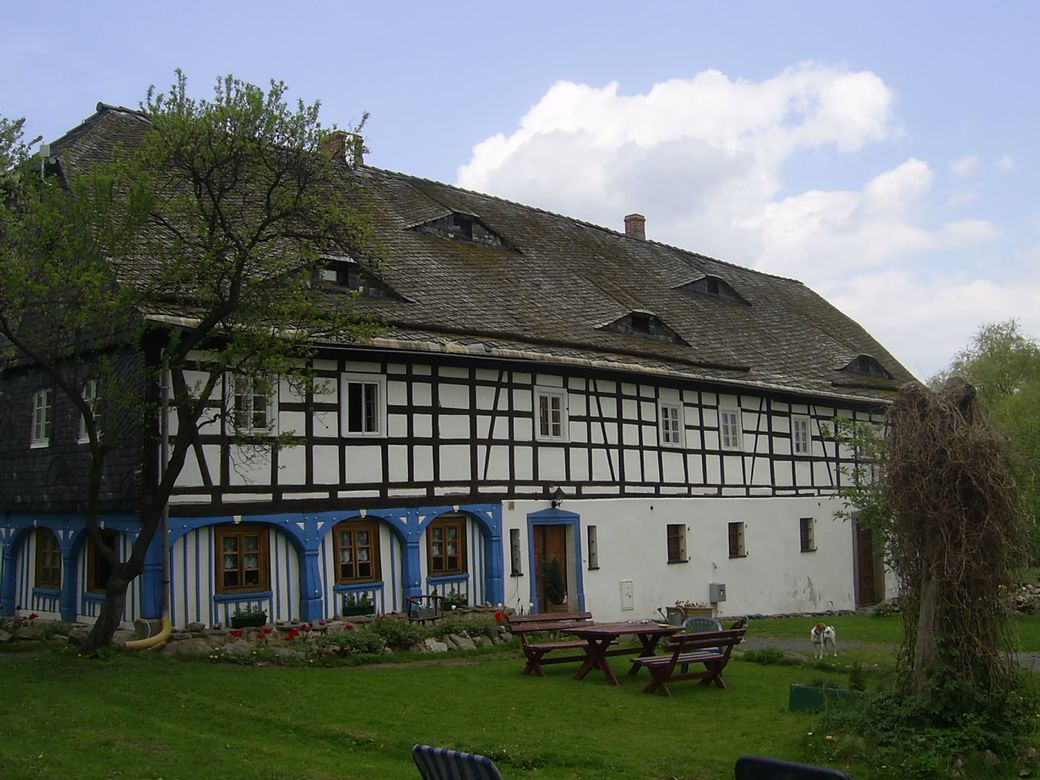
- Upper Lusatian house in Wolimierz

- Location within Poland
- Coordinates: 50°57′16″N 15°18′53″E
- Country: Poland
- Voivodeship: Lower Silesian
- County: Lubań
- Gmina: Leśna

Population (approx.)
  - Total: 317
- Time zone: UTC+1 (CET)
  - Summer (DST): UTC+2 (CEST)
- Vehicle registration: DLB

Wolimierz [vɔˈlimjɛʂ] is a village in the administrative district of Gmina Leśna, within Lubań County, Lower Silesian Voivodeship, in south-western Poland, near the Czech border. The nearest towns are Mirsk and Świeradów-Zdrój.

The area has traditional houses (Upper Lusatian houses) and Catholic churches in which German influence can be devised. Wolimierz and the nearby villages like Pobiedna are also known as places for ecological tourism, encouraged by the good conditions of the road infrastructure.

The cultural life in the area has been promoted lately by the Stacja Wolimierz gallery and theatre, located in the abandoned train station of Wolimierz. There are several international festivals and workshops that are held there each year.
