= Zangenberg =

Zangenberg may refer to:

- Zangenberg, a division of the town of Zeitz in Saxony-Anhalt, Germany
- European family name, dating back at least to the early 15th century.
- Zangenberg, height near Leśna, Poland; with Zangenburg Castle (see See also)

== People ==
- Christian Zangenberg (1853–1914), Danish royal actor
- Einar Zangenberg (1882–1918), Danish actor
- Jan Zangenberg (1927–1992), Danish actor, founded several Danish theatres during the 1960s
- Julie Zangenberg (born 1988), Danish actress
- Jürgen Zangenberg (born 1964), German New Testament scholar and archaeologist

== See also ==
- Zangberg, municipality in Bavaria
  - Georg, Elisabeth, and Barbara von Zangberg, illegitimate children of Henry XVI, Duke of Bavaria (1386-1450)
- Zangeburg: name of two former castles, now fully gone (burgstall):
  - Zangenbuurg or Sangschloss in Germany
  - Zangenburg or Lesne/Leśna Castle near Leśna in Poland
