= Zacisze, Lower Silesian Voivodeship =

Zacisze
- Village
- Location within Poland
- Coordinates: 51°0′16″N 15°22′36″E
- Country: Poland
- Voivodeship: Lower Silesian
- County: Lubań
- Gmina: Leśna
- Elevation: 360 m (1,180 ft)
- Time zone: UTC+1 (CET)
  - Summer (DST): UTC+2 (CEST)
- Vehicle registration: DLB

Zacisze [zaˈt͡ɕiʂɛ] is a village in the administrative district of Gmina Leśna, within Lubań County, Lower Silesian Voivodeship, in south-western Poland.

== History ==
During World War II, the German Nazi administration operated the E227 forced labour subcamp of the Stalag VIII-B/344 prisoner-of-war camp in the village.
