= Grabiszyce Średnie =

- Village
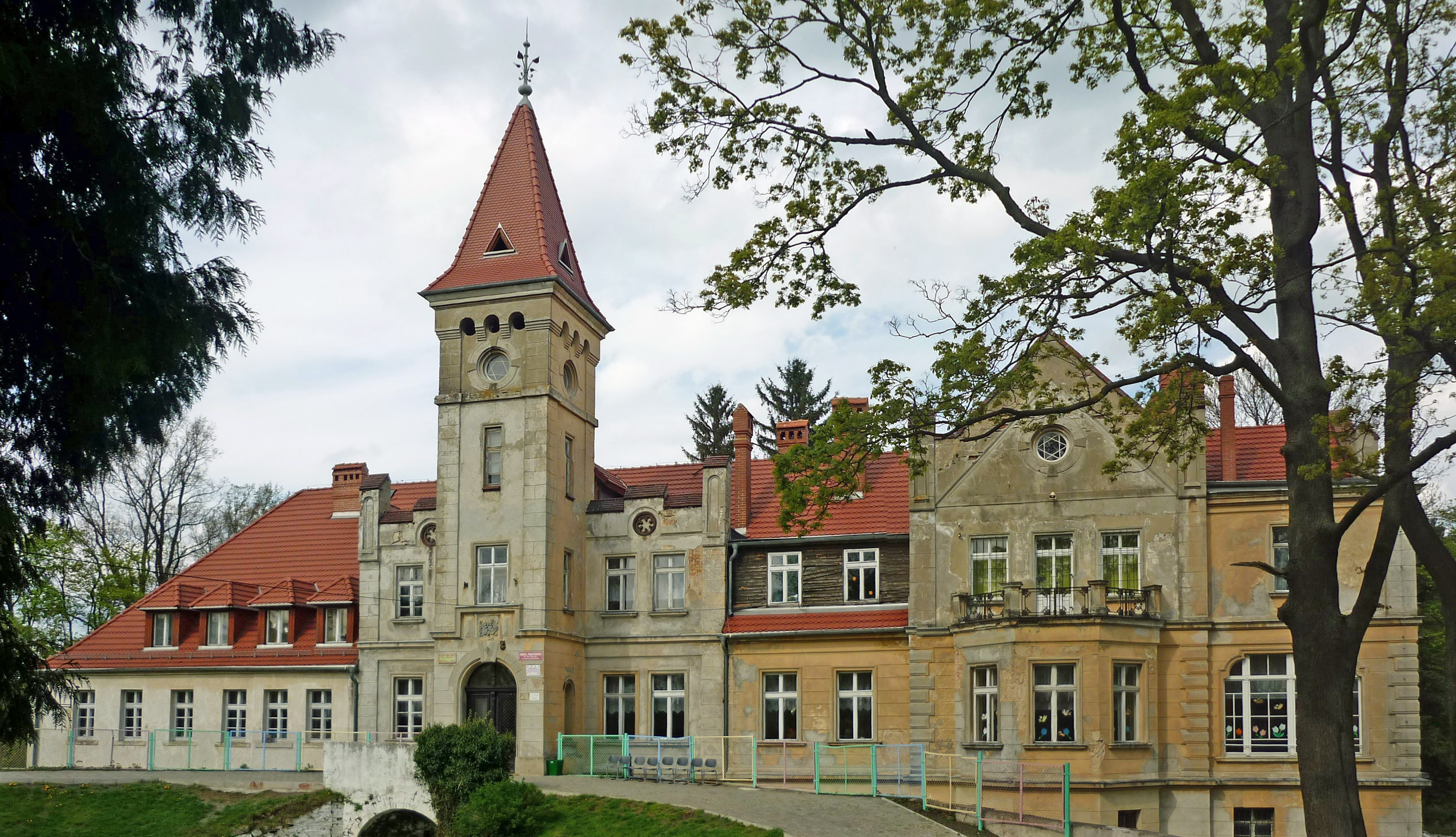
- Palace

- Location within Poland
- Coordinates: 51°00′53″N 15°12′00″E
- Country: Poland
- Voivodeship: Lower Silesian
- County: Lubań
- Gmina: Leśna

Grabiszyce Średnie [ɡrabiˈʂɨt͡sɛ ˈɕrɛdɲɛ] is a village in the administrative district of Gmina Leśna, within Lubań County, Lower Silesian Voivodeship, in south-western Poland.
