= Złoty Potok =

Złoty Potok (meaning "golden stream" in Polish) may refer to the following places:

- Złoty Potok, Lower Silesian Voivodeship (south-west Poland)
- Złoty Potok, Lubusz Voivodeship (west Poland)
- Złoty Potok, Silesian Voivodeship (south Poland)
- Złoty Potok, Polish name for Zolotyi Potik, a town near Buchach in Ukraine
