= Złotniki Lubańskie =

- Village
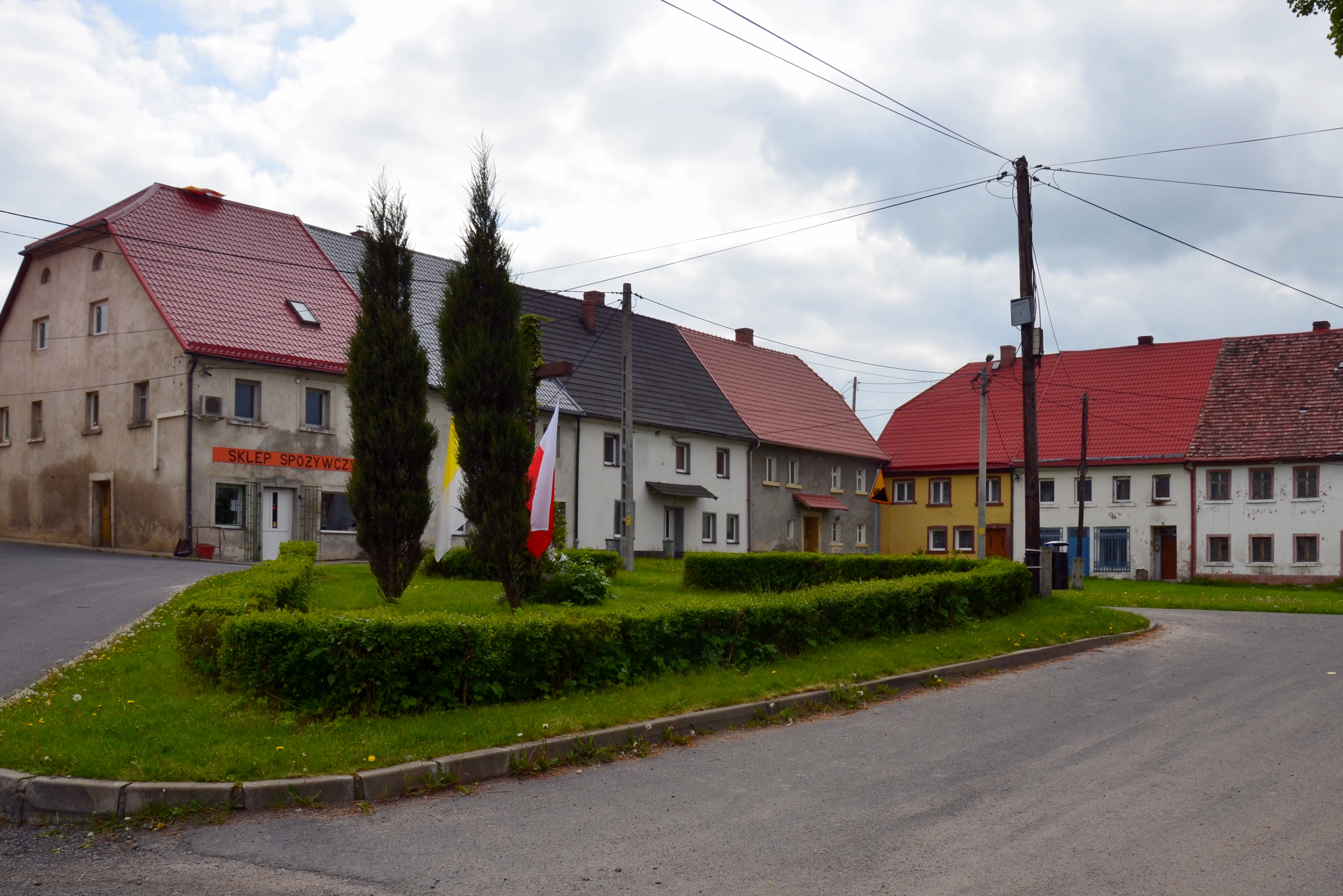
- Rynek (Market Square)

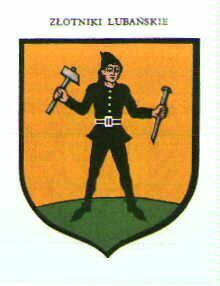
- Coat of arms

- Location within Poland
- Coordinates: 51°1′N 15°21′E
- Country: Poland
- Voivodeship: Lower Silesian
- County: Lubań
- Gmina: Leśna

Population
  - Total: 214
- Time zone: UTC+1 (CET)
  - Summer (DST): UTC+2 (CEST)
- Vehicle registration: DLB

Złotniki Lubańskie [zwɔtˈniki luˈbaɲskʲɛ] is a village in the administrative district of Gmina Leśna, within Lubań County, Lower Silesian Voivodeship, in south-western Poland. Situated on the left bank of the Kwisa river, the settlement was formerly part of the historic Upper Lusatia region at the border with Silesia.

== History ==
The estates belonged to the Nostitz noble family at Czocha Castle, who about 1660 operated a gold mine here. The settlement of expelled members of the Bohemian Unity of the Brethren received market rights by Elector John George II of Saxony in 1672. According to the Final Act of the 1815 Vienna Congress, Goldentraum passed from Saxony to the Kingdom of Prussia and was incorporated into the Silesia Province. After World War I, a river dam of the Kwisa (Jezioro Złotnickie) was erected above Lake Leśnia laid out in 1905. After the defeat of Nazi Germany in World War II, with the implementation of the Oder-Neisse line in 1945, the area passed to the Republic of Poland.
