= Grabiszyce Dolne =

- Village
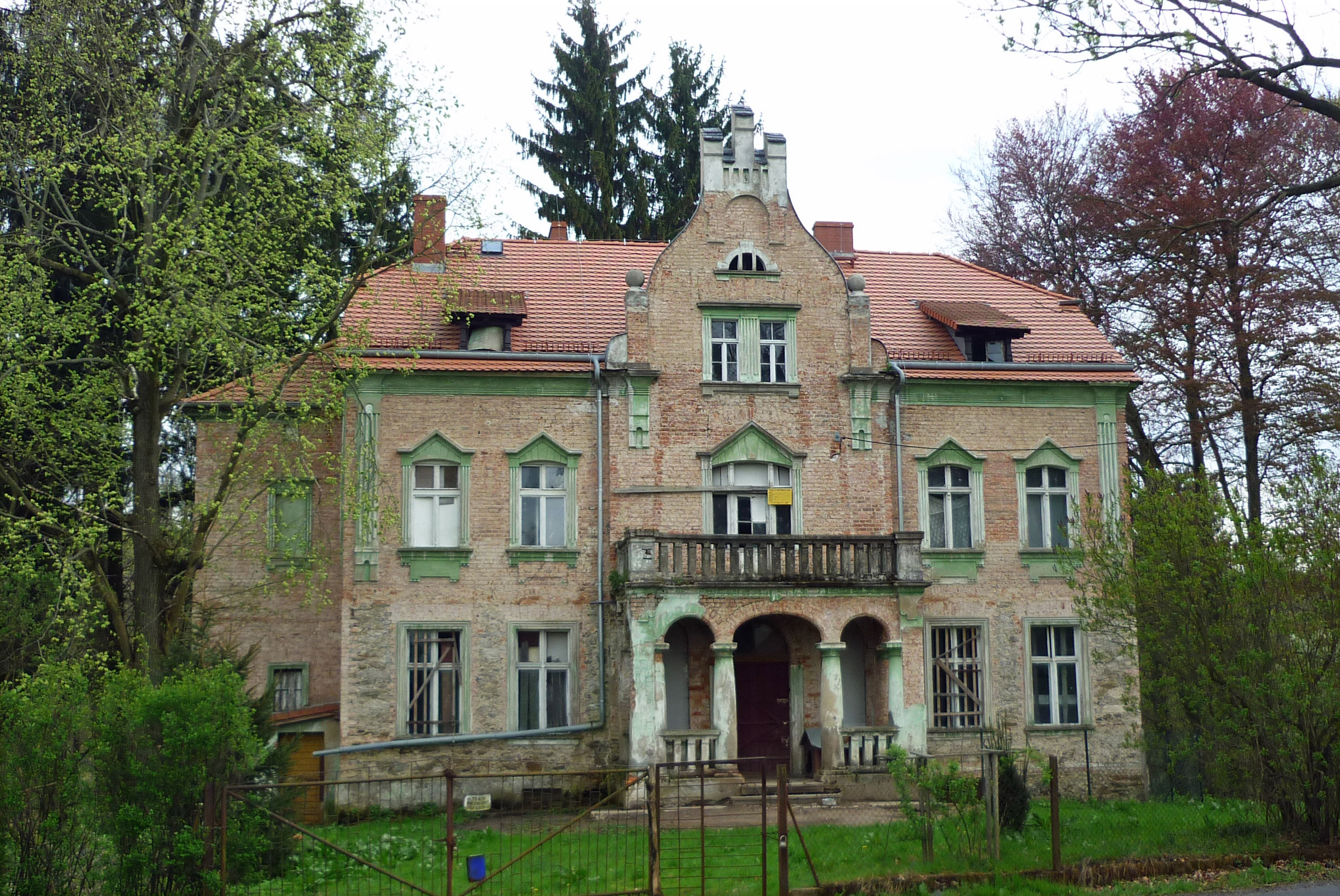
- Palace

- Location within Poland
- Coordinates: 51°01′42″N 15°13′15″E
- Country: Poland
- Voivodeship: Lower Silesian
- County: Lubań
- Gmina: Leśna

Grabiszyce Dolne [ɡrabiˈʂɨt͡sɛ ˈdɔlnɛ] is a village in the administrative district of Gmina Leśna, within Lubań County, Lower Silesian Voivodeship, in south-western Poland.
