= Thusnelda von Saldern =

German deaconess and author

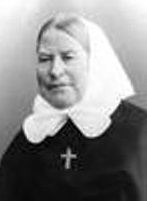
Thusnelda von Saldern

Thusnelda von Saldern (full name Thusnelda Johanna Sophie Marie Eveline von Saldern; born 3 October 1837 in Potsdam; died 12 May 1910 in Hoym, Anhalt) was a German deaconess and writer.

== Life ==
Thusnelda von Saldern was born into a Protestant family in Potsdam. She and her twin sister were the eldest of their parents' five recorded children. Gustav von Saldern-Plattenburg, her father, was a "lord of the manor" and a Prussian district administrator from Brandenburg. Her mother, by birth a countess of Seherr-Thoß, came from one of the region's aristocratic families: it was on their mother's family lands that the children grew up, on the Meffersdorf estate (Lauban district). The family was one with close church connections and the children benefited from a traditional upper-class upbringing. Her first piece of written work, a translation for the theologian-publisher Johann Hinrich Wichern (1808-1881), appeared in 1854 when she was only 17.

After completing her education, she undertook a training as a nurse at the "Bethanien" a Deaconesses' establishment in Breslau. Then, after her parents died, for some time she ran the household for her uncle before moving on to a Marienberg monastery for a further period of vocational training. From there she moved on again, to the Oberlin House in Potsdam. The recently founded Oberlin Association, named after the social reformer and evangelical minister Johann Friedrich Oberlin, had been set up to organise and promote the care and education of young children. She was recruited on 26 October 1879 as first deaconess and first "matron of the sisterhood" at the new Oberlin House. She had been working with the association since 1874, but it was only five years after that that they acquired their own purpose-built premises. Over the decades that followed she was responsible for training numerous young women and deaconesses for work in a range of social and diaconal fields. That included community care work, nursery school work, hospital/infirmary work and positions in care homes for physically handicapped and deaf-mute children. Nearly 150 years later the Oberlin House still occupies the same premises in Potsdam and continues to focus on the priorities that were established when Thusnelda von Saldern was in charge.

In 1905 she retired from her position at Oberlin House, relocating to the "Buchenhaus" Hospice in Grenzdorf bei Weigandsthal (Silesia) where she worked as a "house mother". The establishment was one that she had herself set up as sister institution of the Oberlin House.

In 1909 she moved to Hoym where she died the next year. Her body was buried on 16 May 1910, the Monday following Pentecost at the "Goethe Cemetery" (as it is known today) in Potsdam.

== Published output ==
Thusnelda von Saldern wrote religiously inspired novels and stories, including novel Das Margaretenbuch, which was released under numerous new editions and was also translated into English.

- Drei Bausteine. Wolfenbüttel 1863 (3rd edition).
- Das Margaretenbuch. Eine Erzählung aus Lothringen. Braunschweig 1875; Bahn, Schwerin 1941.
- Ruth. Eine Erzählung für Kinder. Wolfenbüttel 1877.
- Reisebriefe aus Schweden. Wolfenbüttel 1896.
- Frei zum Dienst. Lichtbilder aus dem Diakonissenleben. Wolfenbüttel 1902.

== Celebration ==
In 2007, the Oberlin Association opened a new accommodation and rehabilitation block for accident victims. The new building was named the Thusnelda-von-Saldern-Haus.
