= Stankowice =

- Village
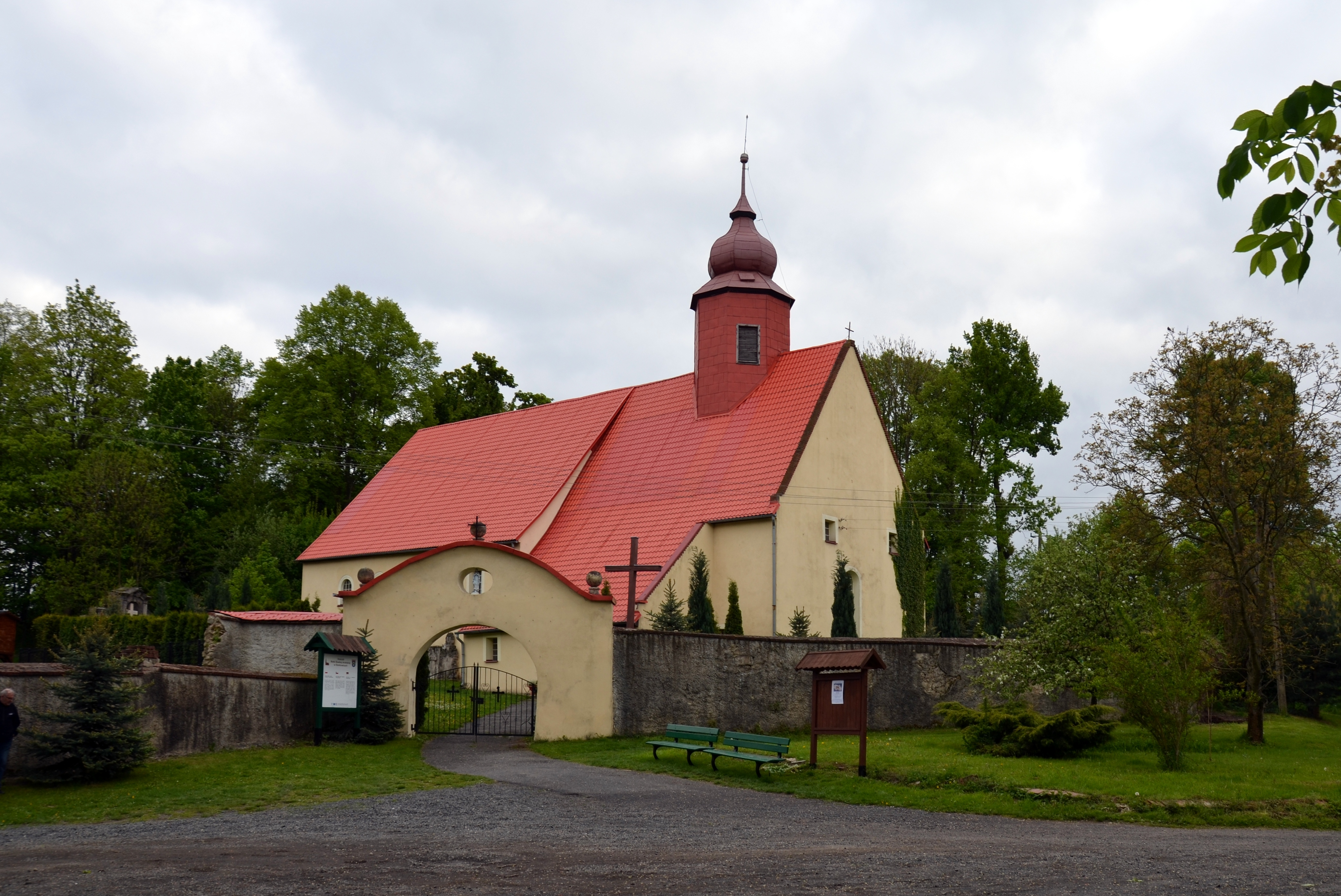
- Catholic church

- Location within Poland
- Coordinates: 51°1′12″N 15°18′54″E
- Country: Poland
- Voivodeship: Lower Silesian
- County: Lubań
- Gmina: Leśna

Stankowice [staŋkɔˈvit͡sɛ] is a village in the administrative district of Gmina Leśna, within Lubań County, Lower Silesian Voivodeship, in south-western Poland.
