= Maria Makowska =

Polish footballer (born 1969)

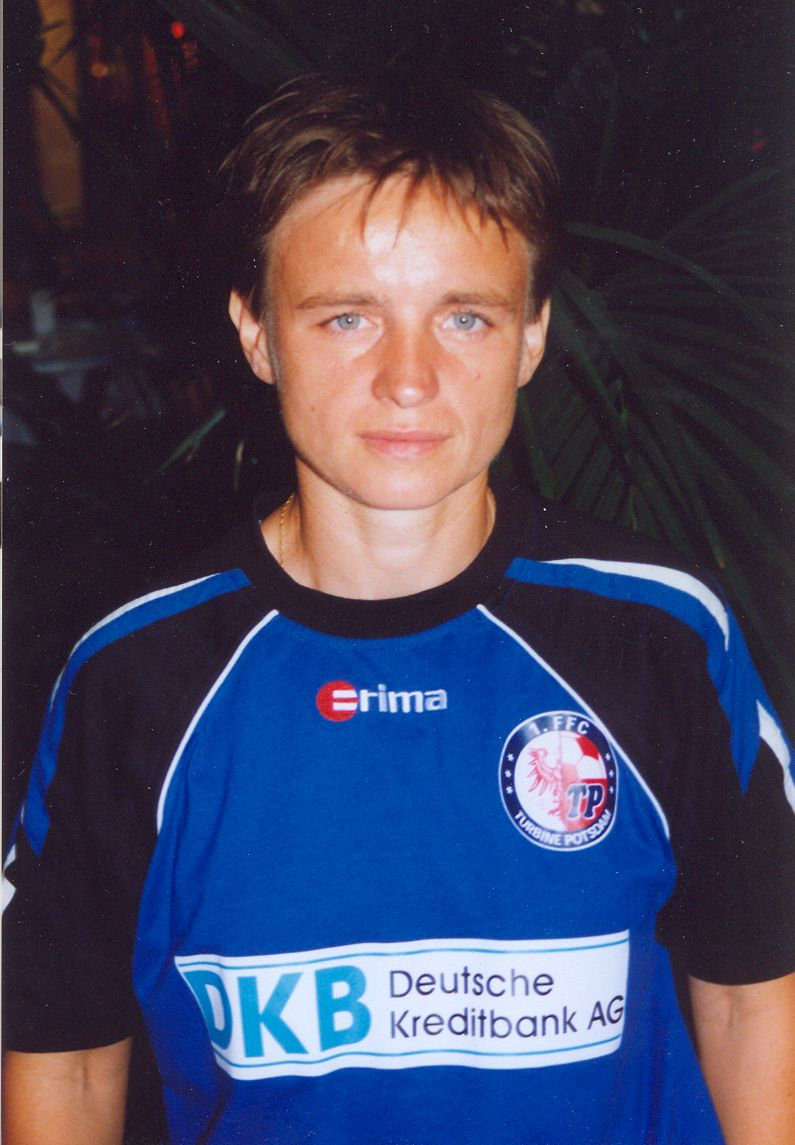

Personal information
- Full name: Maria Makowska
- Date of birth: 25 January 1969 (age 57)
- Place of birth: Złotniki Lubańskie, Poland
- Position: Midfielder

Senior career*
Years	Team	Apps	(Gls)
1985–1993	Pafawag Wrocław		
1993–1996	Stilon Gorzów		
1996–2004	Turbine Potsdam		
2004–2005	ŽNK Krka		
2005–?	Post SV Nürnberg		
?–2009	TSV Kleinschwarzenlohe		
2009–2012	SV 67 Weinberg		

International career
1988–2010	Poland	111	(5)
- * Club domestic league appearances and goals

Maria Makowska (born 25 January 1969) is a Polish former footballer who played as a midfielder. With 111 caps, she is the Poland women's national team second most-capped player.

Makowska began her career playing club football for Pafawag Wrocław and Stilon Gorzów in the Polish Ekstraliga. She moved to Germany where she enjoyed success with 1. FFC Turbine Potsdam, winning the 2003–04 Frauen-Bundesliga, 2003–04 DFB-Pokal Frauen and the 2004 DFB-Hallenpokal.

Having made her debut for the Poland national team in 1988, she went on to make 111 international appearances, including 16 FIFA Women's World Cup qualifying matches, and score five goals.

== Career statistics ==
=== International ===
Appearances and goals by national team and year
National team	Year	Apps	Goals
Poland	1988	1	0
Poland	1989	5	2
Poland	1990	2	0
Poland	1991	8	1
Poland	1992	4	0
Poland	1993	10	0
Poland	1994	6	0
Poland	1995	9	1
Poland	1996	7	0
Poland	1997	3	0
Poland	1998	7	0
Poland	1999	6	0
Poland	2000	3	0
Poland	2001	8	0
Poland	2002	5	0
Poland	2003	3	0
Poland	2004	4	0
Poland	2005	9	0
Poland	2006	4	1
Poland	2008	6	0
Poland	2010	1	0
Total		111	5

== Honours ==
Turbine Pottsdam

- Frauen-Bundesliga: 2003–04
- DFB-Pokal Frauen: 2003–04
- DFB-Hallenpokal: 2004
