= Smolnik, Lower Silesian Voivodeship =

Smolnik
- Village
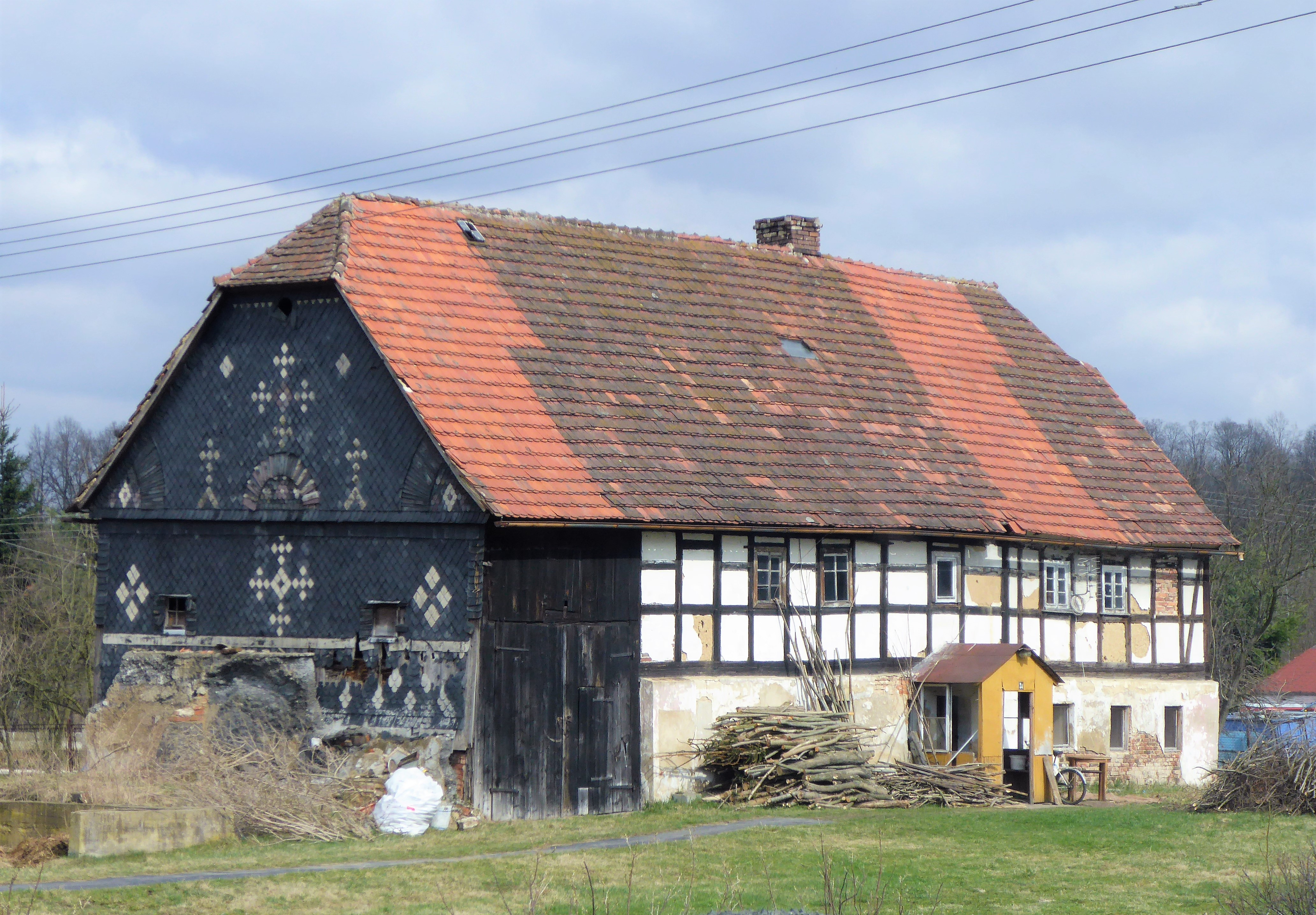

- Location within Poland
- Coordinates: 51°1′58″N 15°15′28″E
- Country: Poland
- Voivodeship: Lower Silesian
- County: Lubań
- Gmina: Leśna

Smolnik [ˈsmɔlɲik] (German: Schadewalde) is a village in the administrative district of Gmina Leśna, within Lubań County, Lower Silesian Voivodeship, in south-western Poland.
