= Bartoszówka, Lower Silesian Voivodeship =

Bartoszówka
- Village
- Location within Poland
- Coordinates: 51°00′13″N 15°21′32″E
- Country: Poland
- Voivodeship: Lower Silesian
- County: Lubań
- Gmina: Leśna

Bartoszówka [bartɔˈʂufka] is a village in the administrative district of Gmina Leśna, within Lubań County, Lower Silesian Voivodeship, in south-western Poland.
