= Smolnik-Jurków =

- Village
- Location within Poland
- Coordinates: 51°2′12″N 15°14′2″E
- Country: Poland
- Voivodeship: Lower Silesian
- County: Lubań
- Gmina: Leśna

Smolnik-Jurków [ˈsmɔlnik ˈjurkuf] is a village in the administrative district of Gmina Leśna, within Lubań County, Lower Silesian Voivodeship, in south-western Poland.
