= Kościelniki Górne-Janówka =

- Village
- Location within Poland
- Coordinates: 51°2′49″N 15°18′34″E
- Country: Poland
- Voivodeship: Lower Silesian
- County: Lubań
- Gmina: Leśna

Kościelniki Górne-Janówka [kɔɕt͡ɕɛlˈniki ˈɡurnɛ jaˈnufka] is a village in the administrative district of Gmina Leśna, within Lubań County, Lower Silesian Voivodeship, in south-western Poland.
