= Horní Řasnice =

- Municipality
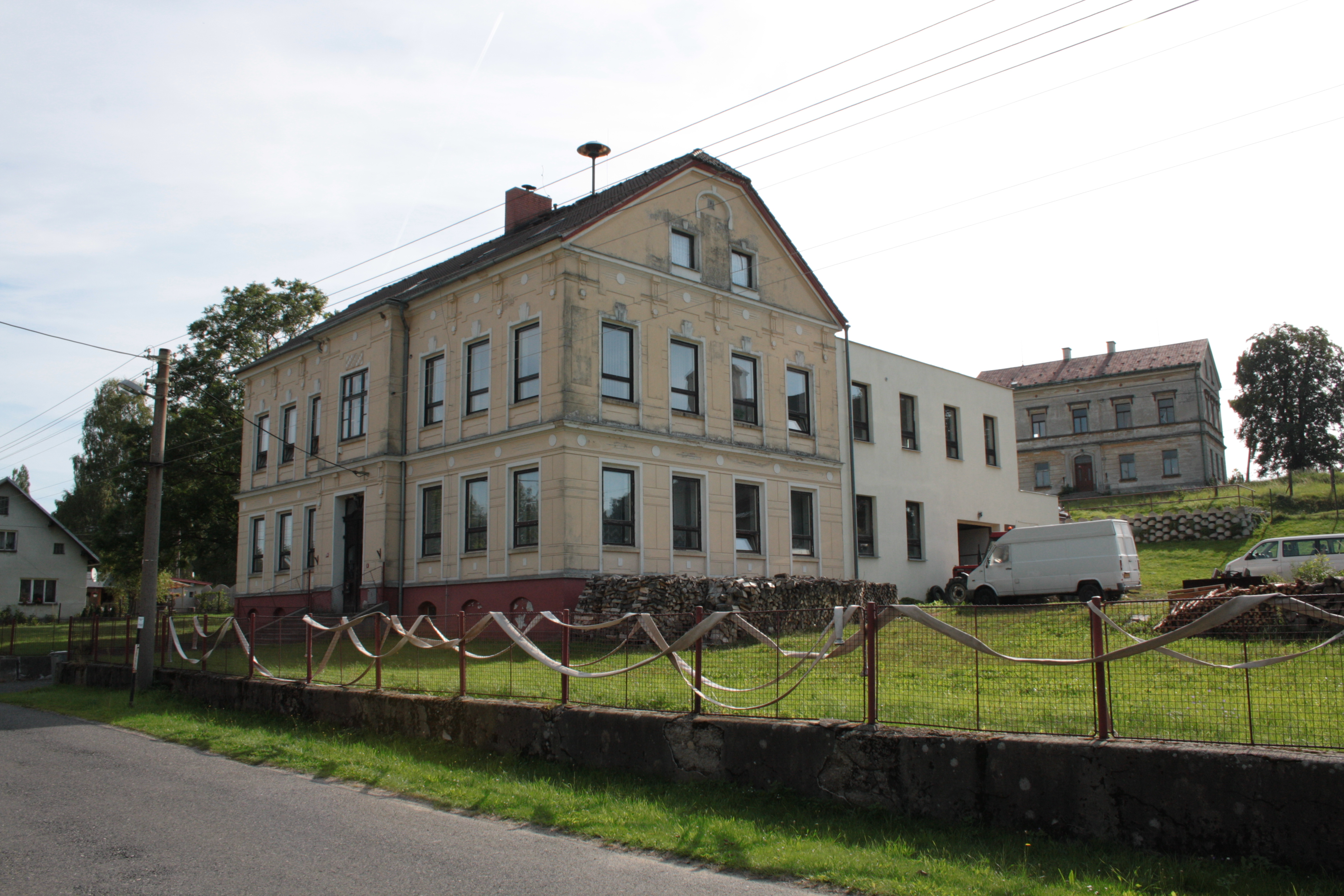
- Municipal office and primary school

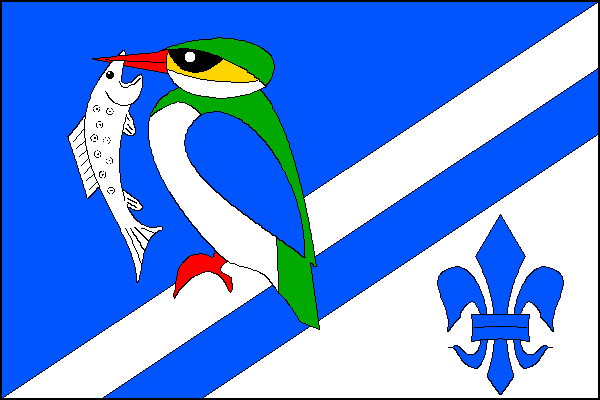
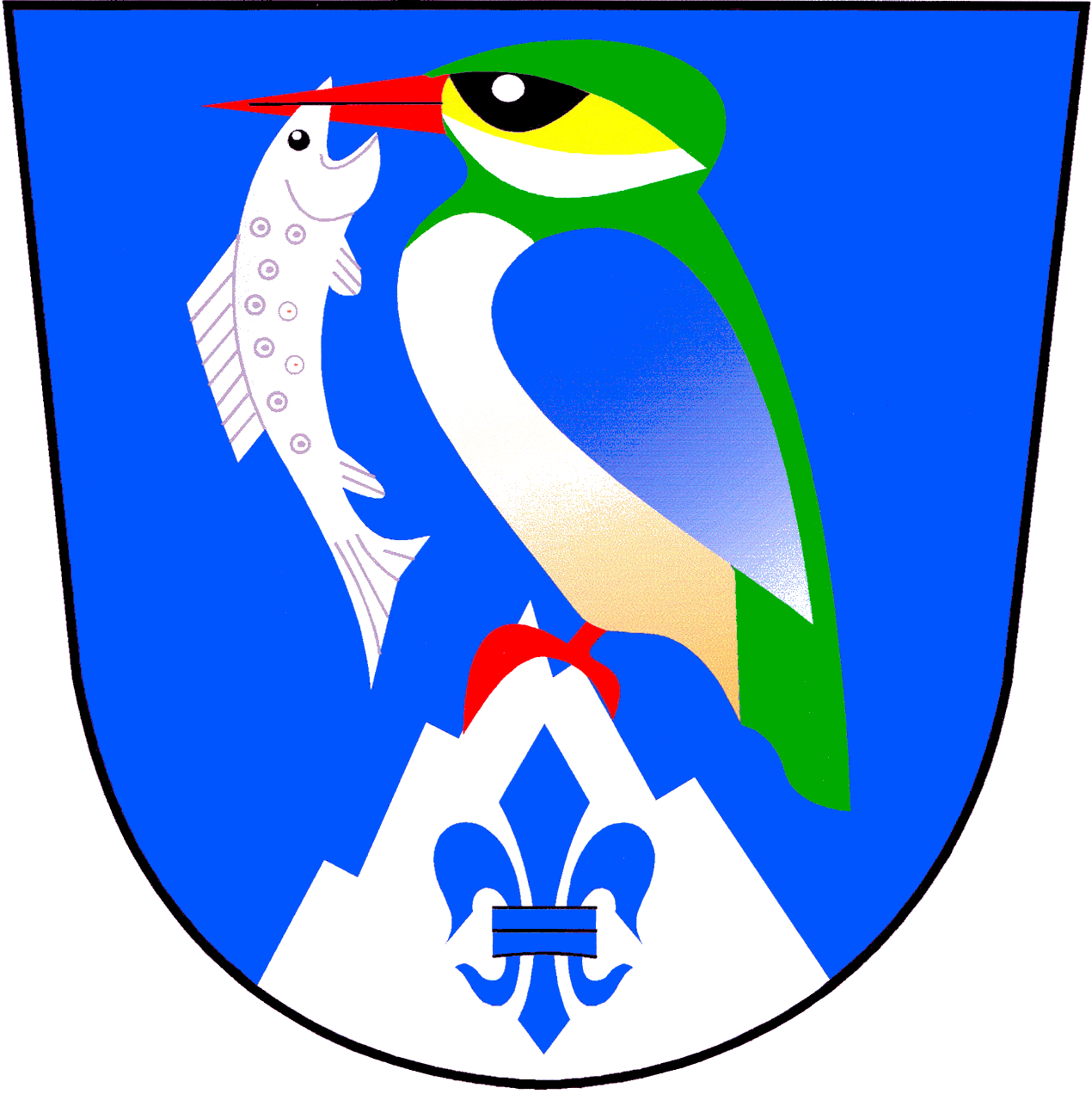
- Flag Coat of arms

- Location in the Czech Republic
- Coordinates: 50°57′56″N 15°12′6″E
- Country: Czech Republic
- Region: Liberec
- District: Liberec
- First mentioned: 1381

Area
  - Total: 19.04 km^{2} (7.35 sq mi)
- Elevation: 380 m (1,250 ft)

Population (2026-01-01)
  - Total: 230
  - Density: 12/km^{2} (31/sq mi)
- Time zone: UTC+1 (CET)
  - Summer (DST): UTC+2 (CEST)
- Postal code: 464 01
- Website: www.hornirasnice.cz

Horní Řasnice (German: Bärnsdorf an der Tafelfichte) is a municipality and village in Liberec District in the Liberec Region of the Czech Republic. It has about 200 inhabitants.

== Administrative division ==
Horní Řasnice consists of two municipal parts (in brackets population according to the 2021 census):

- Horní Řasnice (195)
- Srbská (41)

== Geography ==
Horní Řasnice is located about 23 kilometres (14 mi) northeast of Liberec, in a salient region of Frýdlant Hook on the border with Poland. It lies in the Jizera Foothills. The highest point is the hill Nad Nádražím at 522 m (1,713 ft) above sea level. The village of Horní Řasnice is situated in the valley of the Řasnice Stream, which originates in the municipal territory.

== History ==
The first written mention of Horní Řasnice is from 1381.

== Demographics ==
Historical population

Year	Pop.	±%
1869	1,855	—
1880	1,779	−4.1%
1890	1,751	−1.6%
1900	1,820	+3.9%
1910	1,721	−5.4%

Year	Pop.	±%
1921	1,467	−14.8%
1930	1,296	−11.7%
1950	502	−61.3%
1961	507	+1.0%
1970	456	−10.1%

Year	Pop.	±%
1980	294	−35.5%
1991	236	−19.7%
2001	235	−0.4%
2011	234	−0.4%
2021	236	+0.9%

Source: Censuses

== Transport ==
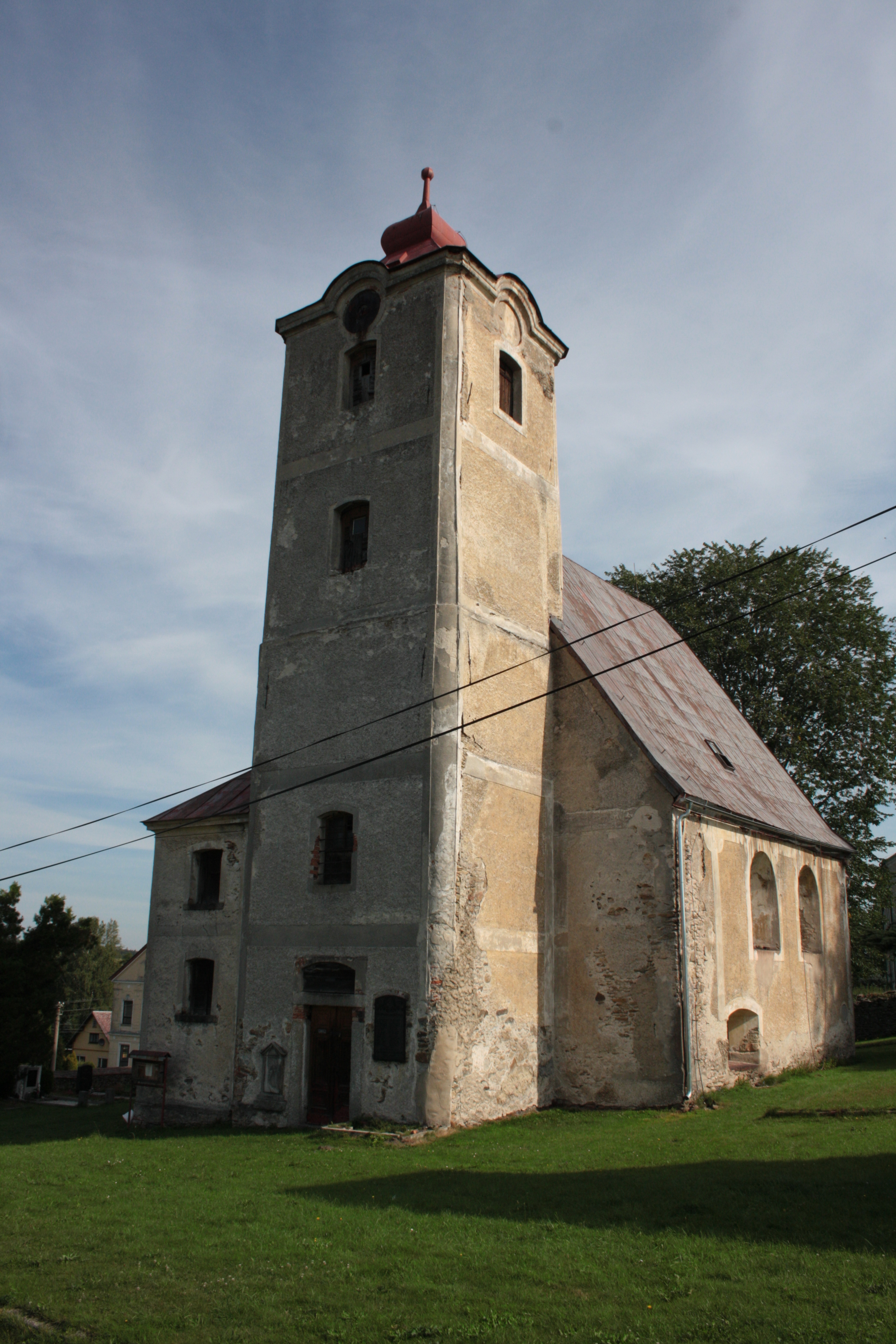
Church of the Immaculate Conception

On the Czech–Polish border is the road border crossing Srbská / Miłoszów.

== Sights ==
The main landmark of Horní Řasnice is the Church of the Immaculate Conception. It is a Gothic church from the second half of the 13th century with Baroque modifications.
