= Kościelniki Średnie =

- Village
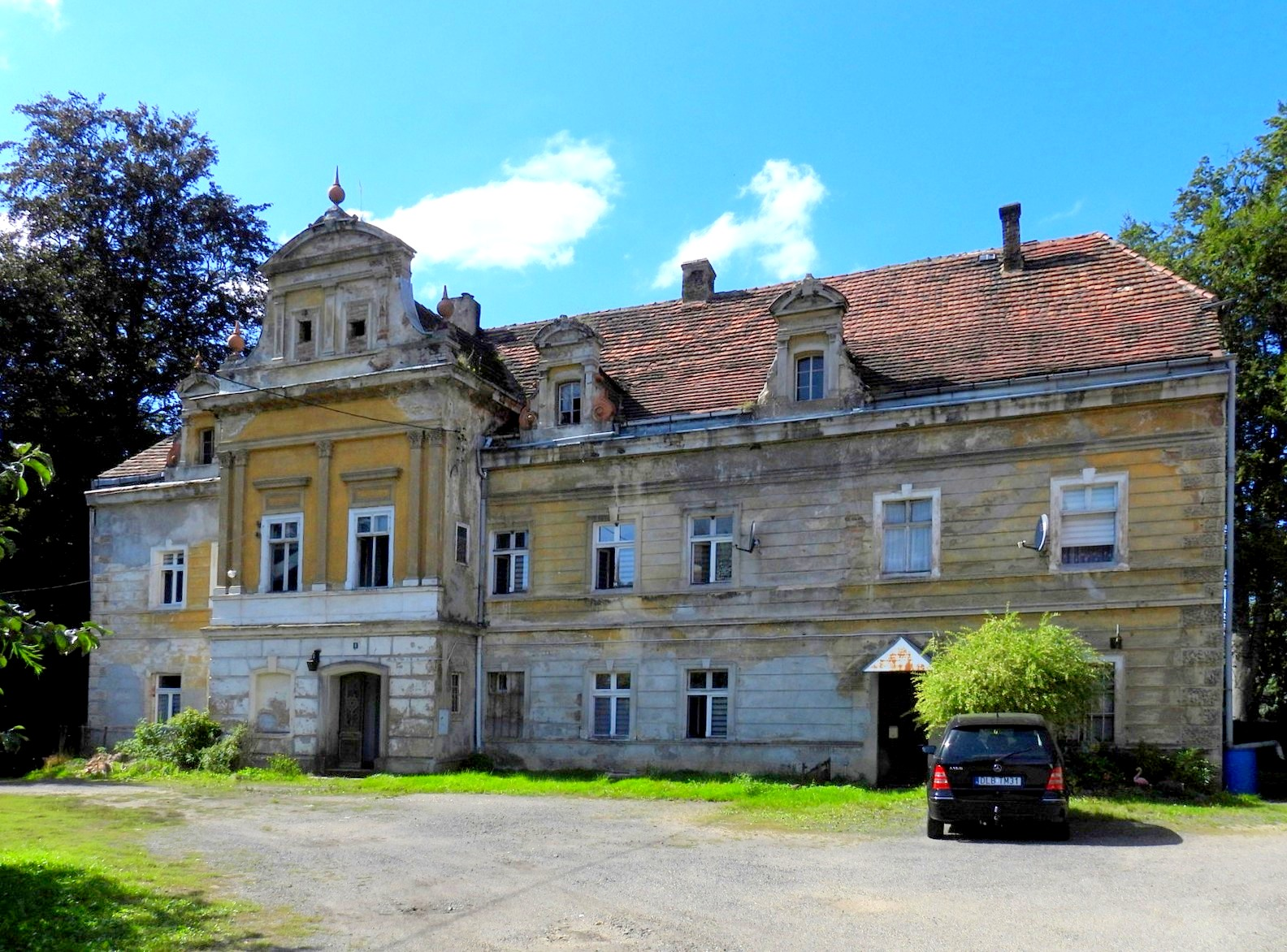
- Palace

- Location within Poland
- Coordinates: 51°03′55″N 15°17′32″E
- Country: Poland
- Voivodeship: Lower Silesian
- County: Lubań
- Gmina: Leśna

Kościelniki Średnie (German: Mittel-Steinkirch) [kɔɕt͡ɕɛlˈniki ˈɕrɛdɲɛ] is a village in the administrative district of Gmina Leśna, within Lubań County, Lower Silesian Voivodeship, in south-western Poland.
