= Złoty Potok, Lower Silesian Voivodeship =

Złoty Potok
- Village
- Location within Poland
- Coordinates: 51°0′44″N 15°22′15″E
- Country: Poland
- Voivodeship: Lower Silesian
- County: Lubań
- Gmina: Leśna

Złoty Potok [ˈzwɔtɨ ˈpɔtɔk] is a village in the administrative district of Gmina Leśna, within Lubań County, Lower Silesian Voivodeship, in south-western Poland.
