= Grabiszyce Górne =

- Village
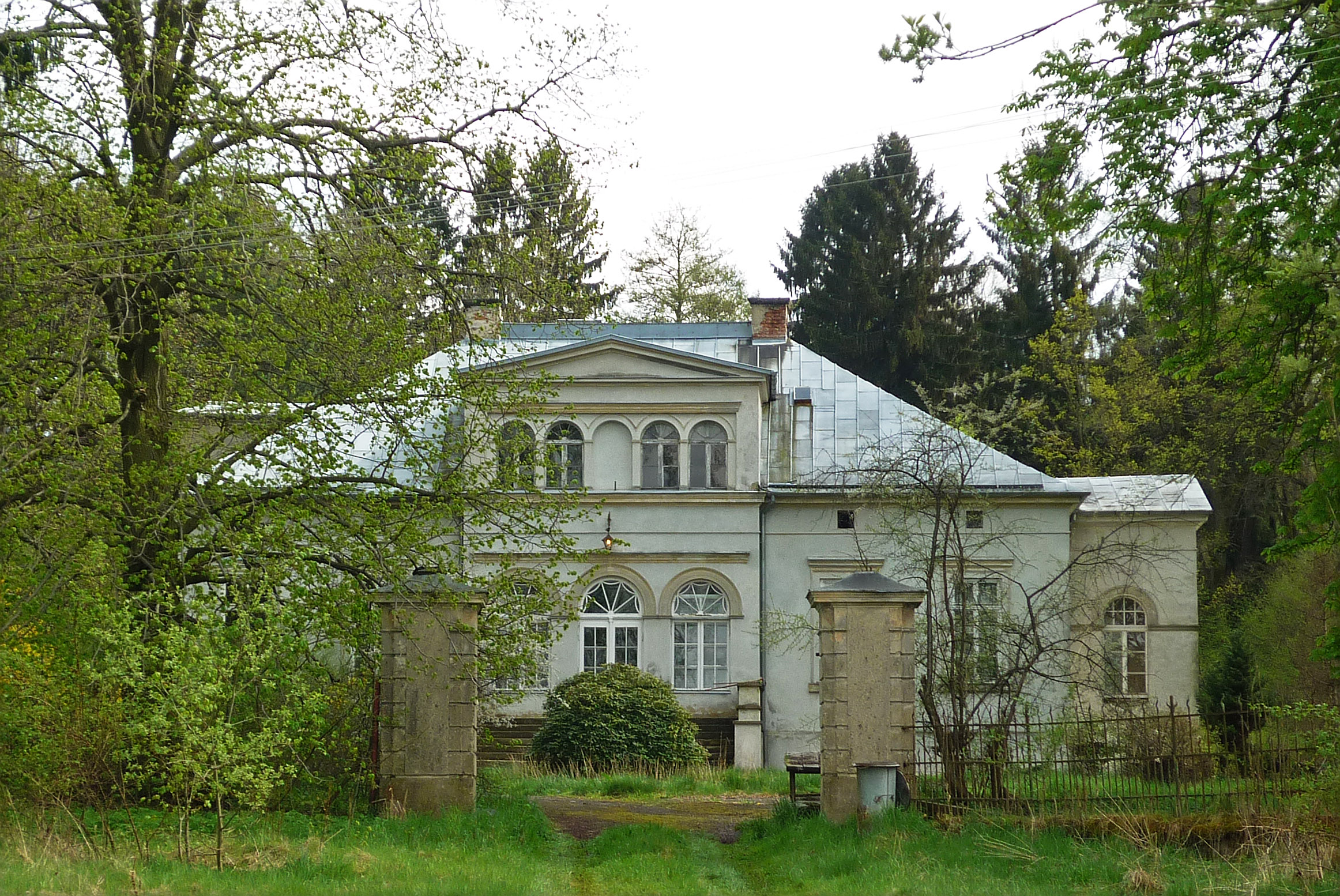
- Palace

- Location within Poland
- Coordinates: 51°00′30″N 15°11′37″E
- Country: Poland
- Voivodeship: Lower Silesian
- County: Lubań
- Gmina: Leśna

Grabiszyce Górne [ɡrabiˈʂɨt͡sɛ ˈɡurnɛ] is a village in the administrative district of Gmina Leśna, within Lubań County, Lower Silesian Voivodeship, in south-western Poland.
