= Pobiedna, Lower Silesian Voivodeship =

Pobiedna
- Village
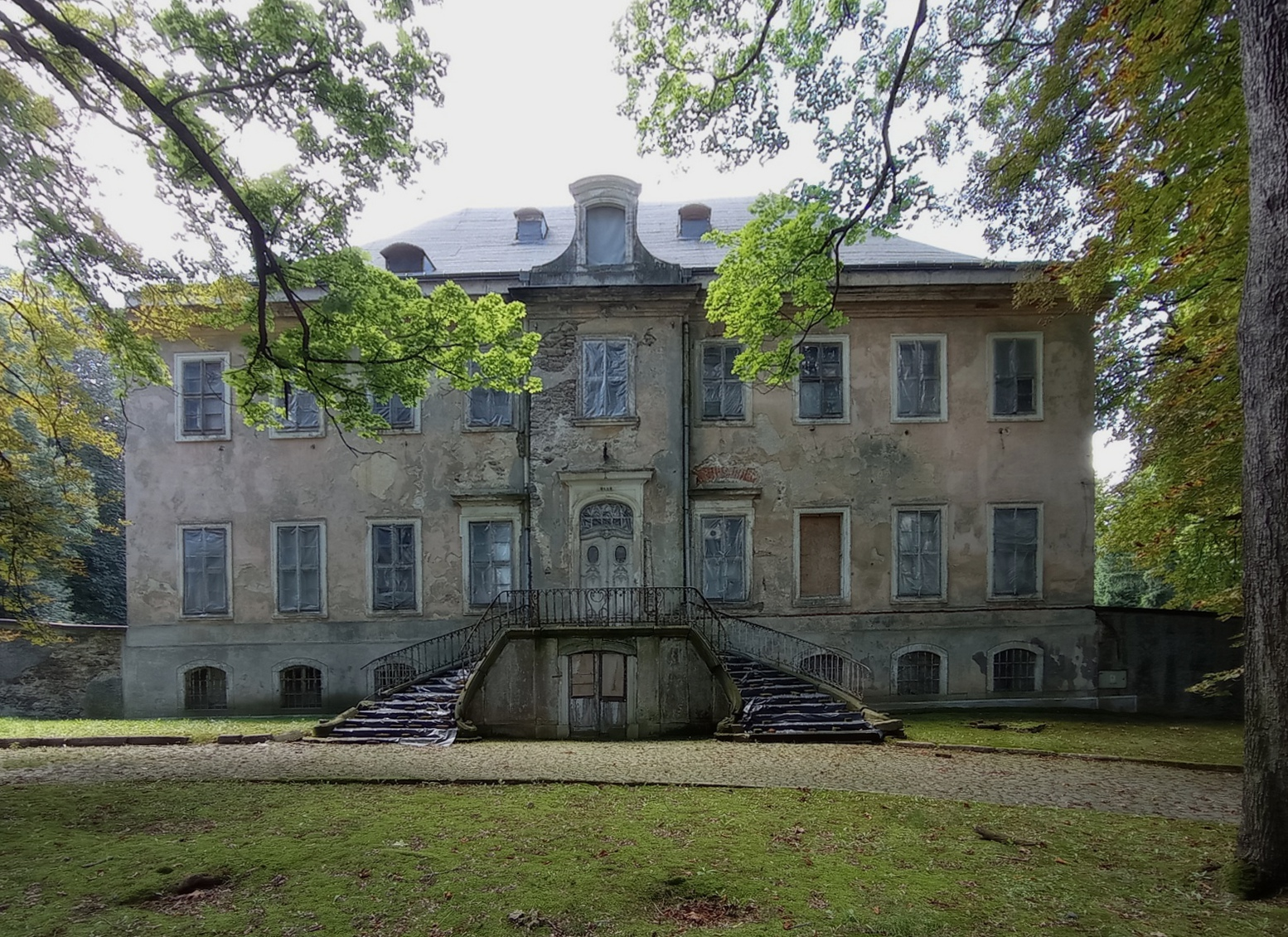
- Pobiedna Palace
- Interactive map of Pobiedna
- Location within Poland
- Coordinates: 50°56′13″N 15°17′45″E
- Country: Poland
- Voivodeship: Lower Silesian
- County: Lubań
- Gmina: Leśna
- Highest elevation: 474 m (1,555 ft)
- Lowest elevation: 401 m (1,316 ft)

Population
  - Total: 1,300
- Time zone: UTC+1 (CET)
  - Summer (DST): UTC+2 (CEST)
- Vehicle registration: DLB

Pobiedna [pɔˈbjɛdna] (German: Wigandsthal) is a village in the administrative district of Gmina Leśna, within Lubań County, Lower Silesian Voivodeship, in south-western Poland.

== Geography ==
Located at the foot of Mt. Smrk, the village is part of the historic Upper Lusatia region on the border with Lower Silesia. In the south, the crest of the Jizera Mountains marks the border with the historic region of Bohemia, part of the Czech Republic.

== History ==
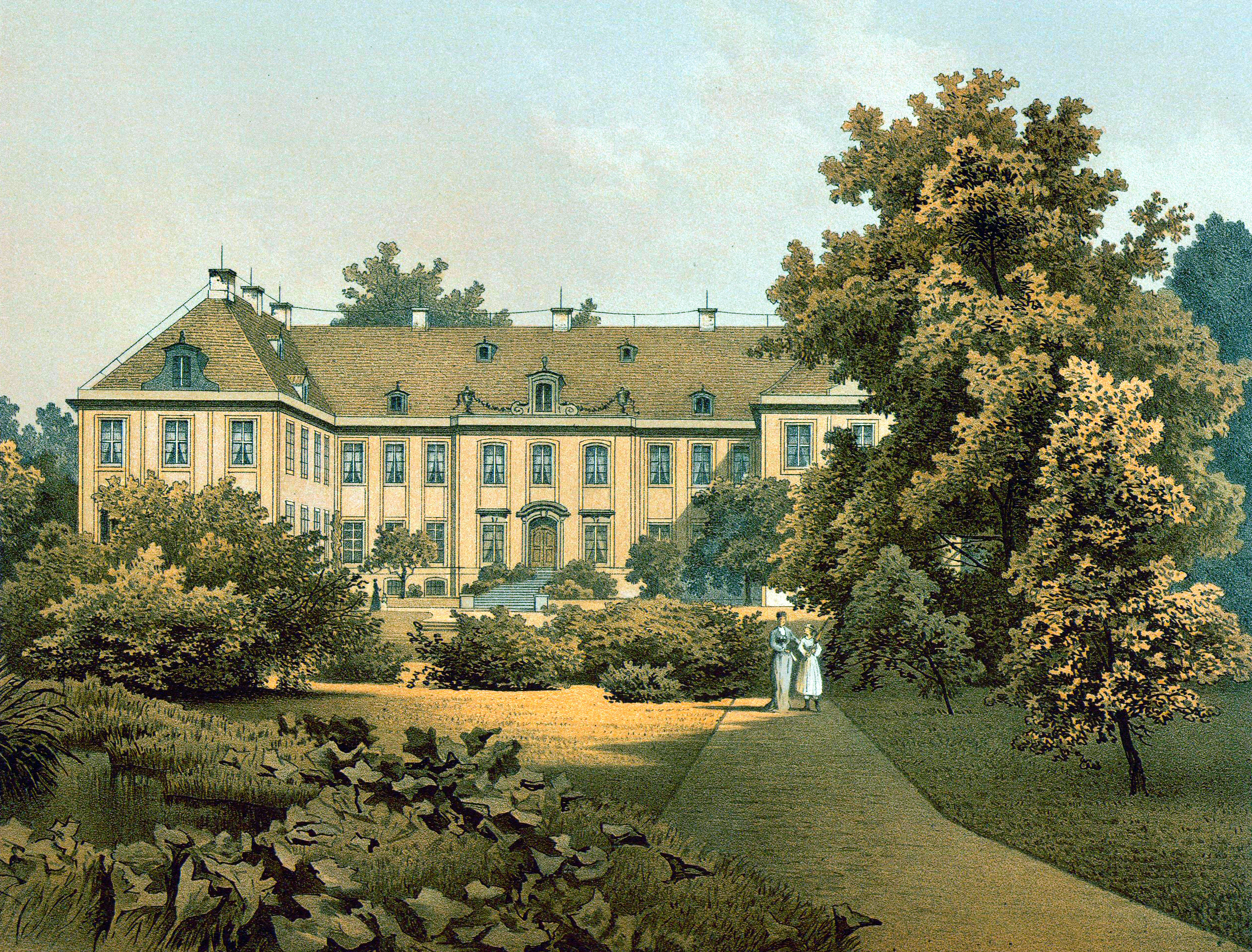
Meffersdorf Manor in the 19th century, Alexander Duncker

The older part of the village was originally named Mayfarthsdorff (Polish: Unięcice), as they were situated on a May pilgrimage route, which became corrupted to Meffersdorf. It belonged to the burgraviate of Świecie (Schwerta) Castle, a possession of King John of Bohemia since 1329. Meffersdorf was elevated to a barony in its own right in 1592, held by the Lords of Uichteritz.

After the Upper Lusatian lands had passed to Saxony by the 1635 Peace of Prague, its inhabitants, mostly Czech expellees of the Bohemian Unity of the Brethren from neighbouring Nové Město, received a town charter and mining rights by Elector John George II in 1667. It took the name Meffersdorfer Städtel, but was renamed Wigandsthal in 1688, in honour of its founder Baron Wigand von Gersdorff. From 1697, it formed part of Poland-Saxony.

Upon the annexation of northeastern Upper Lusatia by Prussia according to the Final Act of the 1815 Vienna Congress, its town charter was annulled and the region attached to the Silesia Province, and from 1871 it formed part of the German Empire. Following the implementation of the Oder–Neisse line as the Polish–German border after World War II, the village passed to the Republic of Poland, and was renamed Pobiedna in 1947.
