= Dolní Řasnice =

- Municipality
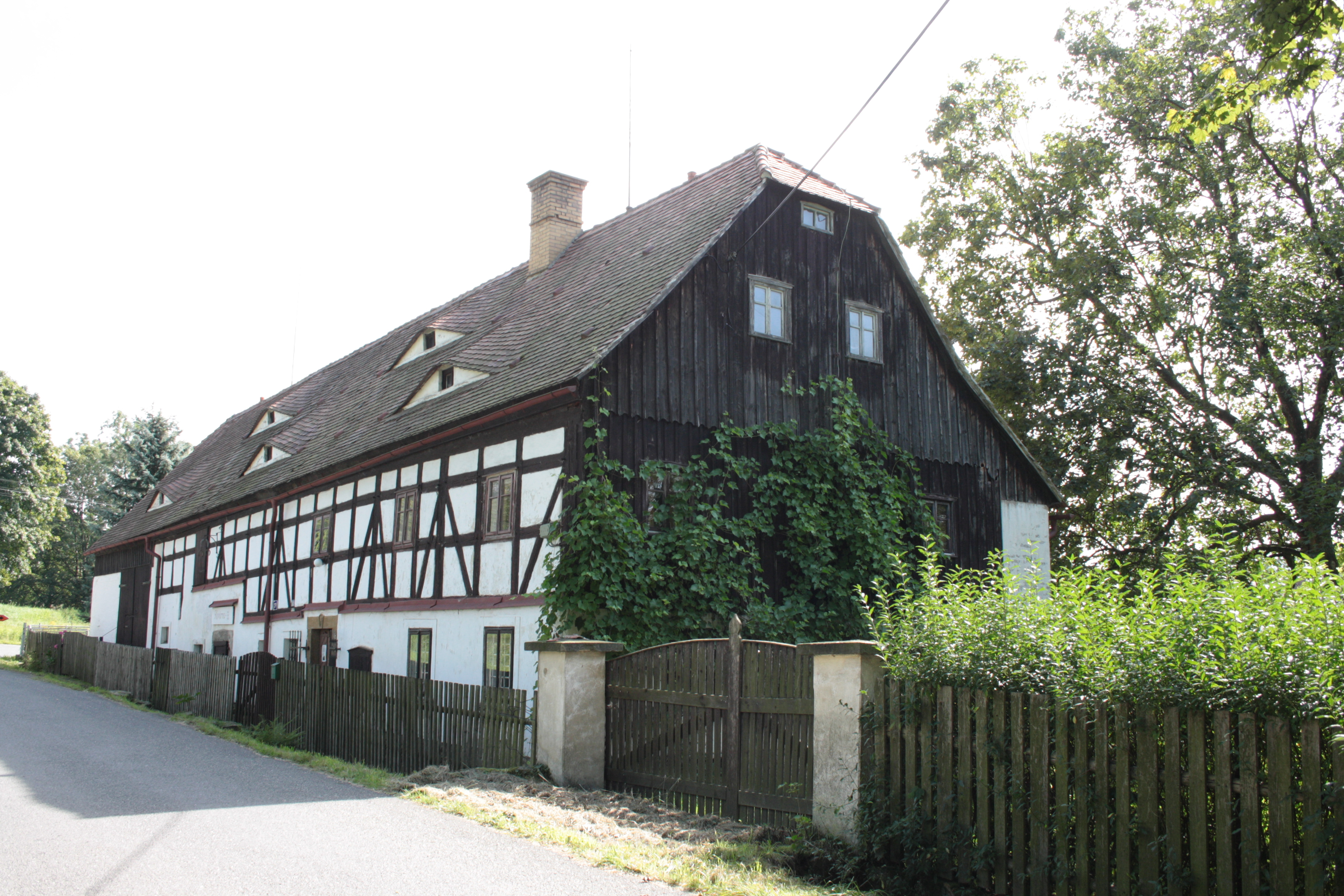
- Former smithy, part of the open-air museum

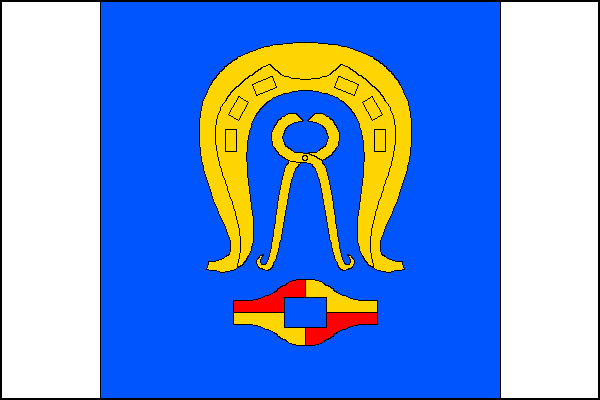
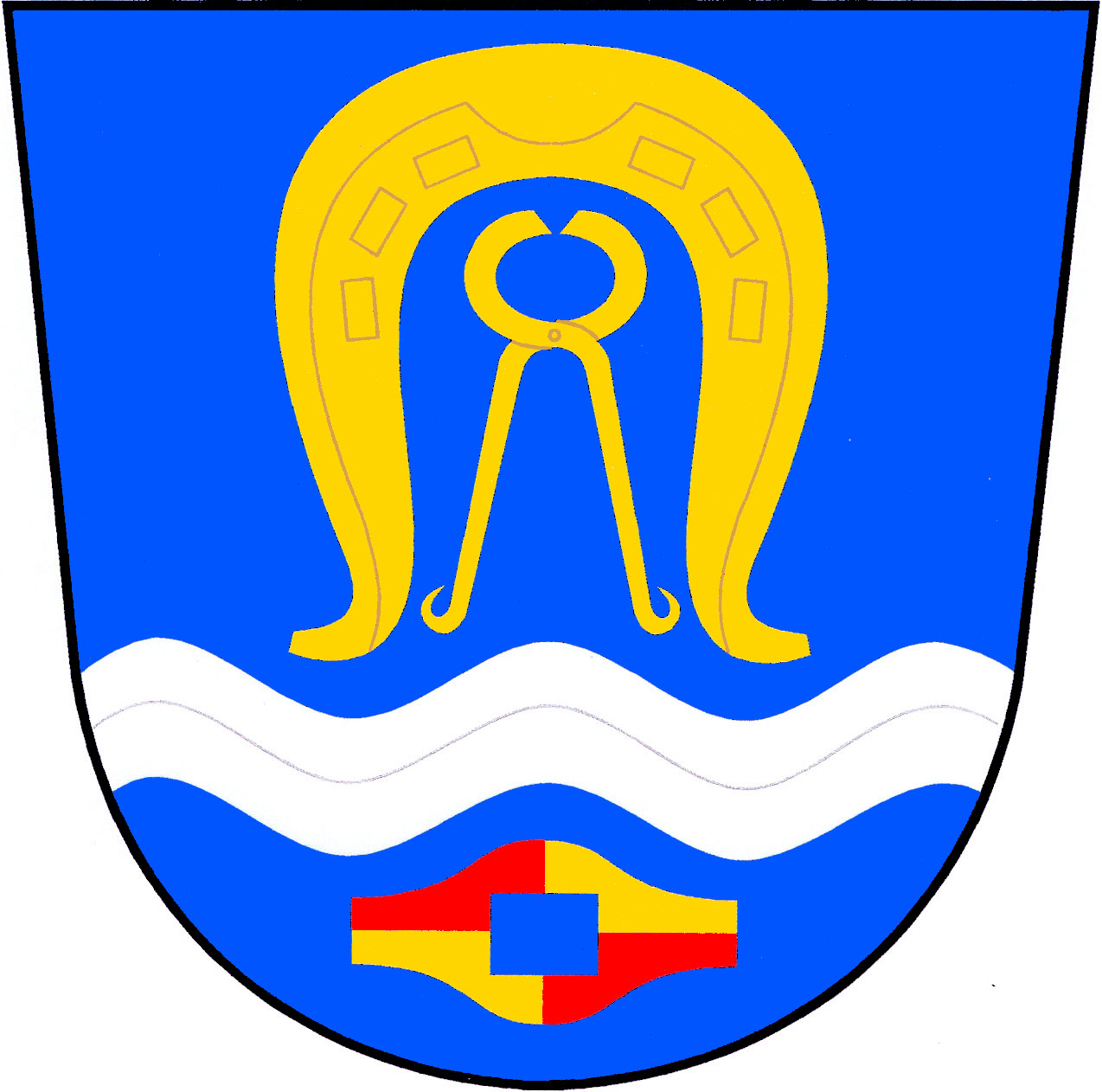
- Flag Coat of arms

- Location in the Czech Republic
- Coordinates: 50°56′45″N 15°10′8″E
- Country: Czech Republic
- Region: Liberec
- District: Liberec
- First mentioned: 1381

Area
  - Total: 12.94 km^{2} (5.00 sq mi)
- Elevation: 355 m (1,165 ft)

Population (2026-01-01)
  - Total: 574
  - Density: 44.4/km^{2} (115/sq mi)
- Time zone: UTC+1 (CET)
  - Summer (DST): UTC+2 (CEST)
- Postal code: 463 67
- Website: www.dolni-rasnice.cz

Dolní Řasnice (German: Rückersdorf) is a municipality and village in Liberec District in the Liberec Region of the Czech Republic. It has about 600 inhabitants.

== Geography ==
Dolní Řasnice is located about 20 kilometres (12 mi) northeast of Liberec, in the salient region of Frýdlant Hook, on the border with Poland. It lies in the Jizera Foothills. The highest point is the hill Humrich at 512 m (1,680 ft) above sea level. The village is situated in the valley of the Řasnice Stream.

== History ==
The first written mention of Dolní Řasnice is from 1381.

== Demographics ==
Historical population

Year	Pop.	±%
1869	1,338	—
1880	1,371	+2.5%
1890	1,432	+4.4%
1900	1,583	+10.5%
1910	1,498	−5.4%

Year	Pop.	±%
1921	1,321	−11.8%
1930	1,216	−7.9%
1950	744	−38.8%
1961	687	−7.7%
1970	583	−15.1%

Year	Pop.	±%
1980	564	−3.3%
1991	488	−13.5%
2001	495	+1.4%
2011	523	+5.7%
2021	542	+3.6%

Source: Censuses

== Transport ==
Dolní Řasnice is located on the railway line Liberec–Jindřichovice pod Smrkem. The municipality is served by two train stations: Řasnice and Řasnice zastávka.

== Sights ==
In Dolní Řasnice is a small open-air museum, presenting the folk architecture of the region, especially Upper Lusatian houses. The most valuable part of the museum and the most notable historical monument in the municipality is the former smithy of Andreas Stelzig. The house was built in the second half of the 17th century and rebuilt to the present form at the turn of the 18th and 19th centuries.
