= Leśna =

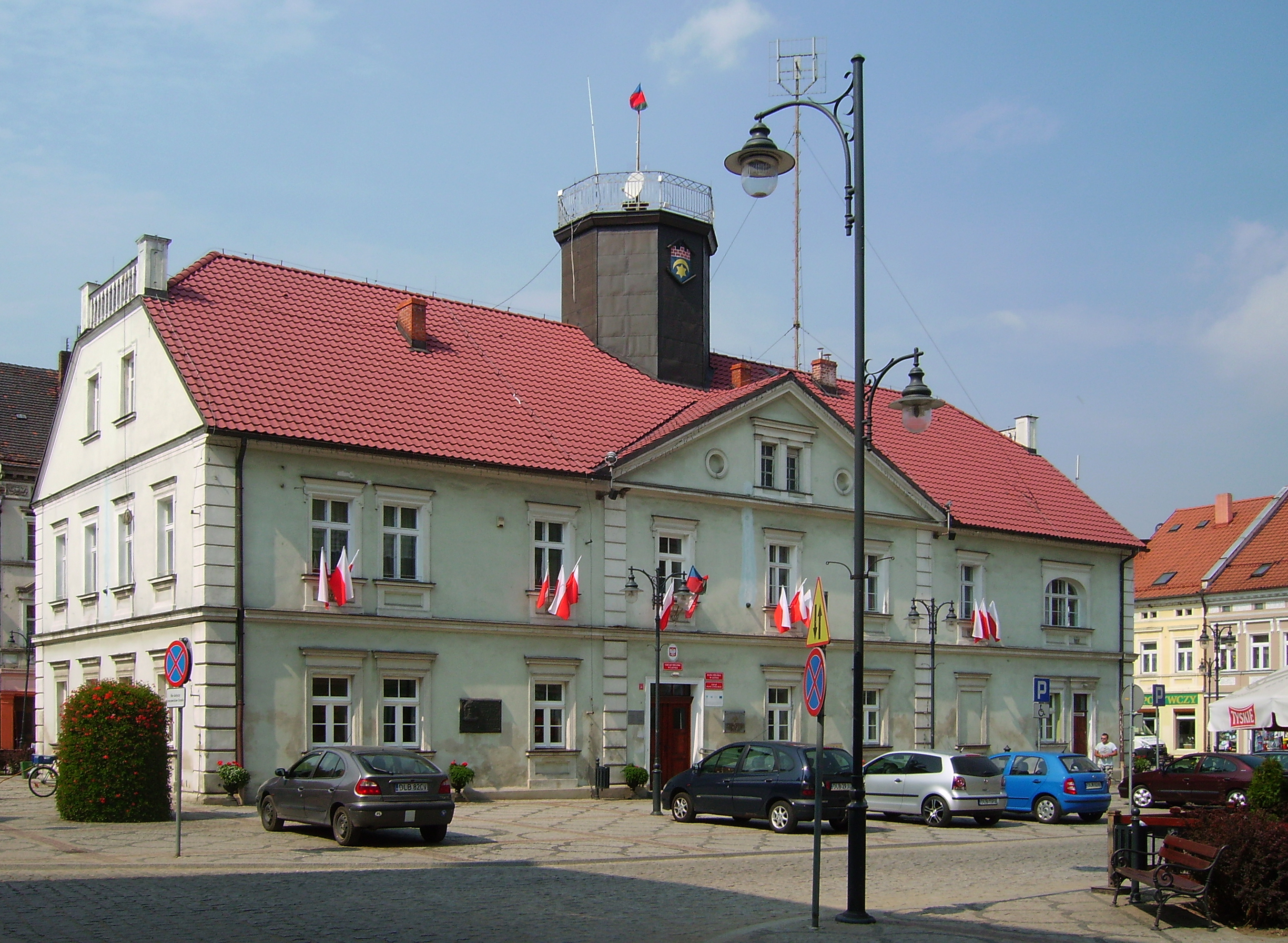
- Town hall

- Flag Coat of arms

- Location within Poland
- Coordinates: 51°01′25″N 15°16′00″E
- Country: Poland
- Voivodeship: Lower Silesian
- County: Lubań
- Gmina: Leśna

Area
  - Total: 8.56 km^{2} (3.31 sq mi)

Population (2019-06-30)
  - Total: 4,439
  - Density: 519/km^{2} (1,340/sq mi)
- Vehicle registration: DLB
- Website: lesna.pl

Leśna [ˈlɛɕna] (German: Marklissa) is a town in Lubań County, Lower Silesian Voivodeship, in south-western Poland, close to the Czech border. It is the seat of the administrative district (gmina) called Gmina Leśna. As of 2019, the town has a population of 4,439.

== Geography ==
The town is situated north of the Jizera Mountains on the left banks of the Kwisa River, the eastern edge of the historic Upper Lusatia region. In the south, a border crossing leads to Jindřichovice pod Smrkem in Bohemia.

Lake Leśnia, a reservoir of the Kwisa River, is located east of the town.

== History ==
=== Origins and medieval development ===
The earliest historical record dates back to 1247, when King Wenceslaus I of Bohemia granted the border castle of Leśna (castrum Lesne) to the Bishop of Meißen Conrad I of Wallhausen. This stronghold served as a frontier fortress for the historical region of Upper Lusatia, guarding an important river crossing while protecting the territory against the neighboring Piast duchies of Silesia.

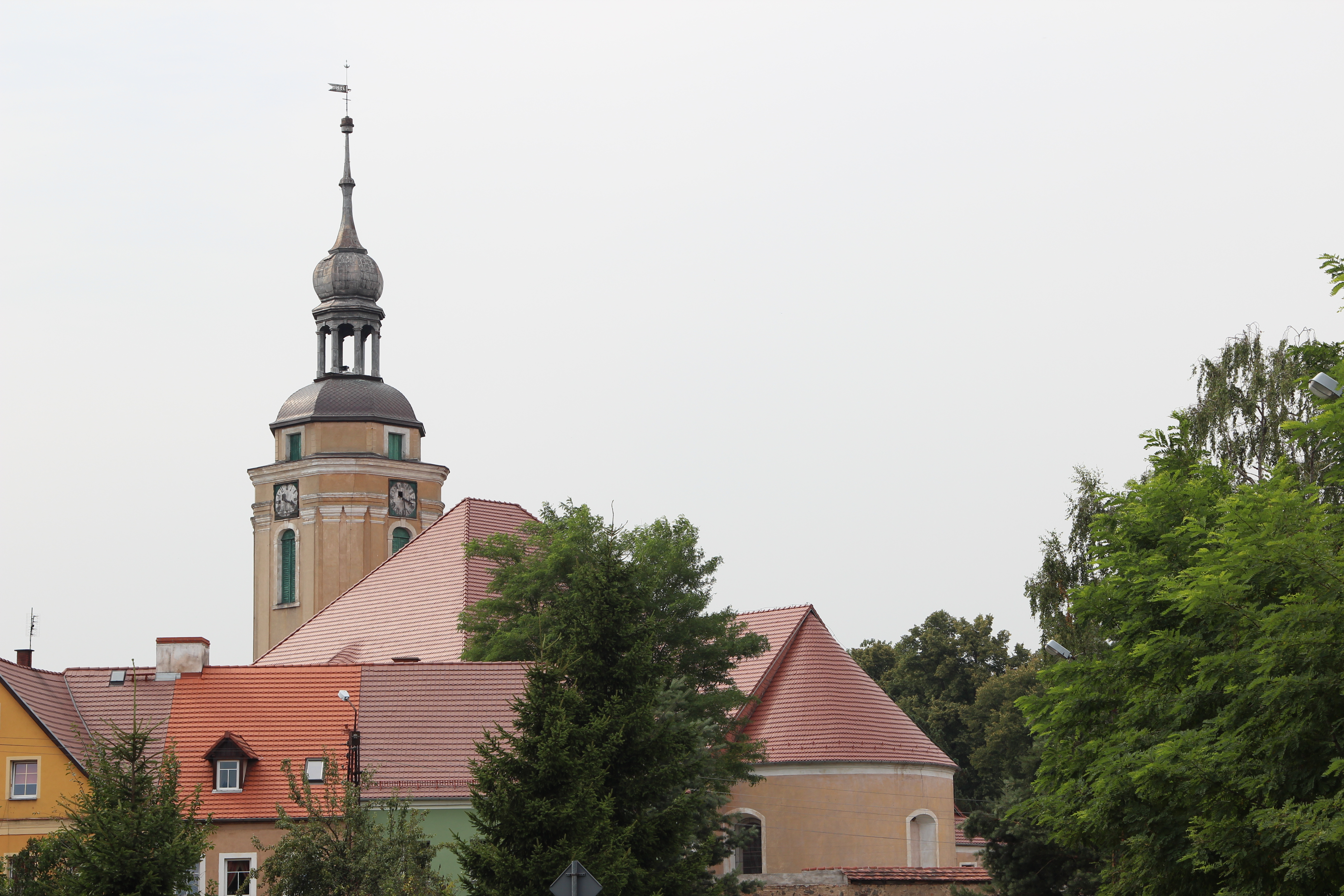
Church of Christ the King

The town itself developed independently from the castle, growing at a ford across the Kwisa (Queis) river, which marked the historic border between Upper Lusatia and Silesia. Its creation was tied to the medieval German expansion into the Upper Lusatian borderlands, where German settlers established nearby forest homestead villages between 1230 and 1260. Shortly thereafter, a trading settlement formed on the Upper Lusatian side of the river crossing.

In 1319, Duke Henry I of Jawor assumed control over the eastern part of Upper Lusatia, known as the Görlitz or Queis district. To establish an economic and market hub for his newly acquired Upper Lusatian lands, he formally founded the town under German town law between 1319 and 1329. The settlement was officially documented as a market town (oppidum forense) for the first time on May 3, 1329, in a treaty between Henry I and King John of Bohemia. Following Henry's death in 1346, the town, along with the rest of Upper Lusatia, integrated permanently into the Lands of the Bohemian Crown, soon adopting a structured system of stady self-governance complete with its own mayor, city councilors, and magistrates.

This first town layout was abandoned in 1434 upon devastations by the Hussite Wars, a flood and a fire, and rebuilt at its present location further south on the route from Frýdlant to Lubań. A centre of cloth manufacturing, it received market rights in 1515.

The name Marklissa first appeared in 1574. Upon the 1635 Peace of Prague it fell with Upper Lusatia to the Electorate of Saxony. The town's economy was boosted by the immigration of Protestants fleeing from the Counter-Reformation in the adjacent Habsburg lands of Bohemia and Silesia. After the Napoleonic Wars and the 1815 Congress of Vienna, southeastern Upper Lusatia was annexed by Prussia and incorporated into the Province of Silesia.

With Prussia Marklissa became part of the German Empire in 1871. During World War II, the Germans established and operated two forced labour subcamps of the Stalag VIII-A prisoner-of-war camp in the town. After World War II the town, located east of the Oder-Neisse line, was ceded to the Republic of Poland according to the 1945 Potsdam Agreement. The German population was expelled and the area resettled with Poles deported from the eastern Kresy borderlands.

== Twin towns – sister cities ==
See twin towns of Gmina Leśna.
