= Miłoszów =

- Village
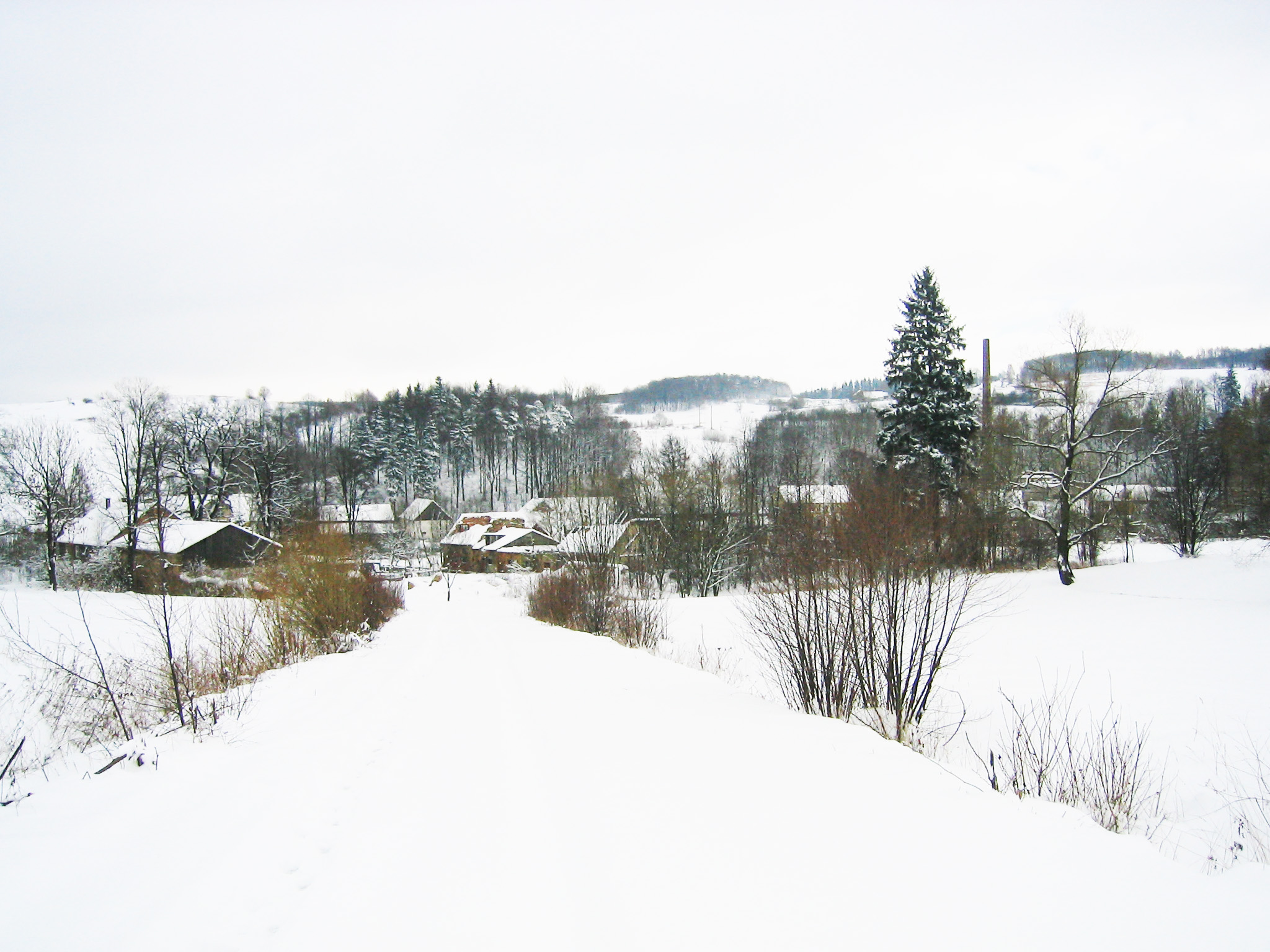
- Miłoszów in winter

- Location within Poland
- Coordinates: 51°00′16″N 15°15′00″E
- Country: Poland
- Voivodeship: Lower Silesian
- County: Lubań
- Gmina: Leśna
- Highest elevation: 325 m (1,066 ft)
- Lowest elevation: 190 m (620 ft)
- Population: 780
- Time zone: UTC+1 (CET)
  - Summer (DST): UTC+2 (CEST)
- Website: http://miloszow.pl

Miłoszów [miˈwɔʂuf] is a village in the administrative district of Gmina Leśna, within Lubań County, Lower Silesian Voivodeship, in south-western Poland, on the border with the Czech Republic.

During World War II the Germans established and operated a subcamp of the Gross-Rosen concentration camp in the village, with around 600 prisoners, mostly Poles. In February 1945, the Germans ordered the evacuation of the camp, during which at least 100 exhausted prisoners were murdered. A group of ill prisoners was left in the camp and later transported to Gross-Rosen on 19 March 1945.
