= Świecie, Lower Silesian Voivodeship =

Świecie
- Village
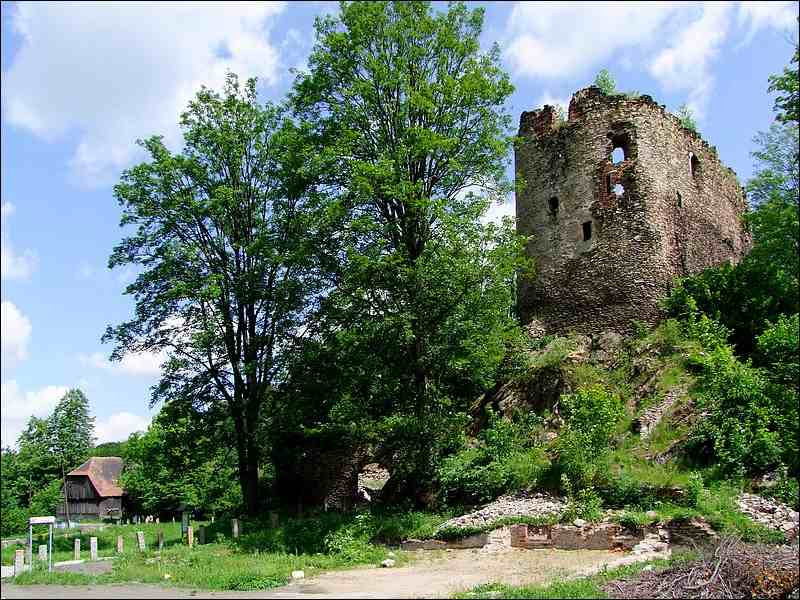
- Ruins of Świecie Castle

- Location within Poland
- Coordinates: 50°59′06″N 15°17′11″E
- Country: Poland
- Voivodeship: Lower Silesian
- County: Lubań
- Gmina: Leśna
- First mentioned: 1329

Population
  - Total: 570
- Time zone: UTC+1 (CET)
  - Summer (DST): UTC+2 (CEST)
- Vehicle registration: DLB

Świecie (Polish: [ˈɕfjɛt͡ɕɛ]) is a village in the administrative district of Gmina Leśna, within Lubań County, Lower Silesian Voivodeship, in south-western Poland, near the border with the Czech Republic.

== History ==
Świecie Castle, situated on a gneiss rock, was first mentioned in 1329. The fortress, together with the neighbouring castles at Leśna and Czocha were incorporated into the Lands of the Bohemian Crown in 1346.

According to the 1635 Peace of Prague, Świecie passed to the Electorate of Saxony, from 1697 part of Poland-Saxony. In 1719 the estates were purchased by the Royal-Polish and Electoral-Saxon field marshal Jacob Heinrich von Flemming, then in 1729 by minister Jan Kazimierz Rayski. Upon the Vienna Congress in 1815, the area was incorporated into the Prussian Province of Silesia, and from 1871 formed part of the German Empire. As of 1842, the village had a population of 1,789, and had three watermills, an oil mill, a windmill, and a brickyard.

From 1975 to 1998, Świecie was part of Jelenia Góra Voivodeship.
