= Jindřichovice pod Smrkem =

- Municipality
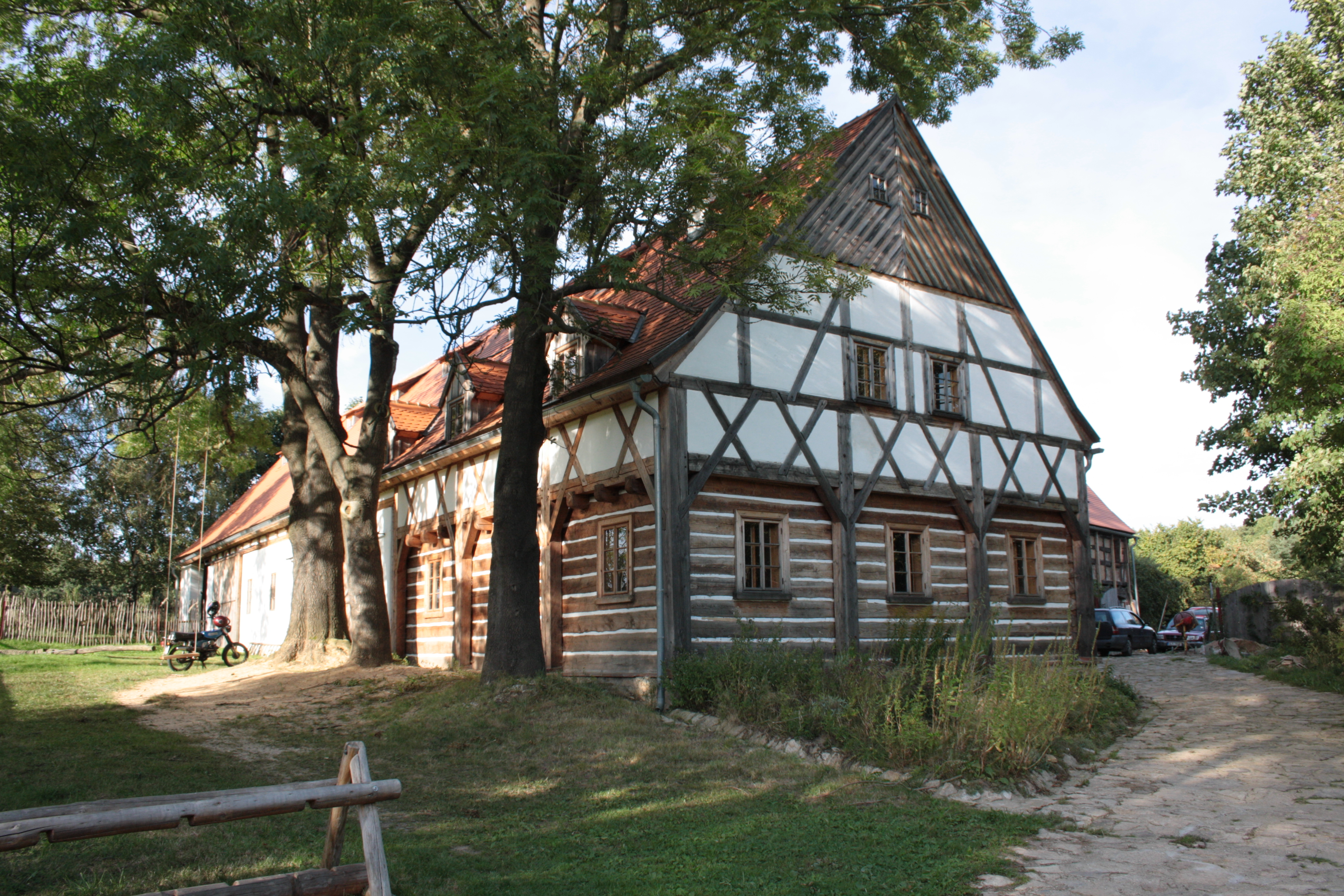
- A timber-framed house in the village

- Flag Coat of arms

- Location in the Czech Republic
- Coordinates: 50°57′39″N 15°15′00″E
- Country: Czech Republic
- Region: Liberec
- District: Liberec
- First mentioned: 1381

Area
  - Total: 19.14 km^{2} (7.39 sq mi)
- Elevation: 376 m (1,234 ft)

Population (2026-01-01)
  - Total: 619
  - Density: 32.3/km^{2} (83.8/sq mi)
- Time zone: UTC+1 (CET)
  - Summer (DST): UTC+2 (CEST)
- Postal code: 463 65
- Website: www.jindrichovice.cz

Jindřichovice pod Smrkem (German: Heinersdorf an der Tafelfichte) is a municipality and village in Liberec District in the Liberec Region of the Czech Republic. It has about 600 inhabitants.

== Administrative division ==
Jindřichovice pod Smrkem consists of two municipal parts (in brackets population according to the 2021 census):

- Jindřichovice pod Smrkem (573)
- Dětřichovec (39)

== Etymology ==
The name is derived from the personal name Jindřich and its German form Heinrich, meaning "the village of Jindřich's/Heinrich's people".

== Geography ==
Jindřichovice pod Smrkem is located about 24 kilometres (15 mi) northeast of Liberec, in the salient region of Frýdlant Hook on the border with Poland. It lies in the Jizera Foothills. The highest point is the Hřebenáč hill at 566 m (1,857 ft) above sea level. The stream Jindřichovický potok flows through the municipality.

== History ==
The first written mention of Jindřichovice pod Smrkem is from 1381.

== Demographics ==
Historical population

| Year | Pop. | ±% |
|---|---|---|
| 1869 | 2,494 | — |
| 1880 | 2,587 | +3.7% |
| 1890 | 2,722 | +5.2% |
| 1900 | 2,910 | +6.9% |
| 1910 | 2,977 | +2.3% |

| Year | Pop. | ±% |
|---|---|---|
| 1921 | 2,357 | −20.8% |
| 1930 | 2,064 | −12.4% |
| 1950 | 755 | −63.4% |
| 1961 | 913 | +20.9% |
| 1970 | 865 | −5.3% |

| Year | Pop. | ±% |
|---|---|---|
| 1980 | 740 | −14.5% |
| 1991 | 587 | −20.7% |
| 2001 | 605 | +3.1% |
| 2011 | 665 | +9.9% |
| 2021 | 612 | −8.0% |

Source: Censuses

== Transport ==
On the Czech–Polish border is the road border crossing Jindřichovice pod Smrkem / Świecie.

Jindřichovice pod Smrkem is the terminus of a railway line from Liberec.

== Sights ==
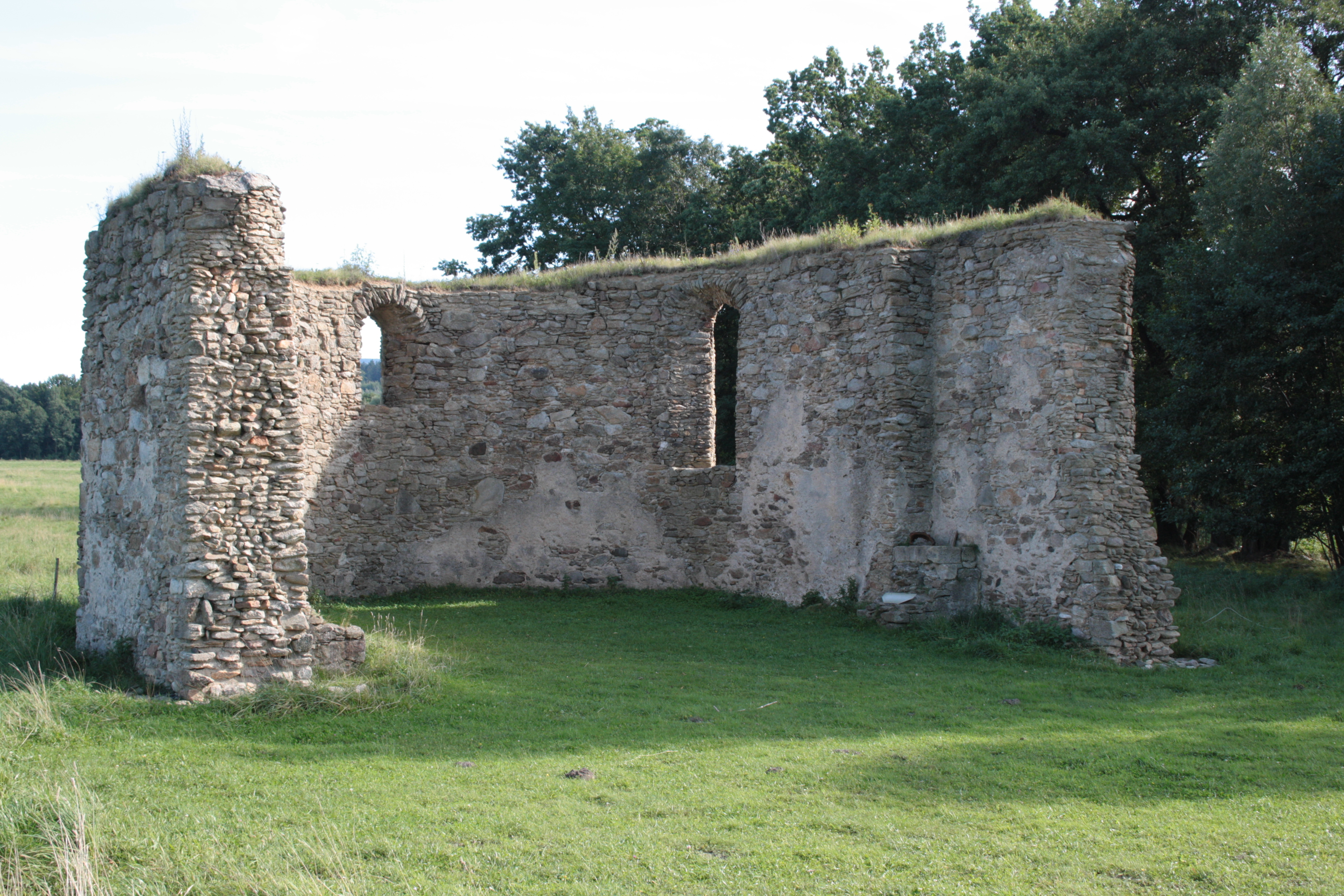
Ruin of the Church of Saint James the Great

A landmark is the ruin of the Church of Saint James the Great. It was a late Romanesque church from the second half of the 13th century.

== Twin towns – sister cities ==
Jindřichovice pod Smrkem is twinned with:

- Świeradów-Zdrój, Poland
