= Lake Leśnia =

- Jezioro Leśniańskie (Polish); Marklissa-Talsperre (German)
- Location within Lower Silesian Voivodeship
- Location: Lower Silesian Voivodeship
- Coordinates: 51.0306°N 15.3119°E
- Lake type: reservoir
- Primary inflows: Kwisa
- Primary outflows: Kwisa
- Basin countries: Poland
- Max. length: 7 km (4.3 mi)
- Max. width: 1 km (0.62 mi)
- Surface area: 1.4 km^{2} (0.54 sq mi)
- Water volume: 15,000,000 m^{3} (530,000,000 cu ft)

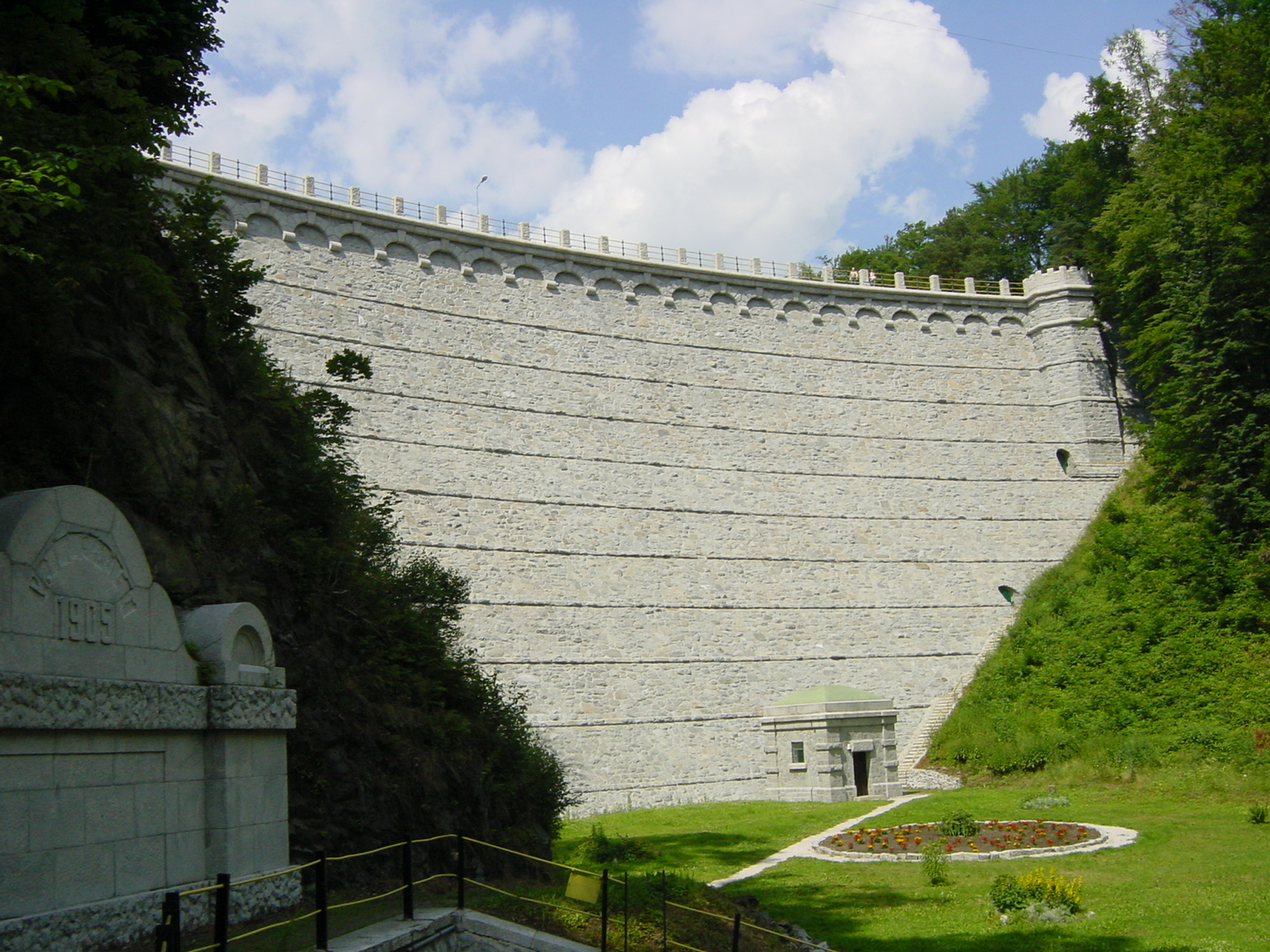
The dam

Lake Leśnia (Polish Jezioro Leśniańskie, German Marklissa-Talsperre) is a small artificial lake, located on the Kwisa river, between towns of Leśna and Gryfow Slaski in Lower Silesian Voivodeship, southwestern Poland. It was opened on July 15, 1905, after a dam had been completed near the village of Czocha. The dam was constructed between 1901 - 1905, by the government of Kingdom of Prussia’s Province of Silesia. Most workers employed during construction came from Austria and Italy, and total cost was estimated at 1,270,00 reichsmarks. The dam is 45 m high, its length is 130 m, and its thickness - 8 m on top.

Total area of the lake is 140 hectares, and volume - 15 million cubic metres. The length of the lake is around 7 km, and it is up to 1 km wide. Between 1905 and 1907, a hydroelectric power plant was built there, for 800,000 marks, funded by the government of Silesia. Currently, it is the oldest plant of this kind in Poland, with six J.M.Voith 1906 turbines still working. On the high, left bank of the lake, Czocha Castle is located, and on the right bank, there is the complex of Rajsko Castle. The lake is a popular summer vacation centre, with several campsites and watersports facilities.

== Sources ==
- History of the lake
