= Lubań County =

Coordinates: 51°07′N 15°18′E

Lubań County Powiat lubański
- County
- Flag Coat of arms

- Location within the voivodeship
- Country: Poland
- Voivodeship: Lower Silesian
- Seat: Lubań
- Gminas: Total 7 (incl. 2 urban): Lubań; Świeradów-Zdrój; Gmina Leśna; Gmina Lubań; Gmina Olszyna; Gmina Platerówka; Gmina Siekierczyn

Area
  - Total: 428.19 km^{2} (165.33 sq mi)

Population (2019-06-30)
  - Total: 54,493
  - Density: 127.26/km^{2} (329.61/sq mi)
  - Urban: 34,021
  - Rural: 20,472
- Car plates: DLB
- Website: www.powiatluban.home.pl

Lubań County (Polish: powiat lubański) is a unit of territorial administration and local government (powiat) in Lower Silesian Voivodeship, south-western Poland. It came into being on January 1, 1999, as a result of the Polish local government reforms passed in 1998. The county covers an area of 428.2 square kilometres (165.3 sq mi). Its administrative seat and largest town is Lubań. The county also contains the towns of Olszyna, Leśna and Świeradów-Zdrój.

As at 2006 the total population of the county is 54,493, out of which the population of Lubań is 21,087, that of Leśna is 4,439, that of Olszyna is 4,348, that of Świeradów-Zdrój is 4,147, and the rural population is 20,472.

== Neighbouring counties ==
Lubań County is bordered by Zgorzelec County to the west, Bolesławiec County to the north-east and Lwówek County to the east. It also borders the Czech Republic to the south.

== Administrative divisions ==
The county is subdivided into seven gminas (two urban, two urban-rural and three rural). These are listed in the following table, in descending order of population.

Gmina	Type	Area (km^{2})	Population (2019)	Seat
Lubań	urban	16.1	21,087	
Gmina Leśna	urban-rural	104.5	10,013	Leśna
Gmina Lubań	rural	142.2	6,601	Lubań*
Gmina Olszyna	urban-rural	47.2	6,504	Olszyna
Gmina Siekierczyn	rural	49.6	4,510	Siekierczyn
Świeradów-Zdrój	urban	20.7	4,147	
Gmina Platerówka	rural	47.9	1,631	Platerówka
* seat not part of the gmina
