= Biedrzychowice =

Biedrzychowice may refer to the following places in Poland:

- Biedrzychowice, Lower Silesian Voivodeship (south-west Poland)
- Biedrzychowice, Opole Voivodeship (south-west Poland)
