= Bożkowice =

- Village
- Location within Poland
- Coordinates: 51°02′16″N 15°18′44″E
- Country: Poland
- Voivodeship: Lower Silesian
- County: Lubań
- Gmina: Olszyna

Bożkowice [bɔʂkɔˈvit͡sɛ] is a village in the administrative district of Gmina Olszyna, within Lubań County, Lower Silesian Voivodeship, in south-western Poland.
