= Zapusta =

Zapusta may refer to the following places in Poland:

- Zapusta, Lower Silesian Voivodeship (south-west Poland)
- Zapusta, Masovian Voivodeship (east-central Poland)
