= Kałużna =

Kałużna may refer to the following places in Poland:

- Kałużna, Lower Silesian Voivodeship (south-west Poland)
- Kałużna, West Pomeranian Voivodeship (north-west Poland)

== See also ==
- Kalyuzhny
