= Grodnica, Lower Silesian Voivodeship =

Grodnica
- Village
- Location within Poland
- Coordinates: 51°03′13″N 15°19′24″E
- Country: Poland
- Voivodeship: Lower Silesian
- County: Lubań
- Gmina: Olszyna

Grodnica [ɡrɔdˈnit͡sa] is a village in the administrative district of Gmina Olszyna, within Lubań County, Lower Silesian Voivodeship, in southwestern Poland.
