= Karłowice, Lower Silesian Voivodeship =

Karłowice
- Village
- Location within Poland
- Coordinates: 51°01′50″N 15°22′58″E
- Country: Poland
- Voivodeship: Lower Silesian
- County: Lubań
- Gmina: Olszyna

Karłowice [karwɔˈvit͡sɛ] is a village in the administrative district of Gmina Olszyna, within Lubań County, Lower Silesian Voivodeship, in south-western Poland.
