= Armorial of Poland =

This is a list of coats of arms of Poland.

== Historical coats of arms ==
Coat of arms of Poland (1295-1370)

Coat of arms of Poland (1295–1569)

Coat of arms of Poland in personal union with Hungary (1370-1384)

Coat of arms of Poland (1386-1569)

Coat of arms of Poland (1569–1795)

Coat of arms of Duchy of Warsaw (1807-1815)

Coat of arms of Congress Poland (1815-1917)

Coat of arms of the November Uprising (1830-1831)

Coat of arms of the Kraków uprising (1846)

Coat of arms of the January Uprising (1863-1865)

=== Restored Poland ===
Coat of arms of Poland (1916–1918)

Coat of arms of Poland (1919–1927)

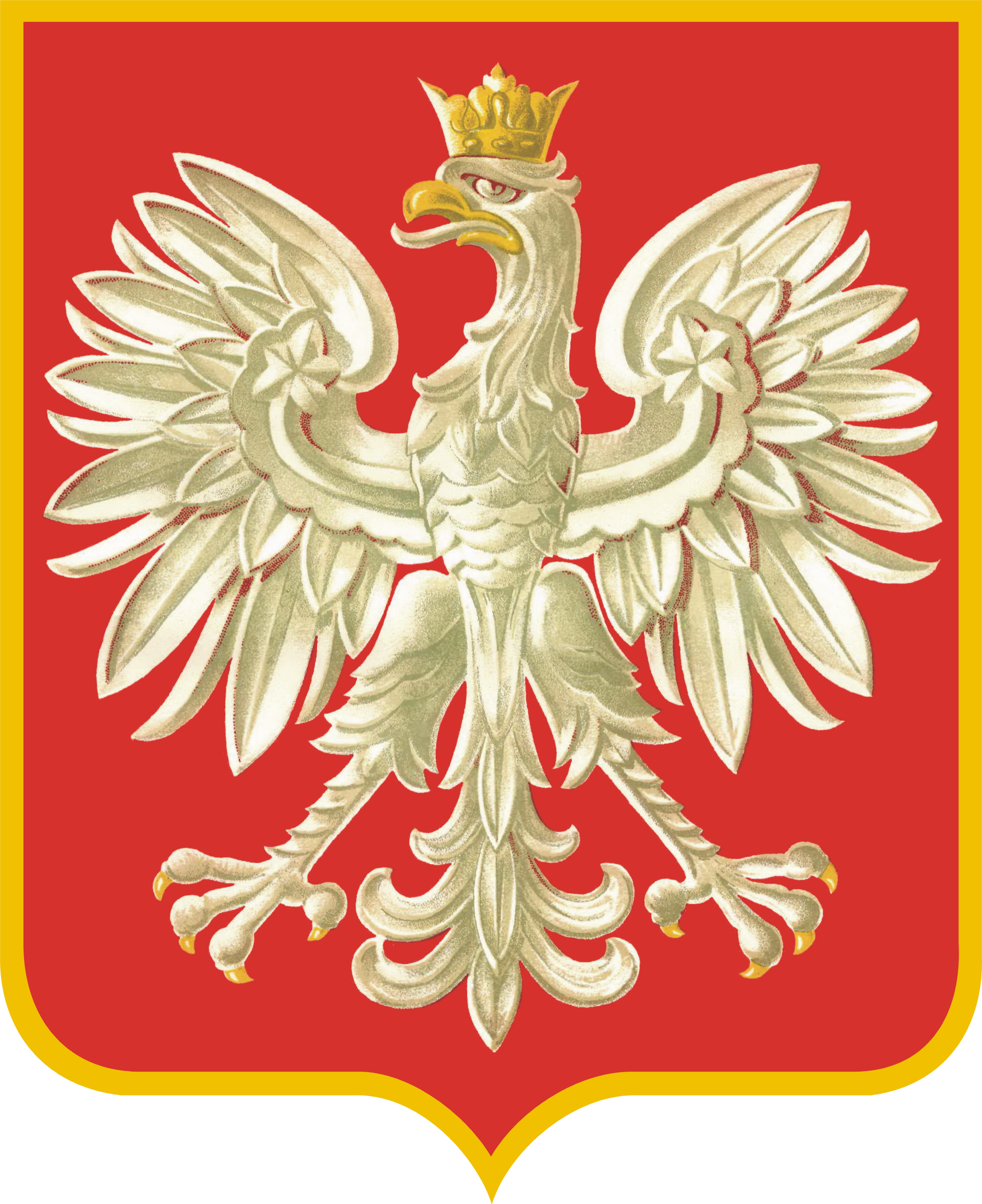
Coat of arms of Poland (1927–1939) and of the Polish government-in-exile until 1956

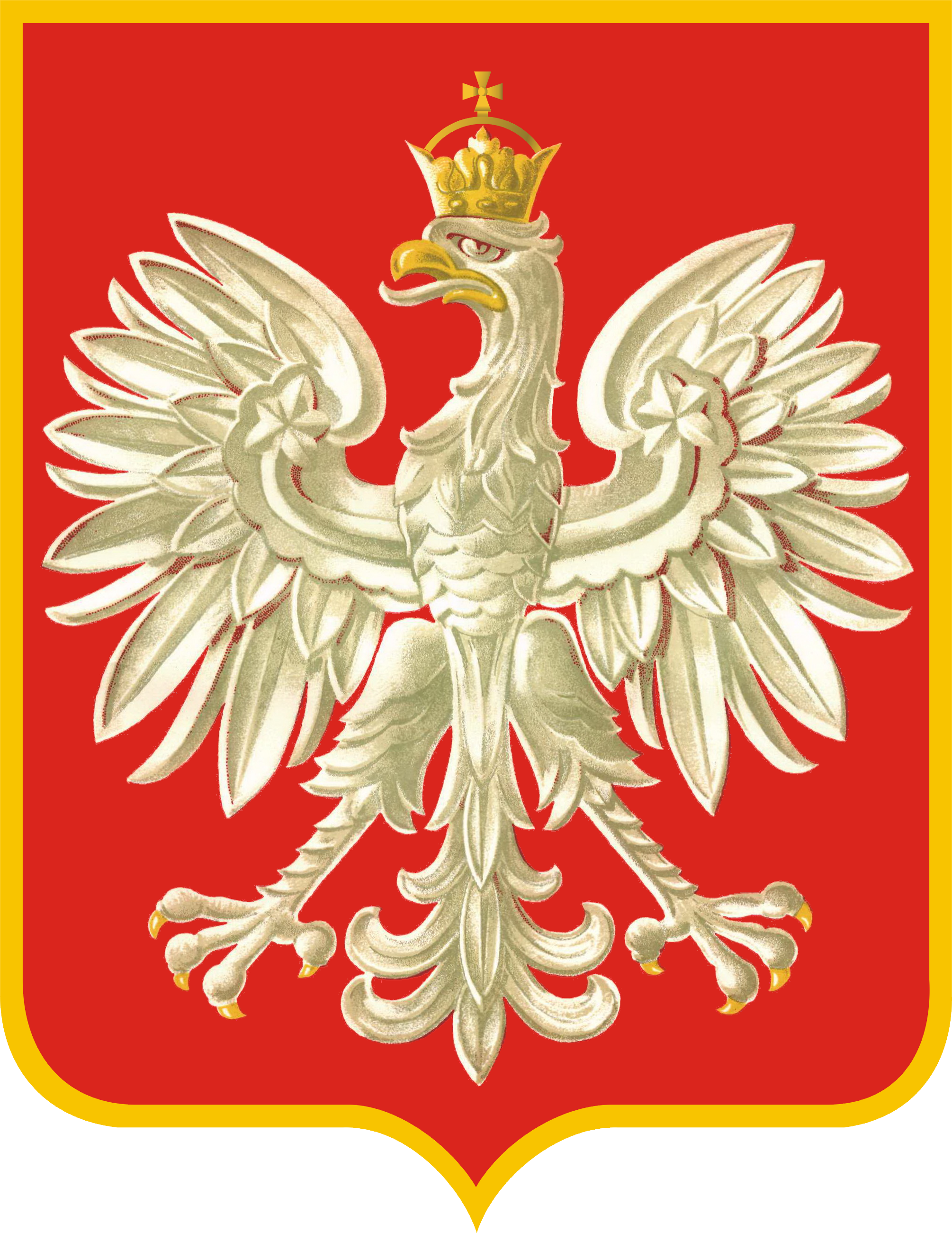
Coat of arms of the Polish government-in-exile (1956–1990)

Coat of arms of the Polish People's Republic (1955–1990)

Coat of arms of the Republic of Poland (since 1990)

=== Coats of Arms of Governorates of Russian Empire in the Congress of Poland ===
Siedlce Governorate

Suwalki Governorate

Piotrków Governorate

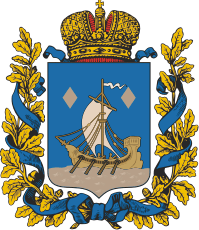
Łomża Governorate

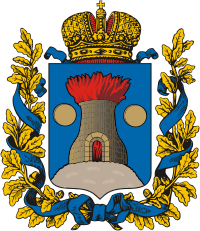
Kielce Governorate

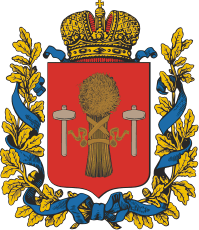
Radom Governorate

Płock Governorate

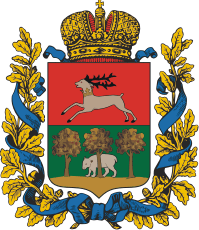
Lublin Governorate

Kalisz Governorate

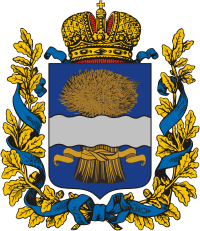
Warsaw Governorate

=== In the lands of the Prussian Partition ===
Grand Duchy of Posen

=== In the lands of the Austrian Partition ===
Kingdom of Galicia and Lodomeria

== Voivodeships of Poland ==
This is a list of coats of arms of the voivodeships (first-level subdivisions) of Poland.

Image	Main article	Voivodeship	Blazon
Greater Poland Voivodeship	Coat of arms of the Greater Poland Voivodeship	Greater Poland Voivodeship	Gules an eagle Argent beaked, langued and membered Or, with cloverstalks and tailed with a collar of the same
Kuyavian-Pomeranian Voivodeship	Coat of arms of the Kuyavian-Pomeranian Voivodeship	Kuyavian-Pomeranian Voivodeship	Argent a demi-eagle couped palewise Gules beaked and armed Or, and addorsed a demi-lion couped palewise Sable langued and armed of the second, both crowned with a coronet of the third
Lesser Poland Voivodeship	Coat of arms of the Lesser Poland Voivodeship	Lesser Poland Voivodeship	Gules an eagle Argent crowned, beaked, langued and membered Or, with cloverstalks of the same
Łódź Voivodeship	Coat of arms of the Łódź Voivodeship	Łódź Voivodeship	Tierced palewise, first Or in chief a demi-lion couped palewise Gules, second Gules in chief two demi-eagles couped palewise confrontant Argent and Sable, and in base an uncrowned eagle Sable with the majuscule R Or on its chest, third Or a demi-lion couped palewise Gules; both hybrids crowned Or
Lower Silesian Voivodeship	Coat of arms of the Lower Silesian Voivodeship	Lower Silesian Voivodeship	Or an eagle Sable, on its chest and wings a crescent Argent, issuant therefrom a crosslet of the same
Lublin Voivodeship	Coat of arms of the Lublin Voivodeship	Lublin Voivodeship	Gules a stag springing Argent gorged with a coronet Or
Lubusz Voivodeship	Coat of arms of the Lubusz Voivodeship	Lubusz Voivodeship	Per pale, first Gules a demi-eagle Argent crowned, beaked and membered Or, with a cloverstalk and tailed with a collar of the same, second Vert two six-pointed mullets Or in pale
Masovian Voivodeship	Coat of arms of the Masovian Voivodeship	Masovian Voivodeship	Gules an eagle Argent beaked, langued and membered Or
Opole Voivodeship	Coat of arms of the Opole Voivodeship	Opole Voivodeship	Azure an eagle crowned Or
Podlaskie Voivodeship	Coat of arms of the Podlaskie Voivodeship	Podlaskie Voivodeship	Gules party per fess, first an eagle Argent beaked, langued and membered Or, second a knight in armor and helmet Argent, with spurs Or, brandishing in his dexter hand a sword Argent hilted Or and holding in his sinister hand an escutcheon of Azure a patriarchal cross Or, on a horse Argent saddled Azure and bridled Or
Pomeranian Voivodeship	Coat of arms of the Pomeranian Voivodeship	Pomeranian Voivodeship	Or a griffin Sable langued Gules
Silesian Voivodeship	Coat of arms of the Silesian Voivodeship	Silesian Voivodeship	Azure an eagle Or
Subcarpathian Voivodeship	Coat of arms of the Subcarpathian Voivodeship	Subcarpathian Voivodeship	Per pale, first Gules a griffin segreant Agrent crowned, beaked, langued and armed Or, second Azure a lion rampant crowned Or, langued Gules, over all in chief a cross pattée Argent
Świętokrzyskie Voivodeship	Coat of arms of the Świętokrzyskie Voivodeship	Świętokrzyskie Voivodeship	Quarterly, first Azure a patriarchal cross Or, second Gules an eagle Argent beaked and membered Or, third barry of eight Gules and Argent, fourth Azure nine six-pointed mullets Or in three rows of three each
Warmian-Masurian Voivodeship	Coat of arms of the Warmian-Masurian Voivodeship	Warmian-Masurian Voivodeship	Gules per fess, the base per pale, first an eagle Argent crowned, beaked, langued and membered Or, with cloverstalks of the same; second the Holy Lamb Argent nimbed Or with a cross Gules, holding a cross-staff Or with a banner of Argent a cross Gules, bleeding Gules into a chalice Or; third an eagle Sable beaked, membered and with clovestalks Or, gorged with a coronet of the same, on its chest the majuscule S also of the same
West Pomeranian Voivodeship	Coat of arms of the West Pomeranian Voivodeship	West Pomeranian Voivodeship	Argent a griffin Gules beaked and armed Or

=== Projects 1919–1939 ===
Białystok Voivodeship

Kielce Voivodeship

Krakow Voivodeship

Lublin Voivodeship

Lwow Voivodeship

Lodz Voivodeship

Nowogródek Voivodeship

Poleskie Voivodeship

Pomorskie Voivodeship

Poznań Voivodeship

Stanisławów Voivodeship

Silesian Voivodeship

Tarnopol Voivodeship

Warszawa Voivodeship

Wilno Voivodeship

Wołyń Voivodeship

== Military Eagle ==
Polish Land Forces

Polish Air Force

Polish Navy

Polish Special Forces

Territorial Defence Force

== Voivodeship ==
=== Greater Poland Voivodeship ===
Poznań

Bojanowo

Borek Wielkopolski

Brdów

Buk

Chodzież

Czarnków

Czempiń

Czerniejewo

Dąbie

Dobra

Dobrzyca

Dolsk

Gniezno

Golina

Gołańcz

Gostyń

Grodzisk Wielkopolski

Grabów nad Prosną

Jarocin

Jastrowie

Jutrosin

Kalisz

Kępno

Kleczew

Kłecko

Kłodawa

Kobylin

Koło

Konin

Kostrzyn

Kościan

Koźmin Wielkopolski

Kórnik

Krajenka

Krobia

Krotoszyn

Krzywiń

Krzyż Wielkopolski

Książ Wielkopolski

Leszno

Luboń

Lwówek

Łobżenica

Margonin

Miejska Górka

Międzychód

Mikstat

Miłosław

Mosina

Murowana Goślina

Nekla

Nowe Skalmierzyce

Nowy Tomyśl

Oborniki

Obrzycko

Odolanów

Okonek

Opalenica

Osieczna

Ostroróg

Ostrów Wielkopolski

Ostrzeszów

Piła

Pleszew

Pniewy

Pobiedziska

Pogorzela

Poniec

Przedecz

Puszczykowo

Pyzdry

Rakoniewice

Raszków

Rawicz

Rogoźno

Rozdrażew

Rychwał

Rydzyna

Sieraków

Skoki

Słupca

Sompolno

Stawiszyn

Stęszew

Sulmierzyce

Swarzędz

Szamocin

Szamotuły

Ślesin

Śmigiel

Śrem

Środa Wielkopolska

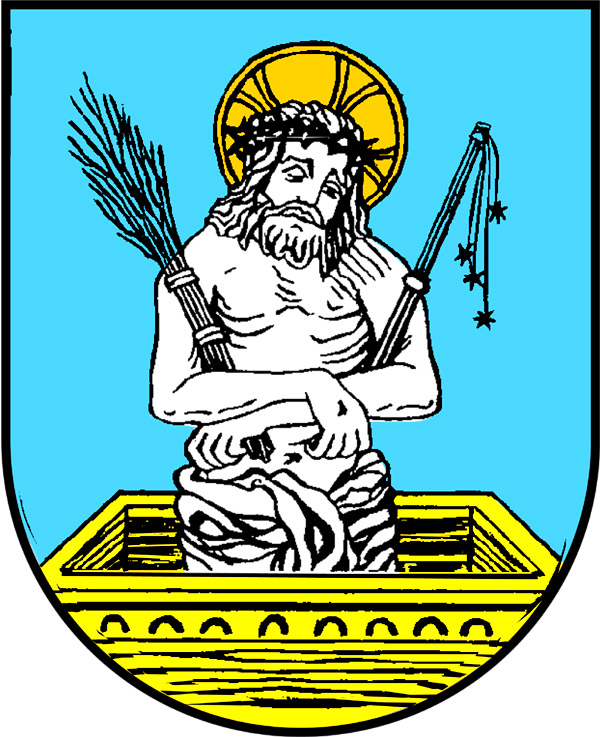
Święciechowa

Trzcianka

Trzemeszno

Tuliszków

Turek

Ujście

Wągrowiec

Witkowo

Wieleń

Wielichowo

Wolsztyn

Września

Wronki

Wyrzysk

Wysoka

Zagórów

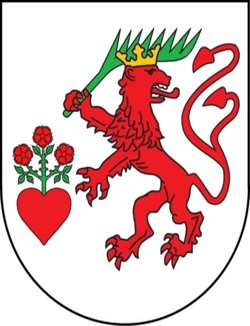
Zaniemyśl

Zbąszyń

Zduny

Złotów

Żerków

Chodzież County

Czarnków-Trzcianka County

Jarocin County

Kalisz County

Kępno County

Koło County

Krotoszyn County

Kościan County

Gniezno County

Gostyń County

Grodzisk County

Konin County

Leszno County

Międzychód County

Nowy Tomyśl County

Oborniki County

Ostrów County

Ostrzeszów County

Piła County

Pleszew County

Poznań County

Rawicz County

Słupca County

Szamotuły County

Śrem County

Środa County

Turek County

Wągrowiec County

Wolsztyn County

Września County

Złotów County

=== Kuyavian-Pomeranian Voivodeship ===
Bydgoszcz

Toruń

Aleksandrów Kujawski

Barcin

Brodnica

Brześć Kujawski

Chełmno

Chełmża

Chodecz

Ciechocinek

Dobrzyń nad Wisłą

Gniewkowo

Golub-Dobrzyń

Górzno

Grudziądz

Inowrocław

Izbica Kujawska

Jabłonowo Pomorskie

Janikowo

Janowiec Wielkopolski

Kamień Krajeński

Kcynia

Koronowo

Kowal

Kowalewo Pomorskie

Kruszwica

Lipno

Lubień Kujawski

Lubraniec

Łabiszyn

Łasin

Mogilno

Mrocza

Nakło nad Notecią

Nieszawa

Nowe

Pakość

Piotrków Kujawski

Radziejów

Radzyń Chełmiński

Rypin

Sępólno Krajeńskie

Solec Kujawski

Strzelno

Szubin

Skępe

Świecie

Tuchola

Wąbrzeźno

Więcbork

Włocławek

Żnin

Aleksandrów County

Brodnica County

Bydgoszcz County

Chełmno County

Golub-Dobrzyń County

Grudziądz County

Inowrocław County

Lipno County

Mogilno County

Nakło County

Rypin County

Radziejów County

Sępólno County

Świecie County

Toruń County

Tuchola County

Wąbrzeźno County

Włocławek County

Żnin County

=== Lesser Poland Voivodeship ===
Kraków

Alwernia

Andrychów

Biecz

Bobowa

Bochnia

Brzesko

Brzeszcze

Bukowno

Chełmek

Chrzanów

Ciężkowice

Czchów

Dąbrowa Tarnowska

Dobczyce

Gorlice

Grybów

Jordanów

Kalwaria Zebrzydowska

Kęty

Koszyce

Krynica-Zdrój

Krzeszowice

Libiąż

Limanowa

Maków Podhalański

Miechów

Mszana Dolna

Muszyna

Myślenice

Niepołomice

Nowy Sącz

Nowy Targ

Nowy Wiśnicz

Olkusz

Oświęcim

Piwniczna-Zdrój

Proszowice

Rabka-Zdrój

Radłów

Ryglice

Skała

Skawina

Słomniki

Stary Sącz

Sucha Beskidzka

Sułkowice

Szczawnica

Szczucin

Świątniki Górne

Tarnów

Trzebinia

Tuchów

Wadowice

Wieliczka

Wojnicz

Wolbrom

Zakliczyn

Zakopane

Zator, Lesser Poland Voivodeship

Żabno

Bochnia County

Brzesko County

Chrzanów County

Dąbrowa County

Gorlice County

Kraków County

Limanowa County

Miechów County

Myślenice County

Nowy Sącz County

Nowy Targ County

Oświęcim County

Olkusz County

Proszowice County

Tarnów County

Tatra County

Sucha County

Wadowice County

Wieliczka County

=== Łódź Voivodeship ===
Łódź

Aleksandrów Łódzki

Bełchatów

Biała Rawska

Błaszki

Brzeziny

Drzewica

Działoszyn

Głowno

Kamieńsk

Koluszki

Konstantynów Łódzki

Krośniewice

Kutno

Łask

Łęczyca

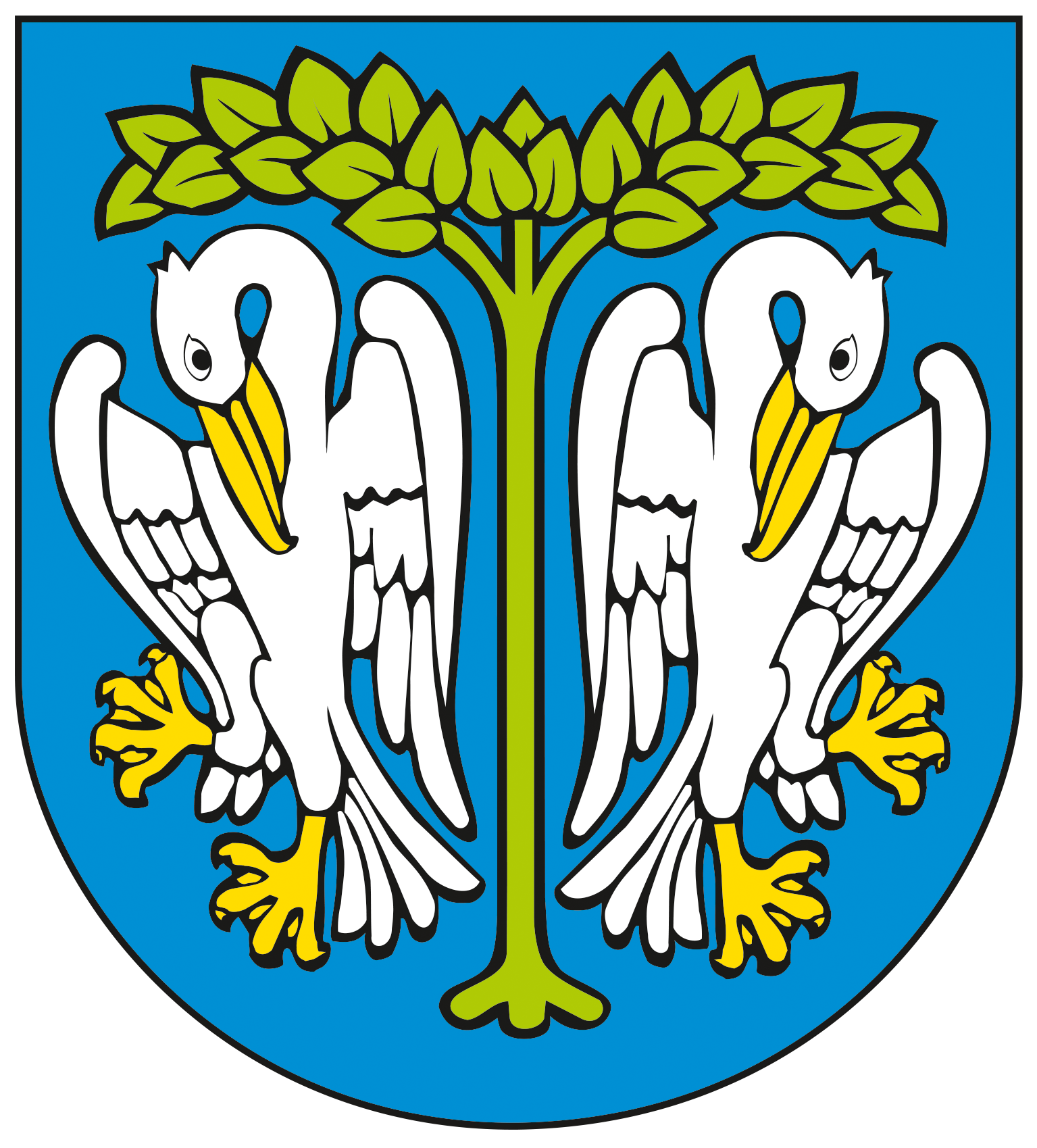
Łowicz

Opoczno

Ozorków

Pajęczno

Pabianice

Piotrków Trybunalski

Poddębice

Przedbórz

Radomsko

Rawa Mazowiecka

Rzgów

Sieradz

Skierniewice

Stryków

Sulejów

Szadek

Tomaszów Mazowiecki

Tuszyn

Uniejów

Warta

Wieluń

Wieruszów

Wolbórz

Zduńska Wola

Zelów

Zgierz

Złoczew

Żychlin

Bełchatów County

Brzeziny County

Kutno County

Łask County

Łęczyca County

Łódź East County

Łowicz County

Opoczno County

Pabianice County

Pajęczno County

Piotrków County

Poddębice County

Radomsko County

Rawa County

Sieradz County

Skierniewice County

Tomaszów County

Wieluń County

Wieruszów County

Zgierz County

Zduńska Wola County

=== Lower Silesian Voivodeship ===
Wrocław

Bardo

Bielawa

Bierutów

Bogatynia

Boguszów-Gorce

Bolesławiec

Bolesławów

Bolków

Brzeg Dolny

Bystrzyca Kłodzka

Chobienia

Chocianów

Chojnów

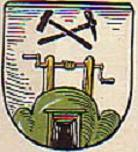
Ciechanowice

Czernina

Dobromierz

Duszniki-Zdrój

Dzierżoniów

Głogów

Głuszyca

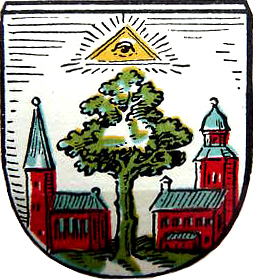
Goszcz

Góra

Gryfów Śląski

Jawor

Jaworzyna Śląska

Jedlina-Zdrój

Jelcz-Laskowice

Jelenia Góra

Kamienna Góra

Karpacz

Kąty Wrocławskie

Kłodzko

Kowary

Kudowa-Zdrój

Lądek-Zdrój

Legnica

Leśna

Lewin Kłodzki

Lubań

Lubawka

Lubiąż

Lubin

Lubomierz

Lwówek Śląski

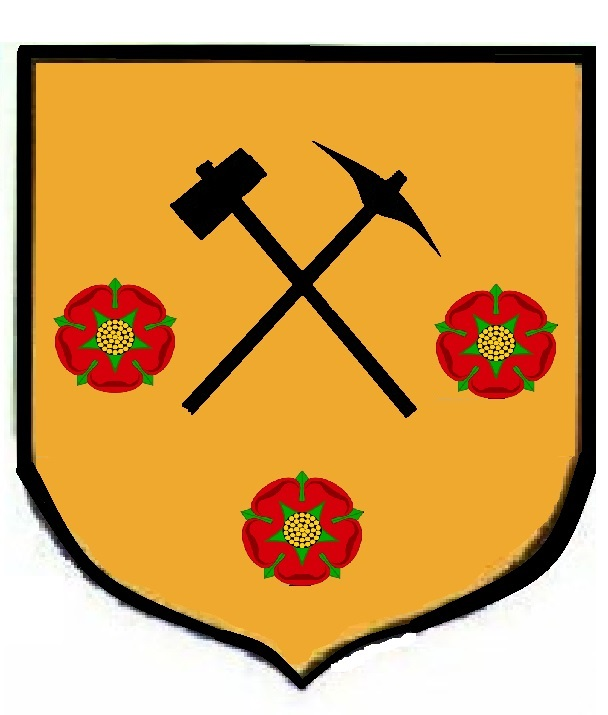
Miedzianka

Międzybórz

Mieroszów

Międzylesie

Milicz

Mirsk

Niemcza

Nowa Ruda

Nowogrodziec

Oborniki Śląskie

Oleśnica

Olszyna

Oława

Piechowice

Pieńsk

Pieszyce

Piława Górna

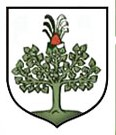
Pobiedna

Polanica-Zdrój

Polkowice

Prochowice

Prusice

Przemków

Przeworno

Radków

Rudna

Siechnice

Sobótka

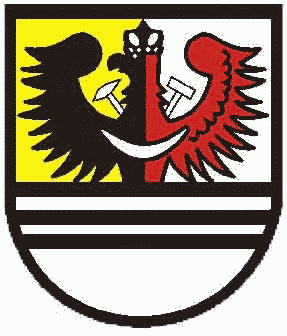
Srebrna Góra

Stronie Śląskie

Strupina

Strzegom

Strzelin

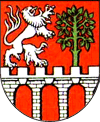
Sułów

Syców

Szczawno-Zdrój

Szczytna

Szklarska Poręba

Środa Śląska

Ścinawa

Świdnica

Świebodzice

Świeradów-Zdrój

Świerzawa

Trzebnica

Twardogóra

Uraz

Wałbrzych

Wąsosz

Węgliniec

Wiązów

Wleń

Wojcieszów

Wołów

Zawidów

Ząbkowice Śląskie

Zgorzelec

Ziębice

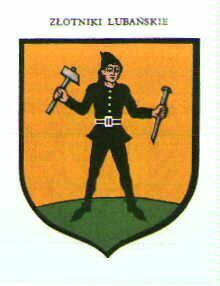
Złotniki Lubańskie

Złotoryja

Złoty Stok

Żarów

Żmigród

Żórawina

Bolesławiec County

Dzierżoniów County

Głogów County

Góra County

Jawor County

Kamienna Góra County

Karkonosze County

Kłodzko County

Legnica County

Lubań County

Lubin County

Lwówek County

Milicz County

Oleśnica County

Oława County

Polkowice County

Strzelin County

Środa County

Świdnica County

Trzebnica County

Wałbrzych County

Wołów County

Wrocław County

Ząbkowice County

Zgorzelec County

Złotoryja County

=== Lublin Voivodeship ===
Lublin

Annopol

Bełżyce

Biała Podlaska

Biłgoraj

Bychawa

Chełm

Dęblin

Frampol

Hrubieszów

Janów Lubelski

Józefów

Józefów nad Wisłą

Kock

Krasnobród

Krasnystaw

Kraśnik

Kazimierz Dolny

Lubartów

Lubycza Królewska

Łaszczów

Łęczna

Łuków

Międzyrzec Podlaski

Modliborzyce

Nałęczów

Opole Lubelskie

Ostrów Lubelski

Parczew

Piaski

Poniatowa

Puławy

Radzyń Podlaski

Rejowiec

Rejowiec Fabryczny

Ryki

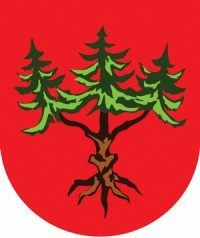
Siedliszcze

Stoczek Łukowski

Szczebrzeszyn

Świdnik

Tarnogród

Terespol

Tomaszów Lubelski

Tyszowce

Urzędów

Włodawa

Zamość

Zwierzyniec

Biłgoraj County

Biała County

Chełm County

Hrubieszów County

Janów County

Krasnystaw County

Kraśnik County

Lubartów County

Lublin County

Łęczna County

Łuków County

Opole County

Parczew County

Puławy County

Radzyń County

Ryki County

Świdnik County

Tomaszów County

Włodawa County

Zamość County

=== Lubusz Voivodeshipp ===
Gorzów Wielkopolski

Zielona Góra

Babimost

Bytom Odrzański

Cybinka

Czerwieńsk

Dobiegniew

Drezdenko

Gozdnica

Gubin

Iłowa

Jasień

Kargowa

Kostrzyn nad Odrą

Kożuchów

Krosno Odrzańskie

Lubniewice

Lubsko

Łęknica

Małomice

Międzyrzecz

Nowa Sól

Nowe Miasteczko

Nowogród Bobrzański

Ośno Lubuskie

Rzepin

Skwierzyna

Sława

Słubice

Strzelce Krajeńskie

Sulechów

Sulęcin

Szlichtyngowa

Szprotawa

Świebodzin

Torzym

Trzciel

Witnica

Wschowa

Zbąszynek

Żagań

Żary

Gorzów County

Krosno County

Międzyrzecz County

Nowa Sól County

Słubice County

Strzelce-Drezdenko County

Sulęcin County

Świebodzin County

Wschowa County

Zielona Góra County

Żagań County

Żary County

=== Masovian Voivodeship ===
Warsaw

Białobrzegi

Bieżuń

Błonie

Brok

Brwinów

Chorzele

Ciechanów

Drobin

Garwolin

Gąbin

Glinojeck

Gostynin

Grodzisk Mazowiecki

Góra Kalwaria

Grójec

Halinów

Iłża

Józefów

Kałuszyn

Karczew

Kobyłka

Konstancin-Jeziorna

Kosów Lacki

Kozienice

Legionowo

Lipsko

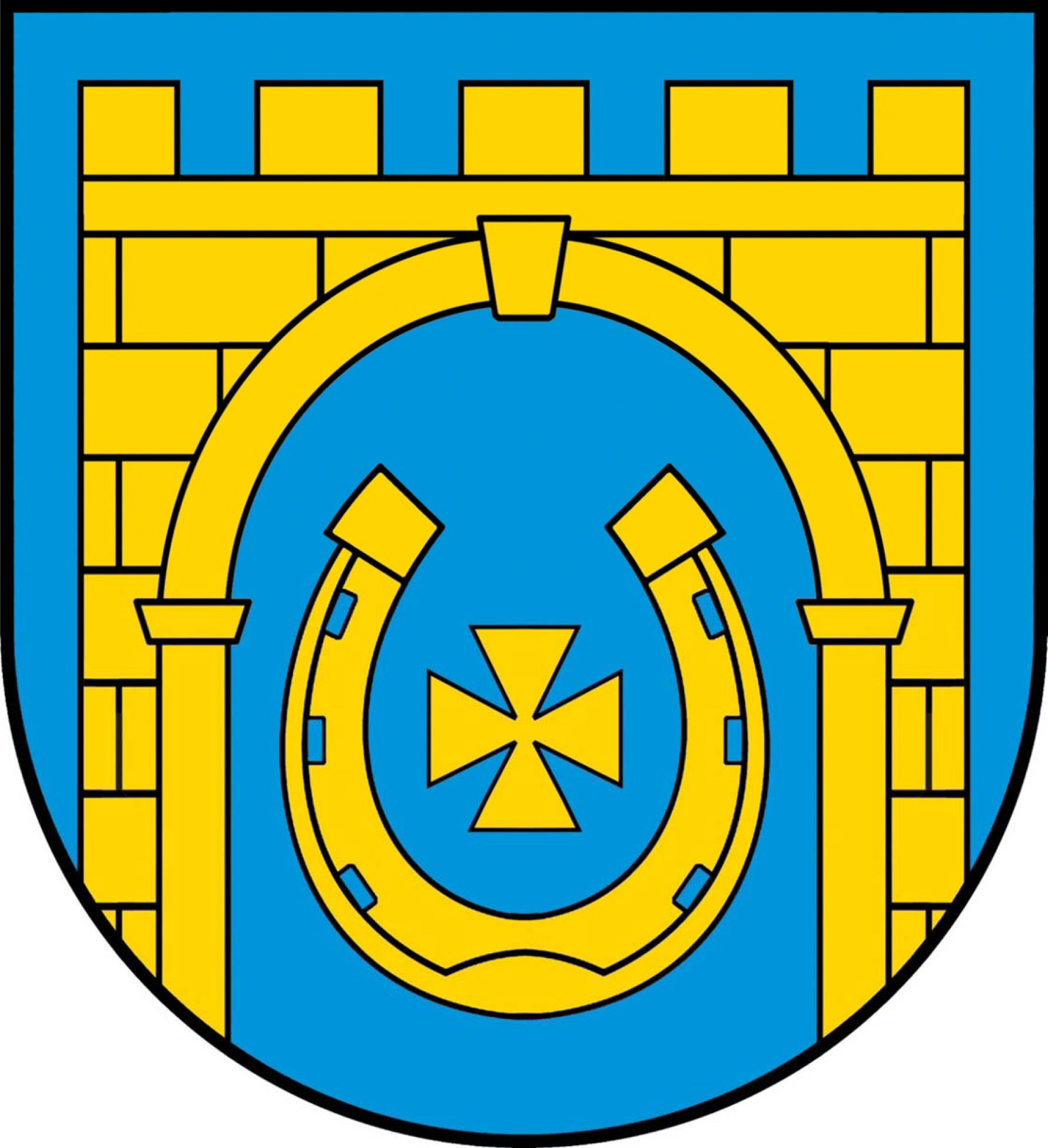
Lubowidz

Łaskarzew

Łąck

Łochów

Łomianki

Łosice

Maków Mazowiecki

Mława

Marki

Milanówek

Mińsk Mazowiecki

Mogielnica

Mordy

Mrozy

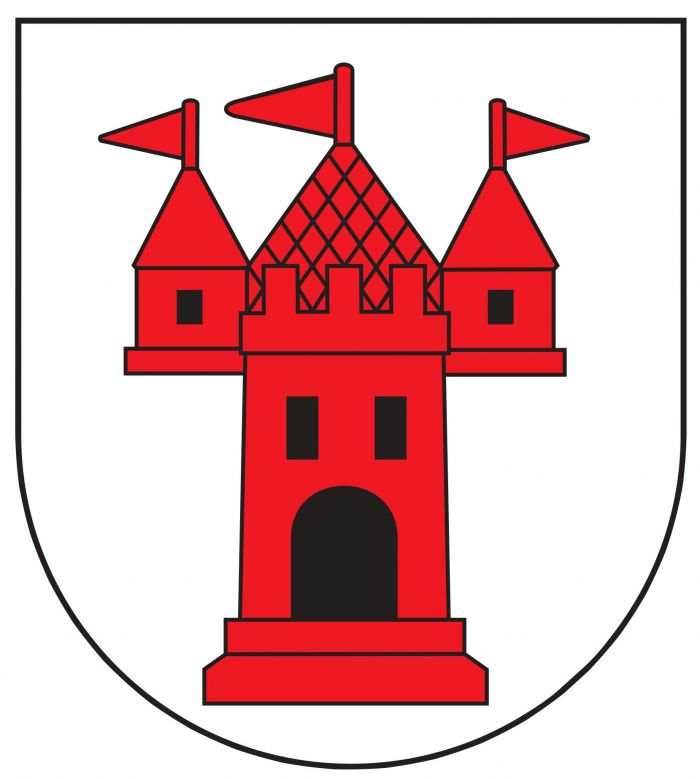
Mszczonów

Myszyniec

Nasielsk

Nowe Miasto nad Pilicą

Nowy Dwór Mazowiecki

Ostrołęka

Ostrów Mazowiecka

Otwock

Piaseczno

Piastów

Pilawa

Pionki

Płock

Płońsk

Podkowa Leśna

Pruszków

Przasnysz

Przysucha

Pułtusk

Raciąż

Radom

Radzymin

Różan

Sanniki

Serock

Siedlce

Sierpc

Skaryszew

Sochaczew

Sokołów Podlaski

Sulejówek

Szydłowiec

Tarczyn

Tłuszcz

Warka

Węgrów

Wołomin

Wyszogród

Wyszków

Wyśmierzyce

Zakroczym

Ząbki

Zielonka

Zwoleń

Żelechów

Żuromin

Żyrardów

Białobrzegi County

Ciechanów County

Garwolin County

Gostynin County

Grodzisk County

Grójec County

Kozienice County

Legionowo County

Lipsko County

Łosice County

Maków County

Mińsk County

Mława County

Nowy Dwór County

Ostrów County

Otwock County

Piaseczno County

Płock County

Pułtusk County

Płońsk County

Pruszków County

Przasnysz County

Przysucha County

Radom County

Siedlce County

Sierpc County

Sochaczew County

Sokołów County

Szydłowiec County

Warsaw West County

Węgrów County

Wołomin County

Wyszków County

Zwoleń County

Żuromin County

Żyrardów County

=== Opole Voivodeship ===
Opole

Baborów

Biała

Brzeg

Byczyna

Dobrodzień

Głogówek

Głuchołazy

Głubczyce

Gogolin

Gorzów Śląski

Grodków

Kędzierzyn-Koźle

Kietrz

Kluczbork

Kolonowskie

Korfantów

Krapkowice

Leśnica

Lewin Brzeski

Namysłów

Niemodlin

Nysa

Olesno

Otmuchów

Ozimek

Paczków

Praszka

Prószków

Prudnik

Strzelce Opolskie

Ujazd

Wołczyn

Zawadzkie

Zdzieszowice

Brzeg County

Głubczyce County

Kędzierzyn-Koźle County

Kluczbork County

Namysłów County

Nysa County

Olesno County

Opole County

Prudnik County

Strzelce County

=== Podlaskie Voivodeship ===
Białystok

Augustów

Brańsk

Bielsk Podlaski

Choroszcz

Ciechanowiec

Czarna Białostocka

Czyżew

Dąbrowa Białostocka

Drohiczyn

Goniądz

Grajewo

Hajnówka

Jedwabne

Kleszczele

Knyszyn

Kolno

Krynki

Lipsk

Łapy

Łomża

Michałowo

Mońki

Nowogród

Rajgród

Sejny

Siemiatycze

Sokółka

Suchowola

Supraśl

Suraż

Suwałki

Szczuczyn

Szepietowo

Tykocin

Wasilków

Wysokie Mazowieckie

Zabłudów

Zambrów

Augustów County

Białystok County

Bielsk County

Grajewo County

Hajnówka County

Kolno County

Łomża County

Mońki County

Sejny County

Siemiatycze County

Sokółka County

Suwałki County

Wysokie Mazowieckie County

Zambrów County

=== Pomeranian Voivodeship ===
Gdańsk

Brusy

Bytów

Chojnice

Czarna Woda

Czarne

Czersk

Człuchów

Debrzno

Dzierzgoń

Gdynia

Gniew

Hel

Jastarnia

Kartuzy

Kępice

Kościerzyna

Krynica Morska

Kwidzyn

Lębork

Łeba

Malbork

Miastko

Nowy Dwór Gdański

Nowy Staw

Pelplin

Prabuty

Pruszcz Gdański

Puck

Rumia

Reda

Skarszewy

Skórcz

Słupsk

Sopot

Starogard Gdański

Sztum

Tczew

Ustka

Wejherowo

Władysławowo

Żukowo

Bytów County

Chojnice County

Człuchów County

Gdańsk County

Kartuzy County

Kwidzyn County

Kościerzyna County

Lębork County

Malbork County

Nowy Dwór County

Puck County

Słupsk County

Starogard County

Sztum County

Tczew County

Wejherowo County

=== Podkarpackie Voivodeship ===
Rzeszów

Baranów Sandomierski

Brzostek

Brzozów

Cieszanów

Czersk

Dębica

Dukla

Iwonicz-Zdrój

Jarosław

Jasło

Jedlicze

Kańczuga

Krosno

Kolbuszowa

Kołaczyce

Lesko

Leżajsk

Lubaczów

Łańcut

Mielec

Narol

Nisko

Nowa Dęba

Nowa Sarzyna

Oleszyce

Pilzno

Pruchnik

Przecław

Przemyśl

Przeworsk

Radomyśl Wielki

Radymno

Ropczyce

Rudnik nad Sanem

Rymanów

Sanok

Sędziszów Małopolski

Sieniawa

Stalowa Wola

Strzyżów

Tarnobrzeg

Ulanów

Ustrzyki Dolne

Zagórz

Zaklików

Bieszczady County

Brzozów County

Dębica County

Jarosław County

Jasło County

Kolbuszowa County

Krosno County

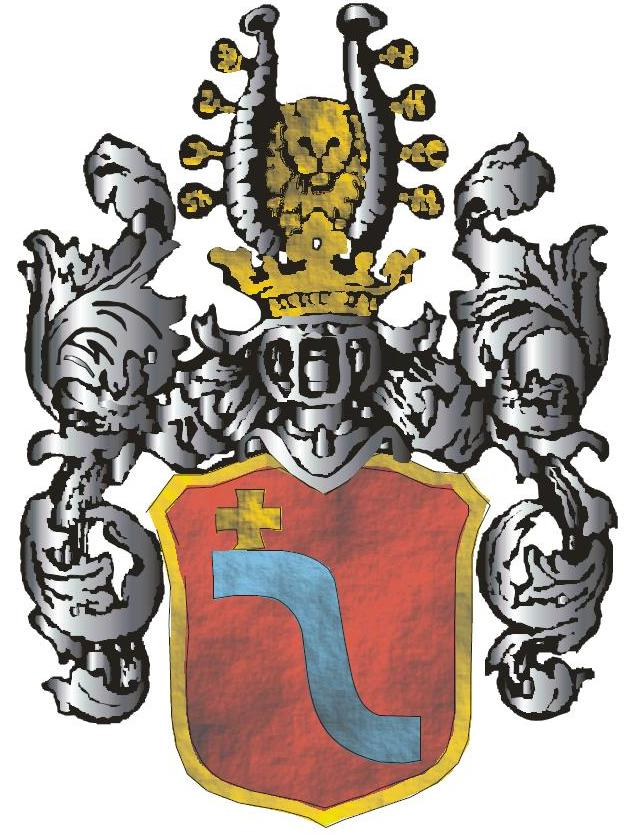
Lesko County

Leżajsk County

Lubaczów County

Łańcut County

Mielec County

Nisko County

Przemyśl County

Przeworsk County

Ropczyce-Sędziszów County

Sanok County

Stalowa Wola County

Strzyżów County

Tarnobrzeg County

=== Świętokrzyskie Voivodeship ===
Kielce

Bodzentyn

Bogoria

Busko-Zdrój

Chęciny

Chmielnik

Ćmielów

Daleszyce

Działoszyce

Kazimierza Wielka

Końskie

Koprzywnica

Kunów

Małogoszcz

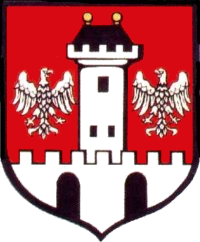
Nowy Korczyn

Oleśnica

Opatów

Osiek

Ostrowiec Świętokrzyski

Ożarów

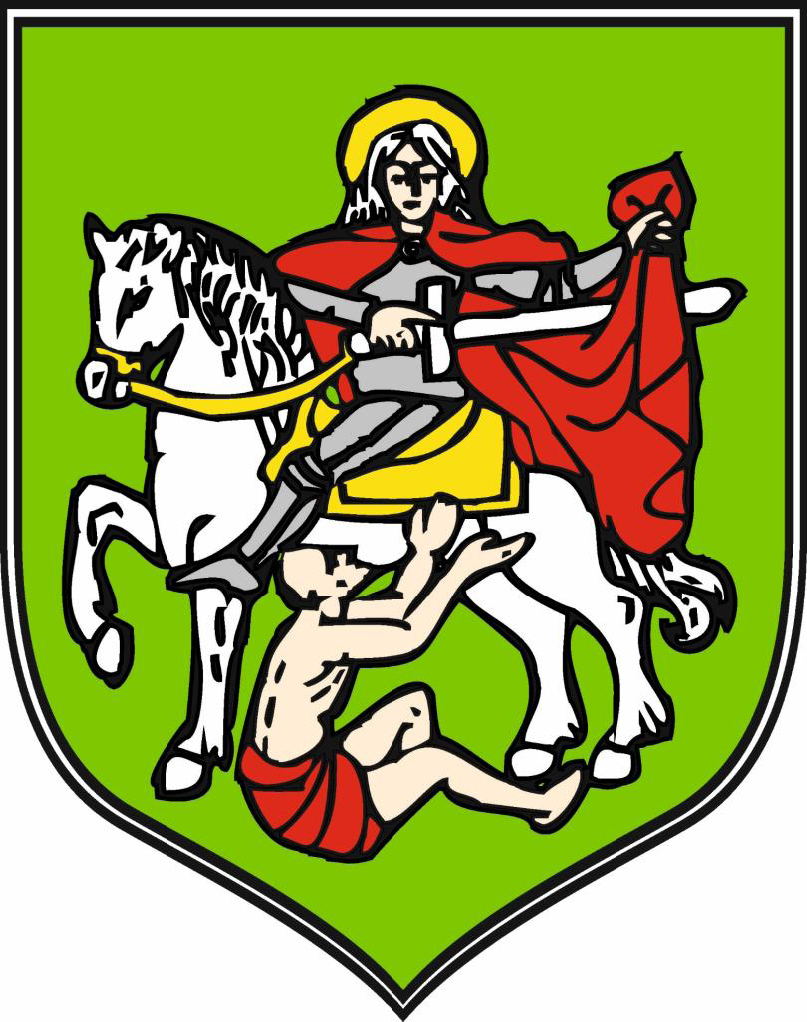
Pacanów

Pińczów

Połaniec

Radoszyce

Sandomierz

Starachowice

Staszów

Stąporków

Sędziszów

Skalbmierz

Skarżysko-Kamienna

Suchedniów

Szydłów

Wąchock

Włoszczowa

Zawichost

Jędrzejów

Bogoria County

Busko County

Jędrzejów County

Kazimierza County

Kielce County

Końskie County

Opatów County

Ostrowiec County

Pińczów County

Sandomierz County

Skarżysko County

Staszów County

Starachowice County

Włoszczowa County

=== Warmian-Masurian Voivodeship ===
Olsztyn

Barczewo

Bartoszyce

Biała Piska

Biskupiec

Bisztynek

Braniewo

Dobre Miasto

Działdowo

Elbląg

Ełk

Frombork

Giżycko

Gołdap

Górowo Iławeckie

Iława

Jeziorany

Kętrzyn

Kisielice

Korsze

Lidzbark

Lidzbark Warmiński

Lubawa

Mikołajki

Miłakowo

Miłomłyn

Młynary

Morąg

Mrągowo

Nidzica

Nowe Miasto Lubawskie

Olecko

Olsztynek

Orneta

Orzysz

Ostróda

Pasłęk

Pasym

Pieniężno

Pisz

Reszel

Ruciane-Nida

Ryn

Sępopol

Susz

Szczytno

Tolkmicko

Węgorzewo

Wielbark

Zalewo

Bartoszyce County

Braniewo County

Działdowo County

Elbląg County

Ełk County

Giżycko County

Gołdap County

Iława County

Kętrzyn County

Lidzbark County

Mrągowo County

Nidzica County

Nowe Miasto County

Olecko County

Olsztyn County

Ostróda County

Pisz County

Szczytno County

Węgorzewo County

=== West Pomeranian Voivodeship ===
Szczecin

Barlinek

Barwice

Białogard

Biały Bór

Bobolice

Borne Sulinowo

Cedynia

Chociwel

Choszczno

Chojna

Człopa

Czaplinek

Darłowo

Dębno

Dobra

Dobrzany

Drawno

Drawsko Pomorskie

Dziwnów

Goleniów

Golczewo

Gościno

Gryfice

Gryfino

Ińsko

Kamień Pomorski

Karlino

Kalisz Pomorski

Kołobrzeg

Koszalin

Lipiany

Łobez

Maszewo

Mielno

Mieszkowice

Międzyzdroje

Mirosławiec

Moryń

Myślibórz

Nowe Warpno

Nowogard

Pełczyce

Płoty

Police

Polanów

Połczyn-Zdrój

Pyrzyce

Recz

Resko

Sianów

Sławno

Stepnica

Suchań

Szczecinek

Świdwin

Świnoujście

Trzcińsko-Zdrój

Trzebiatów

Tuczno

Tychowo

Wałcz

Węgorzyno

Wolin

Złocieniec

Białogard County

Choszczno County

Drawsko County

Goleniów County

Gryfice County

Gryfino County

Kamień County

Kołobrzeg County

Koszalin County

Łobez County

Myślibórz County

Police County

Pyrzyce County

Sławno County

Stargard County

Szczecinek County

Świdwin County

Wałcz County

== See also ==
- Flags of Polish voivodeships
