= Gmina Olszyna =

Gmina Olszyna Olszyna Commune
- Gmina
- Flag Coat of arms
- Interactive map of Gmina Olszyna
- Coordinates (Olszyna): 51°04′00″N 15°23′20″E
- Country: Poland
- Voivodeship: Lower Silesian
- County: Lubań
- Seat: Olszyna

Area
  - Total: 47.16 km^{2} (18.21 sq mi)

Population (2019-06-30)
  - Total: 6,504
  - Density: 137.9/km^{2} (357.2/sq mi)
  - Urban: 4,348
  - Rural: 2,156
- Website: http://www.olszyna.pl/

Gmina Olszyna is an urban-rural gmina (administrative district) in Lubań County, Lower Silesian Voivodeship, in south-western Poland. Its seat is the town of Olszyna, which lies approximately 9 kilometres (6 mi) south-east of Lubań, and 116 kilometres (72 mi) west of the regional capital Wrocław.

The gmina covers an area of 47.16 square kilometres (18.2 sq mi), and as of 2019 its total population is 6,504.

== Neighbouring gminas ==
Gmina Olszyna is bordered by the gminas of Gryfów Śląski, Leśna and Lubań.

== Villages ==
Apart from the town of Olszyna, the gmina contains the villages of Biedrzychowice, Bożkowice, Grodnica, Kałużna, Karłowice, Krzewie Małe, Nowa Świdnica and Zapusta.

== Twin towns – sister cities ==
Gmina Olszyna is twinned with:

- Großschönau, Germany
- Ørbæk (Nyborg), Denmark
- Pershotravensk, Ukraine
- Železný Brod, Czech Republic
