= Olszyna =

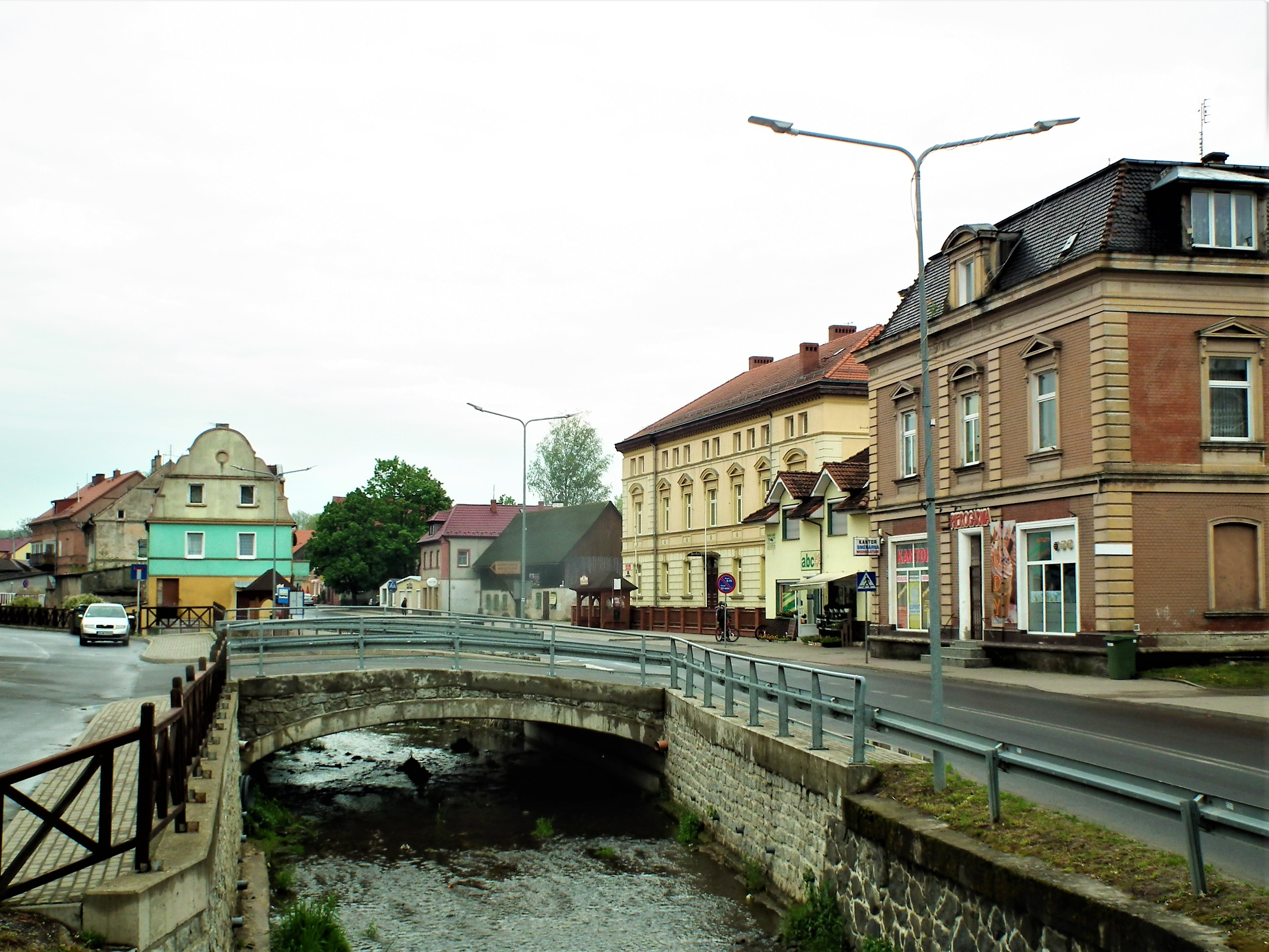
- Town center

- Flag Coat of arms

- Location within Poland
- Coordinates: 51°4′0″N 15°23′20″E
- Country: Poland
- Voivodeship: Lower Silesian
- County: Lubań
- Gmina: Olszyna
- Town rights: 2005

Area
  - Total: 20.26 km^{2} (7.82 sq mi)

Population (2019-06-30)
  - Total: 4,348
  - Density: 214.6/km^{2} (555.8/sq mi)
- Time zone: UTC+1 (CET)
  - Summer (DST): UTC+2 (CEST)
- Postal code: 59-830
- Area code: +48 75
- License plates: DLB
- Website: http://www.olszyna.pl

Olszyna [ɔlˈʂɨna] (German: Langenöls) is a town in Lubań County, Lower Silesian Voivodeship, in south-western Poland. Its name means "alder wood" in Polish. It is the seat of the administrative district (gmina) called Gmina Olszyna. A settlement dating back to the Middle Ages, it received its town charter in 2005. As of 2019, the town has a population of 4,348.
