= Zapusta, Lower Silesian Voivodeship =

Zapusta
- Village
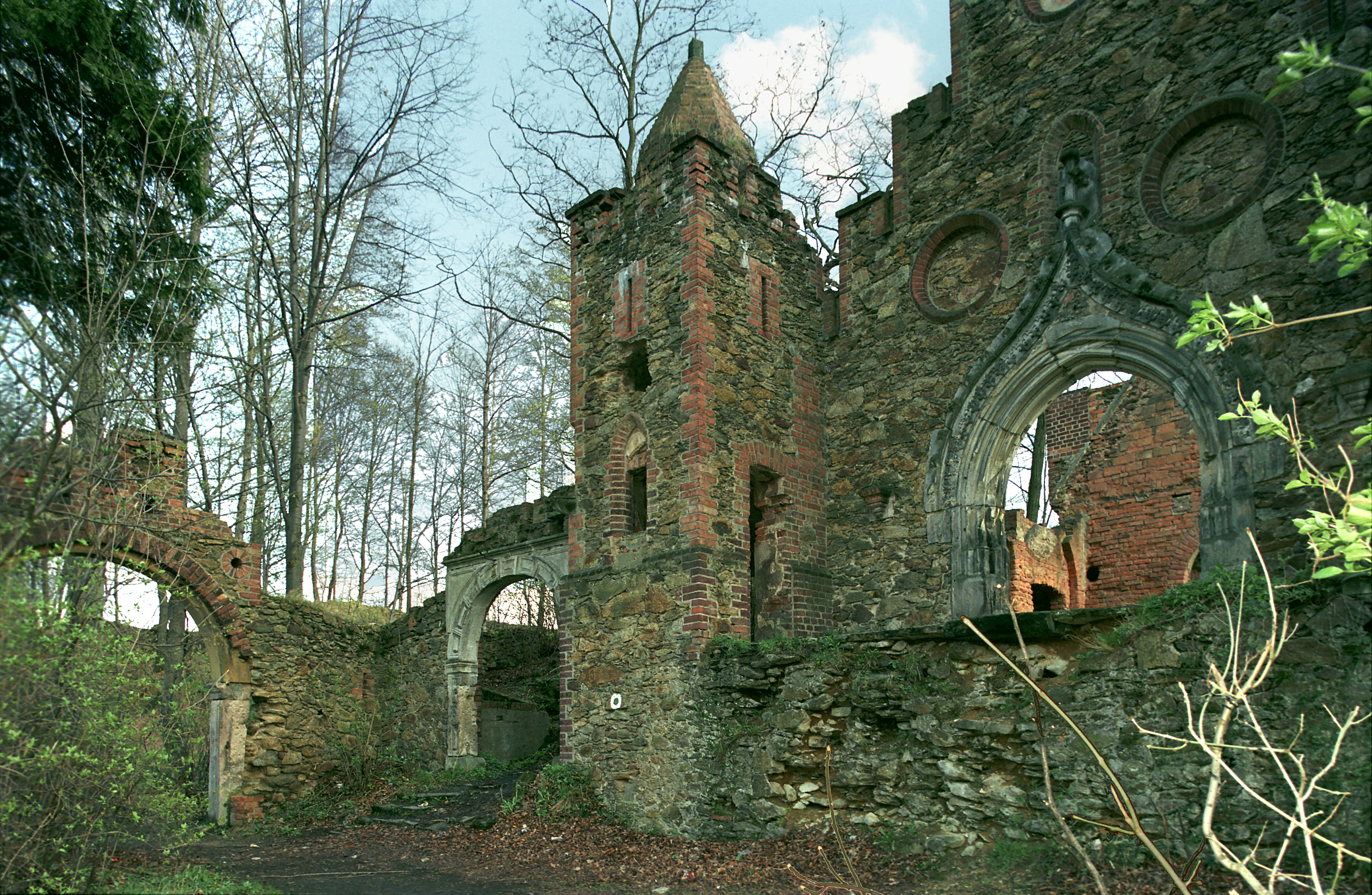
- Castle ruins

- Location within Poland
- Coordinates: 51°01′50″N 15°20′53″E
- Country: Poland
- Voivodeship: Lower Silesian
- County: Lubań
- Gmina: Olszyna
- Population (approx.): 50

Zapusta [zaˈpusta] is a village in the administrative district of Gmina Olszyna, within Lubań County, Lower Silesian Voivodeship, in south-western Poland.

The village has an approximate population of 50.
