= Wrocław Voivodeship (1975–1998) =

Former administrative division of Poland

Coordinates: 51°07′00″N 17°02′00″E

Wrocław Voivodeship Województwo wrocławskie
- Voivodeship of Poland
- 1975–1998
- Location within Poland
- Capital: Wrocław
- Area
  - 1998: 6,287 km^{2} (2,427 sq mi)
- Population
  - 1998: 1,136,700
- History
  - Established: 1975
  - Disestablished: 1998
Succeeded by
Lower Silesian Voivodeship

Wrocław Voivodeship (Polish: województwo wrocławskie) was a voivodeship (province) of Poland that existed from 1975 until 31 December 1998, when it was absorbed into the larger Lower Silesian Voivodeship.

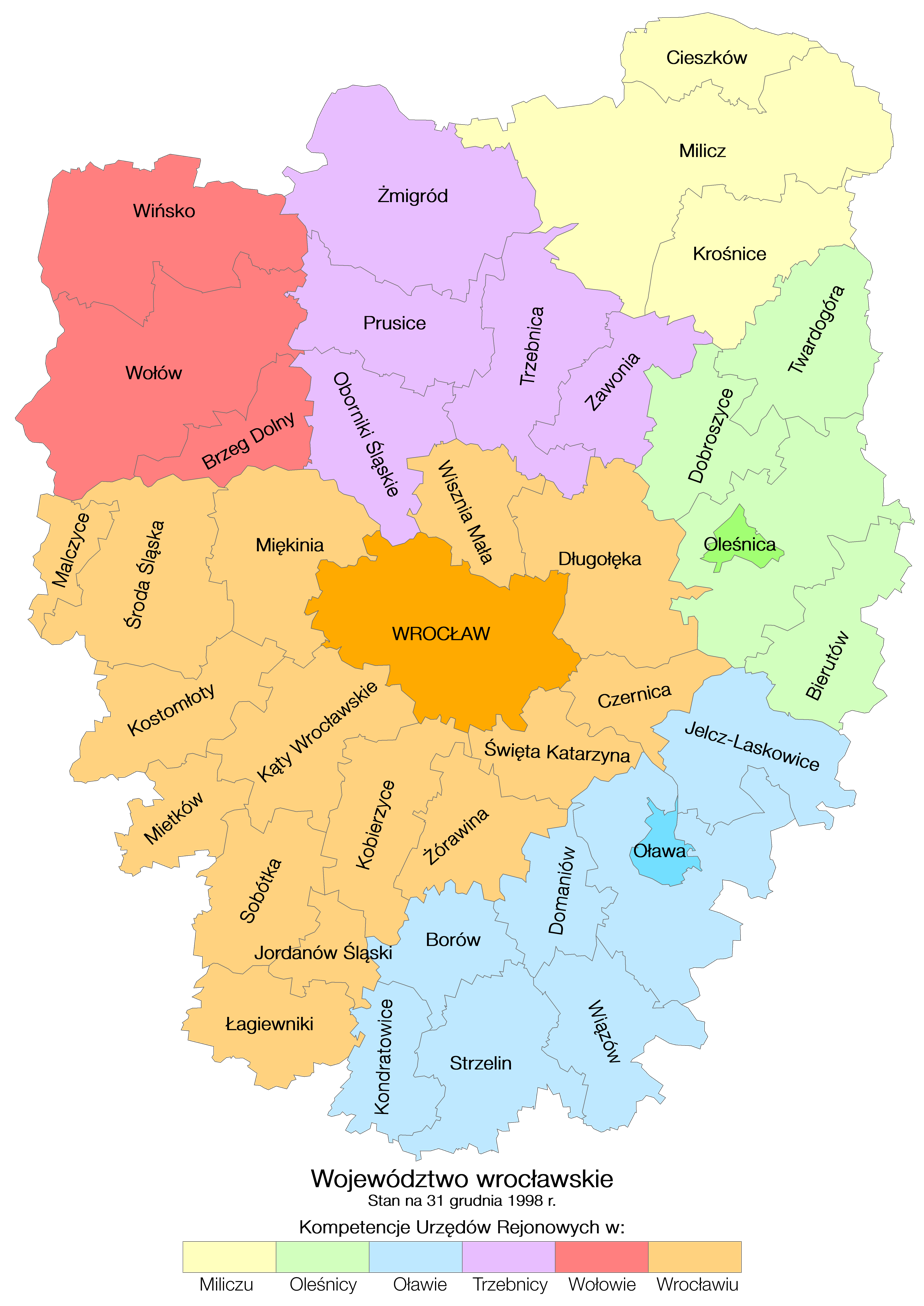
Map of the voivodeship by cities and gminy.

== Major cities and towns (population in 1995) ==
- Wrocław (642,700)
- Oleśnica (38,900)
- Oława (31,800)

== See also ==
- Voivodeships of Poland
