= Kalyuzhny =

Kalyuzhny is a surname which is spelled variously in different languages. Some languages also have a feminine form. The surname derives from the word meaning "pool" or "puddle" in some Slavic languages, e.g., Polish: kałuża, Czech:kaluž.

Language	Masculine	Feminine
Belarusian (Romanization)	Калюжны (Kalyuzhny, Kaliuzhny, Kaliužny)	Калюжная (Kalyuzhnaya, Kaliuzhnaya, Kaliuzhnaia, Kaliužnaja)
Czech/Slovak	Kalužný	Kalužná
Polish	Kałużny	Kałużna
Russian (Romanization)	Калюжный (Kalyuzhnyi, Kalyuzhnyy, Kaliuzhnyi)	Калюжная (Kalyuzhnaya, Kaliuzhnaia, Kaliuzhnaya)
Ukrainian (Romanization)	Калюжний (Kalyuzhnyi, Kalyuzhnyy, Kaliuzhnyi)	Калюжна (Kalyuzhna, Kaliuzhna)
Other	Kaluzhny, Kaljužny, Kalioujny, Kalushny, Kaluschny, Kaluzsni	

== People ==
- Alexei Kalyuzhny (born 1977), Belarusian ice hockey player
- Ivan Kalyuzhnyi (born 1998), Ukrainian footballer
- Olga Kalyuzhnaya (born 1982), Russian tennis player
- Radosław Kałużny (born 1974), Polish footballer
- Viktoriia Kaliuzhna (born 1994), Ukrainian long-distance runner

== See also ==
- Doctor Kalyuzhnyy
- Kałużna (disambiguation)
