= Biedrzychowice, Lower Silesian Voivodeship =

Biedrzychowice
- Village
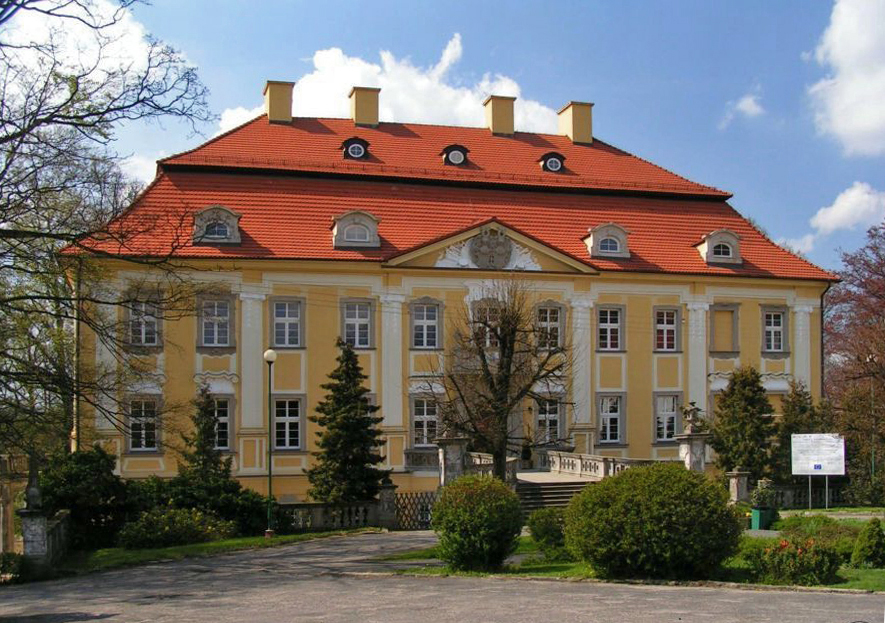
- Palace in Biedrzychowice

- Location within Poland
- Coordinates: 51°02′27″N 15°22′51″E
- Country: Poland
- Voivodeship: Lower Silesian
- County: Lubań
- Gmina: Olszyna

Biedrzychowice [bjɛdʐɨxɔˈvit͡sɛ] is a village in the administrative district of Gmina Olszyna, within Lubań County, Lower Silesian Voivodeship, in south-western Poland.

The school in Biedrzychowice is an example of baroque architecture from five centuries past. It was assigned to the register of monuments of the National Institute of Heritage. Building was begun by order of the first owner, Konrad von Nostitz, in 1527, and was completed in 1580. It was renovated by Moritz Christian von Schweinitz in 1702 in the baroque architecture style. It stayed in the hands of von Pfeil family until the end of World War II. It was then used as an office of the Państwowe Gospodarstwo Rolne farm authority, and in 1960 was converted to an educational institute.
