= List of flags of the subdivisions of Poland =

This is a list of the flags of the subdivisions of Poland: voivodeships (first-level subdivisions), counties (second-level subdivisions), and gminas (third-level subdivions).

== Voivodeships ==
=== Current ===
State flag	Civil flag	Voivodeship English name Polish name	Design
Holy Cross		Holy Cross; Świętokrzyskie	Horizontal tricolor of blue, white and red with a yellow stripe along the hoist, emblazoned with the arms of the voivodeship in the white stripe
Kuyavia-Pomerania		Kuyavia-Pomerania; Kujawsko-Pomorskie	Horizontal tricolor of red, white and black (1:2:1)
Lodz	Lodz	Łódź; Łódzkie	Five vertical stripes of red and yellow
Lower Poland		Lesser Poland; Małopolskie	Horizontal tricolor of white, yellow and red (2:1:2)
Lower Silesia		Lower Silesia; Dolnośląskie	Yellow emblazoned with a black eagle with a white crescent and a crosslet on its chest
	Lubelskie	Lublin; Lubelskie	Horizontal tricolor of white, red and yellow (2:1:2) emblazoned with the arms of the voivodeship
	Lubuskie	Lubusz; Lubuskie	Four horizontal stripes of yellow, white, red and green (2:1:1:2) emblazoned with the arms of the voivodeship
Masovia		Masovia; Mazowieckie	Red emblazoned near the hoist with a white eagle with a golden beak and legs
Opolskie	Opolskie	Opole; Opolskie	Horizontal bicolor of yellow and blue (2:1) emblazoned with the arms of the voivodeship in the yellow stripe near the hoist
Podlaskie		Podlaskie; Podlaskie	Four horizontal stripes of white, red, yellow and blue
Pomerania		Pomerania; Pomorskie	Yellow emblazoned with a black griffin with a red tongue
	Silesia	Silesia; Śląskie	Horizontal triband of blue and yellow (2:1:2)
Subcarpathia		Subcarpathia; Podkarpackie	Vertical triband of blue and white (1:2:1) emblazoned with the arms of the voivodeship in the white stripe
Greater Poland		Greater Poland; Wielkopolskie	Trapezoid vertical bicolor of red and white emblazoned with the arms of the voivodeship in the red stripe
Warmia-Masuria		Warmia-Masuria; Warmińsko-Mazurskie	Trapezoid red flag bordered white, emblazoned with a white eagle's head in a golden crown and with a golden beak
West Pomerania		West Pomerania; Zachodniopomorskie	Vertical triband of white and red (a variant emblazoned with the arms of the voivodeship is also used)

=== Historical ===
Flag of the Zielona Góra Voivodeship (1985–1998)

Unofficial flag of the Łódź Voivodeship (1999–2000)

Flag of the Lower Silesian Voivodeship (2001–2008)

Flag of the Świętokrzyskie Voivodeship (2001–2013)

Flag of the Masovian Voivodeship (2005–2006)

Flag of the Lower Silesian Voivodeship (2008–2009)

Flag of the Pomeranian Voivodeship (2008–2010)

== Vertical flags ==
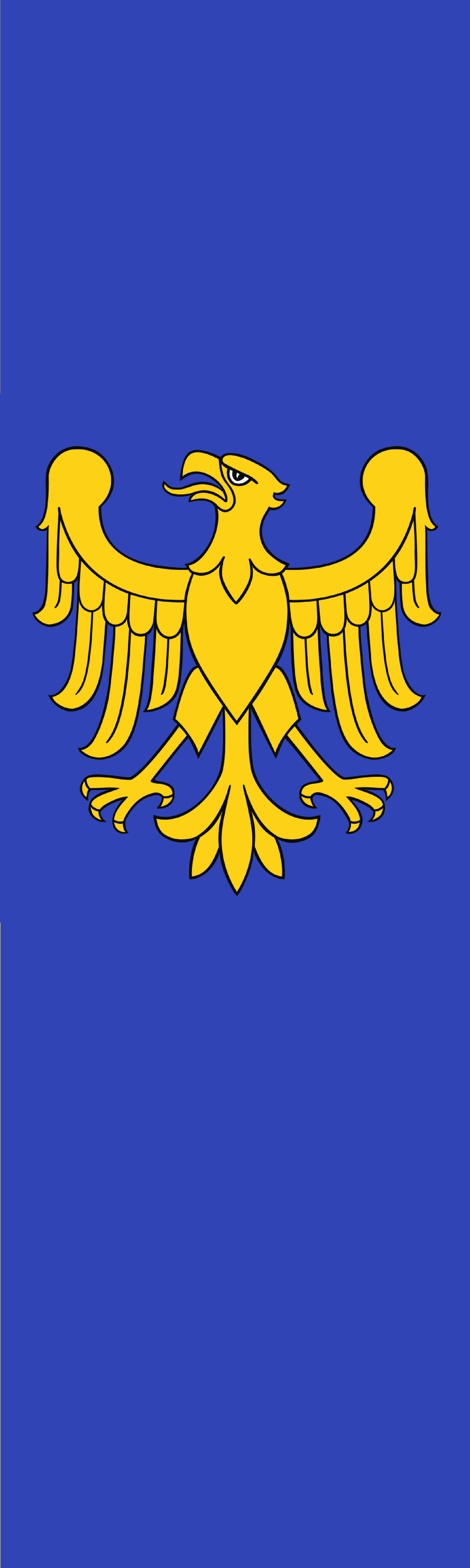
Flag of Silesian Voivodeship

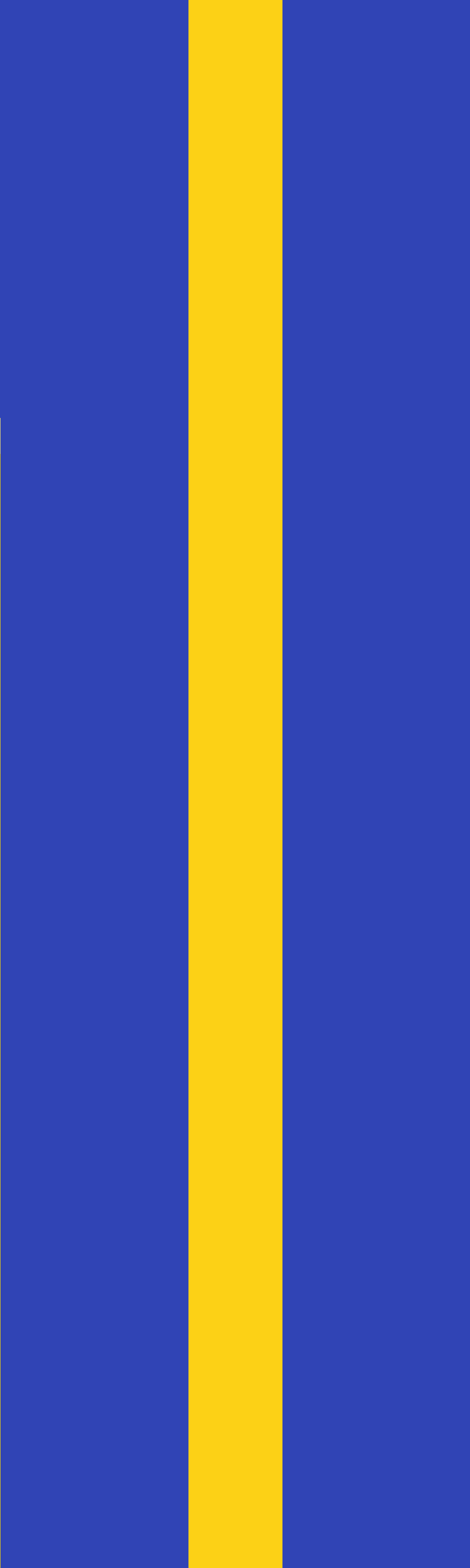
Flag of Silesian Voivodeship

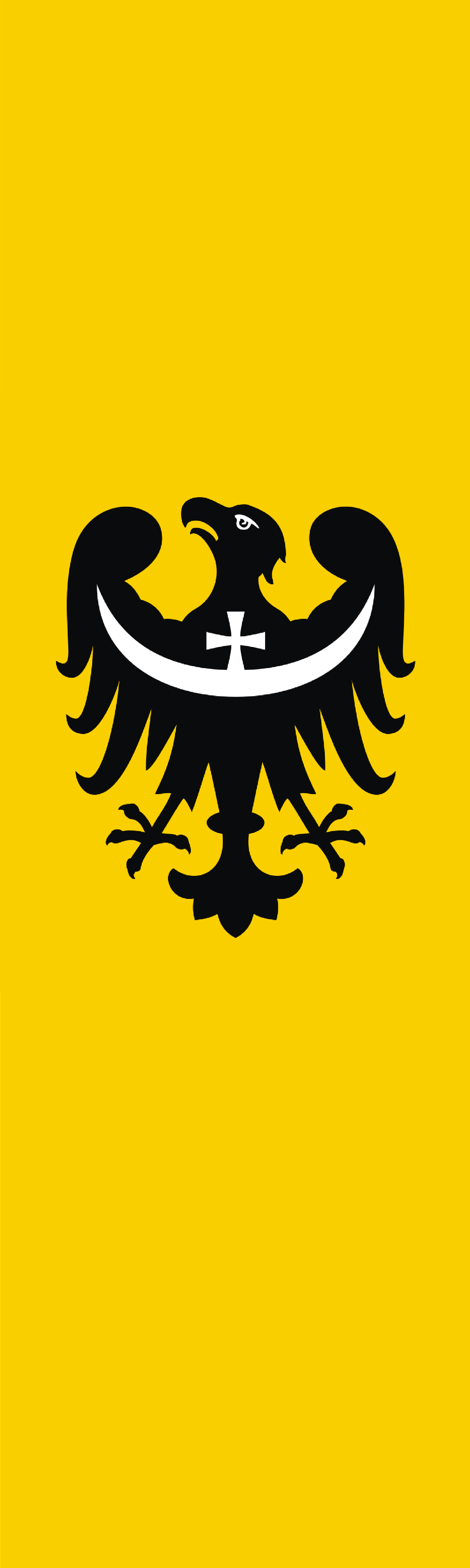
Flag of Lower Silesian Voivodeship

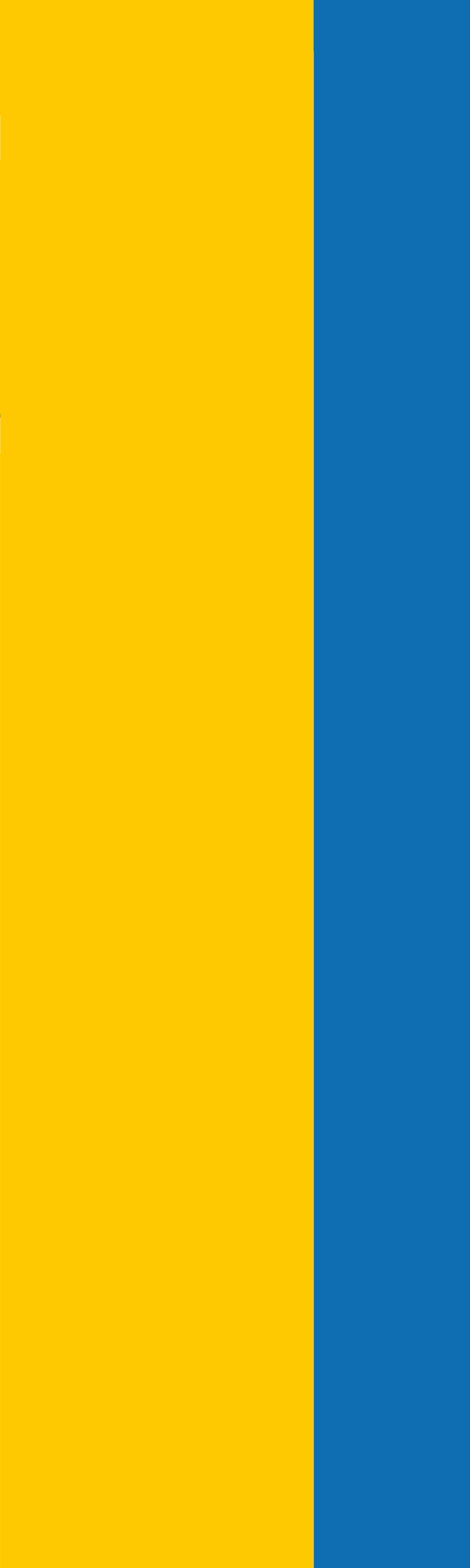
Flag of Opole Voivodeship

== Cities with powiat rights ==
Flag of Biała Podlaska

Flag of Białystok

Flag of Bielsko-Biała

Flag of Bydgoszcz

Flag of Bytom

Flag of Chełm

Flag of Chorzów

Flag of Częstochowa

Flag of Dąbrowa Górnicza

Flag of Elbląg

Flag of Gdańsk

Flag of Gdynia

Flag of Gliwice

Flag of Gorzów Wielkopolski

Flag of Grudziądz

Flag of Jastrzębie-Zdrój

Flag of Jaworzno

Flag of Jelenia Góra

Flag of Kalisz

Flag of Katowice

Flag of Kielce

Flag of Konin

Flag of Koszalin

Flag of Kraków

Flag of Krosno

Flag of Legnica

Flag of Leszno

Flag of Lublin

Flag of Łomża

Flag of Łódź

Flag of Mysłowice

Flag of Nowy Sącz

Flag of Olsztyn

Flag of Opole

Flag of Ostrołęka

Flag of Piekary Śląskie

Flag of Piotrków Trybunalski

Flag of Płock

Flag of Poznań

Flag of Przemyśl

Flag of Ruda Śląska

Flag of Rybnik

Flag of Rzeszów

Flag of Siedlce

Flag of Siemianowice Śląskie

Flag of Skierniewice

Flag of Słupsk

Flag of Sopot

Flag of Sosnowiec

Flag of Suwałki

Flag of Szczecin

Flag of Świętochłowice

Flag of Świnoujście

Flag of Tarnobrzeg

Flag of Tarnów

Flag of Toruń

Flag of Warszawa

Flag of Włocławek

Flag of Wrocław

Flag of Zabrze

Flag of Zamość

Flag of Zielona Góra

Flag of Żory

== Powiats ==
Flag of Aleksandrów County

Flag of Augustów County

Flag of Bartoszyce County

Flag of Będzin County

Flag of Bełchatów County

Flag of Białobrzegi County

Flag of Białogard County

Flag of Białystok County

Flag of Bielsk County

Flag of Bielsko County

Flag of Bieszczady County

Flag of Biłgoraj County

Flag of Bochnia County

Flag of Bolesławiec County

Flag of Braniewo County

Flag of Brodnica County

Flag of Brzeg County

Flag of Brzesko County

Flag of Brzeziny County

Flag of Brzozów County

Flag of Busko County

Flag of Bydgoszcz County

Flag of Bytów County

Flag of Chełm County

Flag of Chodzież County

Flag of Chojnice County

Flag of Choszczno County

Flag of Chrzanów County

Flag of Ciechanów County

Flag of Cieszyn County

Flag of Czarnków–Trzcianka County

Flag of Częstochowa County

Flag of Człuchów County

Flag of Dąbrowa County

Flag of Dębica County

Flag of Drawsko County

Flag of Działdowo County

Flag of Dzierżoniów County

Flag of Elbląg County

Flag of Ełk County

Flag of Garwolin County

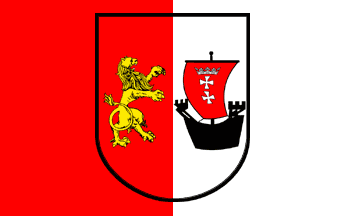
Flag of Gdańsk County

Flag of Giżycko County

Flag of Gliwice County

Flag of Głogów County

Flag of Gniezno County

Flag of Gołdap County

Flag of Golub-Dobrzyń County

Flag of Gorlice County

Flag of Gorzów County

Flag of Gostynin County

Flag of Gostyń County

Flag of Grajewo County

Flag of Grodzisk County, Greater Poland Voivodeship

Flag of Grodzisk County, Masovian Voivodeship

Flag of Gryfice County

Flag of Gryfino County

Flag of Grójec County

Flag of Hajnówka County

Flag of Inowrocław County

Flag of Iława County

Flag of Janów County

Flag of Jarocin County

Flag of Jawor County

Flag of Jędrzejów County

Flag of Kalisz County

Flag of Kamienna Góra County

Flag of Kamień County

Flag of Karkonosze County

Flag of Kartuzy County

Flag of Kazimierza County

Flag of Kędzierzyn-Koźle County

Flag of Kętrzyn County

Flag of Kielce County

Flag of Kłobuck County

Flag of Kłodzko County

Flag of Kluczbork County

Flag of Kolbuszowa County

Flag of Kolno County

Flag of Kołobrzeg County

Flag of Koło County

Flag of Końskie County

Flag of Kościan County

Flag of Kościerzyna County

Flag of Koszalin County

Flag of Kozienice County

Flag of Kraków County

Flag of Krapkowice County

Flag of Kraśnik County

Flag of Krasnystaw County

Flag of Krosno County

Flag of Krosno County

Flag of Krotoszyn County

Flag of Kutno County

Flag of Kwidzyn County

Flag of Łask County

Flag of Łańcut County

Flag of Lębork County

Flag of Łęczyca County

Flag of Łęczna County

Flag of Legionowo County

Flag of Legnica County

Flag of Leżajsk County

Flag of Limanowa County

Flag of Lipno County

Flag of Lipsko County

Flag of Łobez County

Flag of Łódź East County

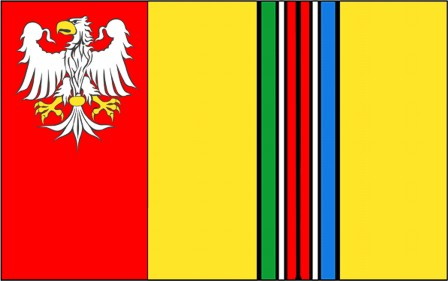
Flag of Łowicz County

Flag of Lubaczów County

Flag of Lubartów County

Flag of Lubań County

Flag of Lublin County

Flag of Lubin County

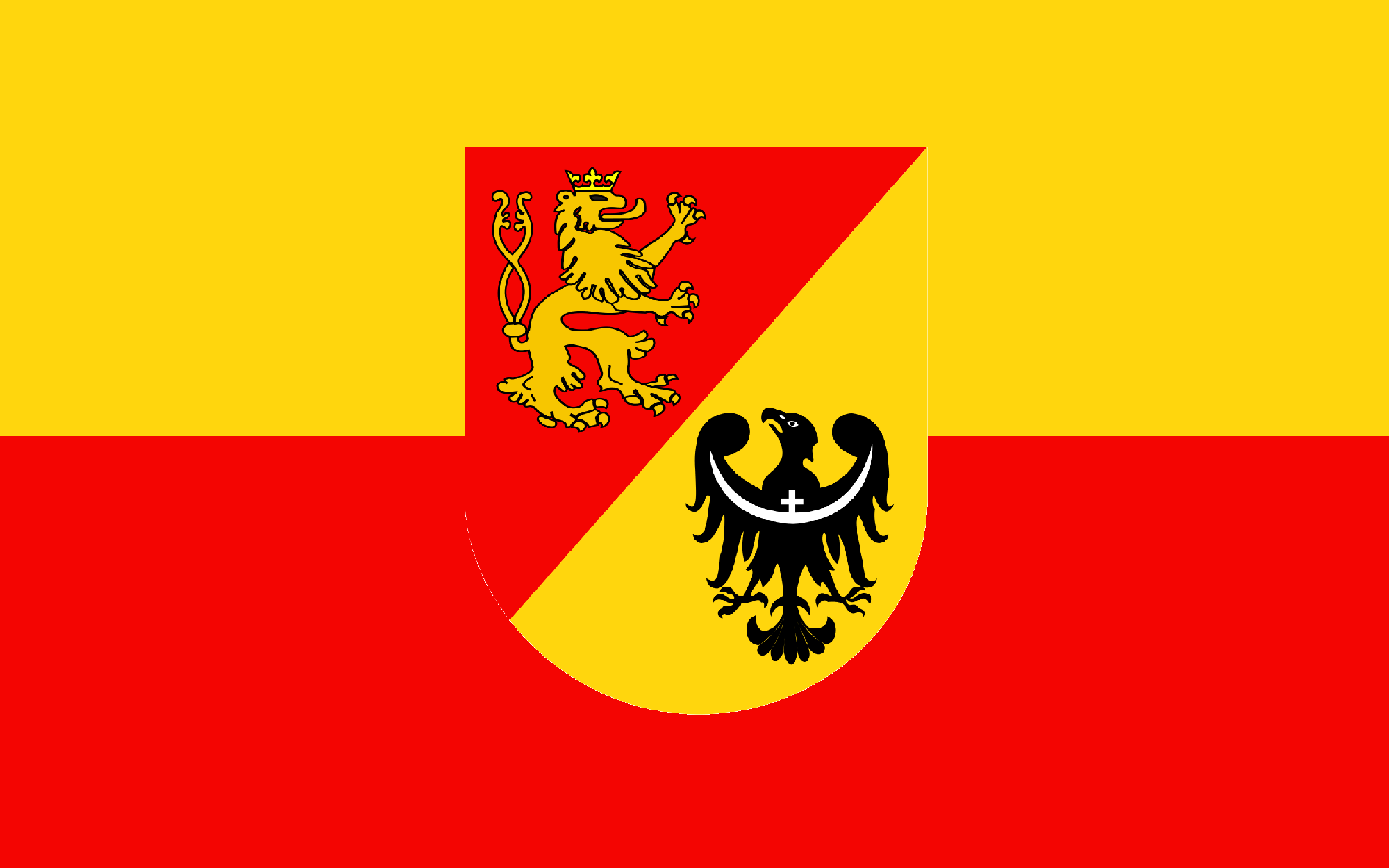
Flag of Lwówek County

Flag of Maków County

Flag of Malbork County

Flag of Międzychód County

Flag of Międzyrzecz County

Flag of Miechów County

Flag of Mielec County

Flag of Mikołów County

Flag of Milicz County

Flag of Mińsk County

Flag of Mława County

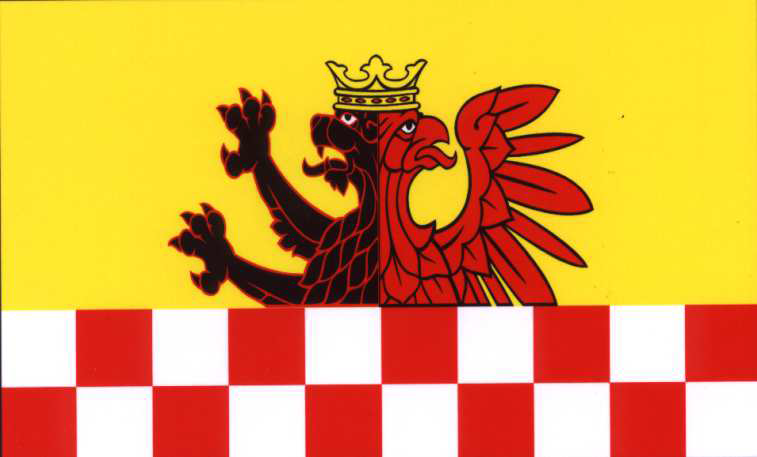
Flag of Mogilno County

Flag of Mońki County

Flag of Mrągowo County

Flag of Myślenice County

Flag of Myślibórz County

Flag of Myszków County

Flag of Nakło County

Flag of Namysłów County

Flag of Nidzica County

Flag of Nisko County

Flag of Nowy Dwór County, Pomeranian Voivodeship

Flag of Nowy Dwór County, Masovian Voivodeship

Flag of Nowy Sącz County

Flag of Nowa Sól County

Flag of Nowy Targ County

Flag of Nysa County

Flag of Oborniki County

Flag of Oława County

Flag of Olecko County

Flag of Oleśnica County

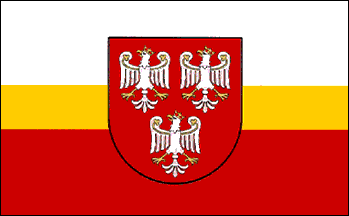
Flag of Olkusz County

Flag of Opoczno County

Flag of Opole County, Lublin Voivodeship

Flag of Opole County, Opole Voivodeship

Flag of Ostrowiec County

Flag of Ostrów County, Greater Poland Voivodeship

Flag of Ostrów County, Masovian Voivodeship

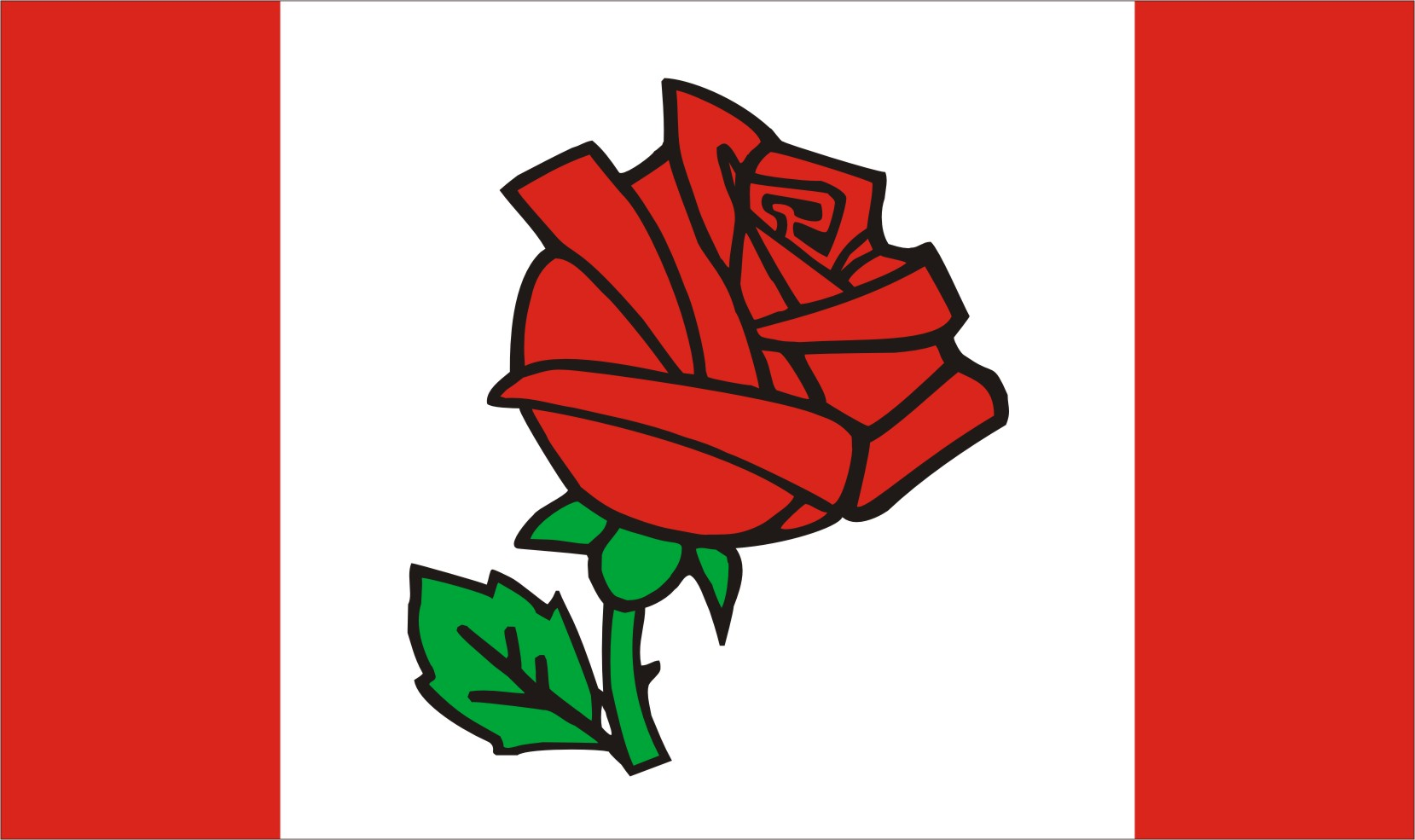
Flag of Ostróda County

Flag of Ostrzeszów County

Flag of Oświęcim County

Flag of Otwock County

Flag of Pabianice County

Flag of Pajęczno County

Flag of Parczew County

Flag of Piaseczno County

Flag of Piła County

Flag of Pińczów County

Flag of Piotrków County

Flag of Pisz County

Flag of Pleszew County

Flag of Płock County

Flag of Poddębice County

Flag of Police County

Flag of Polkowice County

Flag of Poznań County

Flag of Prudnik County

Flag of Pruszków County

Flag of Przasnysz County

Flag of Przemyśl County

Flag of Przeworsk County

Flag of Przysucha County

Flag of Pszczyna County

Flag of Puck County

Flag of Puławy County

Flag of Pułtusk County

Flag of Pyrzyce County

Flag of Racibórz County

Flag of Radomsko County

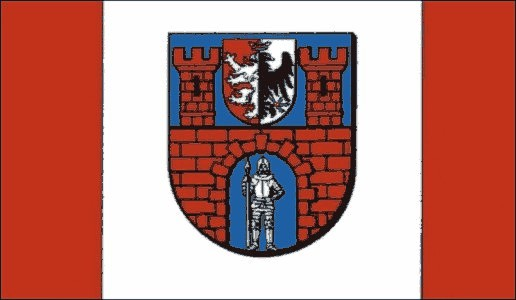
Flag of Radomsko County

Flag of Radziejów County

Flag of Radzyń County

Flag of Rawicz County

Flag of Rawa County

Flag of Ropczyce-Sędziszów County

Flag of Rybnik County

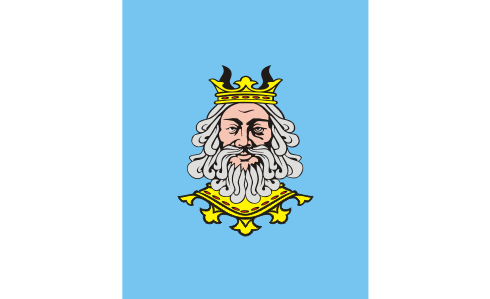
Flag of Rypin County

Flag of Rzeszów County

Flag of Sandomierz County

Flag of Sanok County

Flag of Sejny County

Flag of Sępólno County

Flag of Siedlce County

Flag of Siemiatycze County

Flag of Sieradz County

Flag of Skarżysko County

Flag of Sławno County

Flag of Słubice County

Flag of Słupca County

Flag of Słupsk County

Flag of Sochaczew County

Flag of Sokółka County

Flag of Środa County, Greater Poland Voivodeship

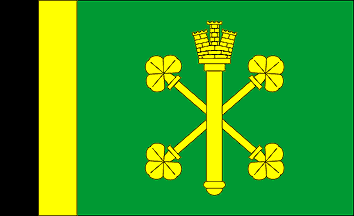
Flag of Środa County, Lower Silesian Voivodeship

Flag of Śrem County

Flag of Stalowa Wola County

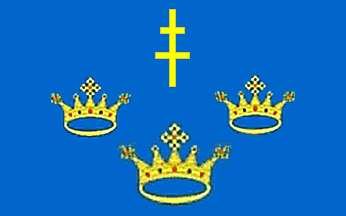
Flag of Starachowice County

Flag of Stargard County

Flag of Starogard County

Flag of Staszów County

Flag of Strzelce County

Flag of Strzelce-Drezdenko County

Flag of Strzelin County

Flag of Strzyżów County

Flag of Sulęcin County

Flag of Sucha County

Flag of Suwałki County

Flag of Świdnica County

Flag of Świdnik County

Flag of Świdwin County

Flag of Świebodzin County

Flag of Świecie County

Flag of Szamotuły County

Flag of Szczecinek County

Flag of Szczytno County

Flag of Sztum County

Flag of Szydłowiec County

Flag of Tarnobrzeg County

Flag of Tarnowskie Góry County

Flag of Tarnów County

Flag of Tatra County

Flag of Tczew County

Flag of Tomaszów County, Łódź Voivodeship

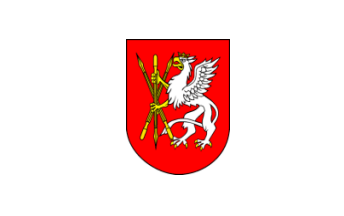
Flag of Tomaszów County, Lublin Voivodeship

Flag of Toruń County

Flag of Trzebnica County

Flag of Tuchola County

Flag of Turek County

Flag of Wąbrzeźno County

Flag of Wadowice County

Flag of Wągrowiec County

Flag of Wałbrzych County

Flag of Wałcz County

Flag of Warsaw West County

Flag of Węgorzewo County

Flag of Węgrów County

Flag of Wejherowo County

Flag of Wieliczka County

Flag of Wieluń County

Flag of Włocławek County

Flag of Włodawa County

Flag of Włoszczowa County

Flag of Wodzisław County

Flag of Wołów County

Flag of Wrocław County

Flag of Września County

Flag of Wschowa County

Flag of Wysokie Mazowieckie County

Flag of Wyszków County

Flag of Ząbkowice County

Flag of Żagań County

Flag of Zambrów County

Flag of Zamość County

Flag of Żary County

Flag of Zawiercie County

Flag of Zduńska Wola County

Flag of Zgierz County

Flag of Zgorzelec County

Flag of Zielona Góra County

Flag of Złotoryja County

Flag of Żnin County

Flag of Żuromin County

Flag of Żyrardów County

== See also ==
- List of Polish flags
- Coats of arms of Polish voivodeships
- Flag of Silesia and Lower Silesia
