= Voivodeships of Poland =

Highest-level administrative division of Poland

Voivodeships of Poland: Polish: Województwa Polski
- Also known as: provinces
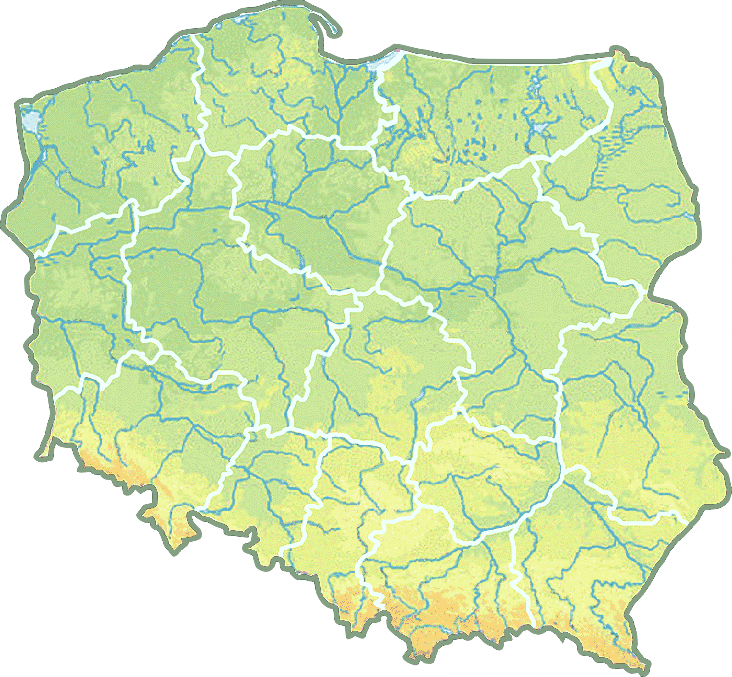
- Category: Provinces (unitary local government subdivision)
- Location: Republic of Poland
- Number: 16
- Populations: 926,842 (Opole) – 5,506,411 (Masovian)
- Areas: 9,413 km^{2} (3,634.2 mi^{2}) (Opole) – 35,580 km^{2} (13,737 mi^{2}) (Masovian)
- Government: Voivodeship government, National government
- Subdivisions: Powiat (county)

A voivodeship (/ˈvɔɪ.voʊd.ʃɪp/, VOY-vohd-ship), or voivodship (Polish: województwo [vɔjɛˈvut͡stfɔ]; plural: województwa [vɔjɛˈvut͡stfa]), is the highest-level administrative division of Poland, corresponding to a province in many other countries. The term has been in use since the 14th century and is commonly translated into English as "province".

The Polish local government reforms adopted in 1998, which went into effect on 1 January 1999, reduced the number of voivodeships to sixteen. These 16 replaced the 49 former voivodeships that had existed from 1 July 1975, and bear a greater resemblance (in territory, but not in name) to the voivodeships that existed between 1950 and 1975.

Today's voivodeships are mostly named after historical and geographical regions, while those prior to 1998 generally took their names from the cities on which they were centered. The new units range in area from under 10,000 km^{2} (3,900 sq mi) (Opole Voivodeship) to over 35,000 km^{2} (14,000 sq mi) (Masovian Voivodeship), and in population from under one million (Opole Voivodeship) to over five million (Masovian Voivodeship).

Administrative authority at the voivodeship level is shared between a government-appointed governor called a voivode (wojewoda), an elected assembly called a sejmik, and an executive board (zarząd województwa) chosen by that assembly, headed by a voivodeship marshal (marszałek województwa). Voivodeships are further divided into powiats ('counties') and gminas ('communes' or 'municipalities'), the smallest administrative divisions of Poland.

== Etymology and use ==
Some English-language sources, in historical contexts, speak of "palatinates" rather than "voivodeships". The term "palatinate" traces back to the Latin palatinus, which traces back to palatium ("palace").

More commonly used now is province or voivodeship. The latter is a loanword-calque hybrid formed on the Polish "województwo".

Some writers argue against rendering województwo in English as "province", on historical grounds: before the third, last Partition of the Polish–Lithuanian Commonwealth, in 1795, each of the main constituent regions of the Polish–Lithuanian Commonwealth—Greater Poland, Lesser Poland, Lithuania, and Royal Prussia—was sometimes idiosyncratically referred to as a "province" (prowincja). According to the argument, such a prowincja (for example, Greater Poland) cannot consist of a number of subdivisions ("województwa", the plural of "województwo") that are likewise called "provinces". This, however, is an antiquarian consideration, as the word "province" has not been used in Poland in this sense of a region for over two centuries; and those former larger political units, all now obsolete, can now be referred to in English as what they actually were: "regions".

The Polish województwo, designating a second-tier Polish or Polish–Lithuanian administrative unit, derives from wojewoda, (etymologically, a 'warlord', 'war leader' or 'leader of warriors', giving it the same etymology as the English word "Duchy", but now simply the governor of a województwo) and the suffix -ztwo (a "state or condition").

The English voivodeship, which is a hybrid of the loanword voivode and -ship (the latter a suffix that calques the Polish suffix -ztwo), has never been much used and is absent from many dictionaries. According to the Oxford English Dictionary, it first appeared in 1792, spelt "woiwodship", in the sense of "the district or province governed by a voivode." The word subsequently appeared in 1886 also in the sense of "the office or dignity of a voivode."

Poland's Commission on Standardization of Geographic Names outside the Republic of Poland prefers the form which omits the 'e', recommending the spelling "voivodship", for use in English.

== Current ==
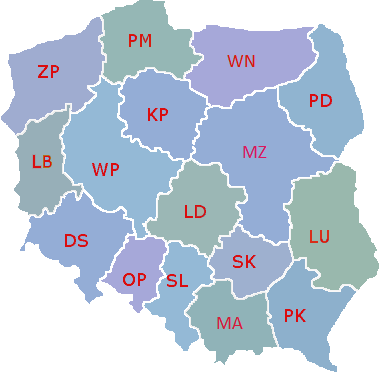
Map of Polish voivodeships since 1999 (abbreviated)

=== Administrative powers ===
Competences and powers at voivodeship level are shared between the voivode (governor), the sejmik (regional assembly) and the marshal. In most cases these institutions are all based in one city, but in Kuyavian-Pomeranian and Lubusz Voivodeship the voivode's offices are in a different city from those of the executive and the sejmik. Voivodeship capitals are listed in the table below.

The voivode is appointed by the Prime Minister and is the regional representative of the central government. The voivode acts as the head of central government institutions at regional level (such as the police and fire services, passport offices, and various inspectorates), manages central government property in the region, oversees the functioning of local government, coordinates actions in the field of public safety and environment protection, and exercises special powers in emergencies. The voivode's offices collectively are known as the urząd wojewódzki.

The sejmik is elected every five years. (The first of the five-year terms began in 2018; previous terms lasted four years.)) Elections for the sejmik fall at the same time as that of local authorities at powiat and gmina level. The sejmik passes by-laws, including the voivodeship's development strategies and budget. It also elects the marszałek and other members of the executive, and holds them to account.

The executive (zarząd województwa), headed by the marszałek drafts the budget and development strategies, implements the resolutions of the sejmik, manages the voivodeship's property, and deals with many aspects of regional policy, including management of European Union funding. The marshal's offices are collectively known as the urząd marszałkowski.

=== List ===
Polish voivodeships since 1999
Abbr.	Flag	Coat of arms	Ter. code	English name	Polish name	Capital city/cities	Area		Population (2025)	Density		Car plates
Abbr.	Flag	Coat of arms	Ter. code	English name	Polish name	Capital city/cities	km^{2}	sq mi	Population (2025)	per km^{2}	per sq mi	Car plates
DS			02	Lower Silesian	dolnośląskie	Wrocław	19,947	7,702	2,862,442	143.50	371.7	D, V
KP			04	Kuyavian–Pomeranian	kujawsko-pomorskie	Bydgoszcz^{1}, Toruń^{2}	17,971	6,939	1,977,537	110.04	285.0	C
LU			06	Lublin	lubelskie	Lublin	25,123	9,700	1,987,787	79.12	204.9	L
LB			08	Lubusz	lubuskie	Gorzów Wielkopolski^{1}, Zielona Góra^{2}	13,988	5,401	966,389	69.09	178.9	F
LD			10	Łódź	łódzkie	Łódź	18,219	7,034	2,336,680	128.26	332.2	E
MA			12	Lesser Poland	małopolskie	Kraków	15,183	5,862	3,427,656	225.76	584.7	K, J
MZ			14	Masovian	mazowieckie	Warsaw	35,559	13,729	5,506,411	154.85	401.1	W, A
OP			16	Opole	opolskie	Opole	9,412	3,634	926,482	98.47	255.0	O
PK			18	Subcarpathian	podkarpackie	Rzeszów	17,846	6,890	2,057,923	115.32	298.7	R, Y
PD			20	Podlaskie	podlaskie	Białystok	20,187	7,794	1,129,475	55.95	144.9	B
PM			22	Pomeranian	pomorskie	Gdańsk	18,323	7,075	2,358,779	128.73	333.4	G, X
SL			24	Silesian	śląskie	Katowice	12,333	4,762	4,275,429	346.67	897.9	S, I
SK			26	Holy Cross	świętokrzyskie	Kielce	11,710	4,520	1,152,544	98.42	254.9	T
WN			28	Warmian–Masurian	warmińsko-mazurskie	Olsztyn	24,173	9,333	1,343,915	55.60	144.0	N
WP			30	Greater Poland	wielkopolskie	Poznań	29,826	11,516	3,474,825	116.50	301.7	P, M
ZP			32	West Pomeranian	zachodniopomorskie	Szczecin	22,905	8,844	1,617,418	70.61	182.9	Z
^{1} Seat of voivode. ^{2} Seat of sejmik and marshal.

=== Economies ===
According to 2017 Eurostat data, the GDP per capita of Polish voivodeships varies notably and there is a large gap between the richest per capita voivodeship (being the Masovian Voivodeship at 33,500 EUR) and the poorest per capita (being the Lublin Voivodeship at 14,400 EUR).

== Historical development ==
Outline of Poland

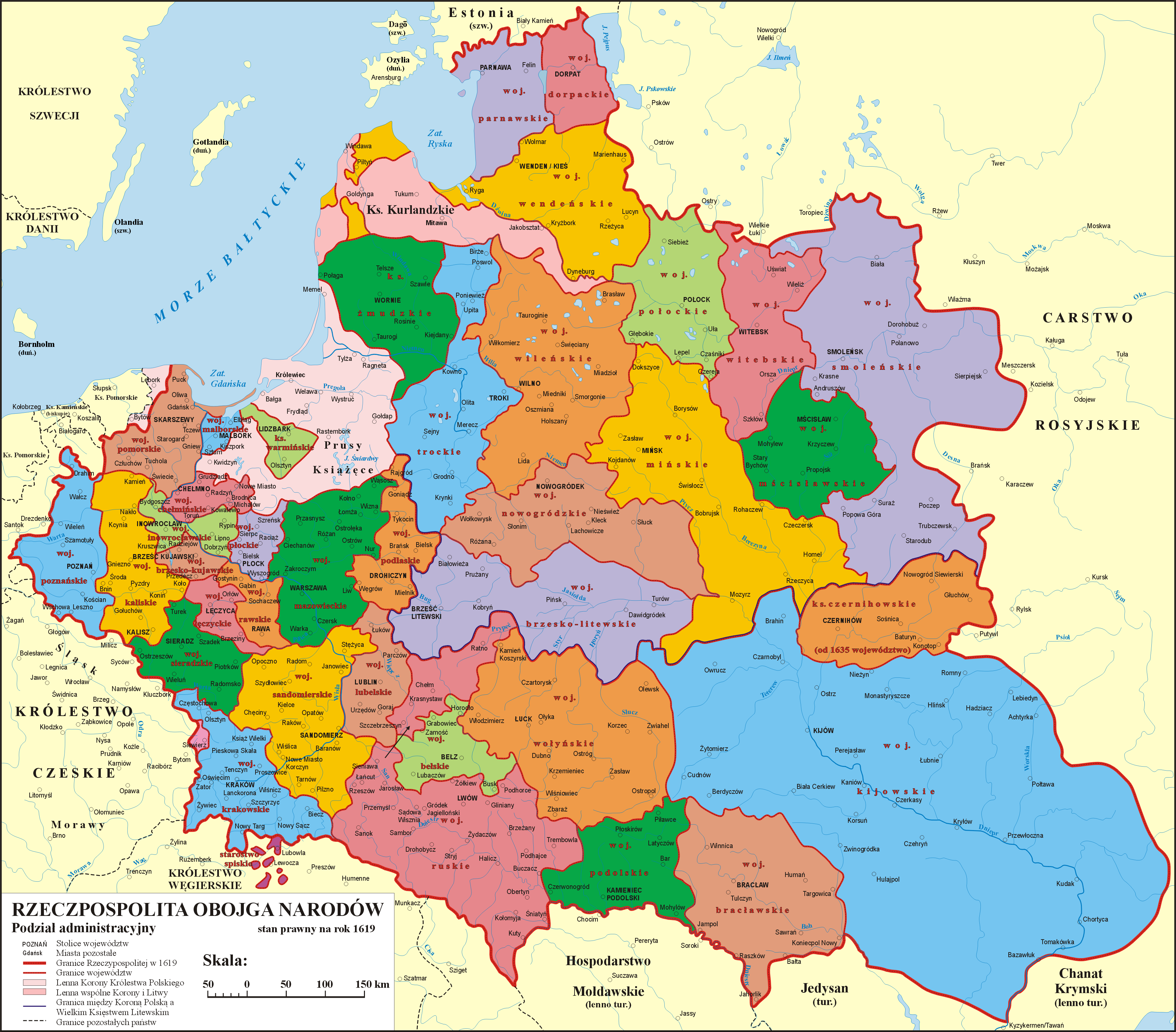
Polish–Lithuanian Commonwealth in 1619, around the time of the Commonwealth's greatest extent

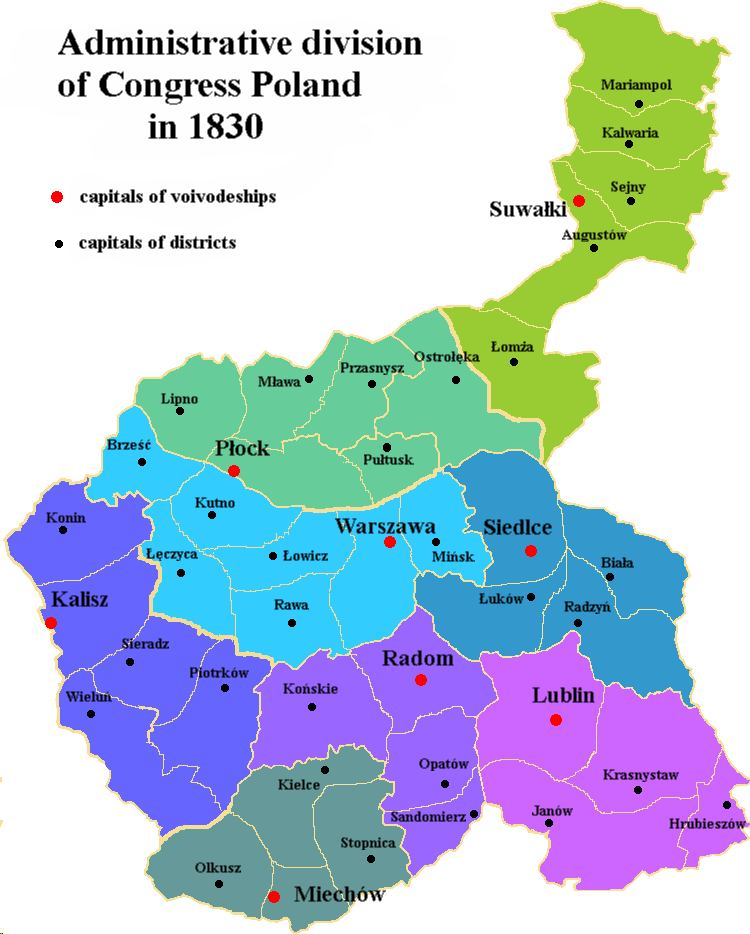
Voivodeships of Congress Poland

Map of Polish voivodeships (1921–1939)

Poland's prewar and postwar borders, 1939–1945

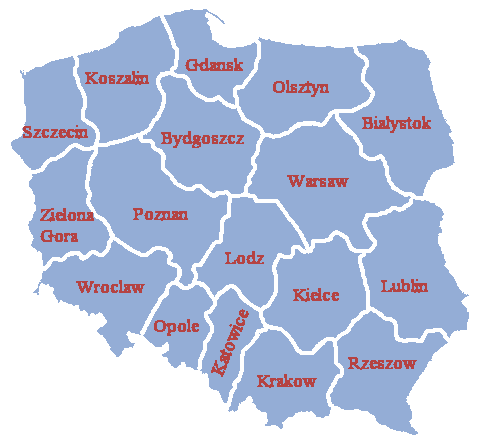
Map of Polish voivodeships (1957–1975)

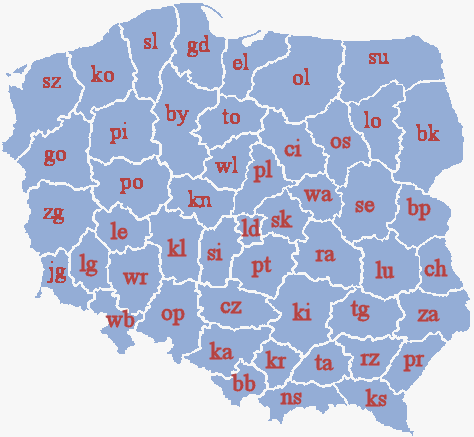
Map of Polish voivodeships (1975–1998)

=== Polish–Lithuanian Commonwealth ===
==== Greater Poland Province (Prowincja wielkopolska) ====
The following is a list of the Voivodeships within Greater Poland Province at various points over the period from the mid-16th century until the late 18th century:

- Poznań Voivodeship (województwo poznańskie, Poznań)
- Kalisz Voivodeship (województwo kaliskie, Kalisz)
- Gniezno Voivodeship (województwo gnieźnieńskie, Gniezno) from 1768
- Sieradz Voivodeship (województwo sieradzkie, Sieradz)
- Łęczyca Voivodeship (województwo łęczyckie, Łęczyca)
- Brześć Kujawski Voivodeship (województwo brzesko-kujawskie, Brześć Kujawski)
- Inowrocław Voivodeship (województwo inowrocławskie, Inowrocław)
- Chełmno Voivodeship (województwo chełmińskie, Chełmno)
- Malbork Voivodeship (województwo malborskie, Malbork)
- Pomeranian Voivodeship (województwo pomorskie, Gdańsk)
- Duchy of Warmia (Księstwo Warmińskie, Lidzbark Warmiński)
- Duchy of Prussia (Księstwo Pruskie, Królewiec)
- Płock Voivodeship (województwo płockie, Płock)
- Rawa Voivodeship (województwo rawskie, Rawa Mazowiecka)
- Masovian Voivodeship (województwo mazowieckie, Warszawa)

==== Lesser Poland Province (Prowincja małopolska) ====
The following is a list of the Voivodeships within Lesser Poland Province over the period of the mid-16th century until the late 18th century:

- Kraków Voivodeship (województwo krakowskie, Kraków)
- Sandomierz Voivodeship (województwo sandomierskie, Sandomierz)
- Lublin Voivodeship (województwo lubelskie, Lublin)
- Podlaskie Voivodeship (województwo podlaskie, Drohiczyn)
- Ruthenian Voivodeship (województwo ruskie, Lwów [today Lviv, Ukraine])
- Belz Voivodeship (województwo belzkie, Bełz [Belz, Ukraine])
- Volhynian Voivodeship (województwo wołyńskie, Łuck [Lutsk, Ukraine])
- Podole Voivodeship (województwo podolskie, Kamieniec Podolski [Kamianets-Podilskyi, Ukraine])
- Bracław Voivodeship (województwo bracławskie, Bracław [Bratslav, Ukraine])
- Kijów Voivodeship (województwo kijowskie, Kijów [Kyiv, Ukraine, or Kiev])
- Czernihów Voivodeship (województwo czernichowskie, Czernihów [Chernihiv, Ukraine])

==== Lithuanian Province (Grand Duchy of Lithuania) ====
Voivodeships of the Grand Duchy of Lithuania during the Polish–Lithuanian Commonwealth were based on the administrative structure that existed in the Duchy prior to the Commonwealth's formation, from at least the early-15th century. They were:

- Wilno Voivodship (województwo wileńskie, Wilno [Vilnius, Lithuania])1413
- Troki Voivodship (województwo trockie, Troki [Trakai, Lithuania])
- Nowogrodek Voivodship (województwo nowogrodzkie, Nowogródek [Novogrudok, Belarus])
- Brest-Litovsk Voivodship (województwo brzesko-litewskie, Brześć Litewski [Brest, Belarus])
- Minsk Voivodship (województwo mińskie, Mińsk [Minsk, Belarus])
- Mscislaw Voivodship (województwo mścisławskie, Mścisław [Mstsislaw, Belarus])
- Smolensk Voivodship (województwo smoleńskie, Smoleńsk [Smolensk, Russia])
- Vitebsk Voivodship (województwo witebskie, Witebsk [Vitebsk, Belarus])
- Polock Voivodship (województwo połockie, Połock [Polotsk, Belarus])
- Duchy of Samogita (księstwo żmudzkie, Miedniki-Wornie [Varniai, Lithuania])

==== Duchy of Livonia ====
While the Duchy of Livonia was part of the Polish–Lithuanian Commonwealth, approximately 1569–1772, in various periods it comprised the following voivodeships in varying combinations:

- Wenden Voivodship (województwo wendeńskie, Wenden [Cēsis, Latvia]) from 1598 until the 1620s
- Dorpat Voivodship (województwo dorpackie, Dorpat [Tartu, Estonia]) from 1598 until the 1620s
- Parnawa Voivodship (województwo parnawskie, Parnava [Pärnu, Estonia]) from 1598 until the 1620s
- Inflanty Voivodeship (województwo inflanckie Dyneburg [Daugavpils, Latvia]) from the 1620s
- Duchy of Courland and Semigalia (księstwo Kurlandii i Semigalii), Mitawa [Jelgava, Latvia])

=== Congress Poland ===
From 1816 to 1837 there were 8 voivodeships in Congress Poland.

- Augustów Voivodeship
- Kalisz Voivodeship
- Kraków Voivodeship
- Lublin Voivodeship
- Mazowsze Voivodeship
- Płock Voivodeship
- Podlaskie Voivodeship
- Sandomierz Voivodeship

=== Second Polish Republic ===
The administrative division of Poland in the interwar period included 16 voivodeships and Warsaw (with voivodeship rights). The voivodeships that remained in Poland after World War II as a result of Polish–Soviet border agreement of August 1945 were very similar to the current voivodeships.

Collapsed list of car registration plates from 1937, please use table-sort buttons.

Car plates (from 1937)	Voivodeship	Polish name	Capital city modern name in parentheses	Area in km^{2} (1930)	Population (1931)
20–24	Białystok	białostockie	Białystok	26,000	1,263,300
25–29	Kielce	kieleckie	Kielce	22,200	2,671,000
30–34	Kraków	krakowskie	Kraków	17,600	2,300,100
35–39	Lublin	lubelskie	Lublin	26,600	2,116,200
40–44	Lwów	lwowskie	Lwów (Lviv)	28,400	3,126,300
45–49	Łódź	łódzkie	Łódź	20,400	2,650,100
50–54	Nowogródek	nowogródzkie	Nowogródek (Navahrudak)	23,000	1,057,200
55–59	Polesie	poleskie	Brześć nad Bugiem (Brest)	36,700	1,132,200
60–64	Pomeranian	pomorskie	Toruń	25,700	1,884,400
65–69	Poznań	poznańskie	Poznań	28,100	2,339,600
70–74	Stanisławów	stanisławowskie	Stanisławów (Ivano-Frankivsk)	16,900	1,480,300
75–79?	Silesian	śląskie	Katowice	5,100	1,533,500
80–84	Tarnopol	tarnopolskie	Tarnopol (Ternopil)	16,500	1,600,400
85–89	Warsaw (voivodeship)	warszawskie	Warsaw	31,700	2,460,900
00–19	Warsaw (city)	Warszawa	Warsaw	140	1,179,500
90–94	Wilno	wileńskie	Wilno (Vilnius)	29,000	1,276,000
95–99	Wołyń	wołyńskie	Łuck (Lutsk)	35,700	2,085,600

=== Polish People's Republic ===
After World War II, the new administrative division of the country within the new national borders was based on the prewar one and included 14 (+2) voivodeships, then 17 (+5). The voivodeships in the east that had not been annexed by the Soviet Union had their borders left almost unchanged. The newly acquired territories in the west and north were organized into the new voivodeships of Szczecin, Wrocław and Olsztyn, and partly joined to Gdańsk, Katowice and Poznań voivodeships. Two cities were granted voivodeship status: Warsaw and Łódź.

In 1950, new voivodeships were created: Koszalin (previously part of Szczecin), Opole (previously part of Katowice), and Zielona Góra (previously part of Poznań, Wrocław and Szczecin voivodeships). In 1957, three more cities were granted voivodeship status: Wrocław, Kraków and Poznań.

Collapsed list of car registration plates from 1956 – please use table-sort buttons

Car plates (from 1956)	Voivodeship (Polish name)	Capital	Area in km^{2} (1965)	Population (1965)
A	białostockie	Białystok	23,136	1,160,400
B	bydgoskie	Bydgoszcz	20,794	1,837,100
G	gdańskie	Gdańsk	10,984	1,352,800
S	katowickie	Katowice	9,518	3,524,300
C	kieleckie	Kielce	19,498	1,899,100
E	koszalińskie^{1}	Koszalin	17,974	755,100
K	krakowskie	Kraków	15,350	2,127,600
?	Kraków (city)^{2}	Kraków	230	520,100
F	łódzkie	Łódź	17,064	1,665,200
I	Łódź (city)	Łódź	214	744,100
L	lubelskie	Lublin	24,829	1,900,500
O	olsztyńskie	Olsztyn	20,994	956,600
H	opolskie ¹	Opole	9,506	1,009,200
P	poznańskie	Poznań	26,723	2,126,300
?	Poznań (city)^{2}	Poznań	220	438,200
R	rzeszowskie	Rzeszów	18,658	1,692,800
M	szczecińskie	Szczecin	12,677	847,600
T	warszawskie: (the city of Warsaw was granted voivodeship status 1945-1975)	Warsaw	29,369	2,453,000
W	Warszawa (city)	Warsaw	446	1,252,600
X	wrocławskie	Wrocław	18,827	1,967,000
?	Wrocław (city)^{2}	Wrocław	225	474,200
Z	zielonogórskie^{1}	Zielona Góra	14,514	847,200
^{1} New voivodeships created in 1950. ^{2} Cities separated in 1957.

Poland's voivodeships 1975–1998

Administrative division of Poland between 1979 and 1998 included 49 voivodeships upheld after the establishment of the Third Polish Republic in 1989 for another decade. This reorganisation of the administrative division of Poland was mainly a result of the local government reform acts of 1973–1975. In place of the three-level administrative division (voivodeship, county, commune), a new two-level administrative division was introduced (49 small voivodeships, and communes). The three smallest voivodeships—Warsaw, Kraków and Łódź—had the special status of municipal voivodeship; the city president (mayor) was also provincial governor.

Collapsed list of Voivodeships: 1975–1998, please use table-sort buttons.

Abbr.	Voivodeship	Polish name	Capital	Area km^{2} (1998)	Population (1980)	No. of cities	No. of communes
bp	Biała Podlaska Voivodeship	bialskopodlaskie	Biała Podlaska	5,348	286,400	6	35
bk	Białystok Voivodeship	białostockie	Białystok	10,055	641,100	17	49
bb	Bielsko-Biała Voivodeship	bielskie	Bielsko-Biała	3,704	829,900	18	47
by	Bydgoszcz Voivodeship	bydgoskie	Bydgoszcz	10,349	1,036,000	27	55
ch	Chełm Voivodeship	chełmskie	Chełm	3,865	230,900	4	25
ci	Ciechanów Voivodeship	ciechanowskie	Ciechanów	6,362	405,400	9	45
cz	Częstochowa Voivodeship	częstochowskie	Częstochowa	6,182	747,900	17	49
el	Elbląg Voivodeship	elbląskie	Elbląg	6,103	441,500	15	37
gd	Gdańsk Voivodeship	gdańskie	Gdańsk	7,394	1,333,800	19	43
go	Gorzów Voivodeship	gorzowskie	Gorzów Wielkopolski	8,484	455,400	21	38
jg	Jelenia Góra Voivodeship	jeleniogórskie	Jelenia Góra	4,378	492,600	24	28
kl	Kalisz Voivodeship	kaliskie	Kalisz	6,512	668,000	20	53
ka	Katowice Voivodeship	katowickie	Katowice	6,650	3,733,900	43	46
ki	Kielce Voivodeship	kieleckie	Kielce	9,211	1,068,700	17	69
kn	Konin Voivodeship	konińskie	Konin	5,139	441,200	18	43
ko	Koszalin Voivodeship	koszalińskie	Koszalin	8,470	462,200	17	35
kr	Kraków Voivodeship	krakowskie	Kraków	3,254	1,167,500	10	38
ks	Krosno Voivodeship	krośnieńskie	Krosno	5,702	448,200	12	37
lg	Legnica Voivodeship	legnickie	Legnica	4,037	458,900	11	31
le	Leszno Voivodeship	leszczyńskie	Leszno	4,254	357,600	19	28
lu	Lublin Voivodeship	lubelskie	Lublin	6,793	935,200	16	62
lo	Łomża Voivodeship	łomżyńskie	Łomża	6,684	325,800	12	39
ld	Łódź Voivodeship	łódzkie	Łódź	1523	1,127,800	8	11
ns	Nowy Sącz Voivodeship	nowosądeckie	Nowy Sącz	5,576	628,800	14	41
ol	Olsztyn Voivodeship	olsztyńskie	Olsztyn	12,327	681,400	21	48
op	Opole Voivodeship	opolskie	Opole	8,535	975,000	29	61
os	Ostrołęka Voivodeship	ostrołęckie	Ostrołęka	6,498	371,400	9	38
pi	Piła Voivodeship	pilskie	Piła	8,205	437,100	24	35
pt	Piotrków Voivodeship	piotrkowskie	Piotrków Trybunalski	6,266	604,200	10	51
pl	Płock Voivodeship	płockie	Płock	5,117	496,100	9	44
po	Poznań Voivodeship	poznańskie	Poznań	8,151	1,237,800	33	57
pr	Przemyśl Voivodeship	przemyskie	Przemyśl	4,437	380,000	9	35
ra	Radom Voivodeship	radomskie	Radom	7,295	702,300	15	61
rz	Rzeszów Voivodeship	rzeszowskie	Rzeszów	4,397	648,900	13	41
se	Siedlce Voivodeship	siedleckie	Siedlce	8,499	616,300	12	66
si	Sieradz Voivodeship	sieradzkie	Sieradz	4,869	392,300	9	40
sk	Skierniewice Voivodeship	skierniewickie	Skierniewice	3,959	396,900	8	36
sl	Słupsk Voivodeship	słupskie	Słupsk	7,453	369,800	11	31
su	Suwałki Voivodeship	suwalskie	Suwałki	10,490	422,600	14	42
sz	Szczecin Voivodeship	szczecińskie	Szczecin	9,981	897,900	29	50
tg	Tarnobrzeg Voivodeship	tarnobrzeskie	Tarnobrzeg	6,283	556,300	14	46
ta	Tarnów Voivodeship	tarnowskie	Tarnów	4,151	607,000	9	41
to	Toruń Voivodeship	toruńskie	Toruń	5,348	610,800	13	41
wb	Wałbrzych Voivodeship	wałbrzyskie	Wałbrzych	4,168	716,100	31	30
wa	Warsaw Voivodeship	warszawskie	Warsaw (Warszawa)	3,788	2,319,100	27	32
wl	Włocławek Voivodeship	włocławskie	Włocławek	4,402	413,400	14	30
wr	Wrocław Voivodeship	wrocławskie	Wrocław	6,287	1,076,200	16	33
za	Zamość Voivodeship	zamojskie	Zamość	6,980	472,100	5	47
zg	Zielona Góra Voivodeship	zielonogórskie	Zielona Góra	8,868	609,200	26	50

== See also ==
- Armorial of Poland
- Flags of Polish voivodeships
- ISO 3166-2:PL
- List of Polish voivodeships by GRP
- Prowincja, provinces in Poland
- Polish historical regions
