= Aleksandr Golovachev =

Red army colonel

- Александр Алексеевич Головачёв
- Born: 10 December [O.S. 27 November] 1909; Lyubokhna, Russian Empire
- Died: 6 March 1945 (aged 35) near Logau, Silesia, Germany
- Military career
- Allegiance: Soviet Union
- Branch: Red Army
- Service years: 1929–1945
- Rank: Colonel
- Commands: 52nd Motor Rifle Brigade (became 23rd Guards Motor Rifle Brigade)
- Conflicts: World War II; Winter War; Eastern Front †
- Awards: Hero of the Soviet Union (2x)

Aleksandr Alekseyevich Golovachev (Russian: Александр Алексеевич Головачёв; 10 December [O.S. 27 November] 1909 – 6 March 1945) was a Red Army colonel twice awarded the title Hero of the Soviet Union for his leadership of the 23rd Guards Motor Rifle Brigade of the 7th Guards Tank Corps of the Red Army during the World War II.

Golovachev joined the Red Army in the late 1920s and rose to infantry company commander before he was arrested during the Great Purge, but was released due to lack of evidence. After fighting in the Winter War as a battalion commander, Golovachev became a regimental chief of staff before the beginning of Operation Barbarossa. His unit was destroyed in the first weeks of the war in the Uman pocket, and Golovachev led its remnants for several months behind German lines before joining a partisan detachment in late 1941.

He returned to Soviet lines in early 1942 and became a regimental commander before being appointed commander of the 52nd Motor Rifle Brigade in September 1942. Golovachev led the brigade in the Third Battle of Kharkov, during which it suffered heavy losses and was encircled. Decorated for his actions in the breakout, Golovachev continued to command the brigade, which became the 23rd Guards Motor Rifle Brigade for its actions in Operation Kutuzov. He was made a Hero of the Soviet Union twice for his leadership of the brigade in the Lvov–Sandomierz Offensive and the Sandomierz–Silesian Offensive. His second award proved posthumous, as he was killed in early March 1945.

== Early life and prewar service ==
Golovachev was born to a working-class family on 25 December 1909 in the settlement of Lyubokhna, Bryansky Uyezd, Oryol Governorate. He joined the Red Army in September 1929 and was sent to study at the Combined Military School in Moscow, from which he graduated in 1932. In March of that year, Golovachev was appointed a platoon commander in the 2nd Rifle Regiment of the Moscow Proletarian Rifle Division. In June 1933 he transferred to the 25th Separate Territorial Rifle Battalion of the 9th Rifle Regiment of the Moscow Military District in Kirsanov, serving as an air defense platoon commander before transferring to serve in the same position with the machine gun company of the battalion. From January 1935 he served with the 57th Rifle Regiment of the 19th Rifle Division in Ostrogozhsk as a company commander and battalion chief of staff. During the Great Purge, Golovachev was transferred to the reserve in June 1937 and arrested by the NKVD on 31 July.

He was released in October 1938 due to lack of evidence, and in February 1939 reinstated in the Red Army, returning to his previous position as a company commander in the 57th Regiment. From June of that year he again served as a battalion chief of staff. Golovachev participated in the Soviet invasion of Poland in September and was appointed a battalion commander of the 744th Rifle Regiment of the 149th Rifle Division in November. In January 1940 he became commander of a battalion of the 25th Rifle Regiment of the 44th Rifle Division of the Leningrad Military District, fighting in the Winter War. In March 1941, Golovachev was appointed commander of the 4th Separate Reconnaissance Battalion of the 44th, which was converted into a mountain rifle division, and in May he transferred to serve as chief of staff of its 146th Mountain Rifle Regiment.

== World War II ==
After the beginning of Operation Barbarossa, Golavachev fought with his unit in the border battles and in fighting south of Stanislav he was seriously wounded on 27 June. In the second half of July, his unit was encircled in the Uman pocket and destroyed. Golovachev escaped the pocket and made his way northeast, and by 6 November, with a group of 74 personnel, he reached the Bryansk area, where he joined a partisan detachment operating in Lyubokhny District, near his birthplace. He became chief of staff of the detachment, which was contacted by a representative from the 10th Army in January 1942, who ordered the military personnel of the detachment to cross the front line and rejoin the army. After being treated at a hospital, Golovachev became commander of the 1326th Rifle Regiment of the 415th Rifle Division of the Western Front in February 1942, fighting in battles west of Medyn. Appointed commander of the 52nd Motor Rifle Brigade in September, Golovachev led the brigade on the Southwestern Front after it finished forming. The brigade joined the 15th Tank Corps on 15 December and participated in the offensive towards Olkhovatka. During the Third Battle of Kharkov in late February, the brigade was surrounded and escaped encirclement in small groups. Golovachev was one of the last to leave with the battle flag of the brigade, after which the brigade was rebuilt. For his actions, he was awarded the Order of Suvorov, 2nd class, on 31 March 1943.

The brigade and its corps were sent to the Bryansk Front in mid-July for Operation Kutuzov. For combat successes, the brigade became the 23rd Guards Motor Rifle Brigade on 27 July 1943 while the corps became the 7th Guards Tank Corps and Golovachev, promoted to colonel on 11 July, received the Order of the Red Banner. The corps was relocated to the Voronezh Front (the 1st Ukrainian Front from 20 October) in September and fought in the Battle of Kiev, the Zhitomir–Berdichev Offensive, and the Proskurov–Chernovitsy Offensive. For the capture of Vasilkov, the brigade received the name of the city as an honorific. For his actions during this period, Golovachev was awarded the Order of the Red Banner on 3 January and second Order of Suvorov, 2nd class, on 10 January.

Golovachev led the brigade in the Lvov–Sandomierz Offensive in July, during which it captured Gorodok, crossed the Vistula, and captured a bridgehead on the western bank of the river. In the fighting to expand the bridgehead with relatively little artillery support, Golovachev continued the attack and quickly reached a line south of Szydłów. Subsequently, he moved his motor rifle brigade to rejoin the tank brigades of the corps west of Opatów, and in a night march east of Opatów approached the Opatówka river and together with the tank brigades reached Stadoly, where for four days they fought against the advancing German 17th Panzer Division, preventing the latter from relieving the German troops encircled at Sandomierz. For his "skillful leadership" of the brigade, Golovachev was given the title Hero of the Soviet Union and awarded the Order of Lenin on 23 September.

From January 1945, the 23rd Guards fought in the Sandomierz–Silesian Offensive and the Lower Silesian Offensive, during which it captured Częstochowa, Pitschen, and Bunzlau, crossed the Oder, and captured a bridgehead on the west bank of the river. Golovachev was killed in action on 6 March during fighting near the village of Logau, east of Lauban. His body was sent to Vasilkov for burial. A month later, he was posthumously made a Hero of the Soviet Union a second time for his leadership of the brigade in the Sandomierz–Silesian Offensive.

== Personal life ==
Golovachev married Nina Mikhailovna and had two sons, Vladimir and Yury. His family was evacuated to Sverdlovsk during the war, where Yury, whom Golovachev never saw, died aged two of malnutrition. Vladimir became an academic postwar.

== Awards and decorations ==
Golovachev was awarded the following decorations:

- Hero of the Soviet Union (2)
- Order of Lenin
- Order of the Red Banner (3)
- Order of Suvorov, 2nd class (2)
- Order of the Red Star
