= Statue of Hans Joachim von Zieten =

Statue in Berlin, Germany

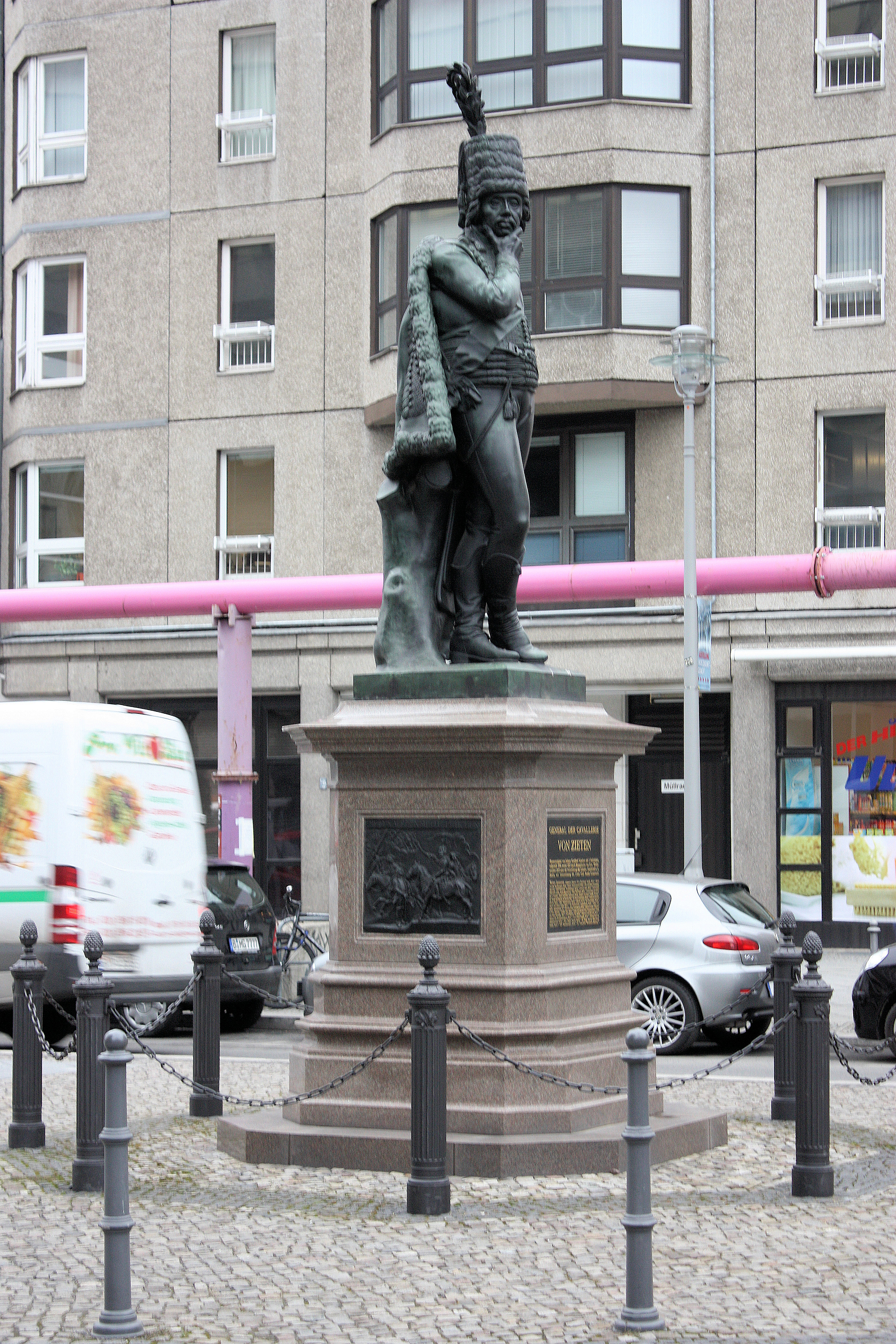
- The sculpture in 2013
- Artist: Johann Gottfried Schadow
- Medium: Bronze sculpture
- Subject: Hans Joachim von Zieten
- Location: Berlin, Germany

The statue of Hans Joachim von Zieten is a bronze sculpture installed at Wilhelmplatz in Berlin, Germany.

== See also ==
- Statue of Leopold I, Prince of Anhalt-Dessau
