= Henryków Lubański =

- Village
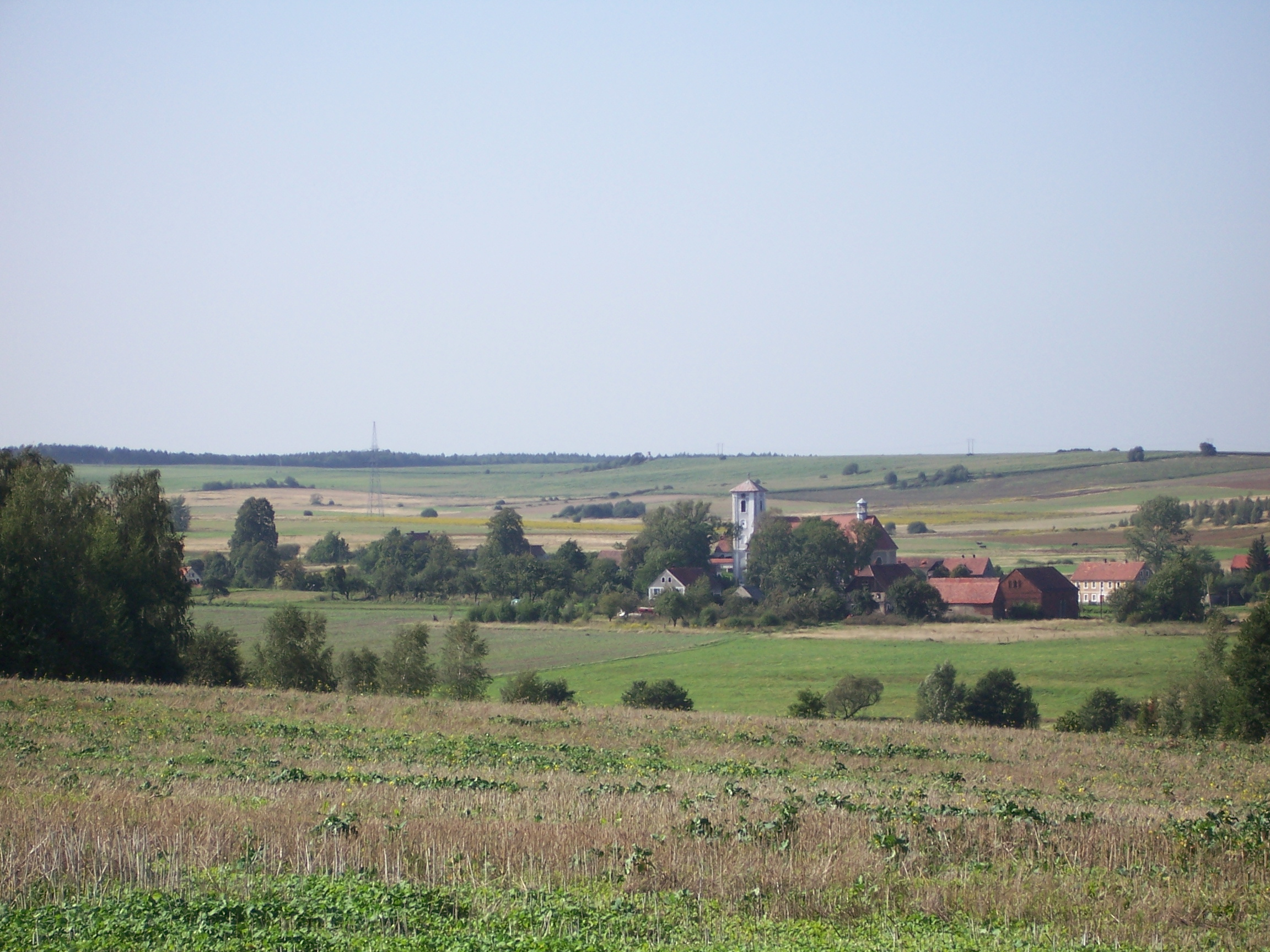

- Location within Poland
- Coordinates: 51°10′N 15°16′E
- Country: Poland
- Voivodeship: Lower Silesian
- County: Lubań
- Gmina: Lubań
- Population: 850
- Time zone: UTC+1 (CET)
  - Summer (DST): UTC+2 (CEST)
- Vehicle registration: DLB

Henryków Lubański [xɛnˈrɨkuf luˈbaɲski] (German: Katholisch Hennersdorf) is a village in the administrative district of Gmina Lubań, within Lubań County, Lower Silesian Voivodeship, in south-western Poland.

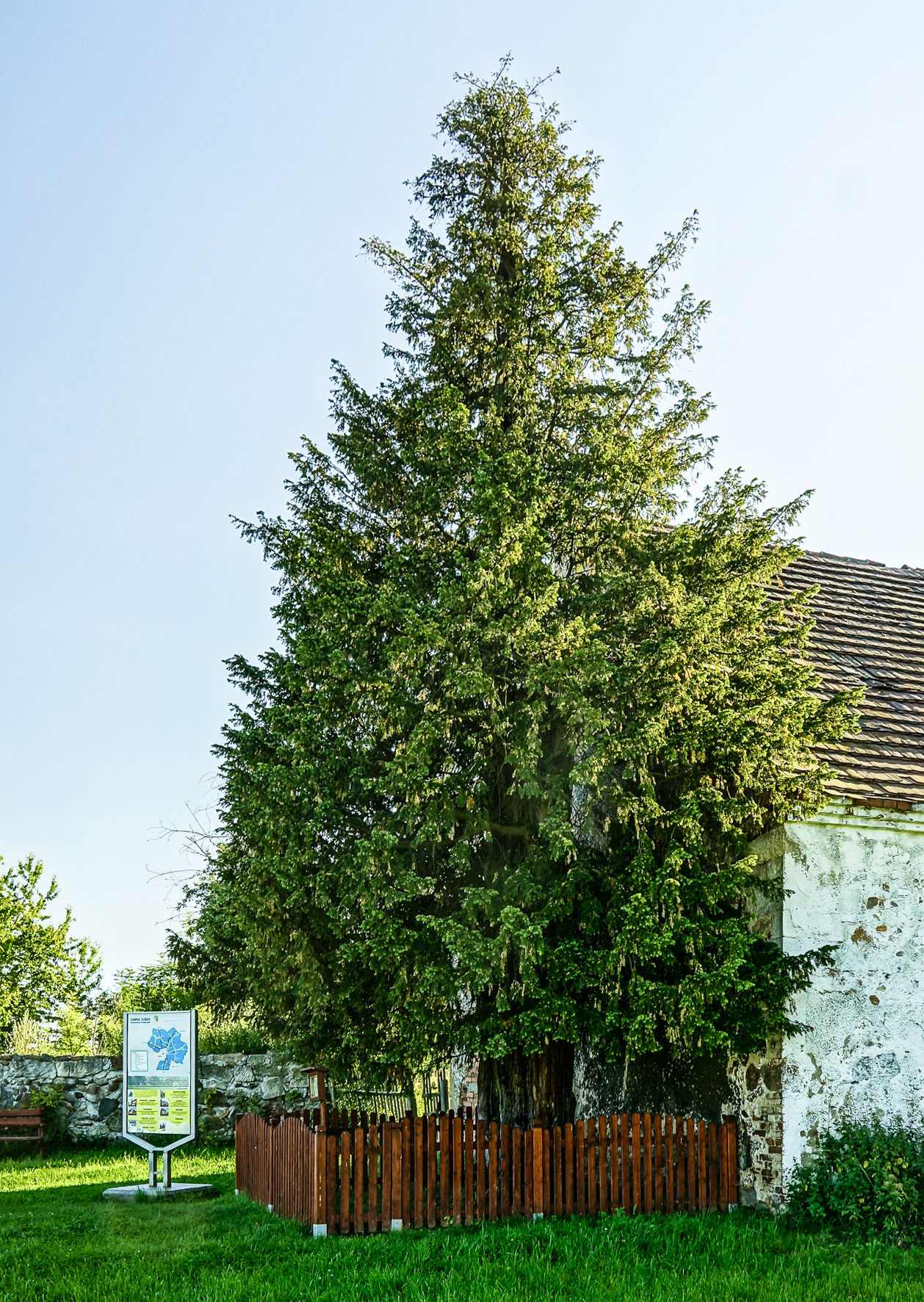
Henryków yew

The village contains Poland's oldest tree – a 1260-year-old yew, which is listed as a natural monument.

Historically considered a part of Upper Lusatia, although more closely associated with Lower Silesia in the early 14th century and from 1815.

The St. Nicholas Church is a stop on the Lower Silesian route of the Way of St. James.

== History ==
In the Middle Ages, the area was at various times part of Poland, Bohemia (Czechia) and Hungary. The village itself was probably established in the 12th or 13th century. It was a possession of the Magdalene Abbey from nearby Lubań. The local church was mentioned in documents in 1346. The village remained Catholic, when the region turned Protestant in the early 16th century and even after Lusatia passed to Saxony by the 1635 Peace of Prague. From 1697, it was ruled by Polish kings in personal union. In 1745, the village was the site of the Battle of Hennersdorf between the Prussian Army under General Hans Joachim von Zieten and a Saxon contingent in the War of the Austrian Succession. In 1815, it was annexed by Prussia, and in 1871 it also became part of Germany. In the final stages of World War II, on February 13, 1945, the Germans ordered a total evacuation of the local population. On February 22, 1945, the village was captured by Soviet troops. Following Germany's defeat, it became again part of Poland, although with a Soviet-installed communist regime, which stayed in power until the Fall of Communism in the 1980s.
