= Nawojów Śląski =

- Village
- Location within Poland
- Coordinates: 51°09′40″N 15°19′36″E
- Country: Poland
- Voivodeship: Lower Silesian
- County: Lubań
- Gmina: Lubań

Nawojów Śląski (Polish pronunciation: [naˈvɔjuf ˈɕlɔ̃skʲi]) (German: Schlesisch Haugsdorf) is a village in the administrative district of Gmina Lubań, within Lubań County, Lower Silesian Voivodeship, in south-western Poland.
