= Radostów Średni =

- Village
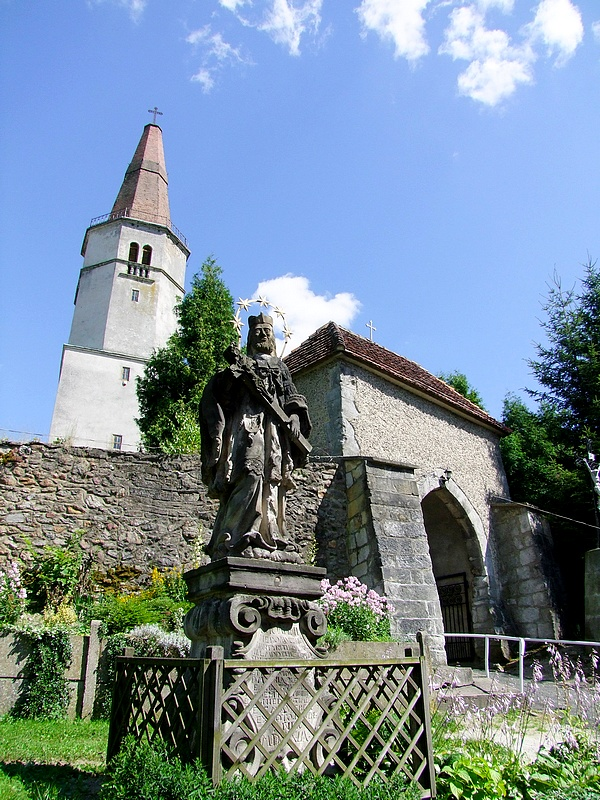
- Catholic church

- Location within Poland
- Coordinates: 51°07′15″N 15°21′52″E
- Country: Poland
- Voivodeship: Lower Silesian
- County: Lubań
- Gmina: Lubań

Radostów Średni (Polish pronunciation: [raˈdɔstuf ˈɕrɛdɲi]) (German: Mittel Thiemendorf) is a village in the administrative district of Gmina Lubań, within Lubań County, Lower Silesian Voivodeship, in south-western Poland.
