= Jałowiec, Lower Silesian Voivodeship =

Jałowiec
- Village
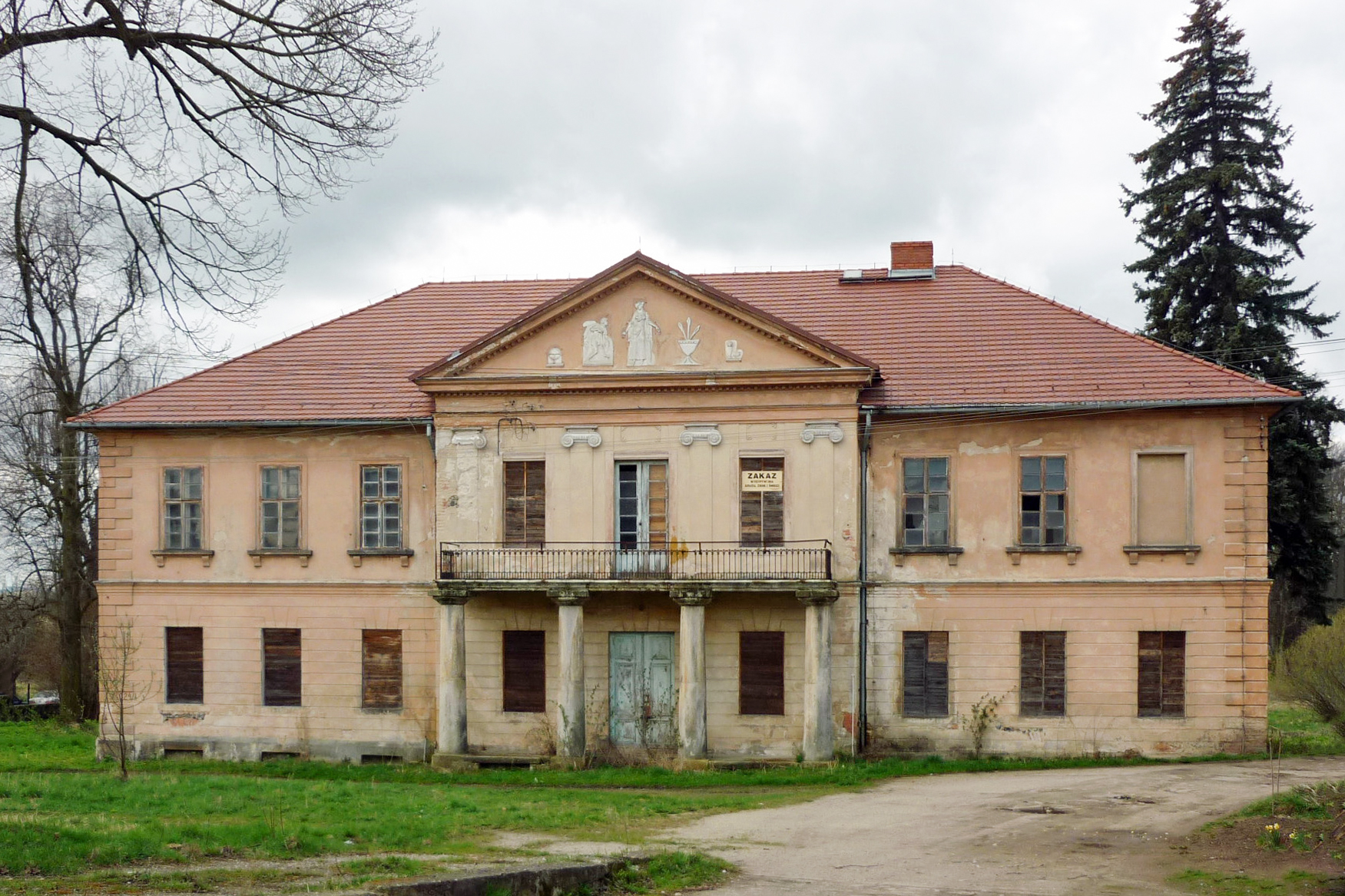
- Palace in the village

- Location within Poland
- Coordinates: 51°05′39″N 15°18′38″E
- Country: Poland
- Voivodeship: Lower Silesian
- County: Lubań
- Gmina: Lubań
- Time zone: UTC+1 (CET)
  - Summer (DST): UTC+2 (CEST)
- Vehicle registration: DLB

Jałowiec [jaˈwɔvjɛt͡s] (German: Wingendorf) is a village in the administrative district of Gmina Lubań, within Lubań County, Lower Silesian Voivodeship, in south-western Poland.

The National Heritage Board of Poland (Narodowy Instytut Dziedzictwa) has put the Protestant church of 1799 and the palace and park of Jałowiec on its monument list.

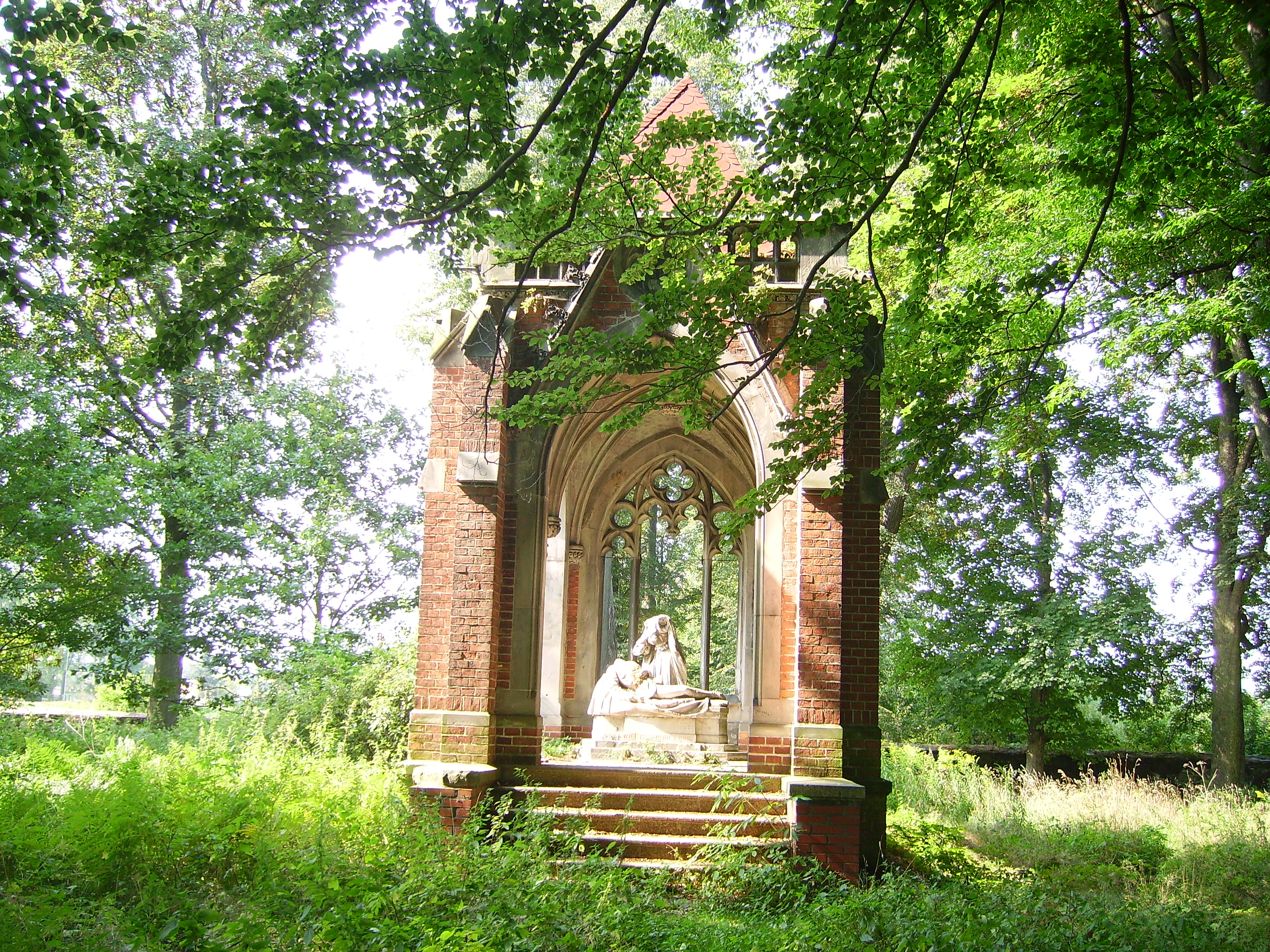
Ruin of the Protestant church built 1799
