= Mściszów =

- Village
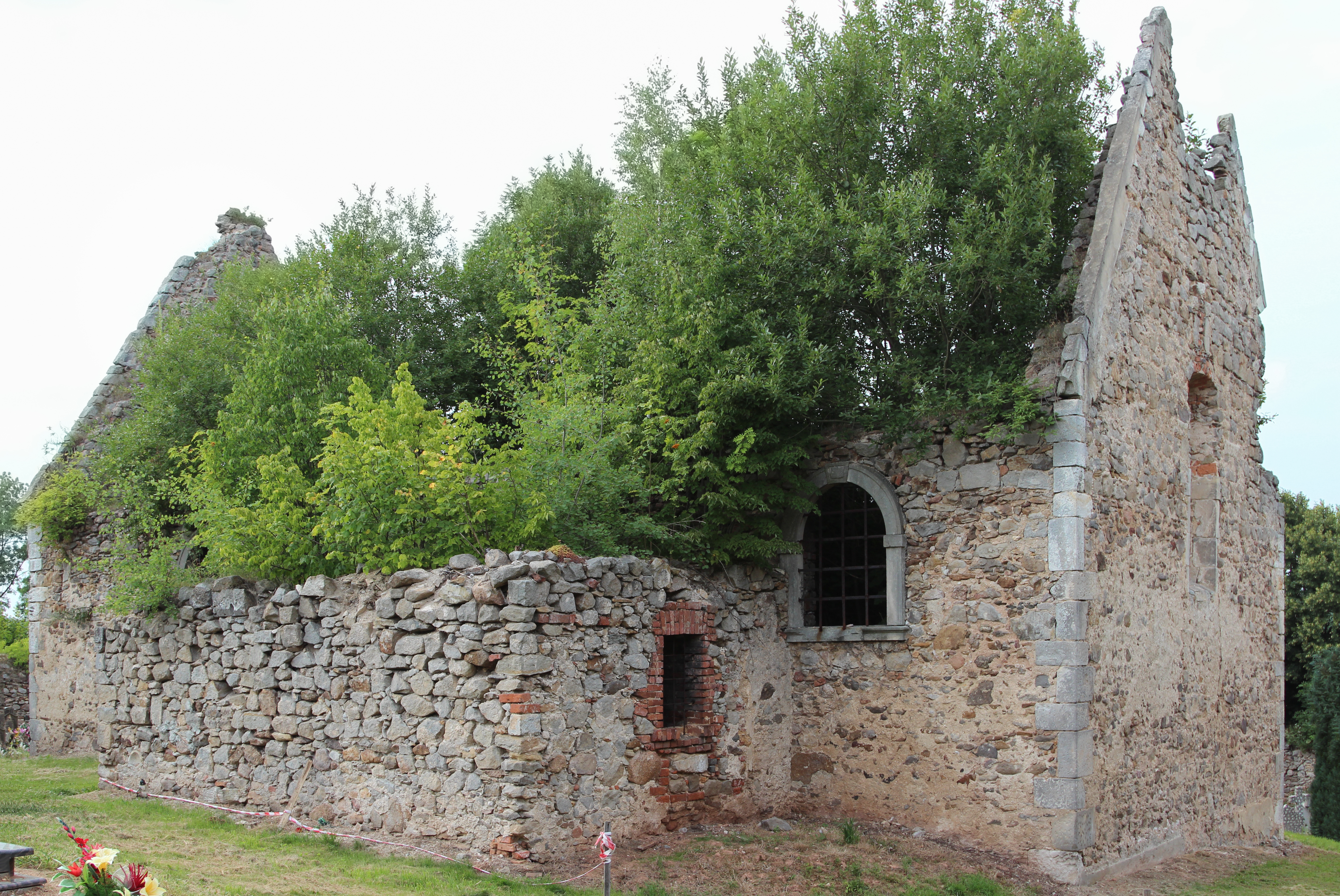
- Ruins of the Church of Saint George

- Location within Poland
- Coordinates: 51°8′N 15°24′E
- Country: Poland
- Voivodeship: Lower Silesian
- County: Lubań
- Gmina: Lubań

Mściszów [ˈmɕt͡ɕiʂuf] (German: Seifersdorf) is a village in the administrative district of Gmina Lubań, within Lubań County, Lower Silesian Voivodeship, in south-western Poland.
