= Radostów Dolny =

- Village
- Location within Poland
- Coordinates: 51°08′N 15°20′E
- Country: Poland
- Voivodeship: Lower Silesian
- County: Lubań
- Gmina: Lubań
- Population: 240

Radostów Dolny [raˈdɔstuf ˈdɔlnɨ] (German: Nieder Thiemendorf) is a village in the administrative district of Gmina Lubań, within Lubań County, Lower Silesian Voivodeship, in south-western Poland.
