= Kościelnik =

- Village
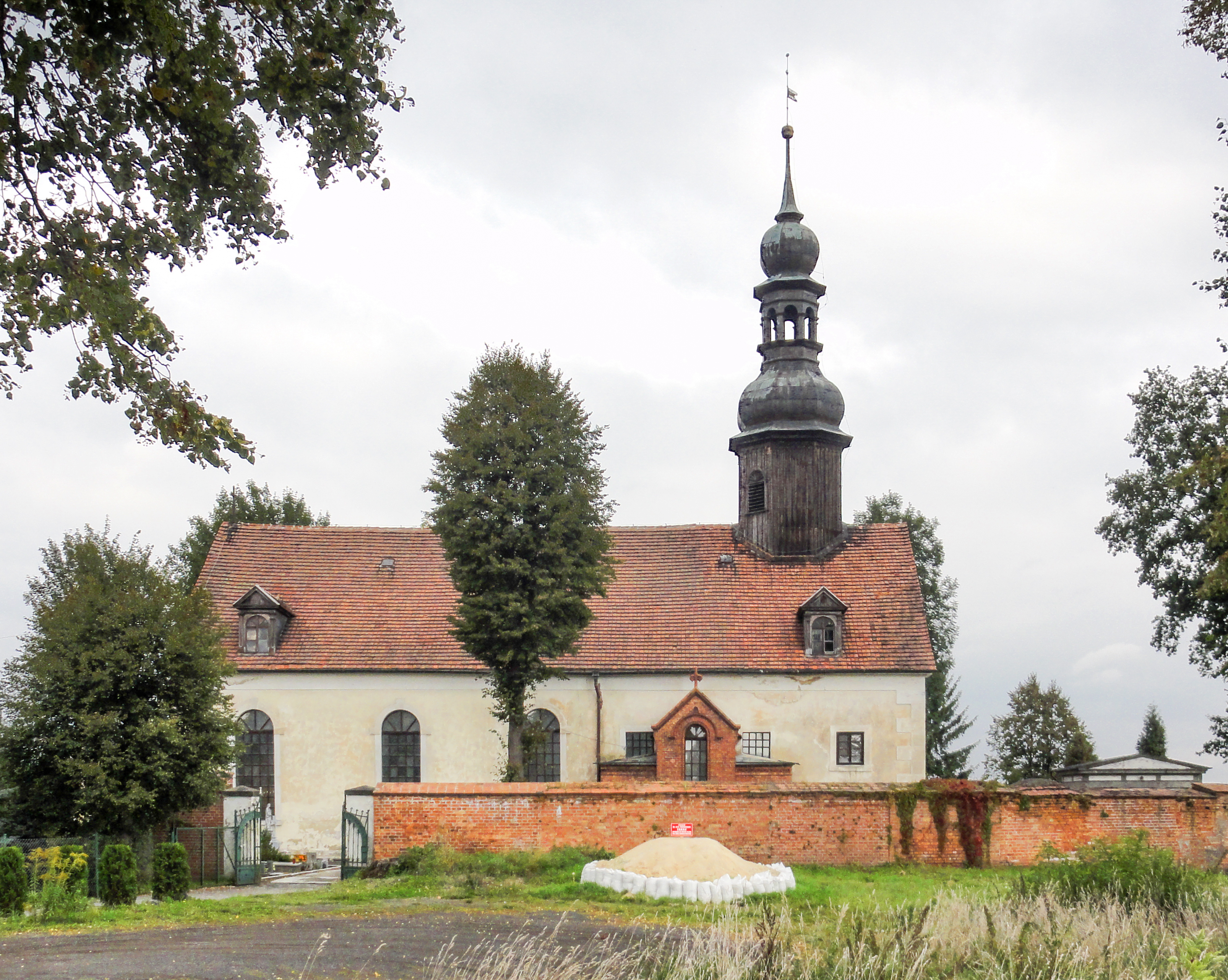
- Church of Saint John the Baptist

- Location within Poland
- Coordinates: 51°5′N 15°17′E
- Country: Poland
- Voivodeship: Lower Silesian
- County: Lubań
- Gmina: Lubań

Kościelnik [kɔɕˈt͡ɕɛlnik] (German: Holzkirch) is a village in the administrative district of Gmina Lubań, within Lubań County, Lower Silesian Voivodeship, in south-western Poland.
