= Pisarzowice, Lubań County =

Pisarzowice
- Village
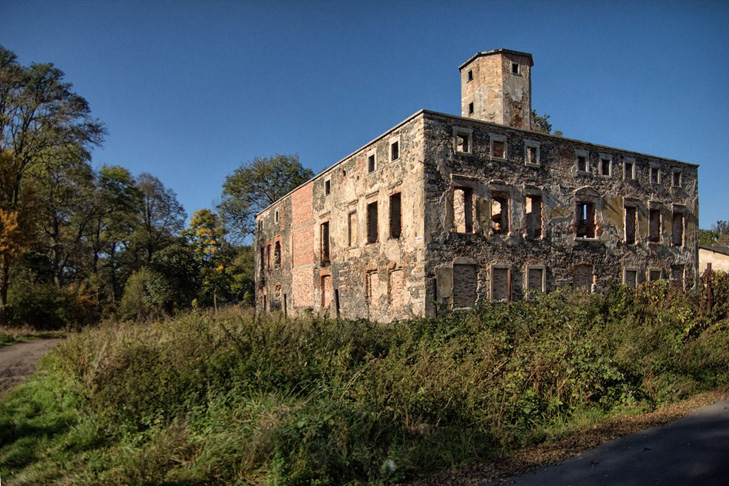
- Ruins of a palace

- Location within Poland
- Coordinates: 51°8′42″N 15°13′26″E
- Country: Poland
- Voivodeship: Lower Silesian
- County: Lubań
- Gmina: Lubań
- Population: 1,600
- Time zone: UTC+1 (Central European Time)
- ISO 3166 code: POL

Pisarzowice [pisaʐɔˈvit͡sɛ] (German: Schreibersdorf) is a village in the administrative district of Gmina Lubań, within Lubań County, Lower Silesian Voivodeship, in south-western Poland.
