= Kościelniki Dolne =

- Village
- Location within Poland
- Coordinates: 51°04′50″N 15°17′43″E
- Country: Poland
- Voivodeship: Lower Silesian
- County: Lubań
- Gmina: Lubań

Kościelniki Dolne ([kɔɕt͡ɕɛlˈniki ˈdɔlnɛ]) (German: Nieder-Steinkirch) is a village in the administrative district of Gmina Lubań, within Lubań County, Lower Silesian Voivodeship, in south-western Poland.
