= Battle of Hennersdorf =

1745 battle

- Part of the Second Silesian War (War of the Austrian Succession)
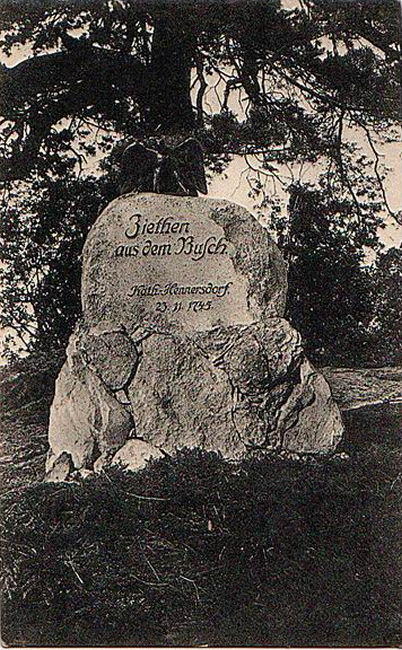
- Memorial stone of Hans Joachim von Zieten in Hennersdorf
Date	23 November 1745
Location	Hennersdorf, Silesia (Prussia, present-day Poland) 51°10′00″N 15°16′00″E
Result	Prussian victory

Belligerents
(Kingdom of Prussia) Prussia	(Electorate of Saxony) Saxony

Commanders and leaders
Frederick II; General Zieten	Prince Charles Alexander of Lorraine; General Buchner

Strength
20 squadrons of hussars 10 squadrons of cuirassiers	6 squadrons of cuirassiers 2 infantry battalions

Casualties and losses
Unknown	2,000, including 1,000 prisoners

Frederick the Great
current battle
First Silesian War
Second Silesian War
Third Silesian War

The Battle of Hennersdorf, sometimes referred to as Catholic-Hennersdorf, was a minor encounter that took place on 23 November 1745 in Katholisch-Hennersdorf in Silesia (Prussia, present-day Poland) during the Second Silesian War (part of the War of the Austrian Succession). The Prussians under Frederick II defeated the Austrians under Prince Charles Alexander of Lorraine. The Prussians surprised the Austrians and Saxons in their cantonments in Lusatia with the most success at Hennersdorf. There a force of two regiments of hussars and two regiments of cuirassiers under Zieten attacked a small force of two battalions of Saxon infantry and three regiments of Saxon cavalry. The Saxons, after making a desperate stand, were overwhelmed by the arrival of additional Prussian cavalry, infantry and artillery.
