= Radogoszcz, Lower Silesian Voivodeship =

Radogoszcz
- Village
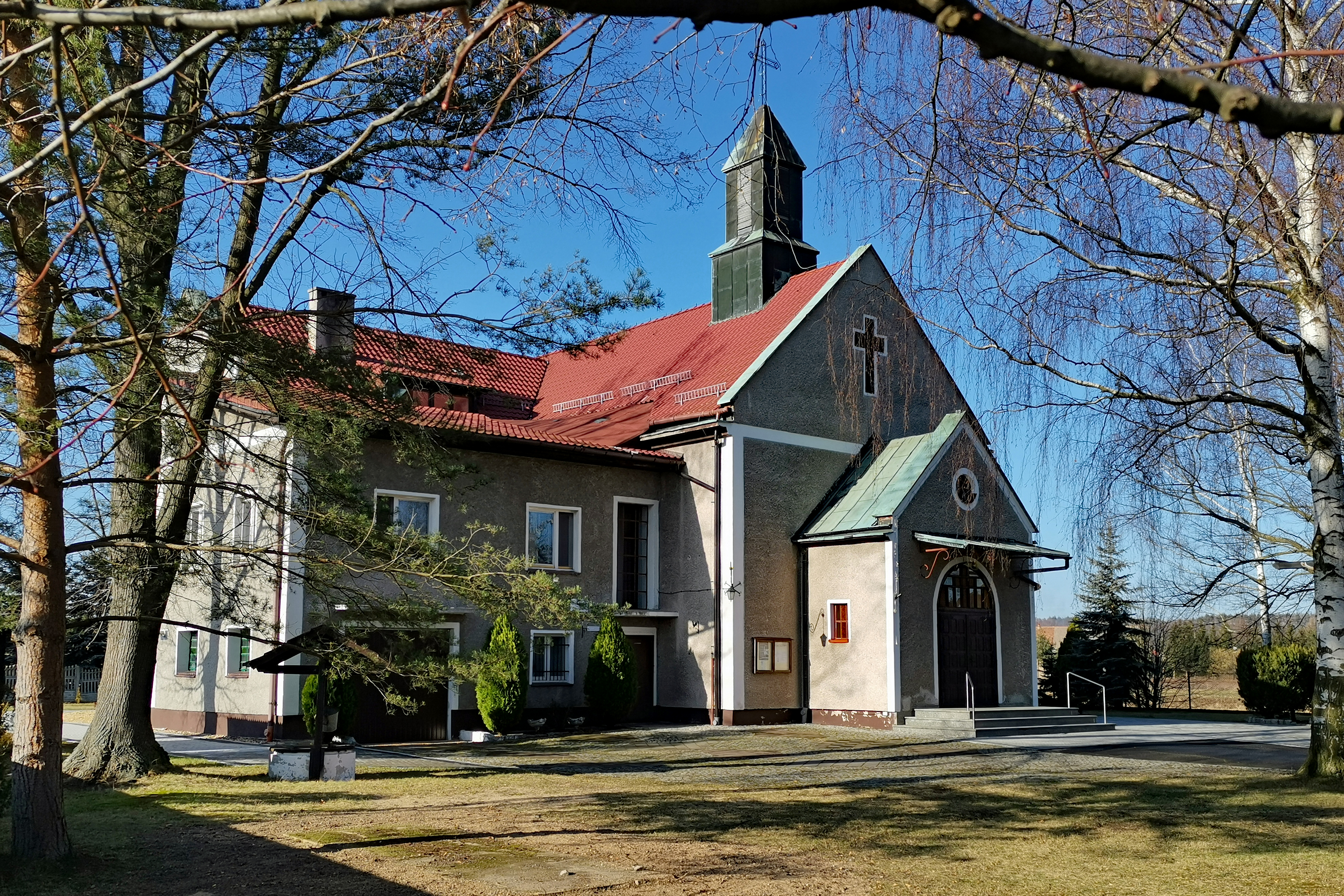
- Church of Our Lady Queen of Poland

- Location within Poland
- Coordinates: 51°8′N 15°19′E
- Country: Poland
- Voivodeship: Lower Silesian
- County: Lubań
- Gmina: Lubań
- Time zone: UTC+1 (CET)
  - Summer (DST): UTC+2 (CEST)
- Vehicle registration: DLB

Radogoszcz [raˈdɔɡɔʂt͡ʂ] (German: Wünschendorf) is a village in the administrative district of Gmina Lubań, within Lubań County, Lower Silesian Voivodeship, in south-western Poland.
