= Radostów Górny =

- Village
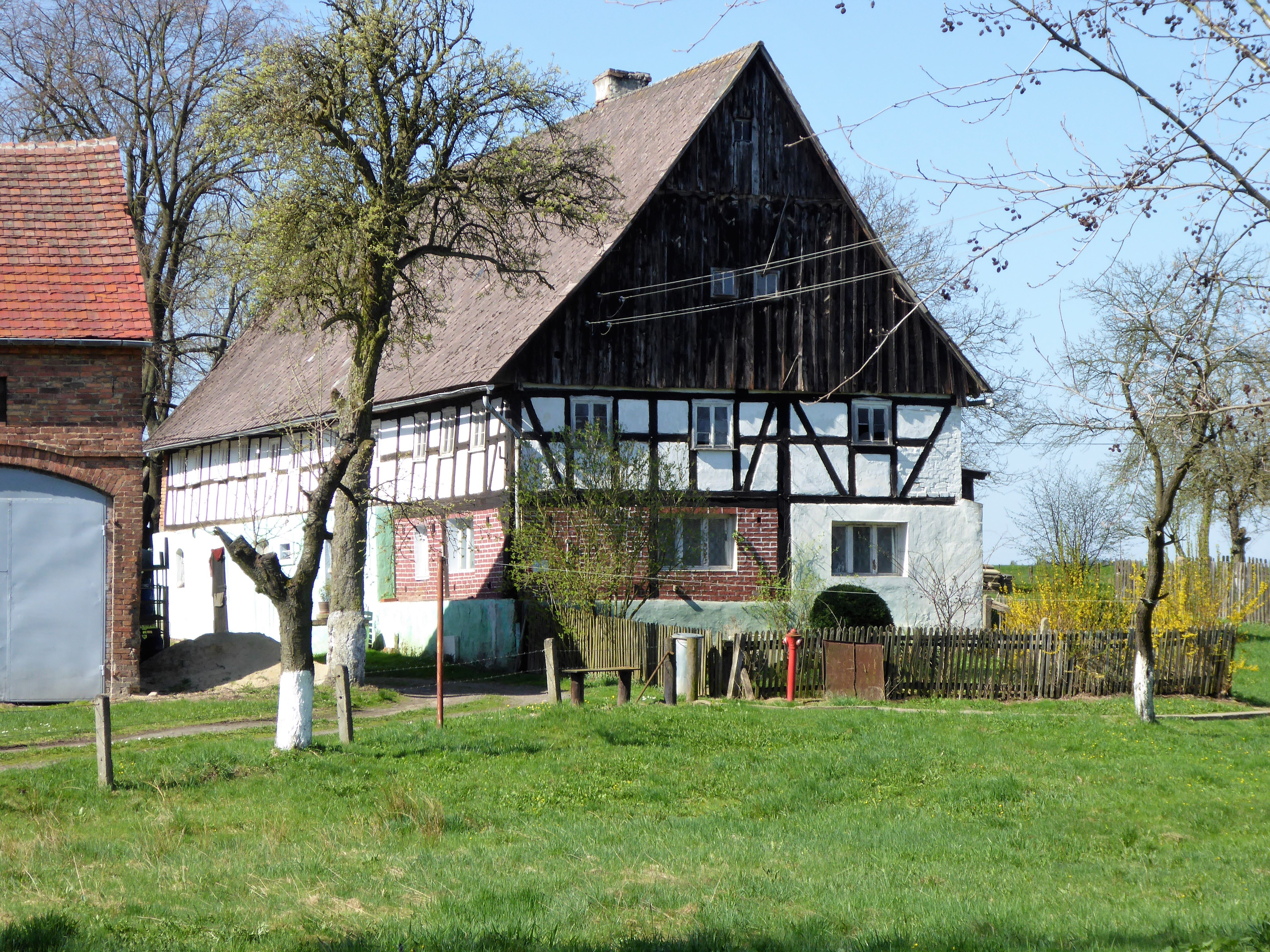

- Location within Poland
- Coordinates: 51°06′13″N 15°22′03″E
- Country: Poland
- Voivodeship: Lower Silesian
- County: Lubań
- Gmina: Lubań

Radostów Górny [raˈdɔstuf ˈɡurnɨ] (German: Ober Thiemendorf) is a village in the administrative district of Gmina Lubań, within Lubań County, Lower Silesian Voivodeship, in south-western Poland.
