= Statue of Leopold I, Prince of Anhalt-Dessau =

Statue in Berlin, Germany

Leopold I, Prince of Anhalt-Dessau
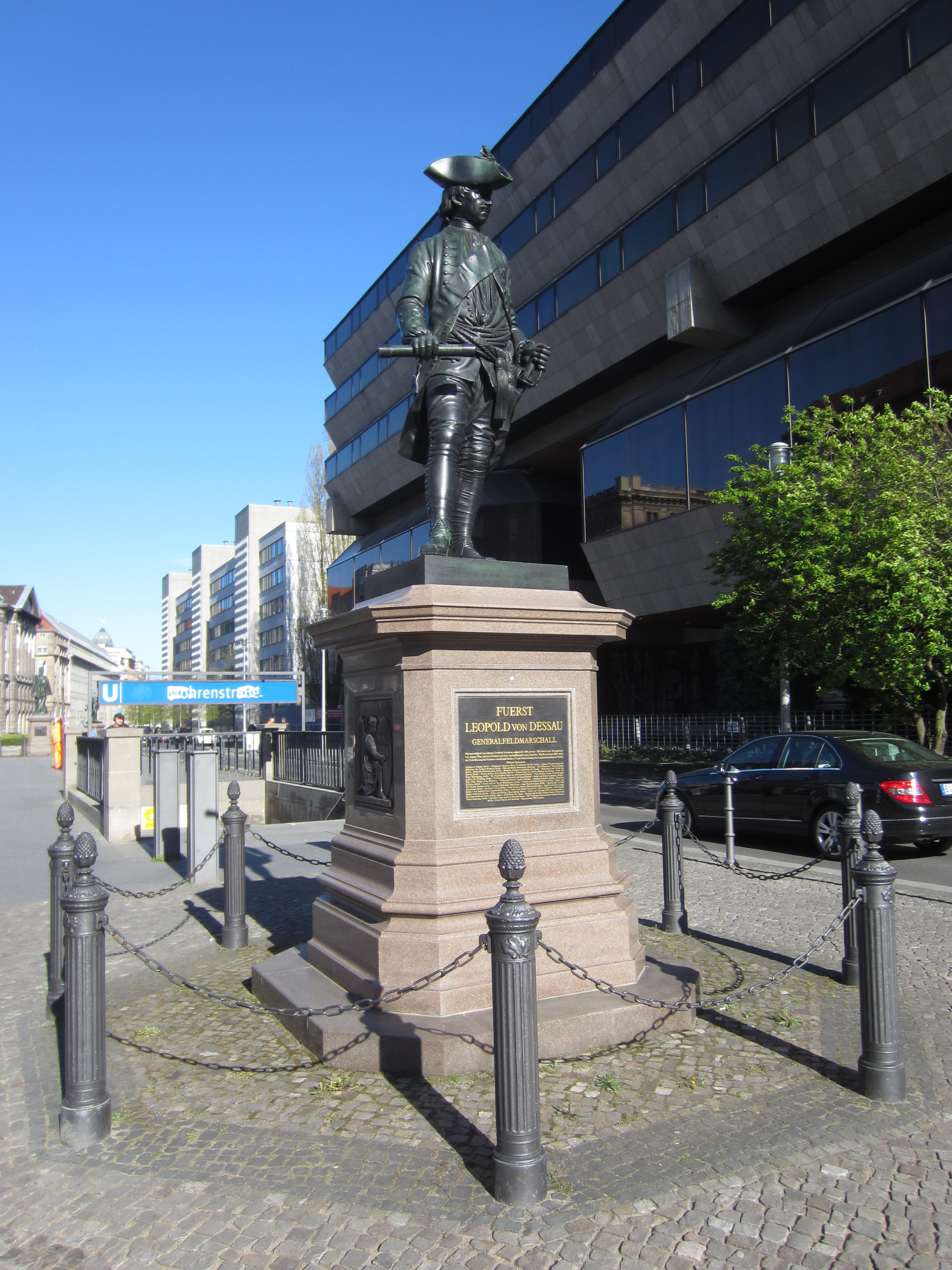
- The statue in 2016
- Artist: August Kiß
- Medium: Bronze sculpture
- Location: Berlin, Germany; 52°30′41.36″N 13°23′01.02″E

The statue of Leopold I, Prince of Anhalt-Dessau ("der alte Dessauer") is a bronze sculpture installed at Wilhelmplatz in Berlin, Germany.

At the end of the Seven Years' War in 1763 a plan was formulated to erect marble statues of Prussian generals who died in the war. Initially four were installed, between 1769 and 1786. Between 1794 and 1828 two statues, including Leopold I by Johann Gottfried Schadow, which had initially been intended to be installed elsewhere in Berlin were relocated there.

Because of the vulnerability of the marble statues, the sculptor Christian Daniel Rauch suggested recasting them in Bronze. The marble originals were moved to the Bode Museum, and the new statues were cast by August Kiß. The statues survived World War II, but were not on public view for many years. Finally the statues or Leopold and Hans Joachim von Zieten were re-erected between 2003 and 2005 on a subway island on the transverse axis of the former Wilhelmplatz.
