= Uniegoszcz =

- Village
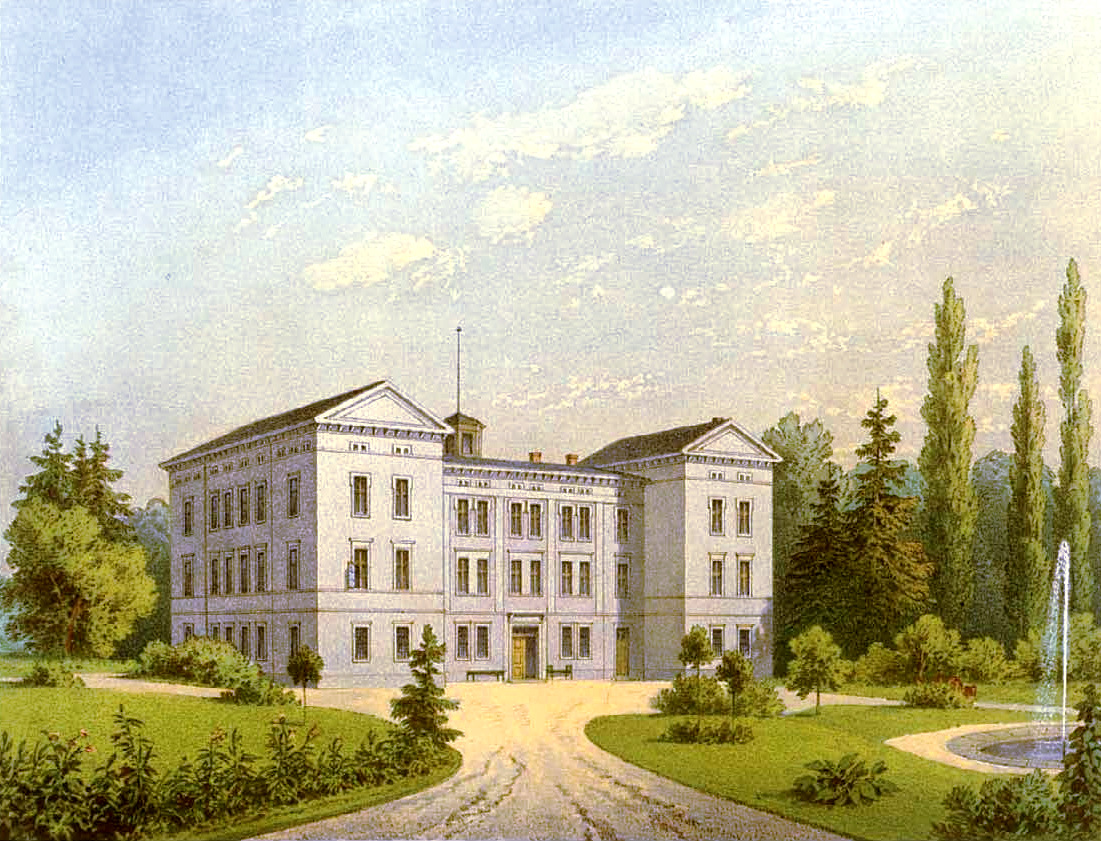
- Castle Berthelsdorf around 1860, Edition by Alexander Duncker

- Location within Poland
- Coordinates: 51°07′14″N 15°19′20″E
- Country: Poland
- Voivodeship: Lower Silesian
- County: Lubań
- Gmina: Lubań

Uniegoszcz ([uˈɲɛɡɔʂt͡ʂ]) (German: Alt-Bertelsdorf) is a village in the administrative district of Gmina Lubań, within Lubań County, Lower Silesian Voivodeship, in south-western Poland.
