= Gmina Lubań =

Gmina Lubań Lubań Commune
- Gmina
- Coat of arms
- Interactive map of Gmina Lubań
- Coordinates (Lubań): 51°07′N 15°18′E
- Country: Poland
- Voivodeship: Lower Silesian
- County: Lubań
- Seat: Lubań
- Sołectwos: Henryków Lubański, Jałowiec, Kościelnik, Kościelniki Dolne, Mściszów, Nawojów Łużycki, Nawojów Śląski, Pisarzowice, Radogoszcz, Radostów Dolny, Radostów Górny, Radostów Średni, Uniegoszcz

Area
  - Total: 142.15 km^{2} (54.88 sq mi)

Population (2019-06-30)
  - Total: 6,601
  - Density: 46.44/km^{2} (120.3/sq mi)
- Website: http://www.luban.ug.gov.pl

Gmina Lubań is a rural gmina (administrative district) in Lubań County, Lower Silesian Voivodeship, in south-western Poland. Its seat is the town of Lubań, although the town is not part of the territory of the gmina.

The gmina covers an area of 142.15 square kilometres (54.9 sq mi), and as of 2019 its total population is 6,601.

== Neighbouring gminas ==
Gmina Lubań is bordered by the town of Lubań and the gminas of Gryfów Śląski, Leśna, Nowogrodziec, Olszyna, Pieńsk, Platerówka, Siekierczyn, Sulików and Zgorzelec.

== Villages ==
The gmina contains the villages of Henryków Lubański, Jałowiec, Kościelnik, Kościelniki Dolne, Mściszów, Nawojów Łużycki, Nawojów Śląski, Pisarzowice, Radogoszcz, Radostów Dolny, Radostów Górny, Radostów Średni and Uniegoszcz.
