= Nawojów Łużycki =

- Village
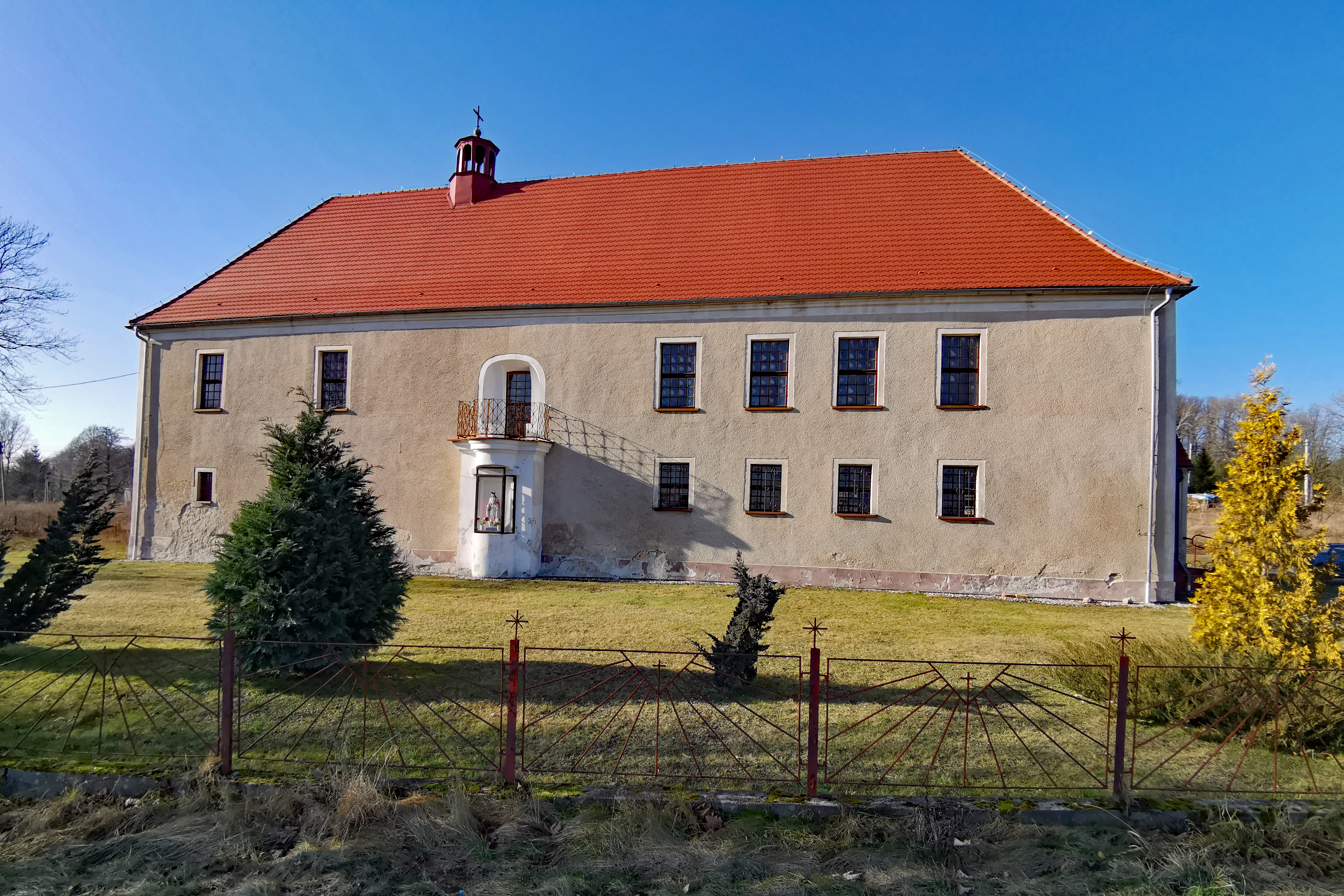
- Manor house

- Location within Poland
- Coordinates: 51°10′36″N 15°20′27″E
- Country: Poland
- Voivodeship: Lower Silesian
- County: Lubań
- Gmina: Lubań

Population
  - Total: 310

Nawojów Łużycki [naˈvɔjuf wuˈʐɨt͡ski] (German: Sächsisch Haugsdorf) is a village in the administrative district of Gmina Lubań, within Lubań County, Lower Silesian Voivodeship, in south-western Poland.
