= Lyubokhna =

Urban locality in Bryansk Oblast, Russia

Lyubokhna Любохна
- Urban-type settlement
- Interactive map of Lyubokhna
- Location of Lyubokhna Lyubokhna (Bryansk Oblast)
- Coordinates: 53°30′22″N 34°23′18″E
- Country: Russia
- Federal subject: Bryansk Oblast
- Administrative district: Dyatkovsky District

Population (2010 Census)
  - Total: 5,446
  - Estimate (2025): 4,774 (−12.3%)
- Time zone: UTC+3 (MSK)
- Postal code: 242620
- OKTMO ID: 15616159051

Lyubokhna (Russian: Любохна́) is an urban-type settlement in Dyatkovsky District of Bryansk Oblast, Russia. Population: 4,957 (2021 census); 5,446 (2010 census); 5,293 (2002 census); 5,377 (1989 Soviet census).
