= Hans Joachim von Zieten =

Prussian general

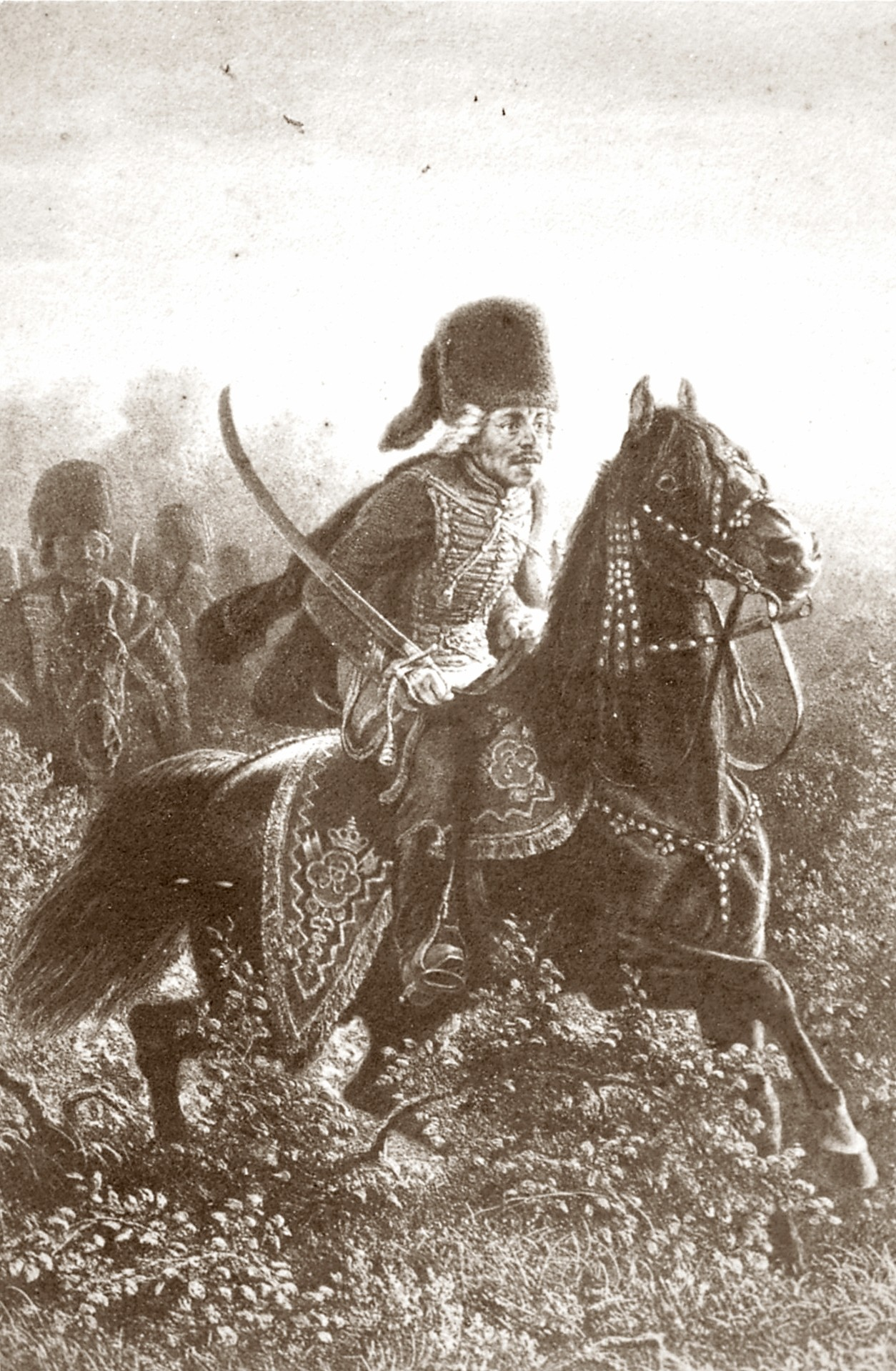
- Born: 14 May 1699; Wustrau, Brandenburg
- Died: 26 January 1786 (aged 86); Berlin
- Military career
- Allegiance: (Kingdom of Prussia) Prussia
- Branch: Army
- Rank: General of Cavalry
- Nickname: Zieten aus dem Busch
- Commands: Zieten Hussars
- Conflicts: War of the Polish Succession; First Silesian War; Second Silesian War; Battle of Hohenfriedberg; Battle of Katholisch-Hennersdorf; Battle of Kesselsdorf; Seven Years' War; Battle of Reichenberg; Battle of Prague; Battle of Kolin; Battle of Leuthen; Battle of Domstadtl; Battle of Torgau
- Awards: Pour le Mérite; Order of the Black Eagle

Hans Joachim von Zieten, sometimes spelled Johann Joachim von Ziethen, (14 May 1699 – 26 January 1786), also known as Zieten aus dem Busch, was a cavalry general in the Prussian Army. He served in four wars and was instrumental in several victories during the reign of Frederick the Great, most particularly at Hohenfriedberg and Torgau. He is also well known for a raid into the Habsburg territories during the Second Silesian War, known as Zieten's Ride. After engaging in a reputed 74 duels, and fighting in four wars, he died in his bed at the age of 86.

== Early life ==
Zieten was born on 14 May 1699 in the hamlet of Wustrau, now part of Fehrbellin, in the Margraviate of Brandenburg. His father was Joachim Matthias (1657–1720) and his mother, Ilsabe Catharine Jurgass. The family had lived there for several hundred years; records show them founding a Latin School in the mid-fourteenth century. The property was small and the family referred to the ramshackle house as a calliope. His father shared the property with his brother, Hans Dietrich; when the brother died in 1693, the father owned the property outright, valued at 4,000 thalers. Zieten was the third of seven children; by 1720, when his father died, only four children remained. Wustrau came to Zieten and his three sisters. The estate was valued at 8,000 thalers, of which the maintenance of the mother had to be fulfilled and his sisters' inheritances and dowries paid. This left Zieten with about half of the value.

== Military career ==
A neighbor, General von Schwendy of Buskow, took Zieten in 1715 as corporal in his regiment in Neuruppin. On 7 July 1722, Zieten became a cadet. Upon his appointment as governor of Spandau, Schwendy, who had been Zieten's mentor, released his regiment to command of Generalmajor Kurt Christoph Graf von Schwerin. In a report to Frederick William I, Zieten was described as "... very small, and of [too] weak [a] voice for commanding." This was sufficient for the so-called soldier-king, who was obsessed with tall men, to overlook Zieten in the promotions lists. On 28 July 1724, Zieten journeyed from Crossen, where his regiment was garrisoned, with a petition for promotion to the King, who then wrote on the margin of the petition that Zieten "shall have his dismissal." Zieten retired to his estates. Two years later, during a stay in Berlin, Zieten heard of the doubling of the dragoon regiment of Wuthenow and obtained a position as lieutenant in this regiment. In 1727, after an argument with his captain (Rittmeister), he was condemned to a one-year imprisonment on the fortress of Königsberg for disobedience. After returning from the fortress, Zieten challenged the Rittmeister to a duel and he was subsequently cashiered. He returned to Wustrau.

By 1730, on the recommendation of General Wilhelm Dietrich von Buddenbrock, the supposedly rehabilitated Zieten entered the newly formed Freikompanie (independent company) of hussars at Potsdam. On 1 March 1732, a second company of the Hussars was created, and Zieten was appointed as its chief and promoted to the Rittmeister with 50 thalers a month's salary. In summer 1732, Zieten was given four weeks of arrest for an offense. In 1735, Frederick William appointed Zieten as the head of a hussar company, and sent him to the Imperial Army on the Rhine, where he participated in the Rhine campaign. Károly József Batthyány, the Austrian hussars' superintendent, served as his mentor in the fighting against France. At that time, the Austrians were the reputed masters of light cavalry work. His next promotion, to major took place on 29 January 1736.

In 1737 Zieten married the 33-year-old Judith von Jürgaß. His eldest daughter came from this marriage. Shortly before the wedding, he dueled with his superintendent, Lieutenant Colonel Alexander Ludwig von Wurmburg. Both were severely wounded.

== Service to Frederick the Great ==
In 1741, at the onset of the First Silesian War (War of Austrian Succession), Zieten was a major and squadron leader. On 10 May 1741 he distinguished himself in combat with the Austrians at the Battle of Strehlen. He was promoted to lieutenant colonel in the Life hussar regiment and received the Order Pour le Mérite.

Zieten met his old teacher, Batthyány, during the First Silesian War and defeated him at the Battle of Rothschloss. The chivalrous Austrian sent him a complimentary letter a few days later, and General von Winterfeldt, who had been in command at Rothschloss, reported upon his conduct so favorably that Frederick marked him for future high command. Within a year he was colonel and proprietor of the newly formed Hussar Regiment, the Zieten Hussars, the second Hussar Regiment. In the Moravian foray of the following year, Zieten and his hussars penetrated almost to Vienna, and in the retreat to Silesia he was constantly employed with the rearguard.

Although upon his rejoining the military in 1730 as a "rehabilitated" officer, Zieten's temperament had not wholly reformed. With several contemporaries, he maintained a running rivalry with Hans Karl von Winterfeldt, one of Frederick's trusted confidantes. It had its origins in simultaneous promotions to colonel following the Battle of Rothschloss. Although Zieten was the older in years and service, and had actually been in command at the battle, he and Winterfeldt were promoted together. Zieten resented the rapid promotion of his junior. The animosity was perpetuated by Frederick's long-standing trust of Winterfeldt, who had stood by him during the Katte Affair.

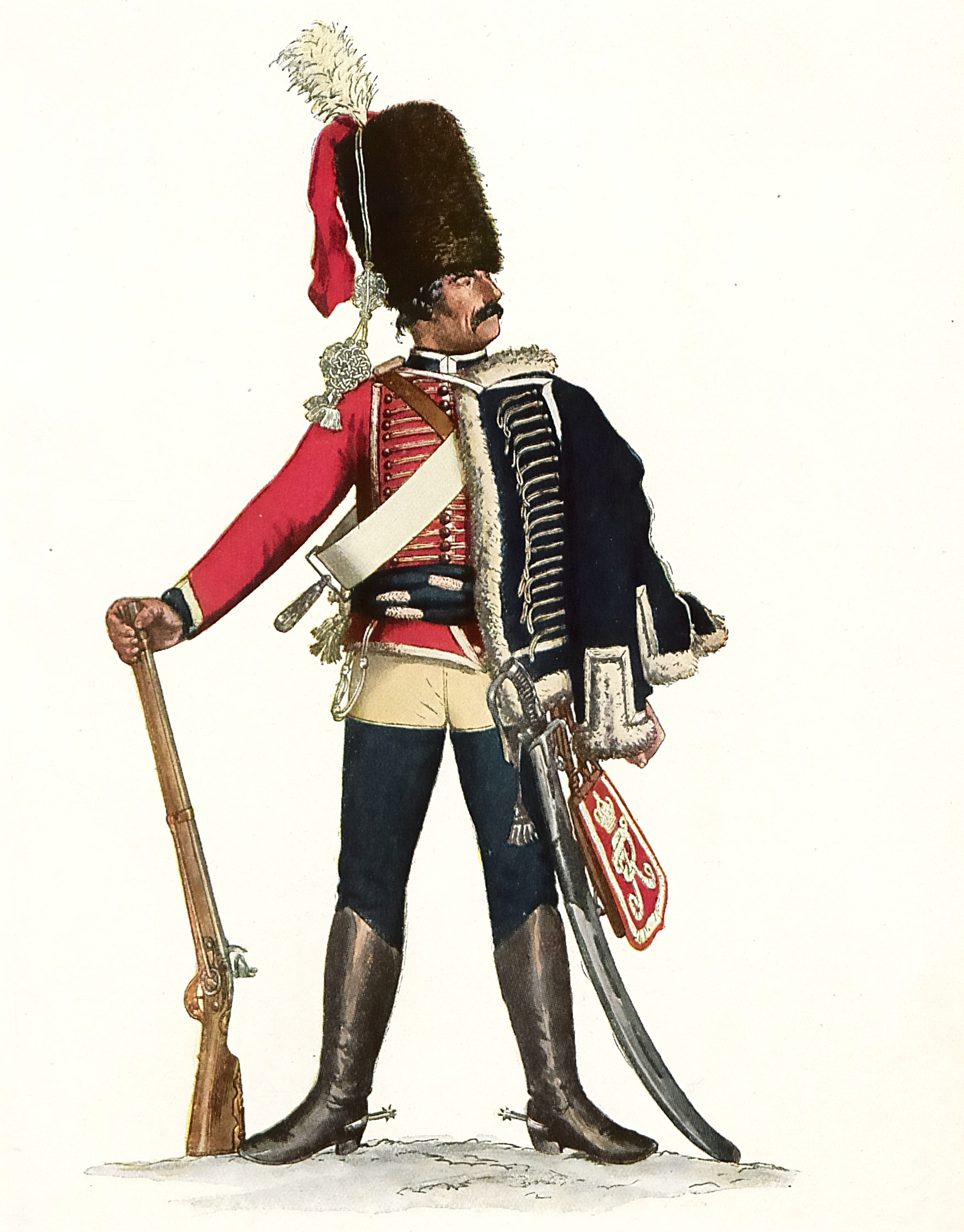
Zieten transformed the tactics of his hussar troop, and gave them a new uniform.

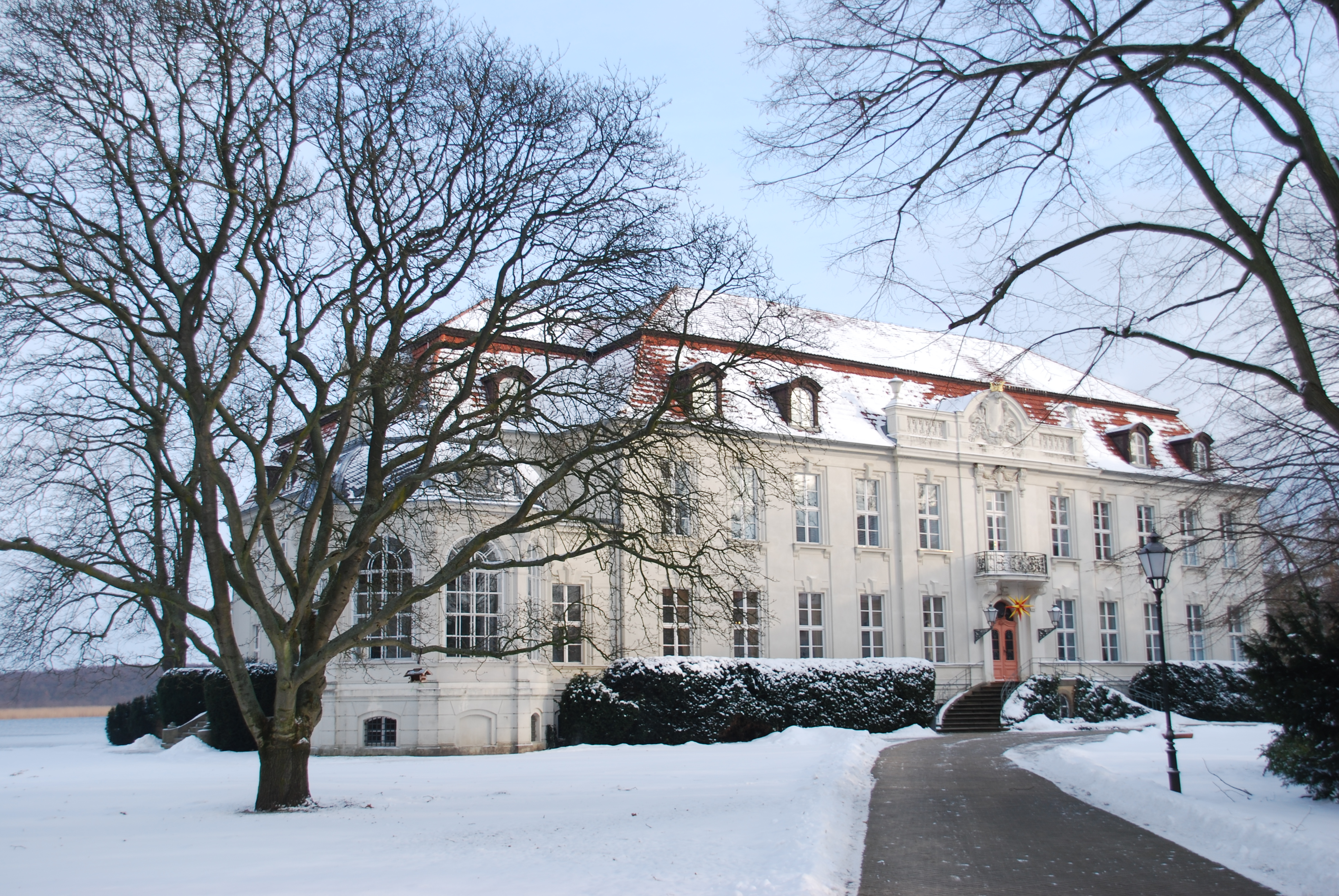
Zieten had the family house demolished, and built a new manor house of Wustrau: Schloss Wustrau.

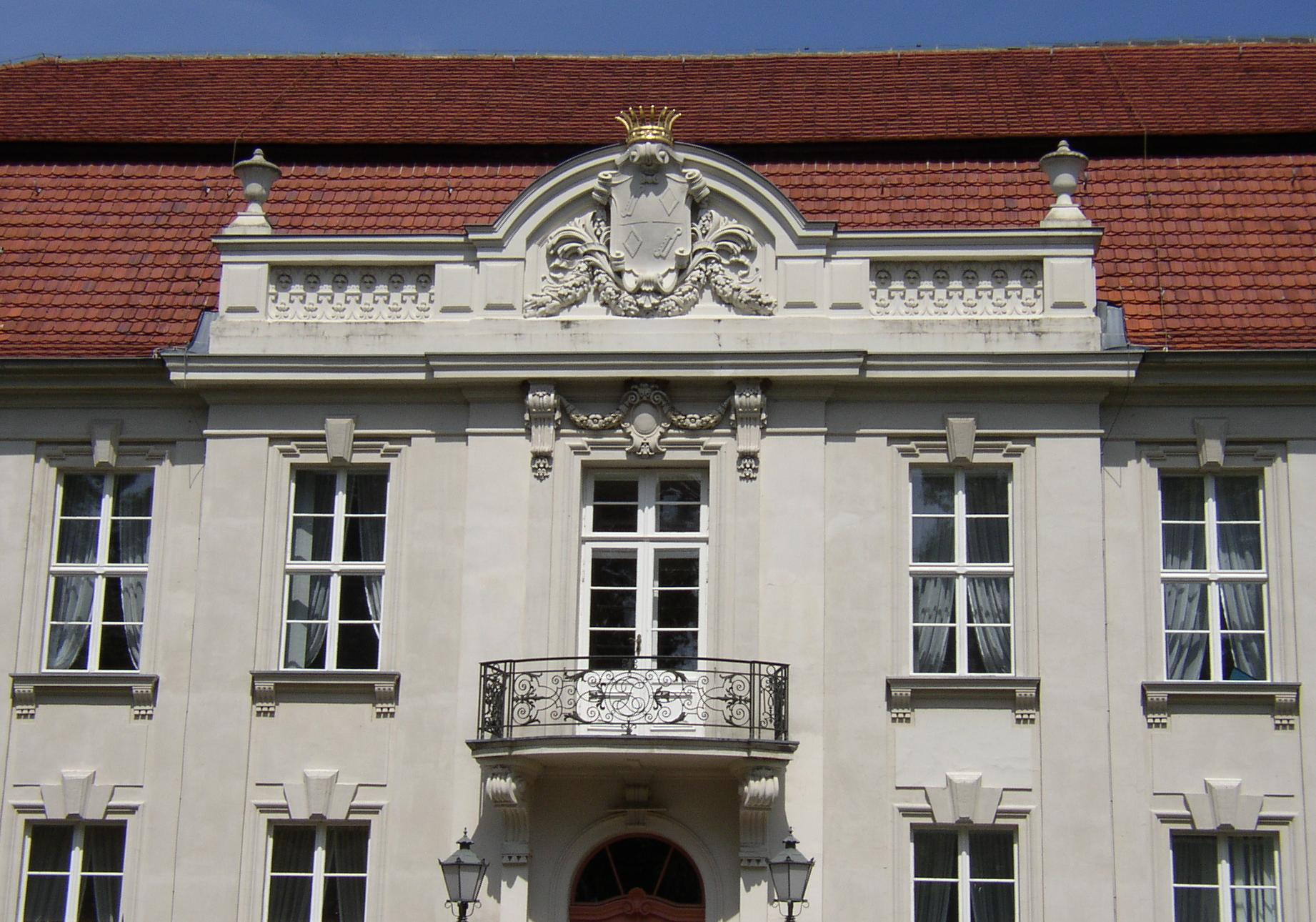
Detail of the crest at the family house at Wustrau.

=== Zieten's ride ===
In the winter of 1741–1742, and later during the short peace between the first and second Silesian wars, Zieten was engaged in the reorganization of Prussian cavalry. In 1743 he had his family house, the old "Kaluppe", demolished, and began construction of a new, stately mansion in Wustrau. During the short peace, the hussars, like the rest of the Prussian cavalry, had undergone a complete transformation. To their discipline they had added the dash and skirmishing qualities of the best irregulars, and the Prussian hussars were considered the best of their kind in Europe. In 1743 the Zieten hussars adopted the distinctive tiger-skin pelisse for their parade uniforms, with company officers wearing fur caps with heron feathers and field officers using an eagles' wing.

In 1744, Zieten advanced with the avant-garde of the Prussian army in Bohemia to Budejovice. On his own initiative at Moldau, the colonel, with his red-uniform Hussar Regiment No. 2, forced a larger enemy's force into its knees. Zieten covered the retreat behind the Elbe, and on 12 October, he fell into a violent ambush at Moldau. In this year the nickname, "Zieten aus den Busch" (Zieten of the bush) was born.

On 20 May 1745, he and his hussars distinguished themselves with a daring nocturnal passage past an Austrian corps of 20,000 men. Zieten led the famous Zietenritt (Zietenride) around the enemy's lines to deliver the King's order to a distant detachment. Two weeks later, at Hohenfriedberg on 4 June, the Zieten Hussars distinguished themselves for the first time in a battle. Before the Battle of Hennersdorf in November, the Zieten Hussars shadowed the Imperial army, waiting to pounce on them. At Hennersdorf, Zieten repulsed the sudden and unexpected assault of the Austro-Saxons; Winterfeldt arrived on the field in time to take a decisive part in the victory. Once again the rivals had to share their laurels, and Zieten actually wrote to the king in disparagement of Winterfeldt, receiving in reply a full and generous recognition of his own worth and services, coupled with the curt remark that the king intended to employ General von Winterfeldt in any way that he thought fit.

The victory at Hennersdorf ended the Second Silesian War. After the Treaty of Dresden, the daily routine of peacetime military service began to drag his spirits down. At times, the opinionated Zieten fell into disgrace with the King, who, in Zieten's opinion, did not sufficiently support him. Zieten separated himself from the court, and grumbled to Frederick from his estate. In March 1756, his wife died and the aging general began to be plagued by the gout.

== Seven Years' War ==
Zieten was promoted to generalleutnant and took part in the Battle of Reichenberg in 1757 and again at the Battle of Prague. On 5 May 1757, he received the Order of the Black Eagle. In the Battle of Kolín he commanded the advance guard and was then assigned to Duke August Wilhelm Brunswick-Wolfenbüttel-Bevern, who was given the command in Silesia. On 24 November 1757, he led the rest of the army past Glogau to Liegnitz to join Frederick's army; he subsequently distinguished himself in the Battle of Leuthen on 5 December, by helping to run down the Austrian left flank. At the Battle of Hochkirch, his cavalry, and that of Seydlitz, provided the rear guard for the Prussian withdrawal. During the attack at Domstadt, he could not prevent the loss of a large supply convoy. During the Battle of Liegnitz on 15 August 1760, he managed to keep the Austrian main army at bay so that it could not participate in the battle. Zieten was promoted to general of cavalry. He made one of the few tactical mistakes of his career early in the Battle of Torgau, 3 November 1760, when he misdirected an attack against the Austrian troops; he made up for this error when he and his hussars stormed the Süptitzer heights.

Finally, it was Zieten who, in 1761, took the King out of a deep spiritual crisis while the army was entrenched at Bunzelwitz. Until the end of the war, he was repeatedly entrusted with the supreme command of the Prussian army in the absence of the king. By the end of the war, Zieten belonged to the elite of the kingdom and the inner circle of friends of the monarch.

== Aging years ==
After the Seven Years' War, Zieten retired from active service, widely considered a hero. During the War of the Bavarian Succession, Frederick forbade him to go, so he stayed on his estate at Wustrau with his niece, Johanna von Blumenthal, whose son was serving in his regiment. During this period she gathered his reminiscences for a biography.

In the subsequent years of peace, the old army commander remained a tireless instructor of his now legendary Hussar regiment. In his last years of life, Zieten alternated between Berlin, where he bought a house in 1763 on Kochstrasse No. 61–62. and on his property at Wustrau, where he devoted himself mainly to charity. At the same time, he worked with great care to improve his property. He enjoyed the special trust of Frederick, who frequently visited "his old father Zieten." In one visit with the King, at Sanssouci, after a long conversation, the King ordered a chair to be placed on which he invited the 85-year-old man to sit. Despite his infirmities, Zieten refused to sit in the presence of the monarch; the King said: "Sit down, Zieten, or I will go away."

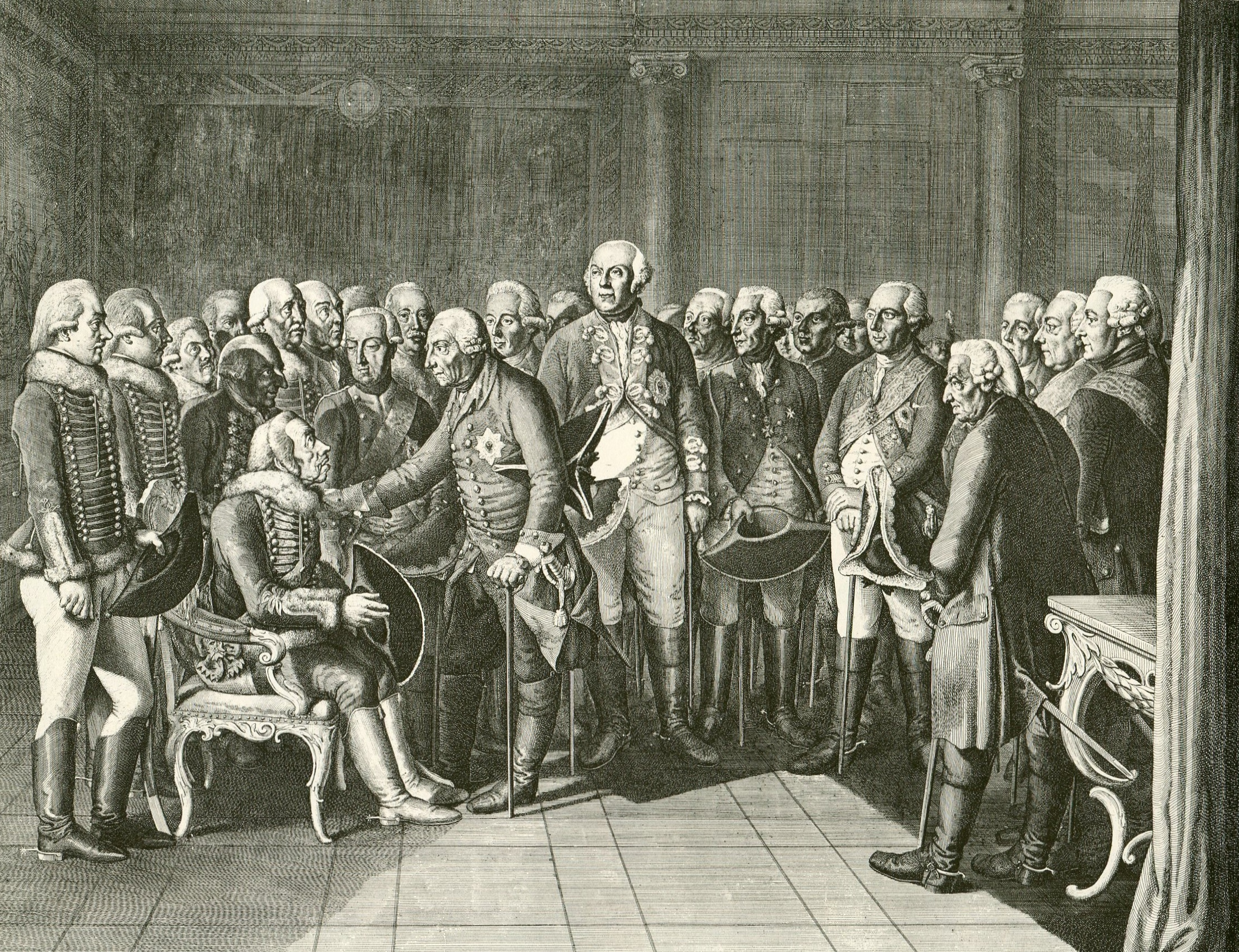
"Sit down, Zieten, or I will go away," said the King. (1800 etching by Daniel Chodowiecki)

On 26 January 1786, Zieten died in his bed in Berlin, a remarkable age considering his hair-trigger temper and his reputed 74 duels. He was buried on 31 January 1786 on the Wustrau cemetery next to the village church. His estate was valued at 65,057 thalers. Apart from property at Wustrau, he left no fortune. The furniture of the Berlin house had to be auctioned after his death, and his widow was only freed from debt by a gift from King Frederick of ten thousand thalers.

== Marriages and children ==
From his first marriage with Judith von Jürgaß (1703–19 March 1756) (married on 5 November 1737) came a daughter, Johanna (1747–7 June 1829). She married Karl von Jürgaß (1702–19 March 1756), the son of Joachim von Jürgaß and Luise von Zieten.

After the death of his first wife, he married on 24 August 1764 to Hedwig von Platen (1738–6 September 1818). His only son, Friedrich von Zieten (6 October 1765–29 June 1854), whose baptism Frederick witnessed, was first a captain of hussars and from 1800–1824 councilor of Ruppin. In 1840 he was raised to the nobility by Frederick William II of Prussia. He died in 1854, unmarried, and was buried in the local cemetery.

With the death of the last male heir, the property and title moved from the Zieten family to the line of Schwerin, due to the marriage of one of his granddaughters, Karoline Albertine Luise Wilhelmine Emilie von Zieten (22 April 1806–24 February 1853) to Albert Ludwig Wilhelm von Schwerin (17 June 1801–27 October 1865). Their children inherited the property and title.

Another famous member of the Hussars-Zieten, Hans Count von Zieten, is only remotely related to Hans Joachim.

== Memorials ==
In 1794 Frederick William II placed a monument to Zieten in Berlin on the Wilhelmplatz (Berlin-Mitte). It was first created by Johann Gottfried Schadow in marble and replaced in 1857 with a bronze cast by August Kiß. It stands today on the Zietenplatz on the corner Wilhelmstraße and Mohrenstraße (Berlin) next to the monument of Leopold I, the Old Dessauer. A similar one stands at Rupppin See.

Memorials
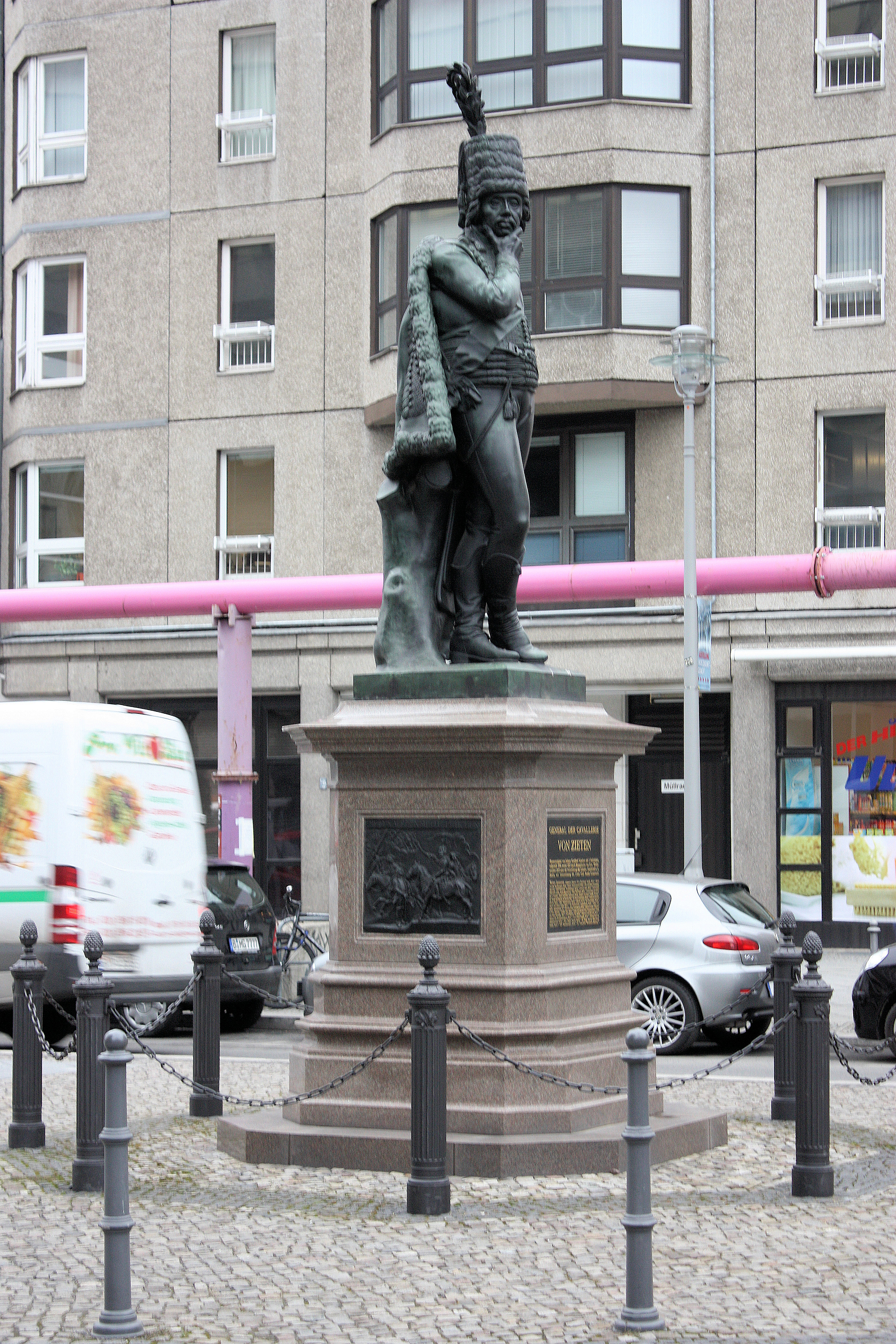
Frederick William II established the first memorial in Berlin in 1794.

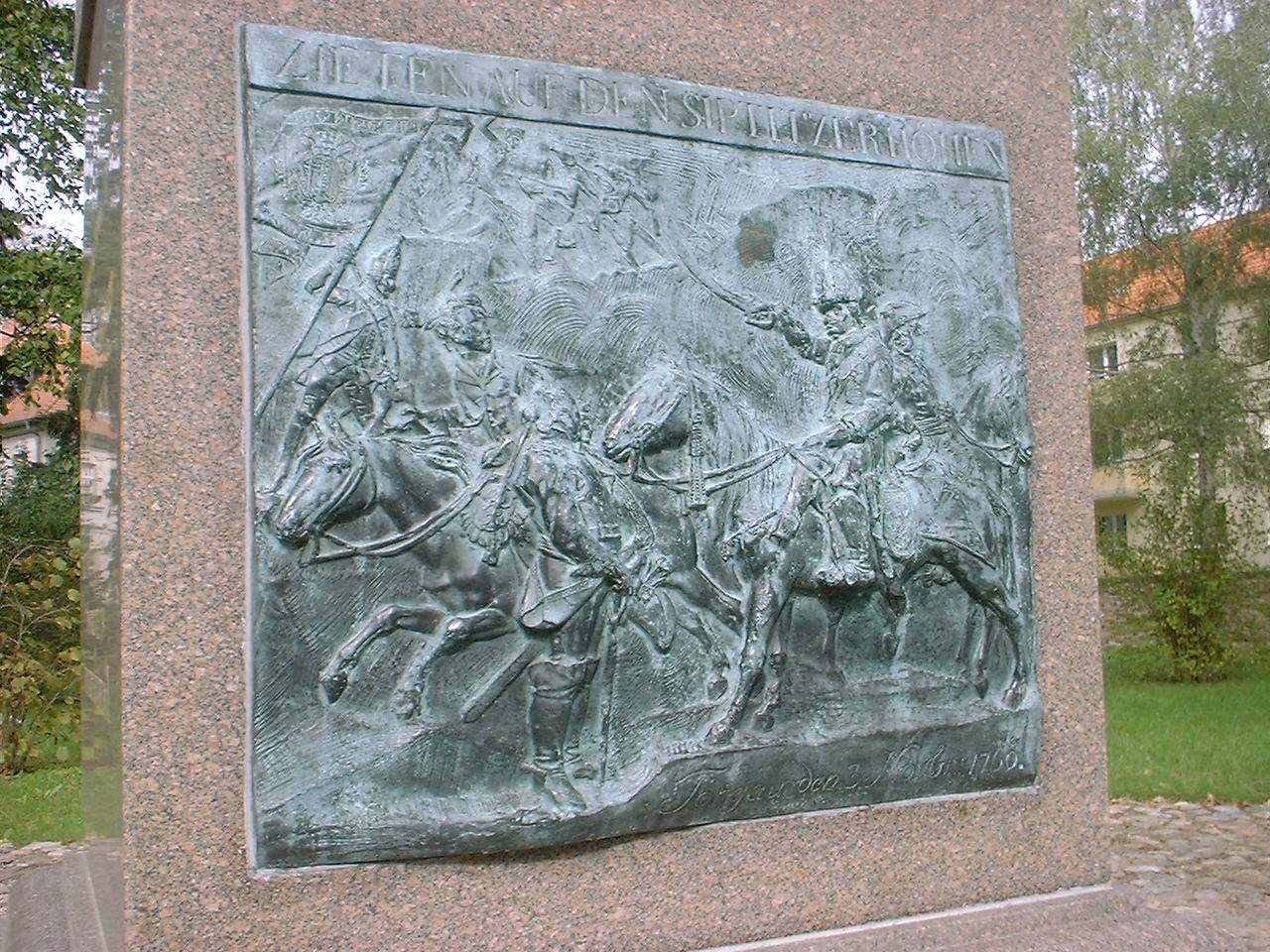
Relief on pedestal of the Memorial plaque for Hans Joachim von Zieten in the Charge of the Süptitzer Höhen (in Fehrbellin-Wustrau)

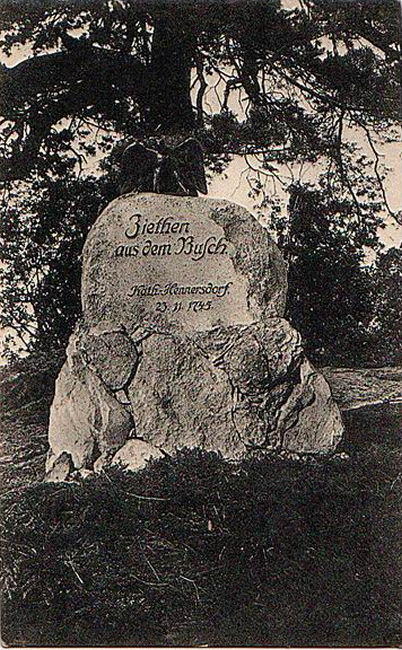
Memorial established at the site of the Battle of Hennersdorf

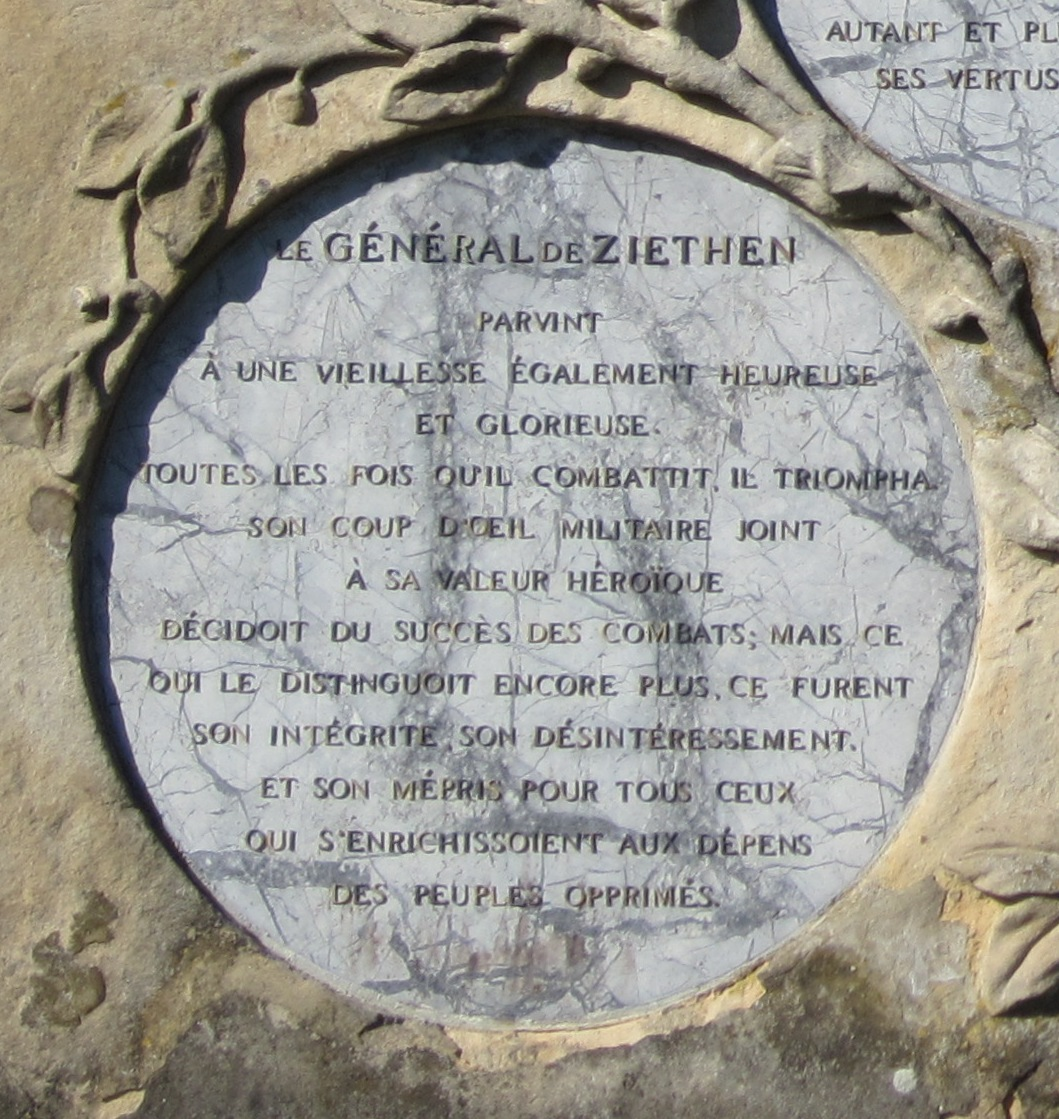
Memorial to Zieten on the Obelisk at Rheinsberg

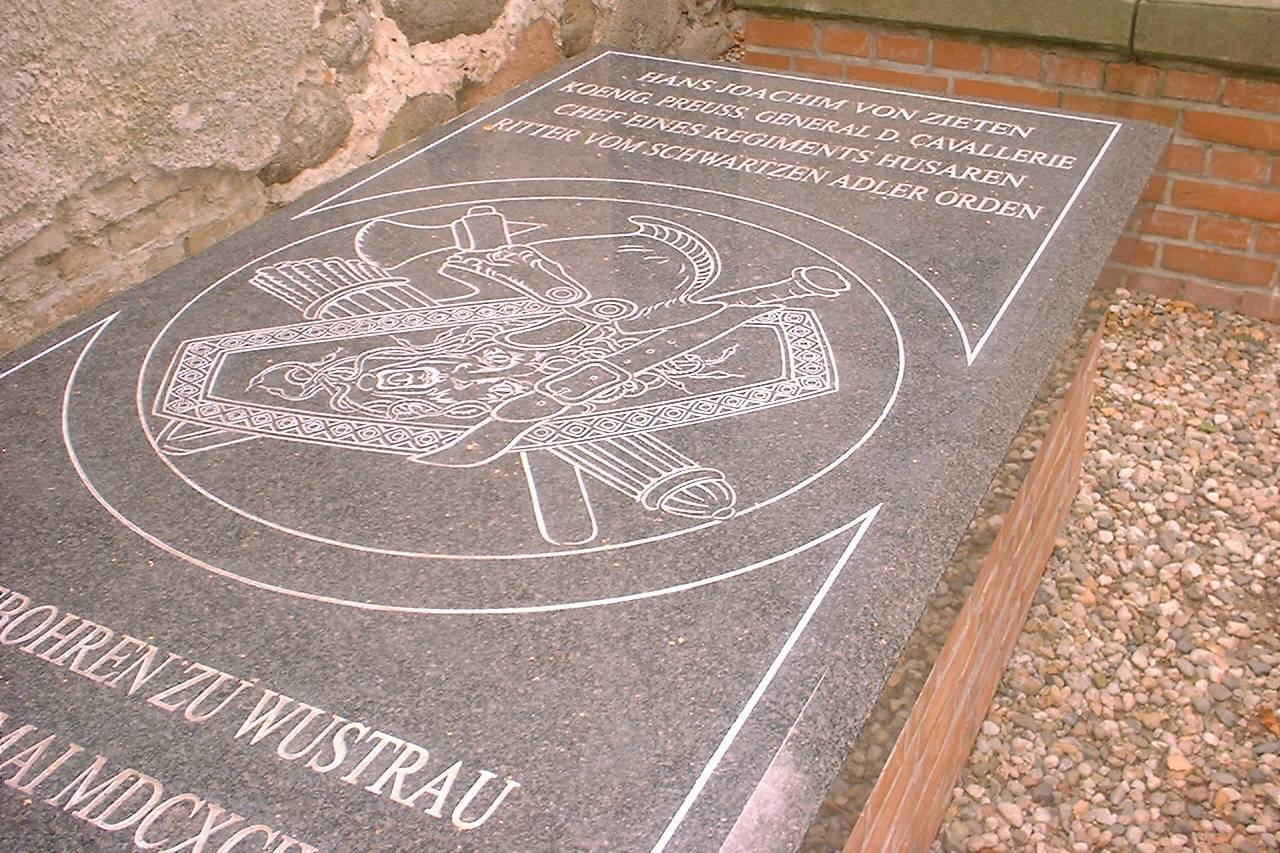
Zieten's grave in Fehrbellin-Wustrau

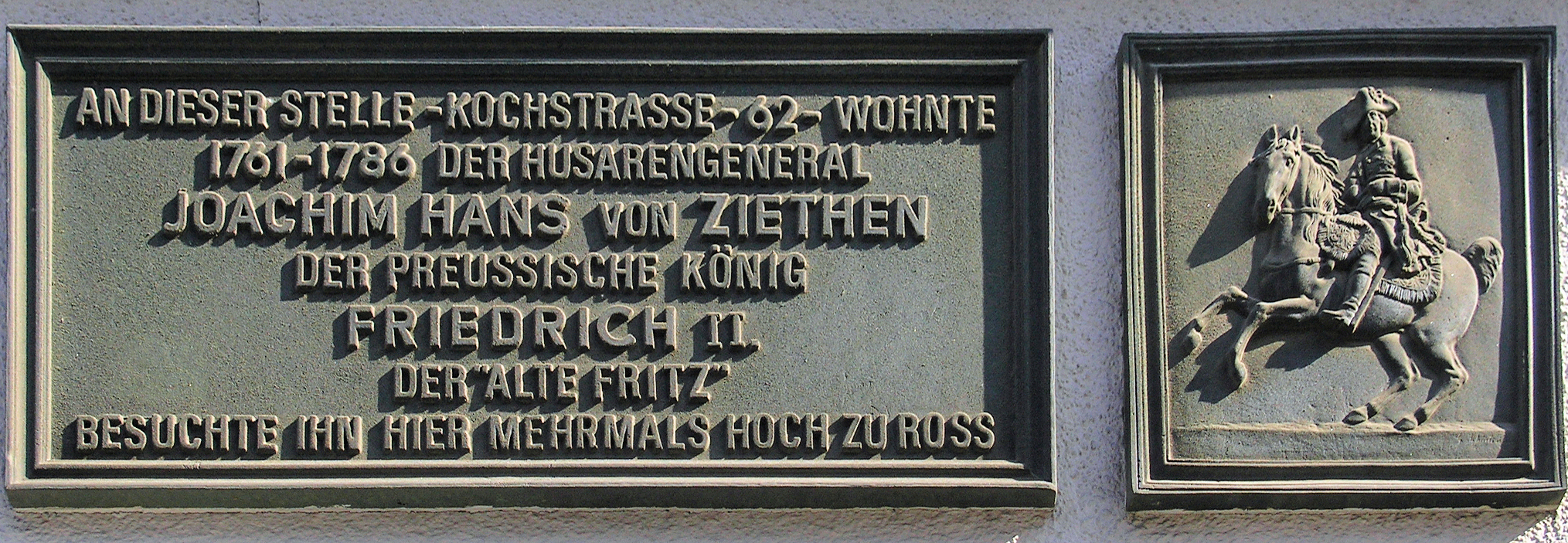
Zieten memorial in Kreuzberg (Berlin)

Zieten's name is on the Equestrian statue of Frederick the Great in Berlin (1851), and a full-sized relief of him stands at the corner of the statue; in addition, built between 1981 and 1983, the National People's Army barracks in Beelitz bore his name, as well as Zietenstraße in Düsseldorf and the Zietenring in Wiesbaden, a street in Lünen, also bear his name. From 1936 to 1945, Göttingen had the Zieten barracks and the Zieten Terrace; Pietrowice (German: Peterwitz) in the rural community of Głubczyce (German: Leobschütz) in Silesia was called Zietenbusch from 1936 to 1945.

== See also ==
- Statue of Hans Joachim von Zieten, Berlin
- SMS Zieten
