= Biała Górna railway station =

Railway station in south-western Poland

Biała Górna
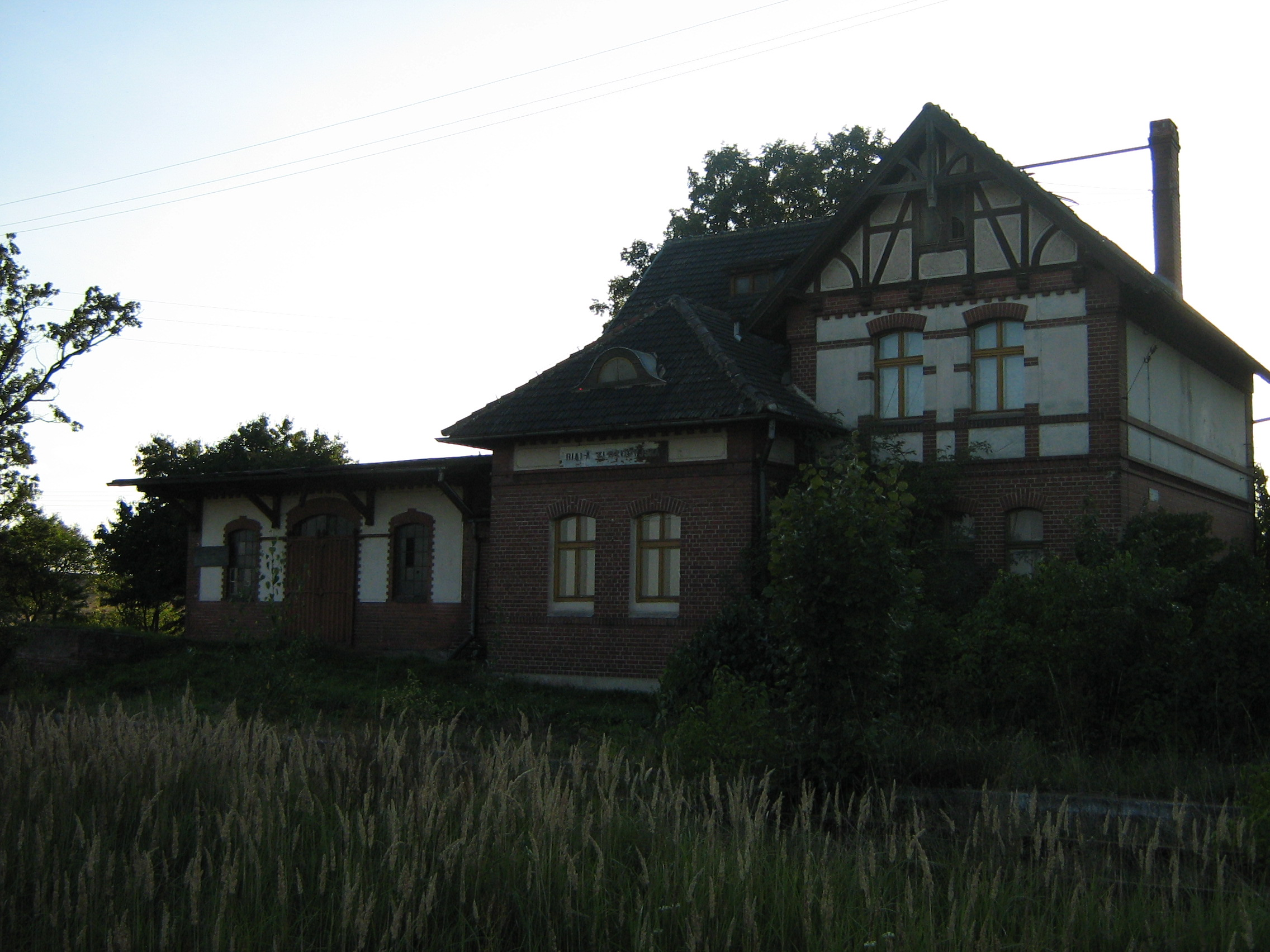
- Station building prior to its reopening

General information
- Location: Biała, Lower Silesian Voivodeship; Poland
- Coordinates: 51°17′49.7″N 15°55′41.5″E
- Owner: Polish State Railways
- Line: Złotoryja–Rokitki railway
- Platforms: 1

History
- Opened: 1 December 1906, re-opened 11 December 2022
- Former names: Bielau (Bez Liegnitz) (before 1945); Bieła (1945–1947); Bała Złotoryjska (1947–2022)

Services
Preceding station	KD	Following station
Chojnów towards Legnica	D13	Rokitki towards Chocianów
Chojnów towards Wrocław Główny	D14	Rokitki towards Forst (Lausitz)
Location
- Location within Poland Location within Lower Silesian Voivodeship

Biała Górna is a railway station on the Złotoryja–Rokitki railway in the village of Biała, Legnica County, within the Lower Silesian Voivodeship in south-western Poland.

== History ==
The station originally opened on 1 December 1906 as Bielau (Bez Liegnitz). After World War II, the area came under Polish administration. As a result, the station was taken over by Polish State Railways and was renamed to Bieła, and later to Biała Złotoryjska in 1947.

By 2002, the whole Złotoryja–Rokitki railway was closed. On 11 December 2022, the station re-opened as Biała Górna with the Złotoryja–Rokitki railway between Chojnów and Rokitki.

== Train services ==
The station is a request stop of Lower Silesian Railways services.

The station is served by the following services:

- Regional services (KD) Legnica - Chojnów - Chocianów
- Regional services (KD) Wrocław - Legnica - Żary - Forst
