= Acquisition of railways by the Lower Silesian Voivodeship =

The acquisition of railways by the Lower Silesian Voivodeship marshal's office involves the gradual, paid or unpaid transfer of railway lines previously managed by PKP Polskie Linie Kolejowe to the ownership of the Lower Silesian Voivodeship. By the end of 2022, 23 lines spanning approximately 240 km were acquired, with passenger services restored on five sections. The Lower Silesian Voivodeship is the only region in Poland systematically acquiring railway infrastructure. The infrastructure is managed by the Lower Silesian Roads and Railways Service in Wrocław. The acquired lines are operated by Lower Silesian Railways.

== Legal framework ==
The organization of regional transport is the responsibility of voivodeship marshals. Under Polish law, local government units may acquire railway lines that are not critical to the national railway network and serve only local purposes. Typically, these are lines with no or minimal train operations. Acquisition can be paid or unpaid. The process is governed by Article 39 of the Act on the Restructuring, Commercialization, and Privatization of the Polish State Railways, dated 8 September 2000.

== Regional railway characteristics ==
The Lower Silesian Voivodeship has a high rate of railway usage for local and regional transport. In 2018, the average resident made 9.4 rail trips annually, the 4th-highest in Poland. Regional and agglomeration services accounted for 88% of trips, with most occurring in the Wrocław metropolitan area. Two operators serve the region: Polregio and the voivodeship-owned Lower Silesian Railways, which is gradually displacing other operators in regional and local transport.

The voivodeship's policy focuses on restoring lost connections and expanding local services. Major obstacles include ongoing renovations and insufficient track capacity.

Compared to other Polish regions, Lower Silesia historically had the densest railway network, serving all cities until 1945, though the Eulengebirgsbahn declined in the 1930s. Post-war years saw the closure of lines deemed unprofitable. By 1989, 277 km of lines were closed, yet the region's railway network density remained the highest in Poland at 12.4 km per 100 km². By 2009, this dropped to 8.8 km per 100 km² after an additional 700 km of lines were closed since 1990.

== History ==
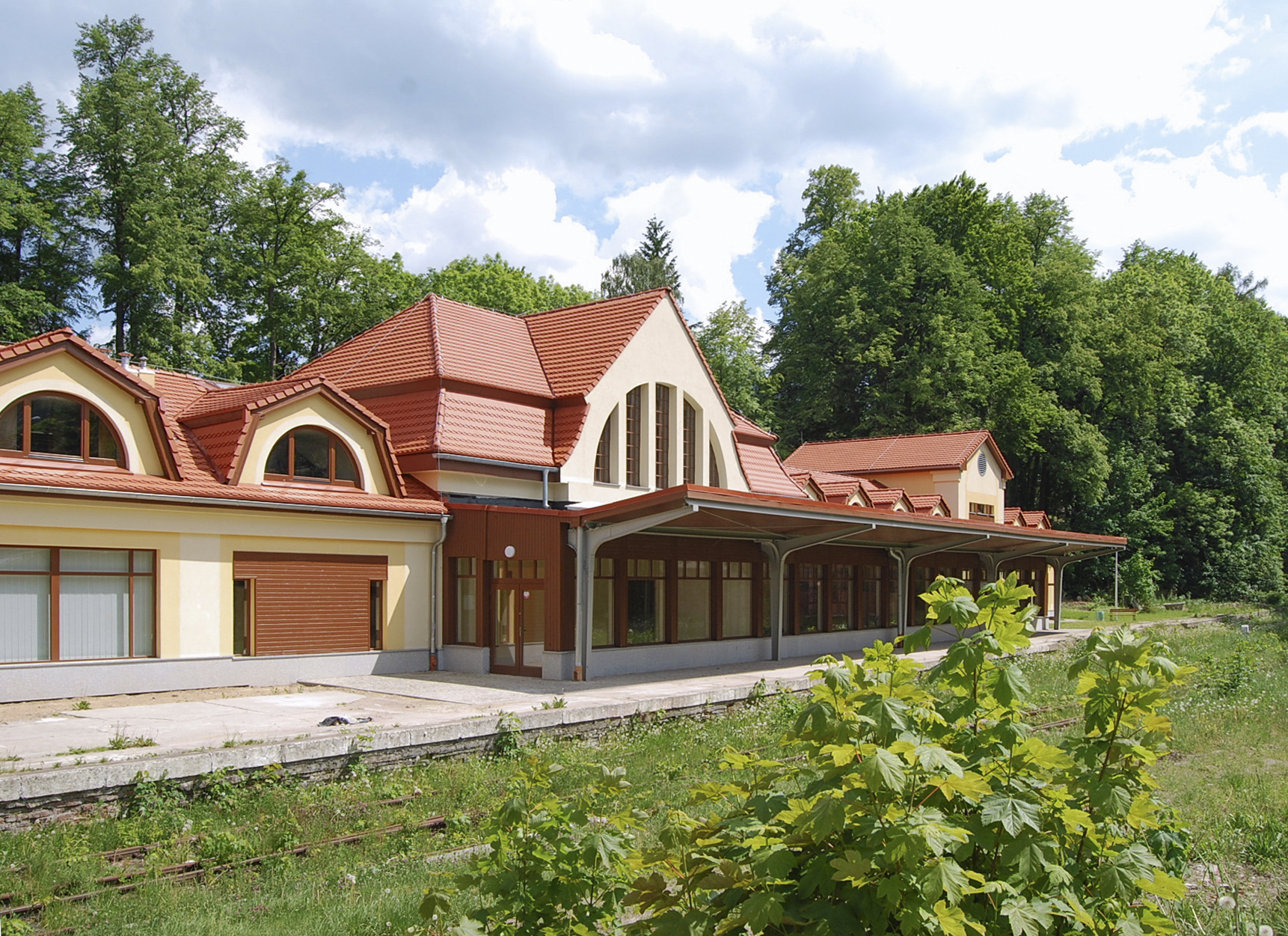
Revitalization of the Mysłakowice–Karpacz railway to Karpacz is a key priority for the Lower Silesian Voivodeship

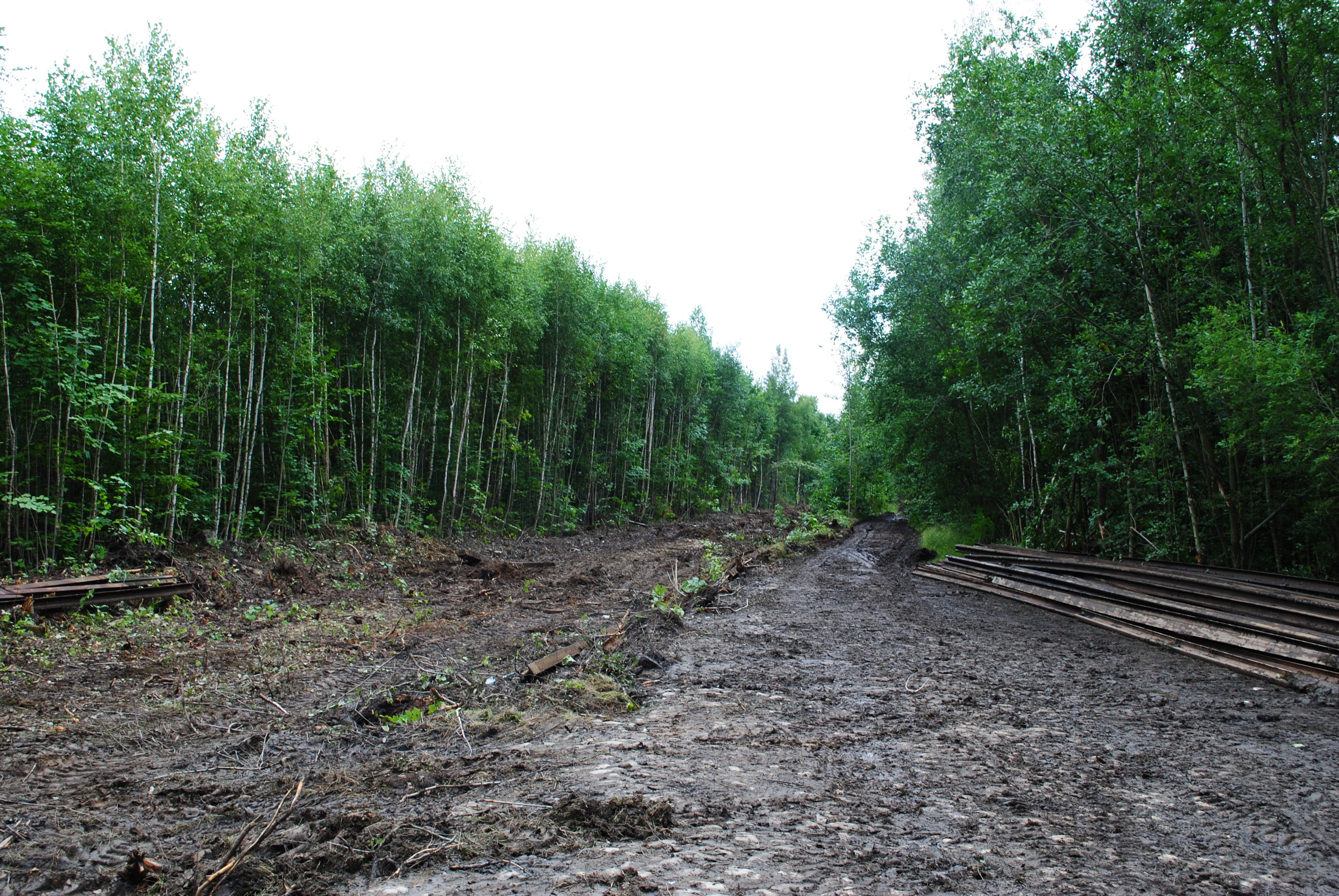
Section of the Mirsk–Świeradów Nadleśnictwo railway near Orłowice railway station under preparation for reconstruction, August 2021

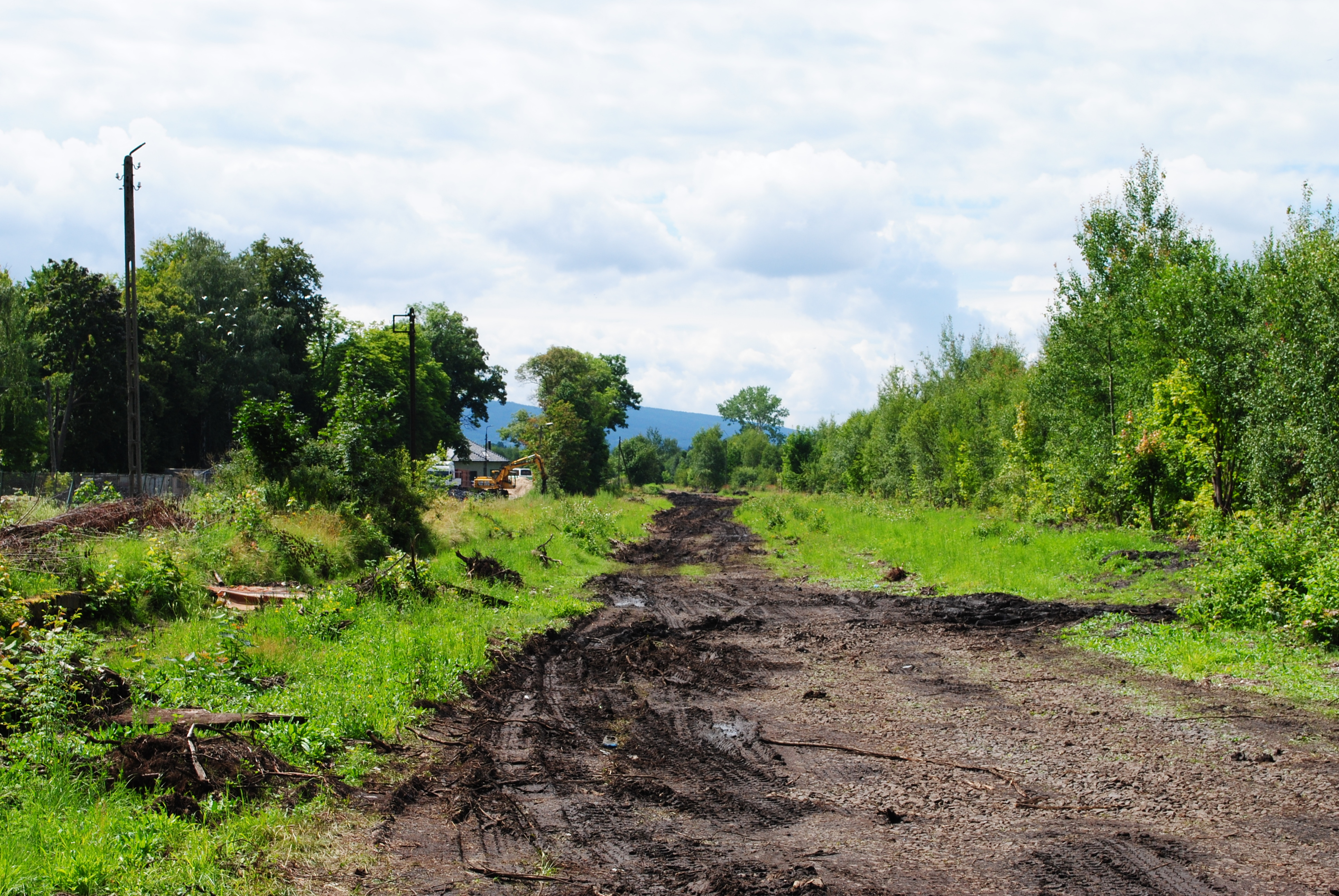
Section of the Mirsk–Świeradów Nadleśnictwo railway beyond the former Mirsk railway station during reconstruction preparations, August 2021

The 1990s saw widespread closures of unprofitable railway lines in Lower Silesia, which had a dense network. By 2000, around 40 local lines, such as Malczyce–Jawor, Wrocław Psie Pole–Trzebnica, and Dzierżoniów Śląski–Bielawa Zachodnia, were closed. These closures primarily affected small towns distant from major centers, exacerbating transport exclusion in Poland. Key reasons included deteriorating infrastructure and declining demand.

The first regional initiative to introduce local transport on Polish State Railways' infrastructure was the establishment of Lubuska Kolej Regionalna in 1991. The first attempt at railway line acquisition occurred in 2001 in Hajnówka County, where the county head planned to take over a section of Lewki–Białowieża railway from Hajnówka to Białowieża.

The first line acquired by the Lower Silesian Voivodeship was Wrocław Psie Pole–Trzebnica railway. Acquisition efforts began in 2007, and after a nine-month renovation, the line was reopened in 2009. The line became popular and overcrowded, leading to plans in 2022 for electrification and the construction of a passing loop.

In 2022, the Kolej Plus program was launched to support railway transport with government funds. The voivodeship submitted four projects, but the revitalization of the Kobierzyce–Piława Górna line, aimed at improving connectivity with Ząbkowice County, was rejected.

PKP Polskie Linie Kolejowe has been reluctant to transfer assets, leading to procedural disputes. In Lubusz Voivodeship, on Wolsztyn–Krzyż Rudno railway, only embankments were transferred without tracks, which were dismantled for planned bike paths. The transfer of the Dzierżoniów–Bielawa section was delayed but completed by 2022. Declaring intent to acquire a line prevents the Polish State Railways from dismantling it.

== Acquired railway lines ==
As of 28 March 2024, the voivodeship has acquired the following railway lines:

Line number	Section	Kilometer range	Status
283	Jelenia Góra – Lwówek Śląski	km 2.140 to km 33.316	Out of service
284	Jerzmanice-Zdrój – Lwówek Śląski	km 24.444 to km 48.157	Out of service
291	Szczawno-Zdrój – Sobięcin	km 3.400 to km 17.140	Out of service
302	Strzegom – Marciszów	km 44.835 to km 73.040	Out of service
303	Duninów – Przemków Odlewnia	km 7.880 to km 31.100 (10.970)	Partially active
308	Pisarzowice – Jelenia Góra	km 7.945 to km 37.818	Under construction
310	Kobierzyce – Piława Górna	km 0.174 to km 38.645	Under construction
311	Szklarska Poręba Górna – State Border	km 29.844 to km 43.138	In service
312	Wojcieszów – Nowy Kościół	km 16.090 to km 33.430	Out of service
316	Chojnów – Rokitki	km 21.832 to km 26.755	In service
317	Gryfów Śląski – Świeradów-Zdrój	km 0.668 to km 16.544	In service
327	Srebrna Góra – Bielawa Zachodnia	km 12.380 to km 28.295	Under construction
304	Kondratowice – Łagiewniki Dzierżoniowskie	km 46.200 to km 51.139	Out of service
320	Ciepłowody – Ciepłowody	km 9.982 to km 13.282	Out of service
322	Kłodzko Nowe – Stronie Śląskie	km 9.700 to km 24.622	Tender issued
323	Nowa Wieś Grodziska – Nowa Wieś Grodziska	km 0.303 to km 2.065	Out of service
326	Wrocław Zakrzów – Trzebnica	km 1.260 to km 19.903	In service
327	Ścinawka Średnia – Radków	km 6.248 to km 14.255	Out of service
327	Wolibórz – Nowa Ruda Słupiec	km –5.380 to km 0.000	Out of service
331	Roztoka – Roztoka	km 13.332 to km 14.638	Out of service
335	Henryków – Ciepłowody	km –0.279 to km 10.080	Out of service
340	Mysłakowice – Karpacz	km –0.247 to km 7.055	In service
341	Bielawa Zachodnia – Dzierżoniów	km –0.530 to km 5.118	In service
345	Kamienna Góra – Pisarzowice	km 1.780 to km 3.040	Tender issued
372	Bojanowo – Góra Śląska	km 0.600 to km 15.305	Out of service

=== Duninów–Przemków Odlewnia railway ===
Rokitki–Chocianów railway from Rokitki to Niegosławice was operational since 1890 but began deteriorating in the 1990s. Passenger services on the Chocianów–Niegosławice section ceased in 1991, followed by freight services on the Przemków Odlewnia–Niegosławice section in 1994. In 2000, passenger services on the Rokitki–Chocianów section and freight services on the Chocianów–Przemków Odlewnia section were discontinued. By 2005, the final freight section from Duninów to Chocianów was closed, leaving only a 6 km freight section from Rokitki to Duninów for the 4th Regional Logistics Base.

On 24 January 2019, the voivodeship approved the acquisition of the Duninów–Chocianów section, formalized on 16 December 2020. Renovation took 14 months, and passenger services resumed on 11 December 2022 with the Legnica–Chocianów route.

In December 2023, the Chocianów–Przemków Odlewnia section was acquired, with track clearing starting soon after. Passenger services to Przemków are planned for late 2025, with further revitalization of the Przemków Odlewnia–Niegosławice section targeted for the 2026/2027 timetable to enable Legnica–Głogów connections via Przemków, Niegosławice, Gaworzyce, and Żukowice. A tender for the Chocianów–Przemków Odlewnia section was announced on 14 March 2025.

=== Kobierzyce–Piława Górna railway ===
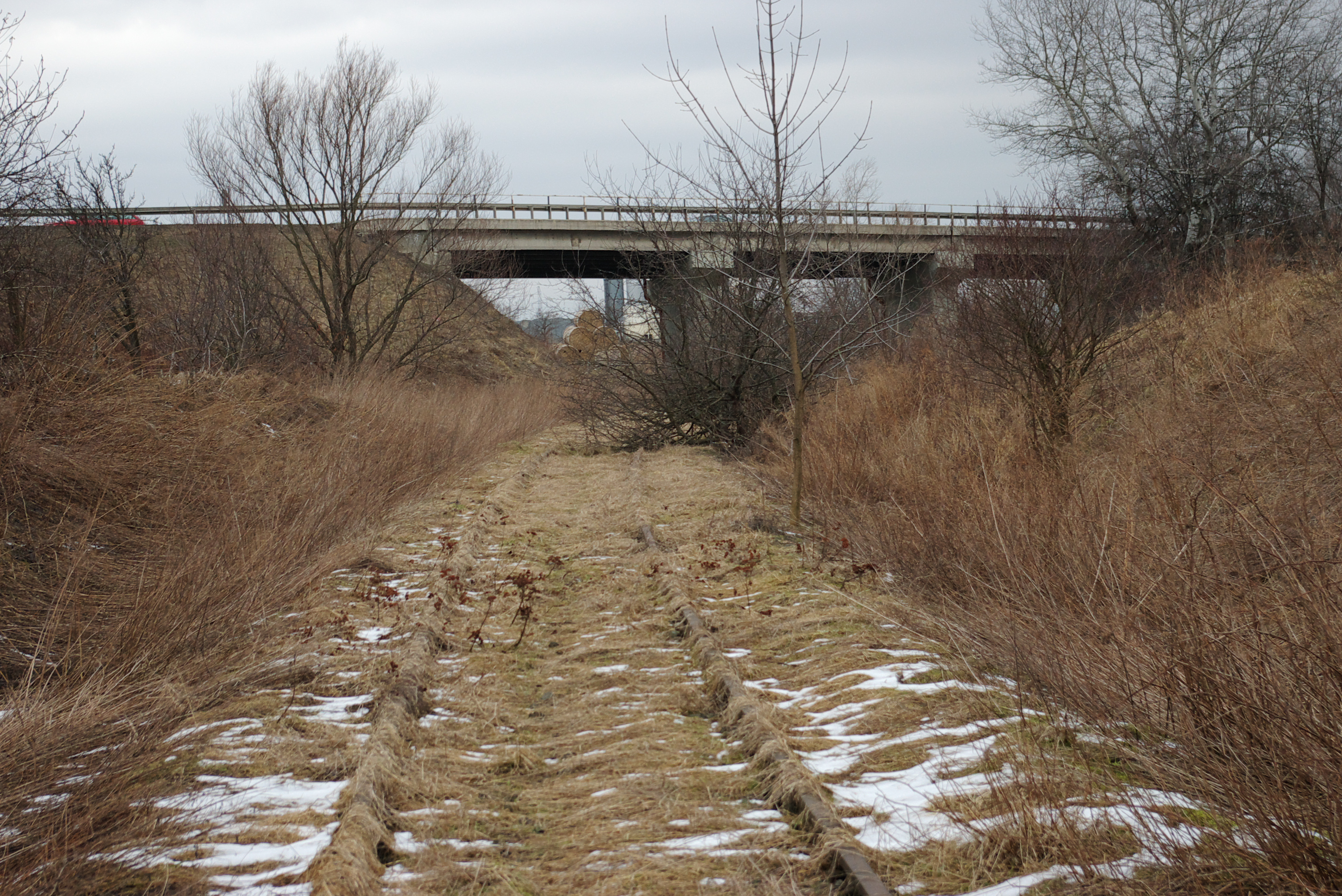
Kobierzyce–Piława Górna railway near Niemcza, acquired by the voivodeship

Kobierzyce–Piława Górna railway connects Kobierzyce to Piława Górna on the Sudeten line, linking Wrocław with Ząbkowice County. Passenger services ceased in 1996, and all rail traffic stopped a few years later. In 2019, the voivodeship acquired the railway from the Polish State Railways. An attempt to include the railway in the Kolej Plus program for renovation by PKP Polskie Linie Kolejowe failed in April 2022. Nevertheless, the voivodeship proceeded, announcing a tender in December 2022 for works between Łagiewniki Dzierżoniowskie and Piława Górna. The tender required increasing the maximum passenger train speed to 80 km/h, meeting third-class railway standards, and upgrading level crossings with signaling. Plans included rebuilding the Łagiewniki Dzierżoniowskie, Niemcza, Wilków, and Przerzeczyn railway stations, and adding a new stop in Niemcza. Completion was initially set for 31 May 2024, but works were delayed.

The Łagiewniki–Piława Górna section was expected to be operational by December 2024, with the Kobierzyce–Łagiewniki section planned for the 2025/2026 timetable.

=== Szklarska Poręba Górna–State Border railway ===
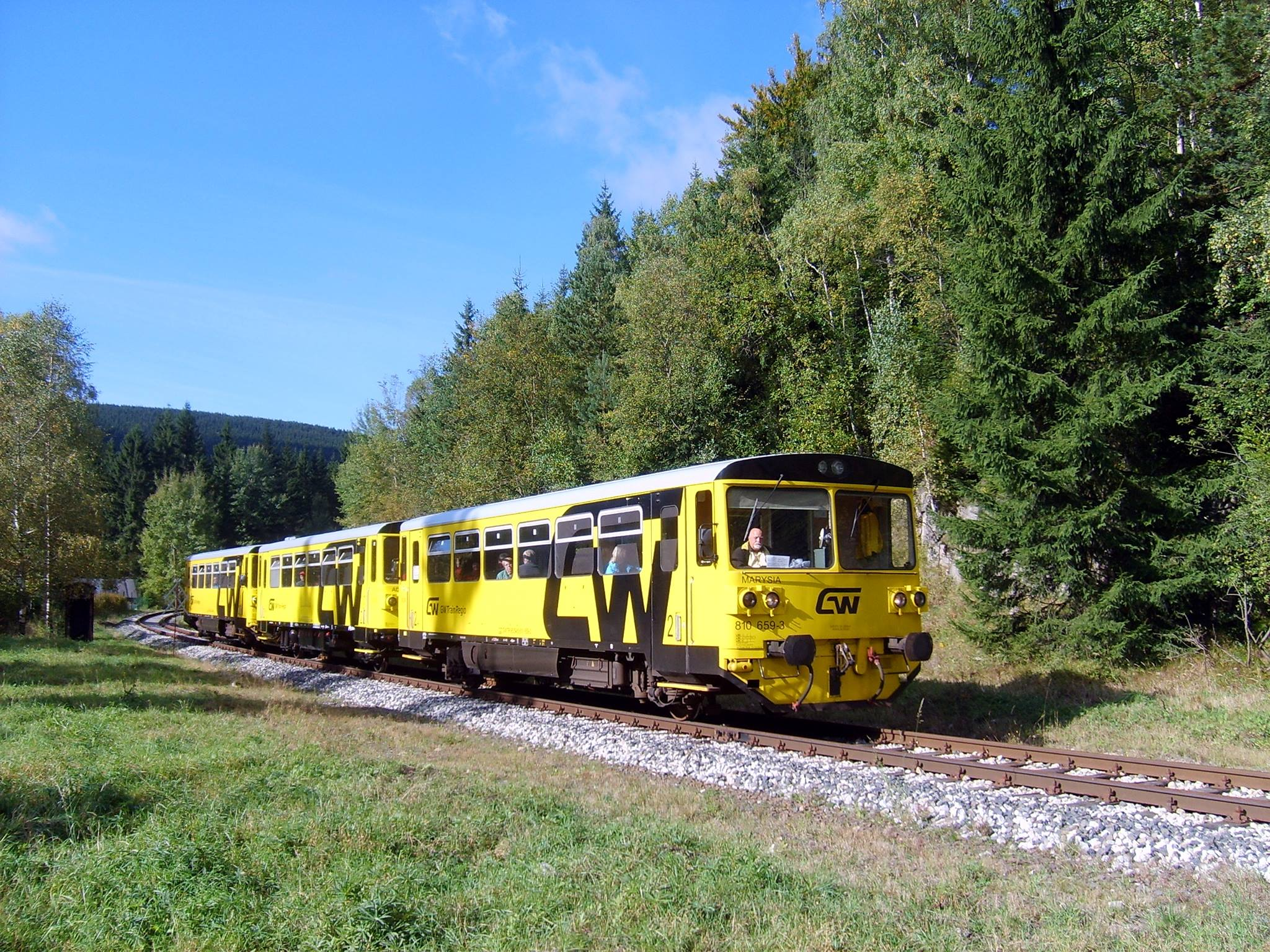
GW Train Regio train with a series 810 diesel car in Szklarska Poręba in 2010

The Szklarska Poręba Górna–State Border section is a 13 km non-electrified segment of Izera railway, running through the Jizera Mountains. Until 1945, it was electrified, but the German traction network was dismantled by the Red Army and taken to the Soviet Union as war reparations under an 8 July 1945 agreement. Passenger services on the Szklarska Poręba Huta–State Border section were suspended in 1947, and on the Szklarska Poręba Górna–Szklarska Poręba Huta section in 1957.

Renovation began ceremonially on 8 May 2009, extending from Szklarska Poręba to the Polish border and onward to Kořenov. The Wrocław-based firm Dolkom S.A. undertook the work, estimated at 14 million PLN. Originally planned for completion by 30 November 2009, delays due to a harsh winter pushed completion to mid-June 2010. The line was ceremonially reopened on 2 July 2010, with regular services (initially to Jakuszyce) starting the next day. In 2010, the timetable included six daily round trips between Kořenov and Szklarska Poręba Górna.

=== Chojnów–Rokitki railway ===
The 8 km section of Chojnów–Rokitki railway from Chojnów to Rokitki was active from 1906 to 2002. The Lower Silesian Voivodeship Marshal's Office repeatedly sought to acquire this section from PKP Polskie Linie Kolejowe. In 2014, the line was slated for dismantling, but this was averted.

On 24 January 2019, the voivodeship approved the acquisition of the Chojnów–Rokitki section, excluding short segments at the Chojnów and Rokitki stations, formalized on 29 April 2019. Revitalization works took place between 2021 and 2022, and passenger services resumed on 11 December 2022 with the Legnica–Chocianów route.

=== Gryfów Śląski–Świeradów-Zdrój railway ===
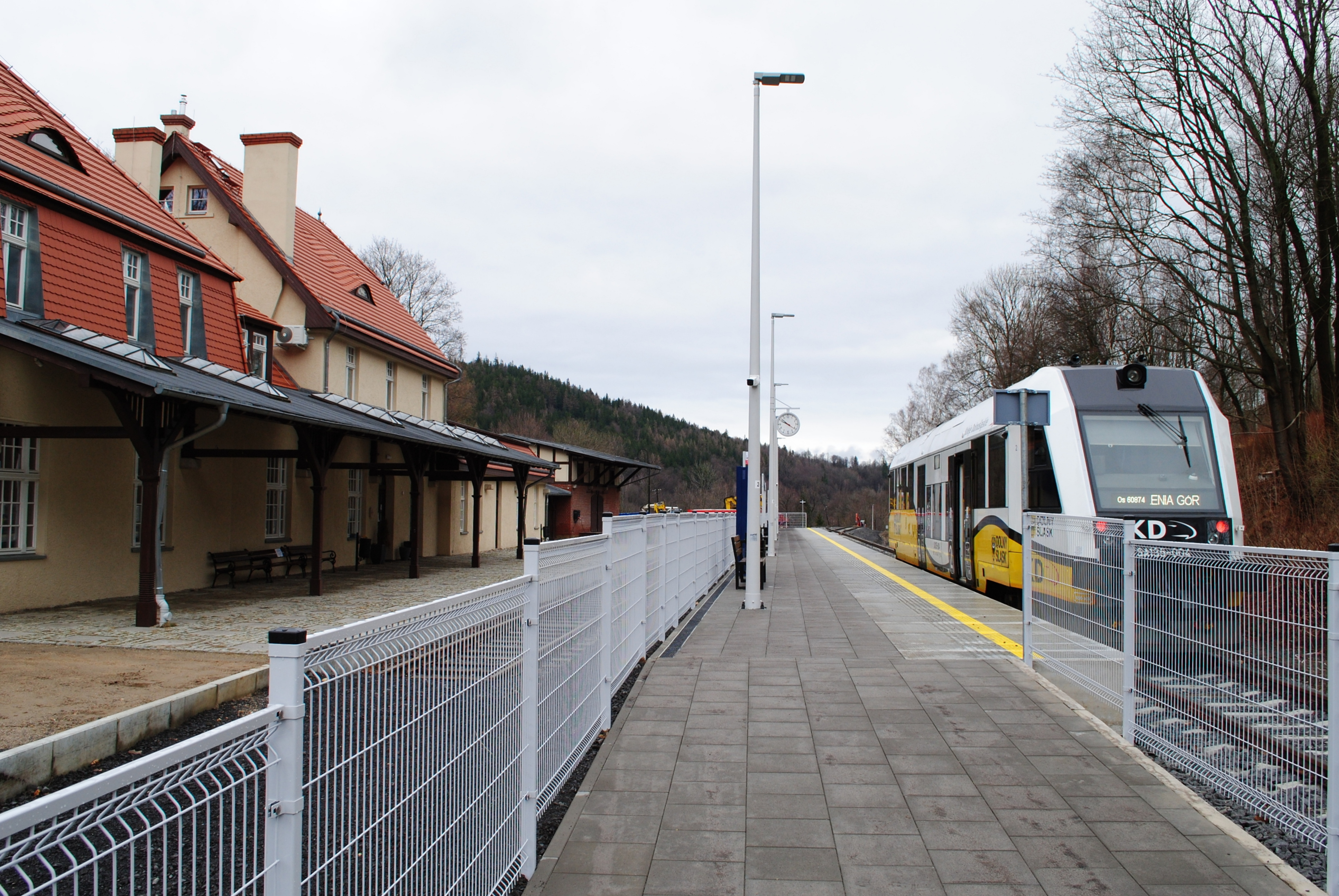
SA135 railbus at Świeradów-Zdrój in February 2024

The railway from Gryfów Śląski to Świeradów-Zdrój was originally divided into two railways: Legnica–Jerzmanice-Zdrój railway for the Gryfów Śląski–Mirsk section and Mirsk–Świeradów Nadleśnictwo railway for Mirsk–Świeradów-Zdrój Nadleśnictwo. Until 1945, it was known as the Izera Mountains Railway due to its route near the Zajęcznik peak. Passenger services from Gryfów Śląski to Mirsk began in 1884, extended to Świeradów-Zdrój in 1909. Passenger services ceased on 11 February 1996, and freight services ended in 1998. In 1999, the Gryfów Śląski–Mirsk section was redesignated as Gryfów Śląski–Świeradów-Zdrój railway.

Revitalization took approximately 18 months, costing 60 million PLN, with contributions of 5 million PLN from Świeradów-Zdrój and 1 million PLN each from Mirsk and Gryfów Śląski. The railway was ceremonially reopened on 7 December 2023, with passenger services starting on 10 December. Critics argued the railway would be unprofitable, favoring a bike path instead. However, Lower Silesian Railways reported over 6,000 passengers in December 2023 and 6,640 in January 2024, averaging about 200 daily passengers.

=== Kłodzko Nowe–Stronie Śląskie railway ===
The railway from Kłodzko to Stronie Śląskie, opened in 1897, operated passenger services until 2004 and freight services until 2007 on the Ołdrzychowice OMYA–Stronie Śląskie section.

Acquisition efforts by Lower Silesian Roads and Railways Service faced ownership issues, resolved on 14 September 2023, when the railway was taken under 30-year management with an option for permanent acquisition.

Pending acquisition, Lower Silesian Railways launched a temporary bus service in September 2022 between Kłodzko and Stronie Śląskie, integrated into the train timetable. In 2024, the voivodeship announced plans to resume rail services to Stronie Śląskie in 2026. A tender for revitalization was issued on 29 January 2025.

=== Wrocław Zakrzów–Trzebnica railway ===
The 19 km Wrocław Zakrzów–Trzebnica section of Wrocław Psie Pole–Trzebnica railway, within the Wrocław metropolitan area, connects Wrocław to Trzebnica. Opened in 1886, it operated passenger services until 1991 and freight until 1999, except for the Wrocław Psie Pole–Wrocław Zakrzów section, which remained with PKP Polskie Linie Kolejowe.

In 2007, the voivodeship acquired the railway from PKP Polskie Linie Kolejowe and began revitalization. Passenger services resumed on 20 September 2009. In 2024, plans were made for a passing loop and electrification funding was secured.

=== Kamienna Góra–Jelenia Góra and Mysłakowice–Karpacz railways ===
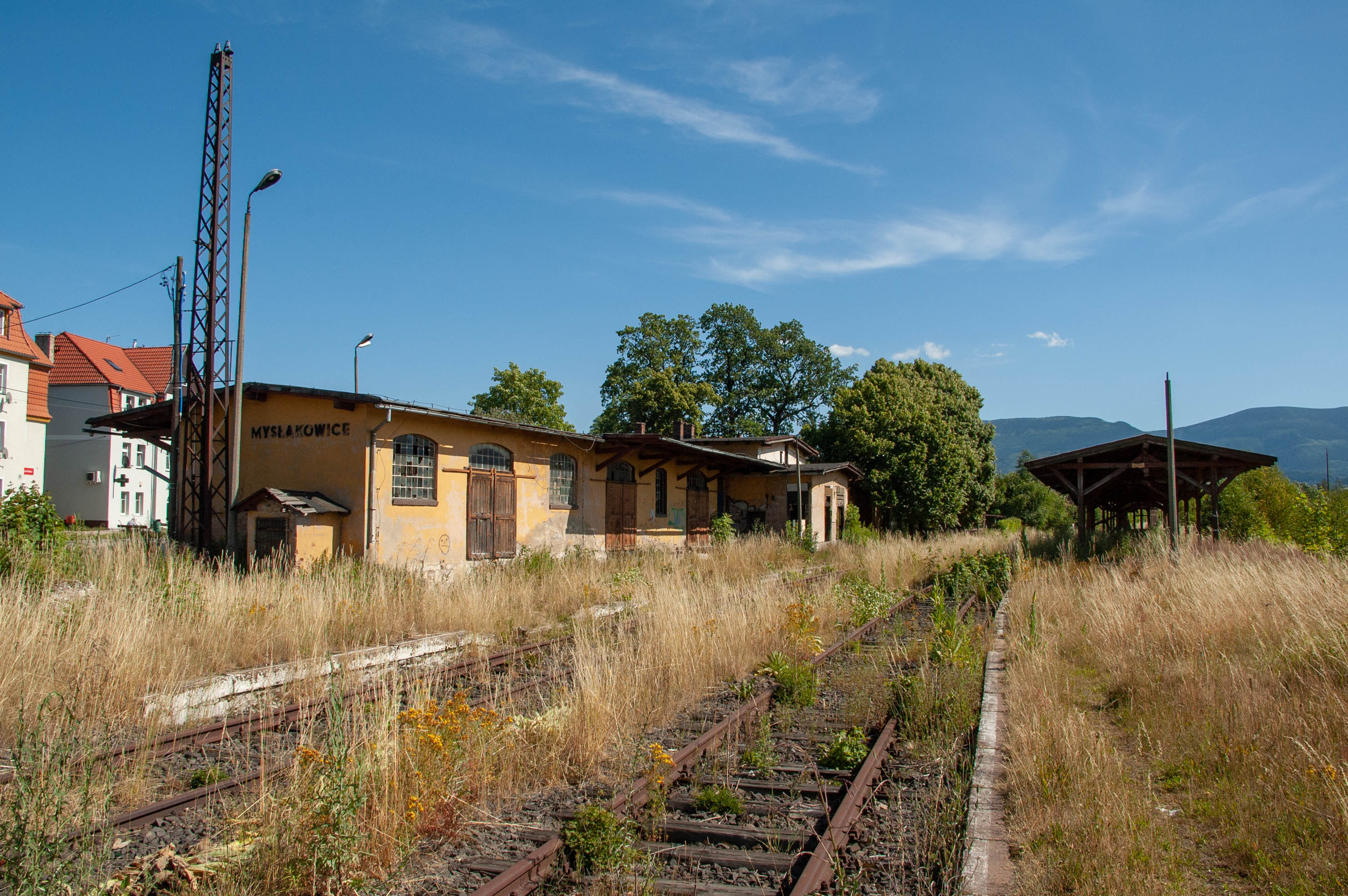
Station building of Mysłakowice in 2019

The railway to Karpacz and Kowary operated from 1895 to 1986 for Kowary and until 2000 for Karpacz. Pre-war electrification was dismantled in 1945 by Soviet forces south of the Wałbrzych–Jelenia Góra railway. A 2020 feasibility study for Opole Wschodnie–Opole Port railway, Kamienna Góra–Jelenia Góra railway, and Mysłakowice–Karpacz railway included re-electrification, later abandoned. These railways were acquired on 8 June 2021. Renovation began with the Jelenia Góra–Mysłakowice section, funded by the Polish Deal program, with Infrakol from Jawor as the contractor. Works involved removing 3,800 trees, dismantling old tracks, and replacing ballast. Plans remain for the Mysłakowice–Ogorzelec–Pisarzowice–Kamienna Góra section. Kowary secured 4.5 million PLN from the Polish Deal for station renovation, including a tourist information center, the Kowary Craft Museum, and a library.

A tender for preparatory works on the Mysłakowice–Karpacz railway was issued on 15 December 2022, receiving 11 bids. Construction began in March 2023. The line was officially opened on the 13 June 2025, with regular passenger operations running from Jelenia Góra station commencing on the 15th.

=== Srebrna Góra–Bielawa–Dzierżoniów Śląski railway ===
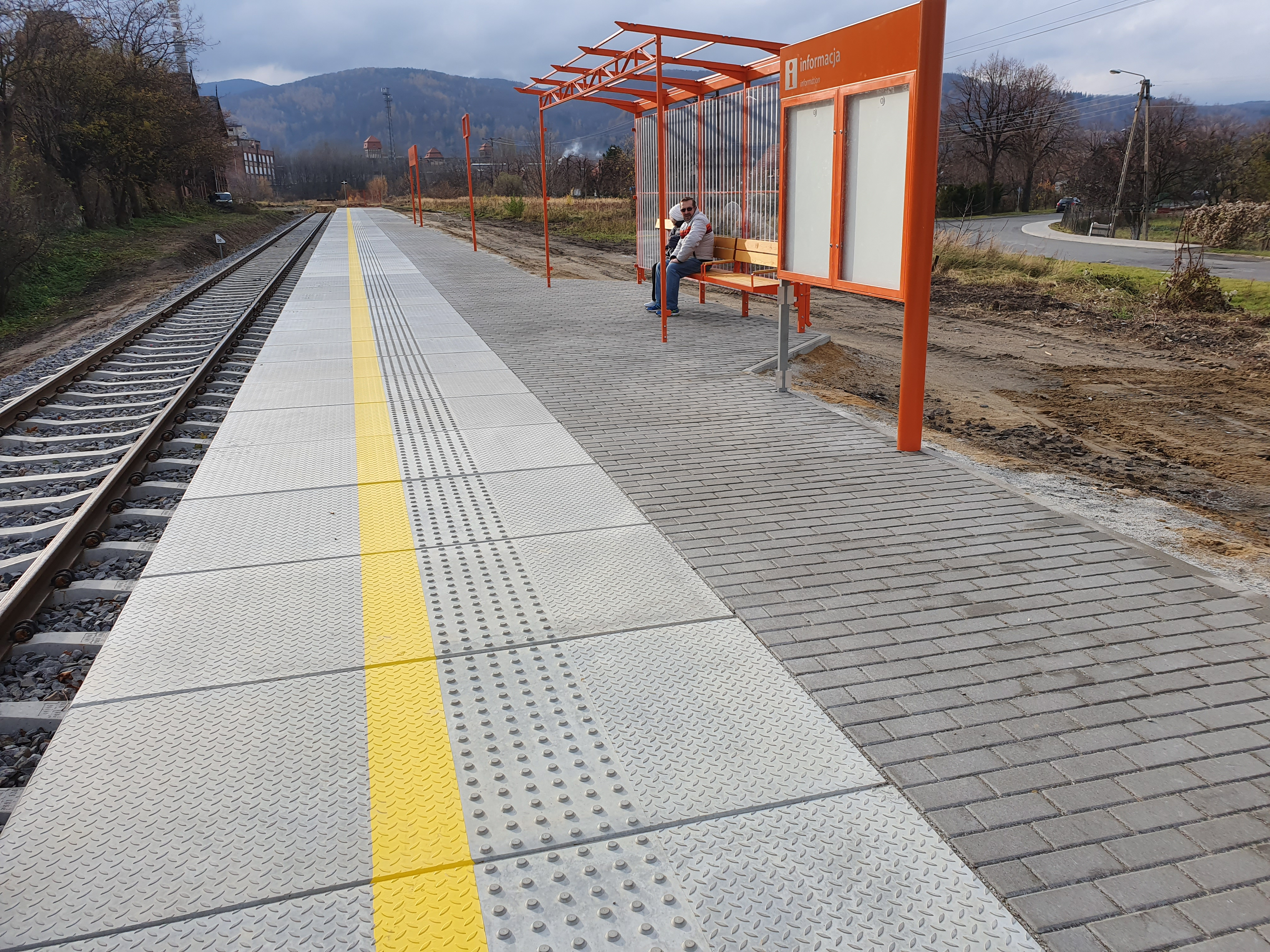
Bielawa Zachodnia

The Dzierżoniów Śląski–Bielawa Zachodnia railway from Dzierżoniów to Bielawa was acquired by the voivodeship in late 2017. Passenger services were intermittently suspended from 26 May 1962, ceasing permanently on 21 May 1977, with freight services ending in 2001. Within 100 days, a tender was issued for revitalization, with a contract signed on 22 March 2018. Works included track resurfacing, upgrading four level crossings, and modernizing the Bielawa Centralna and Bielawa Zachodnia railway stations. The 5 km section cost 15 million PLN. Despite a planned September 2019 reopening, passenger services resumed on 15 December 2019, costing 14 million PLN. A small protest occurred at the opening due to the closure of an unauthorized crossing.

The Bielawa Zachodnia–Srebrna Góra railway operated passenger services until 1977 and freight until 1987. In May 2021, Lower Silesian Roads and Railways Service issued a tender for design and preparatory works. In April 2024, a tender was announced for revitalizing the Nowa Bielawa–Bielawa Zachodnia section, including a new Bielawa Camping Sudety station. Works began in early 2025. A tender for the remaining Srebrna Góra section was issued on 28 January 2025.

== Supreme Audit Office's report ==
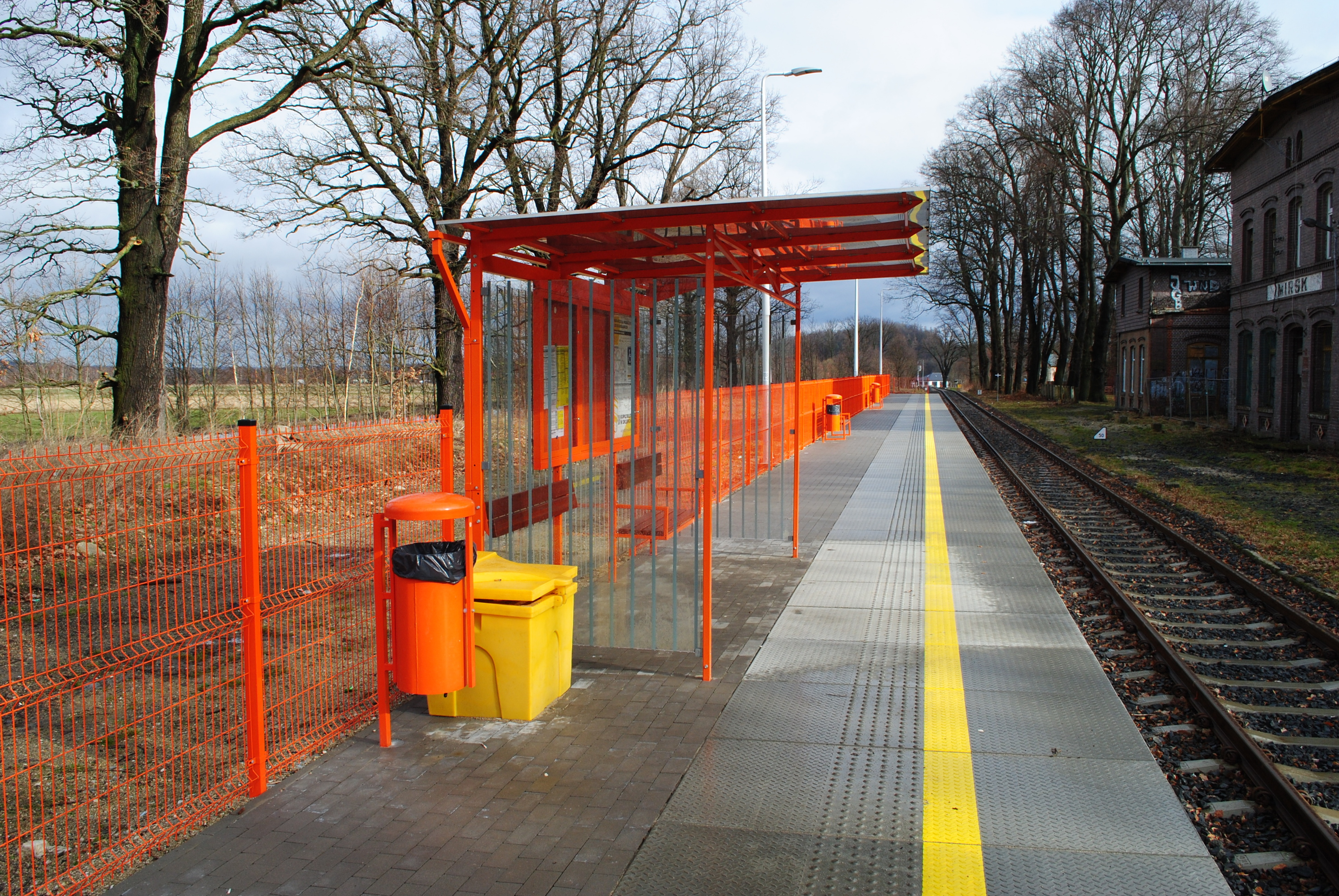
Railway stations on railways acquired by the marshal's office feature orange decor

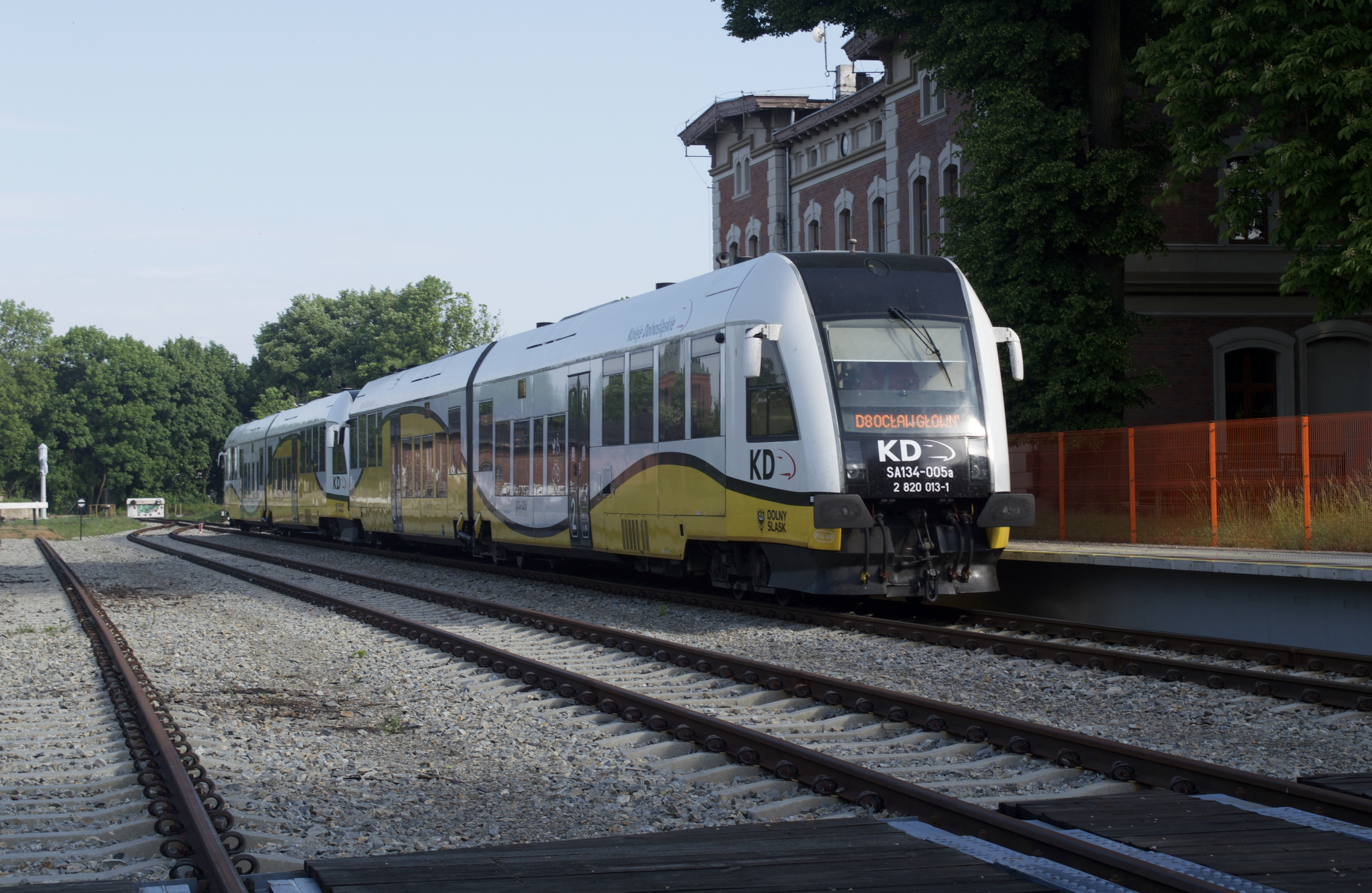
The Wrocław Psie Pole–Trzebnica railway was the first acquired by the Lower Silesian Voivodeship

In January 2022, the Supreme Audit Office released a report, Activities of the Lower Silesian Voivodeship Government to Restore Railway Connections. It criticized the restoration of passenger services on only three of the 23 acquired railways, covering 37.6 km, and highlighted high acquisition costs of 8.196 million PLN annually. The report estimated a 52-year timeline for full reactivation at the current pace, citing a lack of profitability analysis and inadequate consideration of residents' needs. The Supreme Audit Office recommended agreements with PKP Polskie Linie Kolejowe for revitalized railways and urged the Ministry of Infrastructure to conduct a comprehensive transport plan analysis.

Lower Silesian officials labeled the report "nonsense", accusing the Supreme Audit Office of unreliable data analysis, ignoring ongoing works on 50 km of railways within 1–3 years of acquisition, the severe degradation of the region's railway infrastructure, and the limited funding for Lower Silesian Railways.

== Challenges ==
Acquisition faces obstacles. The Kłodzko Nowe–Stronie Śląskie railway has complex ownership, split between Polish State Railways and PKP Polskie Linie Kolejowe, requiring lengthy legal processes. An interpellation by MP Monika Wielichowska was ineffective, but the issue was resolved with the railway's 30-year management transfer on 14 September 2023. Similar issues affect the Jelenia Góra–Lwówek Śląski railway, exacerbated by the poor condition of the Pilchowice Lake railway bridge.

== See also ==
- Lower Silesian Agglomeration Railway
