= Chocianów railway station =

Railway station in south-western Poland

Chocianów
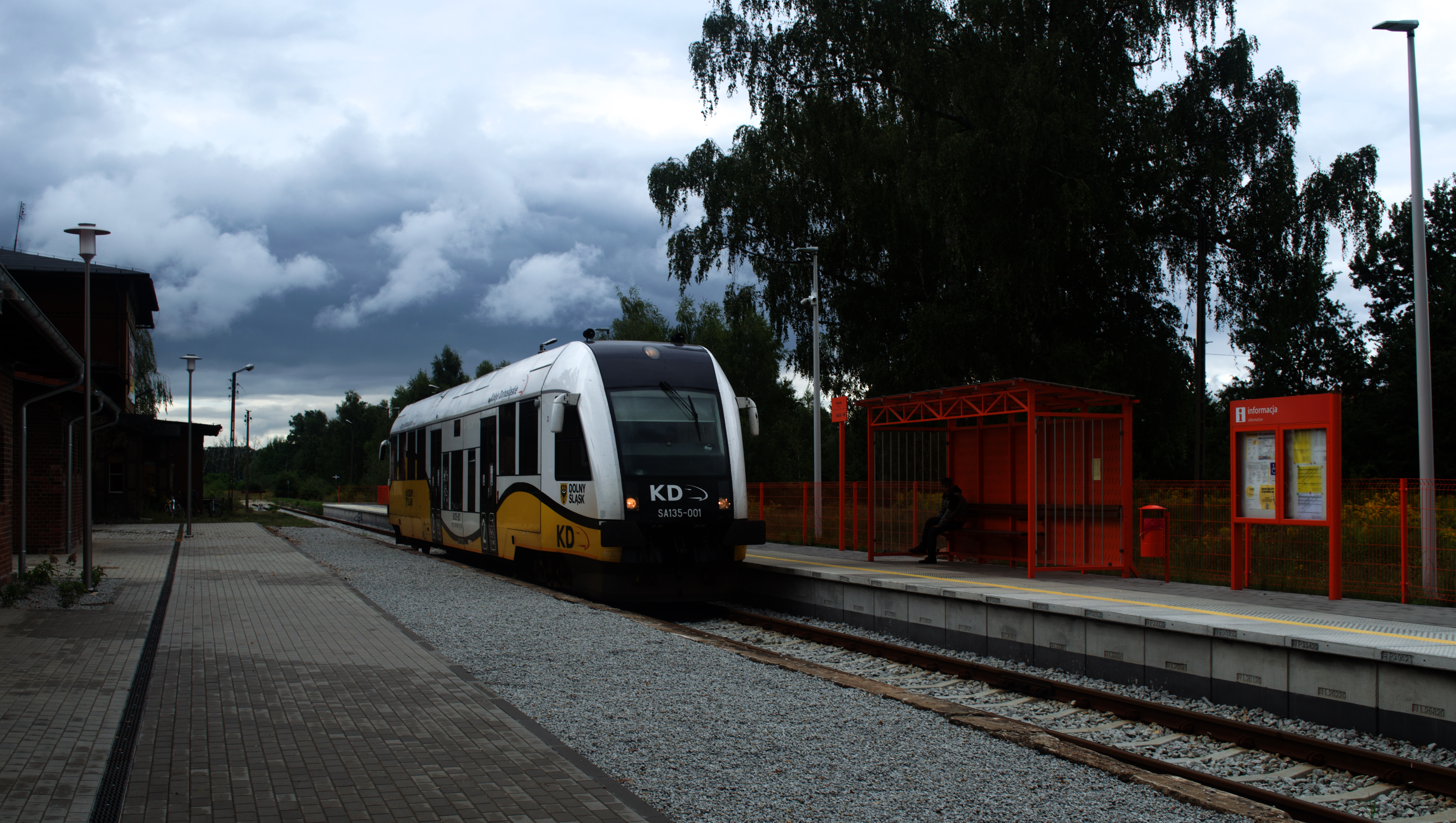
- Lower Silesian Railways railbus SA135 bound for Legnica

General information
- Location: Chocianów, Lower Silesian Voivodeship; Poland
- Coordinates: 51°24′59.1″N 15°54′43.0″E
- Owner: Polish State Railways
- Lines: Złotoryja–Rokitki railway; Lubin–Chocianów railway (closed)
- Platforms: 1

History
- Opened: 1 October 1890, re-opened 11 December 2022
- Former names: Kotzenau (before 1945)

Services
Preceding station	KD	Following station
Rokitki towards Legnica	D13	Terminus
Rokitki towards Wrocław Główny	D14	Modła towards Forst (Lausitz)
Location
- Location within Poland Location within Lower Silesian Voivodeship

Chocianów (German: Kotzenau) is a railway station in the town of Chocianów, Polkowice County, within the Lower Silesian Voivodeship in south-western Poland.

== History ==
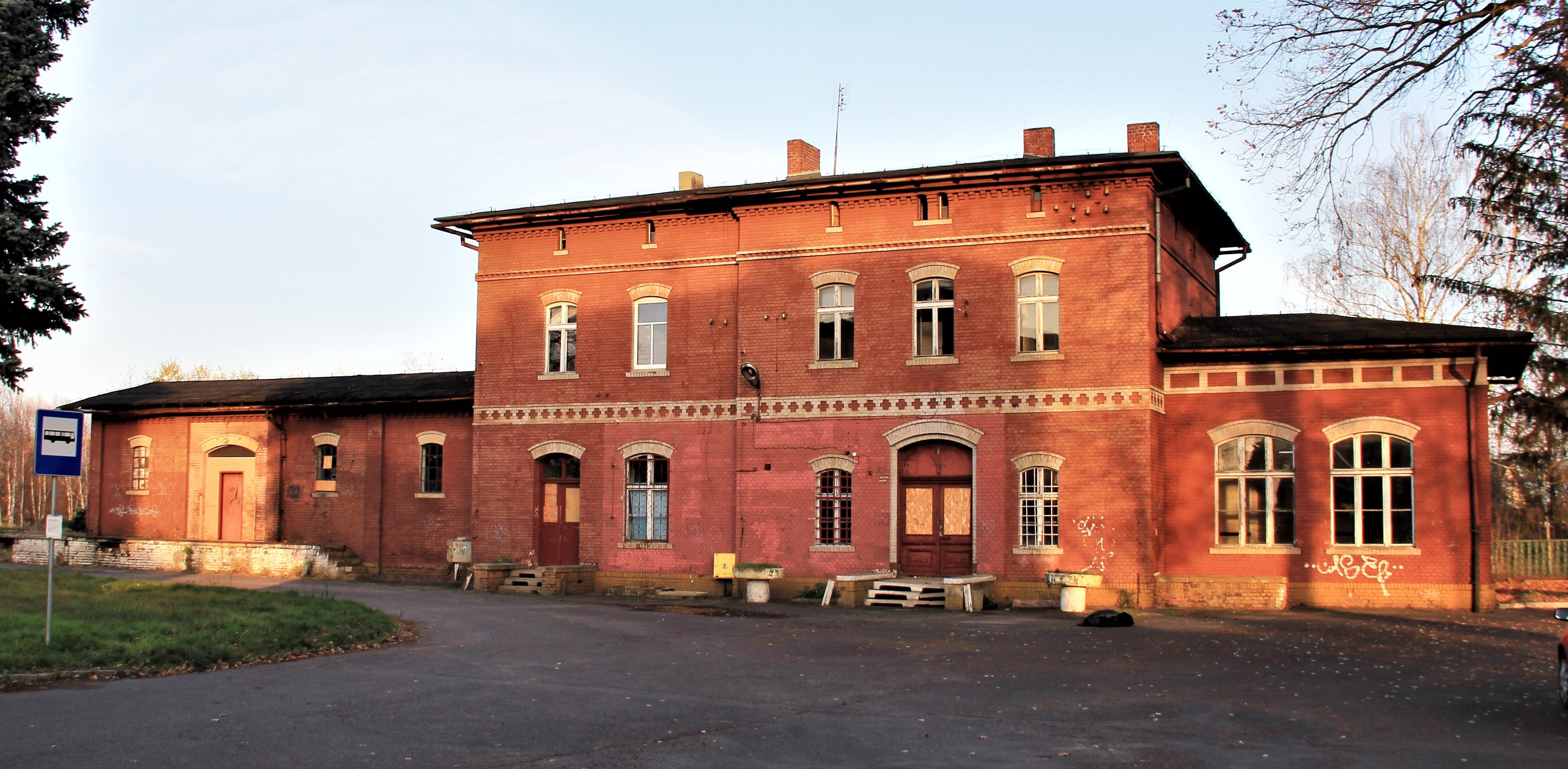
Station building prior to the station's re-opening

The station originally opened on 1 October 1890 as Kotzenau. After World War II, the area came under Polish administration. As a result, the station was taken over by Polish State Railways and was renamed to Chocianów.

In 1917, the Lubin–Chocianów railway was extended to the station. The line was closed in 1987 and later dismantled in 1992.

By 2002, the whole Złotoryja–Rokitki railway was closed. On 11 December 2022, the station re-opened with the Złotoryja–Rokitki railway between Chojnów and Rokitki.

== Train services ==
- Regional services (KD) Legnica - Chojnów - Chocianów
- Regional services (KD) Wrocław - Legnica - Żary - Forst
