= Lotte Stam-Beese =

Dutch architect, photographer, and urban planner

Lotte Beese
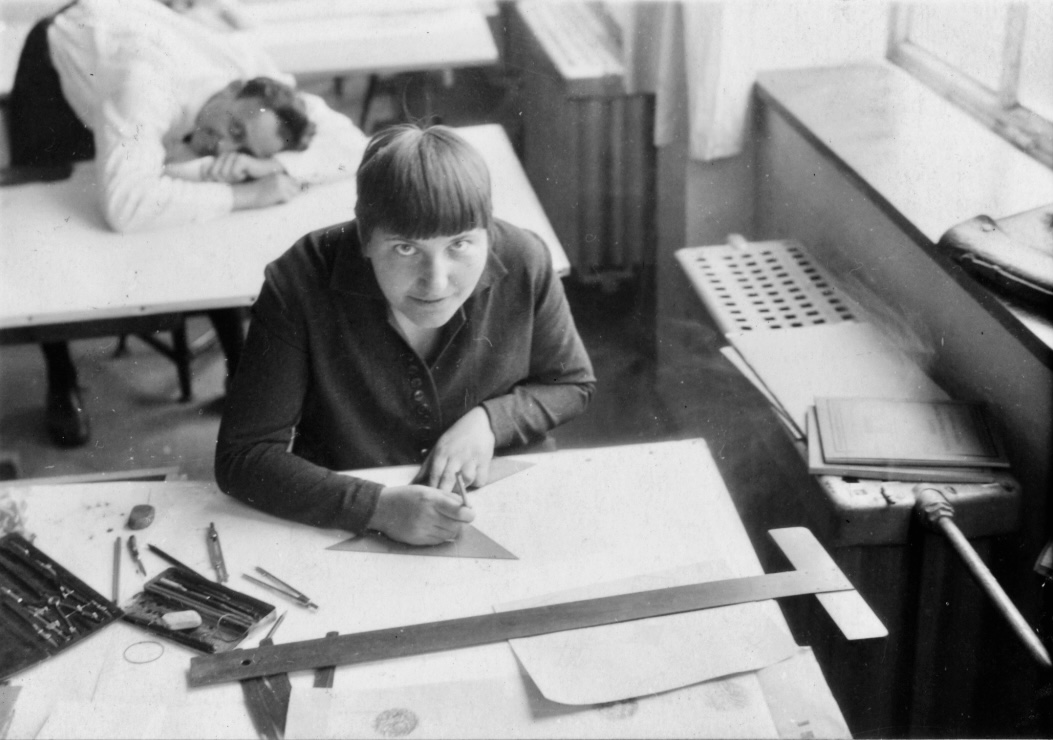
- Lotte Beese and Helmut Schulze at the Tracing Table. c. 1928.
- Born: Charlotte Ida Anna Beese; 28 January 1903; Reisicht, Germany (now Rokitki, Poland)
- Died: 18 November 1988 (aged 85); Krimpen aan den IJssel, Netherlands
- Education: Bauhaus school, Dessau
- Occupation: Architect

Charlotte Ida Anna "Lotte" Stam-Beese (28 January 1903 – 18 November 1988) was a German-Dutch architect, photographer and urban planner who helped with the reconstruction of Rotterdam after World War II.

== Biography ==
Beese was born in Reisicht, Silesia, Germany (now Rokitki, Poland). As a young adult she first found work as a weaver in Dresden.

Before beginning her career as an architect, Beese was a successful photographer. Though she only worked with the medium professionally for a short period from 1926 to 1930, her work had a disproportionate impact and is now held in the collections of the Museum of Modern Art in New York, Arthur M. Sackler Museum, the J. Paul Getty Museum the Museum of Fine Arts Houston, and Los Angeles County Museum of Art.

From 1926 to 1928 she attended the Bauhaus school in Dessau. In the next years of the interwar period she worked in office in Berlin, Moscow, Ukraine, Brno, and Amsterdam.

From 1946 to 1968, Beese worked as an urban-planning architect, and later as chief architect, for the Agency for Urban Development and Reconstruction of Rotterdam, which had been heavily bombed in 1940 during the Second World War.

== Work ==
=== Bauhaus school ===
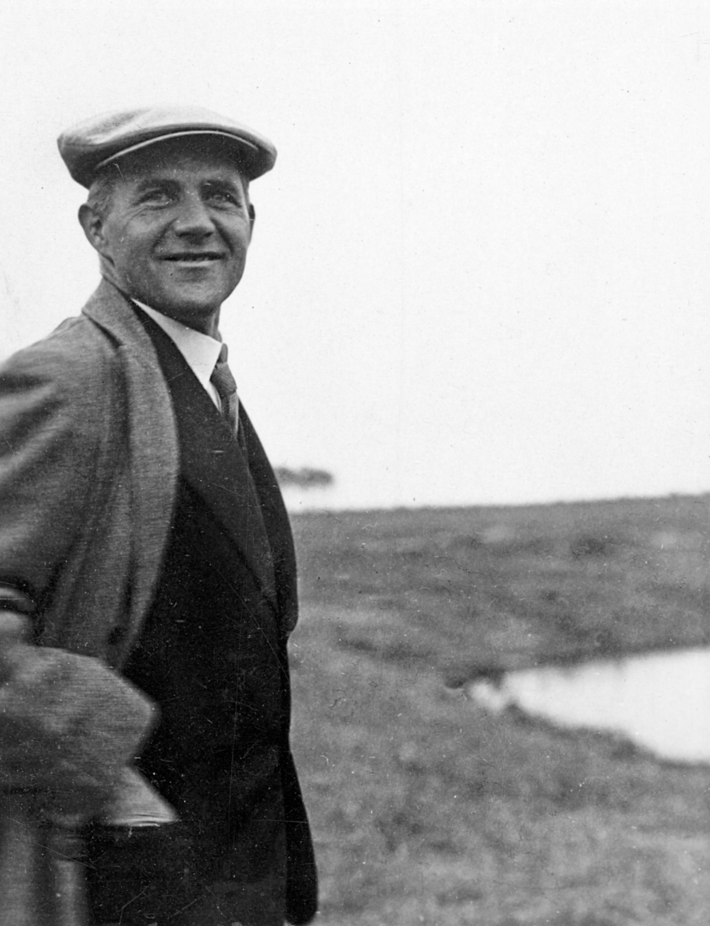
Hannes Meyer 1928.

Starting in 1926, she attended the Bauhaus school, where she studied with Josef Albers, Wassily Kandinsky, Joost Schmidt, and Gunta Stölzl. She enrolled to study the more "feminine" subject of weaving, but later, Beese got accepted into an architecture course from Hannes Meyer as the first woman to study in the building department of Bauhaus Dessau.

Compared to his predecessor, Meyer was less prejudiced about the idea of women studying subjects that were dominated by and previously reserved for men. Beese was a good student but Meyer was not convinced of Beese's future prospects, unless she would marry a male architect and work for his firm.

Meyer, Bauhaus-director and a married man with two children, and Beese started a love affair. Despite the school's liberal climate, the affair was not approved of, and in December 1928, Meyer suggested Beese to leave Bauhaus, which she did.

=== Office in Berlin, Moscow, Ukraine, Brno, and Amsterdam ===
In 1928 Hannes Meyer hired Beese at his office in Berlin, but she was dissatisfied. He then tried to find Beese another job through his network, in vain. She was turned down by Walter Traulau, because, as indicated in a letter to his friend, he did not "like working with women". Later, she followed him to Moscow, where she also met Mart Stam, whom she would later marry. Although reuniting with Meyer had not been a success, she had become pregnant.

She moved back to Brno, to continue her work at Bohuslav Fuchs' architecture firm, and gave birth in Brno to her son, Peter. Beese took Fuchs to court because he, as correspondence with a lawyer reveals, refused to pay the necessary allowance for the three months' maternity leave that he had offered. She did not return to his firm, and, given her status as a single mother and the deepening economic crisis, she struggled to find new work in Brno.

Later, Beese left to Ukraine and ran into her former Bauhaus lecturer and Dutch architect Mart Stam, with whom she started a love affair. Due to difficulties that were arising from the changing climate of the USSR, Stam and Beese decided to marry before moving to the Netherlands in 1934.

In Amsterdam, the couple set up their own firm, Stam en Beese Architecten, and in 1935, they had a daughter, Ariane. Because of her early departure at the Bauhaus, she had never received a diploma. This made it harder for her to become an architect in the Netherlands, due to the union's pressure to the Association of Dutch Architects to dismiss non-graduates from the professional world before the end of the year, in 1940.

That year, at age 37, she got admitted to start a degree in architecture at the VHBO in Amsterdam, due to her unique prior experience. The combination of her studies and the care for two children added pressure on her marriage with Stam. In 1943, they divorced, after Stam committed adultery. However, Lotte Stam-Beese decided to keep Stam's name, because the affiliation with his last name could give her a head start as an independent female architect in the Netherlands. She graduated in 1945.

=== Agency for Urban Development and Reconstruction of Rotterdam, 1946–1948 ===
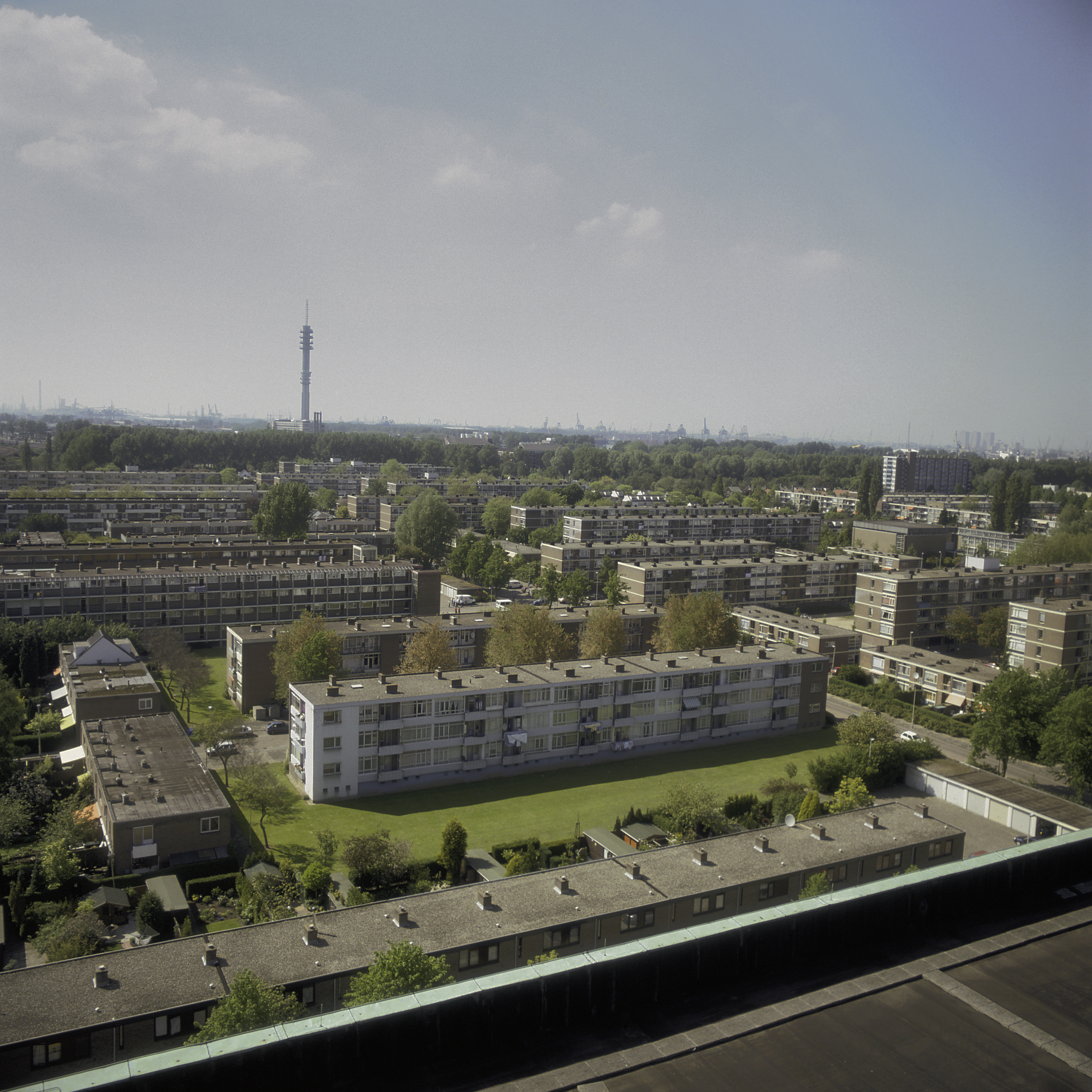
Pendrecht, Rotterdam.

At the Agency for Urban Development and Reconstruction of Rotterdam Beese was one of the few women who made such a huge contribution to the reconstruction. Designing in a Functionalist style and influenced by the planning ideologies of the CIAM association, Beese worked on several (social) housing districts around the city, including:

- Kleinpolder (1946–1952),
- Pendrecht (1948–1952),
- Westpunt in Hoogvliet (1956–1957),
- het Lage Land (1961–1962) and
- Alexanderpolder/Ommoord (1957–1971).

=== Urban planning concepts ===
She included the 'neighborhood concept' (wijkgedachte) and 'cluster' (wooneenheid) in her plan for Pendrecht, which is considered to be her most significant architectural contribution. The neighborhood concept referred to the neighborhood as a self-supporting geographical unit, a city within a city, with a social structure and community reminiscent of that of a village. During the post-war reconstruction, the neighborhood idea became a widely employed model for the creation of communities and the harmonious ordering of society.

The cluster was a form of spatial organization with a physical and social connection between each home and the neighborhood as a whole. Beese introduced a small-scale unit, the 'stamp' (stempel), to represent a microcosm of the larger community. The design of each stamp was tailored to the needs of different categories of residents such as families, single dwellers and elderly. The spatial arrangement of the freestanding blocks of different heights also reflected the social diversity. Shopping centers, schools and churches of different denominations were divided over the neighborhoods, with some traffic-free streets in between.

Buildings were separated by communal gardens and strips of greenery, with the hope that residents of these different stamps would meet and interact in the open spaces. The diversity of residents in a small-scale district would be representative of an open, democratic society, with a close-knit neighborhood quality. However, in the following decades, the idea of the neighborhood unit had been abandoned and large parts of Pendrecht were modified or torn down.
