= Chocianów =

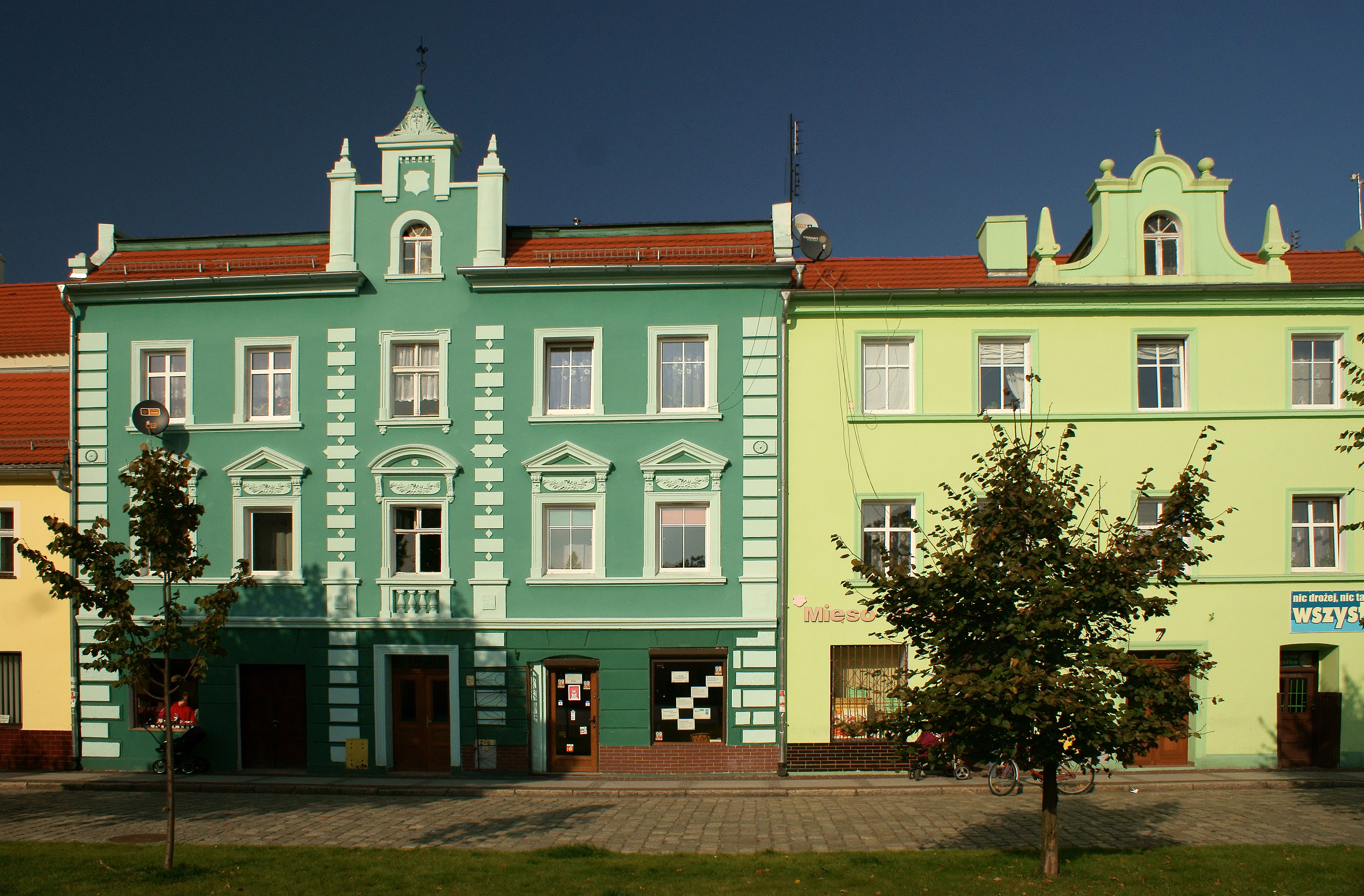
- Historic townhouses at the Market Square

- Flag Coat of arms

- Location within Poland
- Coordinates: 51°25′N 15°55′E
- Country: Poland
- Voivodeship: Lower Silesian
- County: Polkowice
- Gmina: Chocianów
- Established: 13th century
- Town rights: 1894

Government
  - Mayor: Tomasz Kulczyński

Area
  - Total: 7.31 km^{2} (2.82 sq mi)

Population (31 December 2021)
  - Total: 7,689
  - Density: 1,050/km^{2} (2,720/sq mi)
- Time zone: UTC+1 (CET)
  - Summer (DST): UTC+2 (CEST)
- Postal code: 59-140
- Area code: +48 76
- Car plates: DPL
- Climate: Dfb
- Website: http://www.chocianow.pl

Chocianów [xɔˈt͡ɕanuf] (German: Kotzenau) is a town in Polkowice County, Lower Silesian Voivodeship, in south-western Poland. As of December 2021, it has a population of 7,869.

== History ==
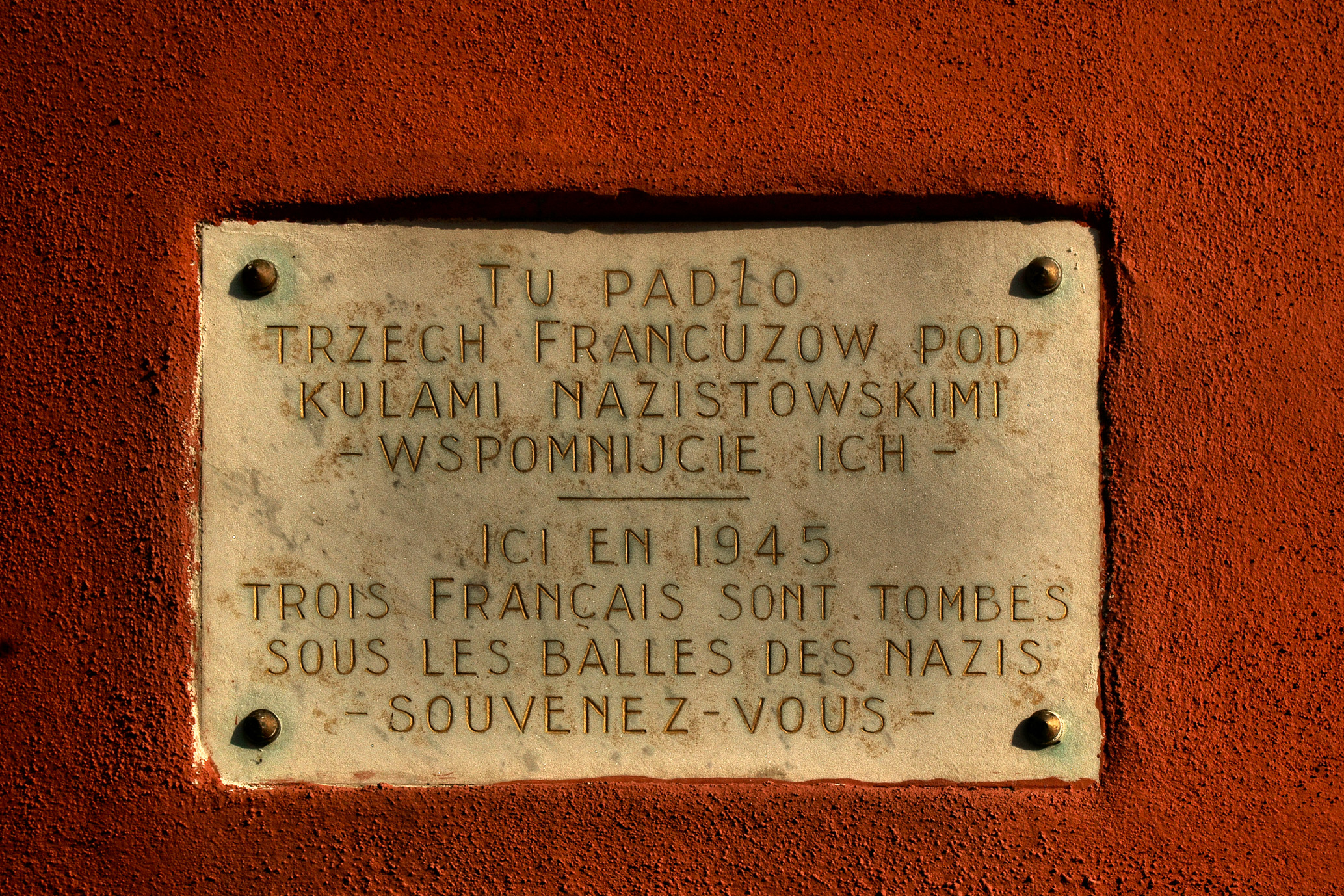
Memorial plaque to Frenchmen killed by the Nazi Germans in 1945

The area, along with Lower Silesia, was part of Poland since the establishment of the state in the 10th century. As a result of the fragmentation of Poland, by the end of the 13th century the area was part of the Polish Duchy of Świdnica, ruled by a local branch of the Piast dynasty. The settlement developed from a castle called Chodzenow built in 1297 by Duke Bolko I the Strict of Świdnica, who had to secure his lands against the claims of Wenceslaus II of Bohemia.

From 1742 Chocianów was part of Prussia and from 1871 to 1945 it was part of Germany, known by its Germanized name of Kotzenau. Town privileges were revoked in 1742 and then restored in 1894. During World War II, in 1942–1943, the German administration operated a forced labour camp for Jewish men in the town. After Nazi Germany's defeat in the war, the town became again part of Poland.

== Demographics ==
Detailed data as of 31 December 2021:

Description	All		Women		Men	
Unit	person	percentage	person	percentage	person	percentage
Population	7689	100	3954	51.4%	3735	48.6%
Population density	1051.8		540.9		511.9	

Historical population

Year	Pop.	±%
1900	3,779	—
1910	4,243	+12.3%
1925	3,813	−10.1%
1939	4,301	+12.8%
1950	1,847	−57.1%
1960	4,040	+118.7%

Year	Pop.	±%
1995	8,332	+106.2%
2000	8,354	+0.3%
2005	8,227	−1.5%
2010	8,310	+1.0%
2015	8,073	−2.9%
2020	7,773	−3.7%

== Transport ==
Voivodeship roads 328 and 331 pass through the town. The town is also served by Chocianów railway station on the Złotoryja–Rokitki railway.

== Gallery ==
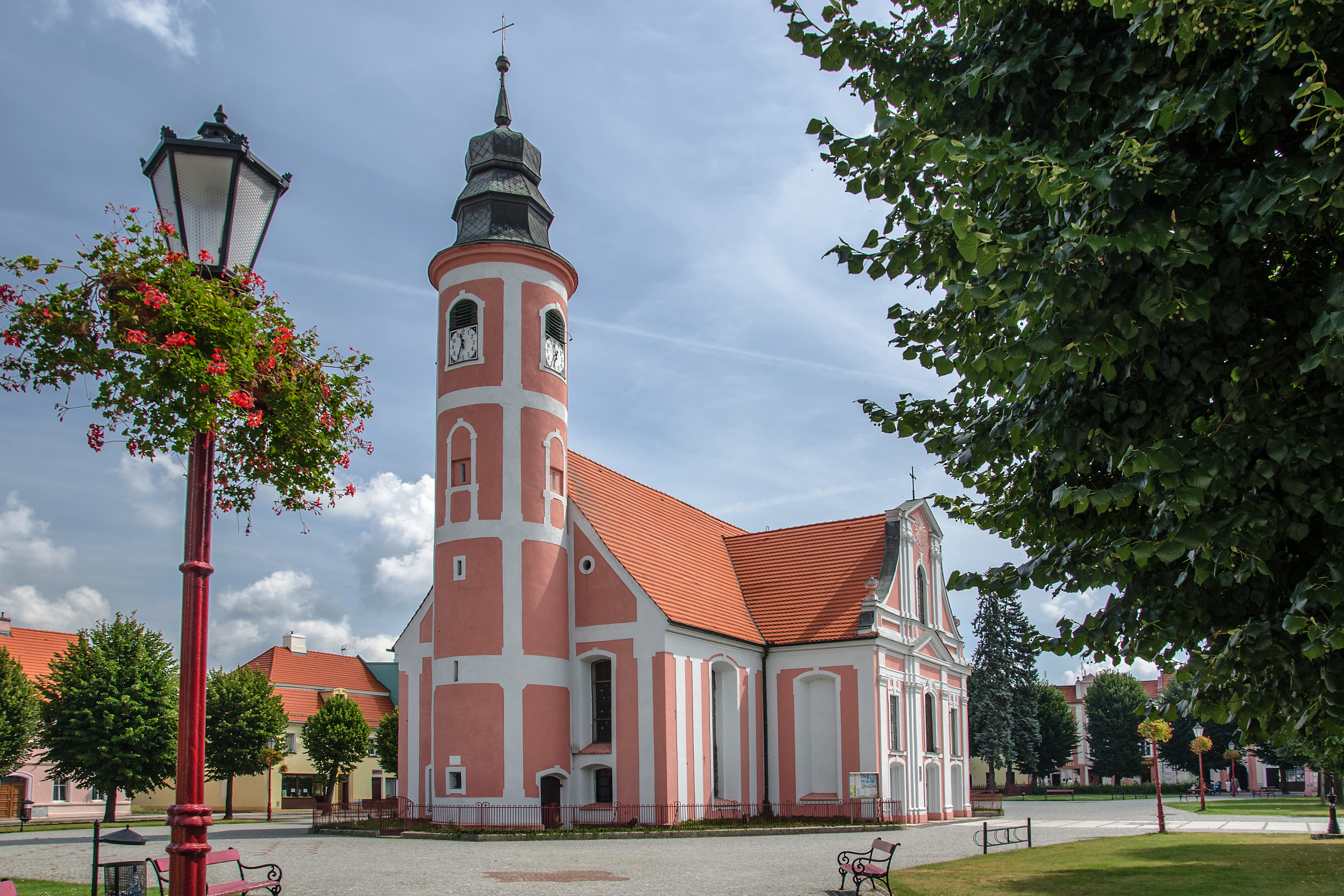
Saint Joseph church

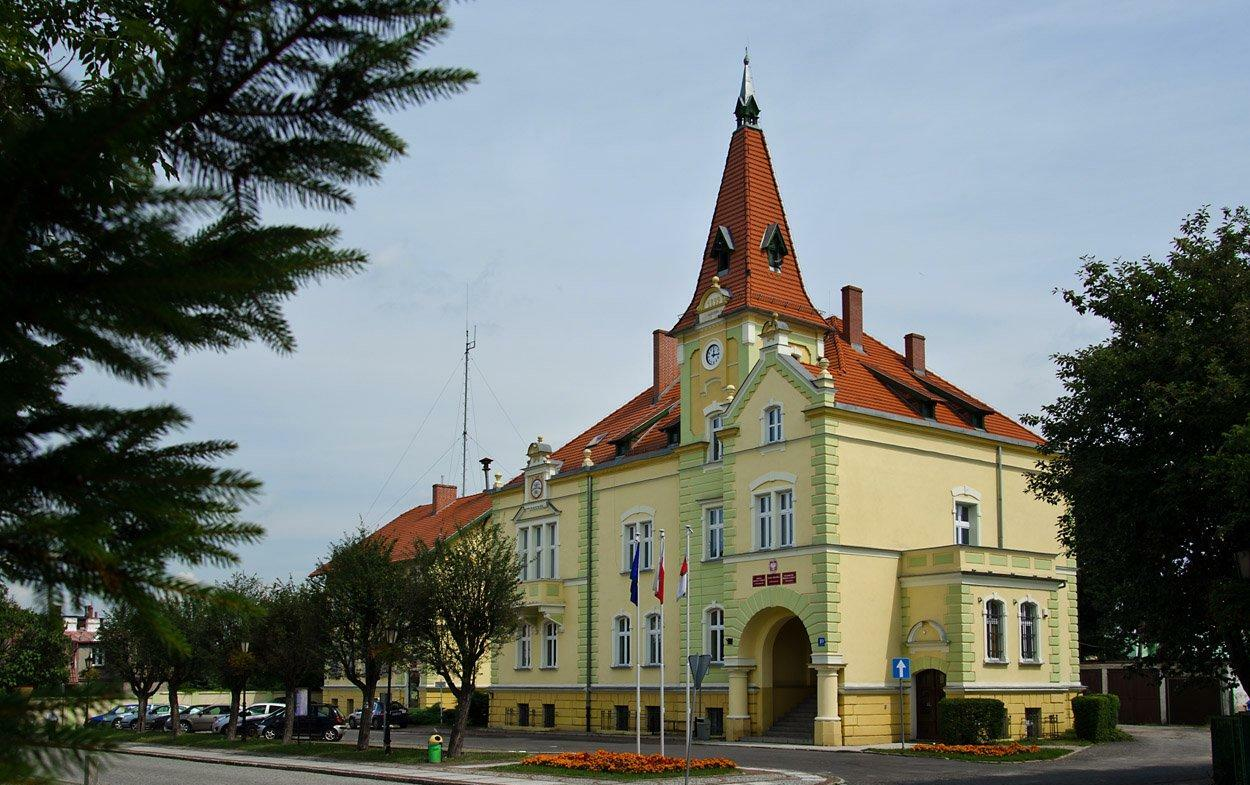
Town hall

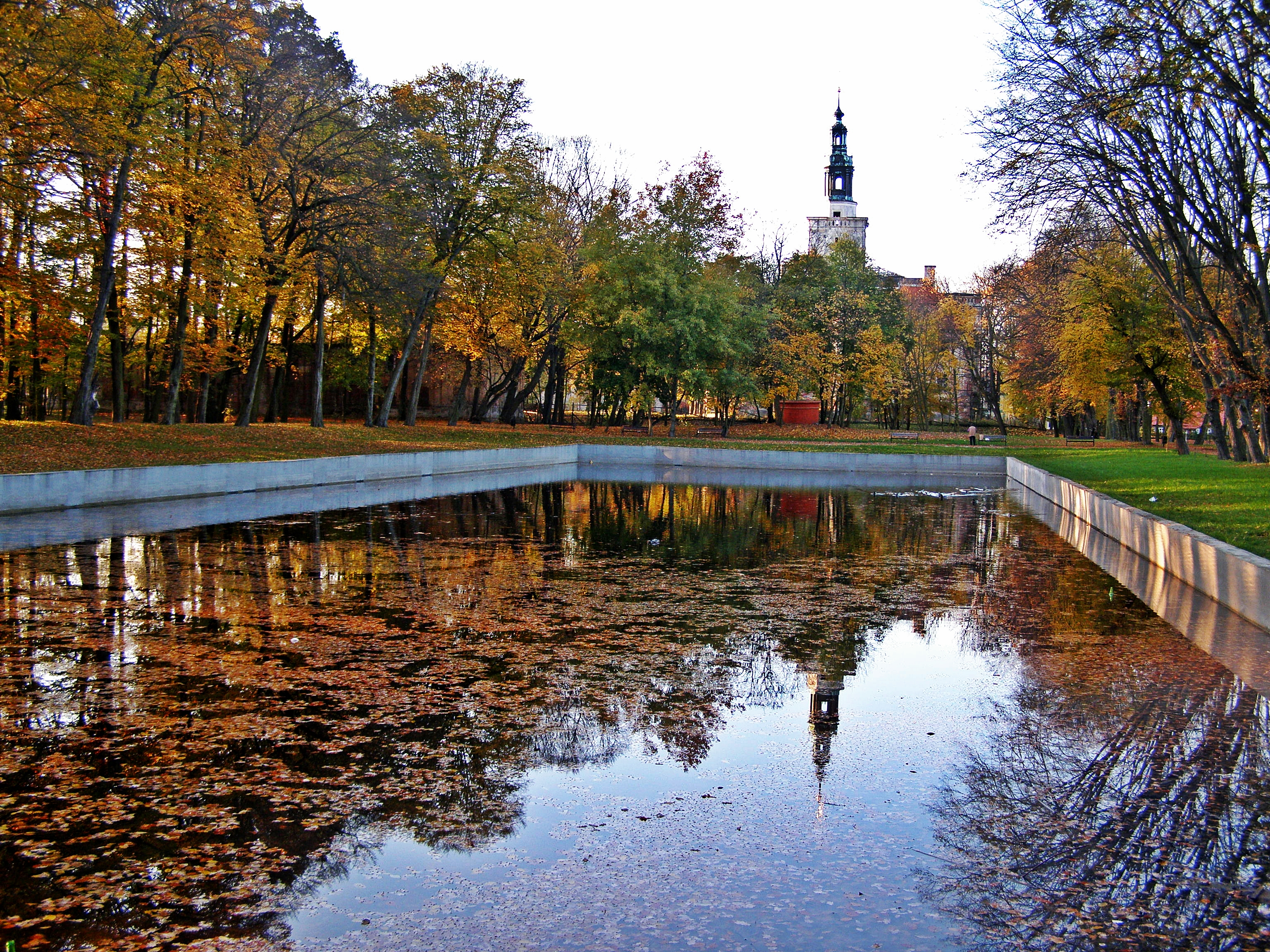
Palace Park

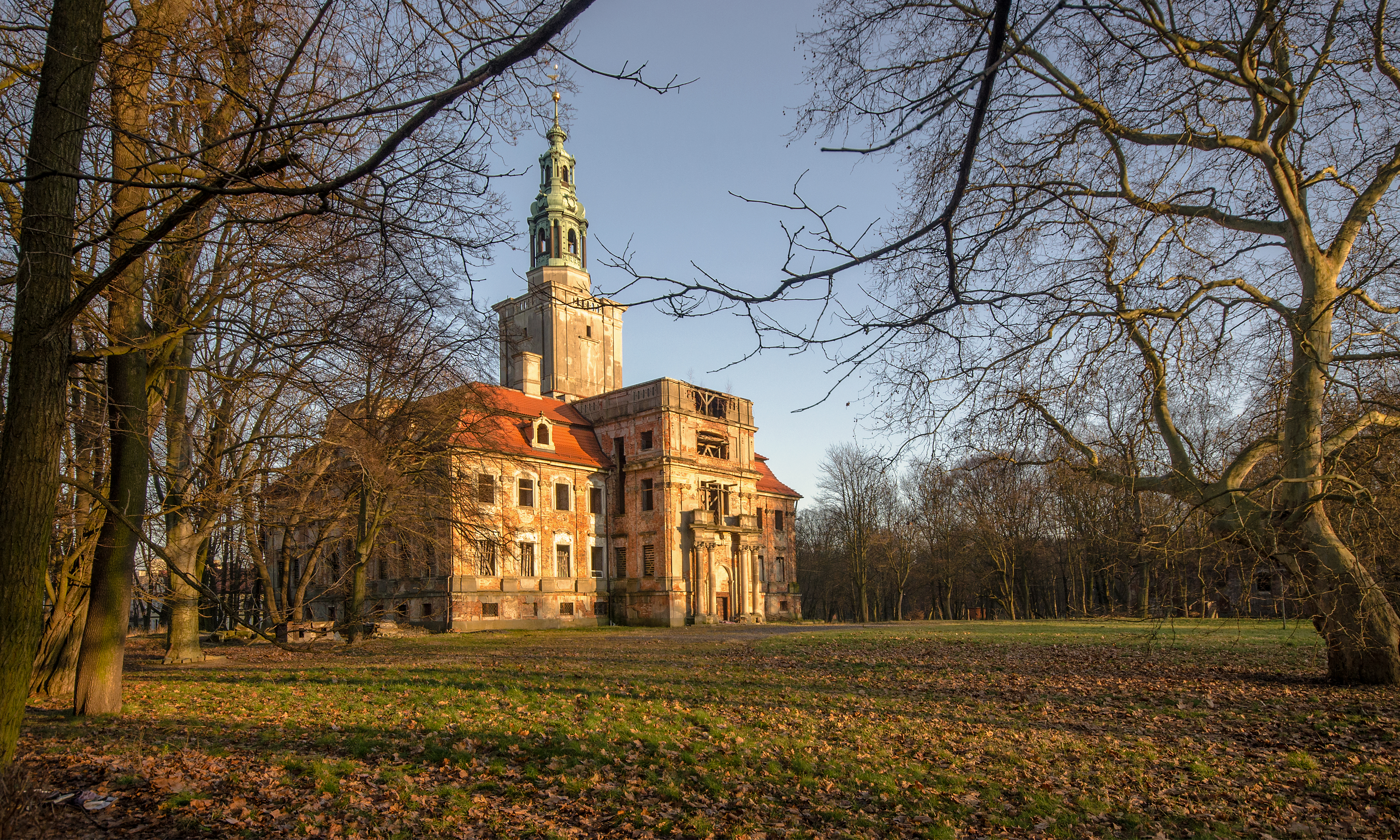
Palace ruins
