= Biała, Legnica County =

Biała
- Village
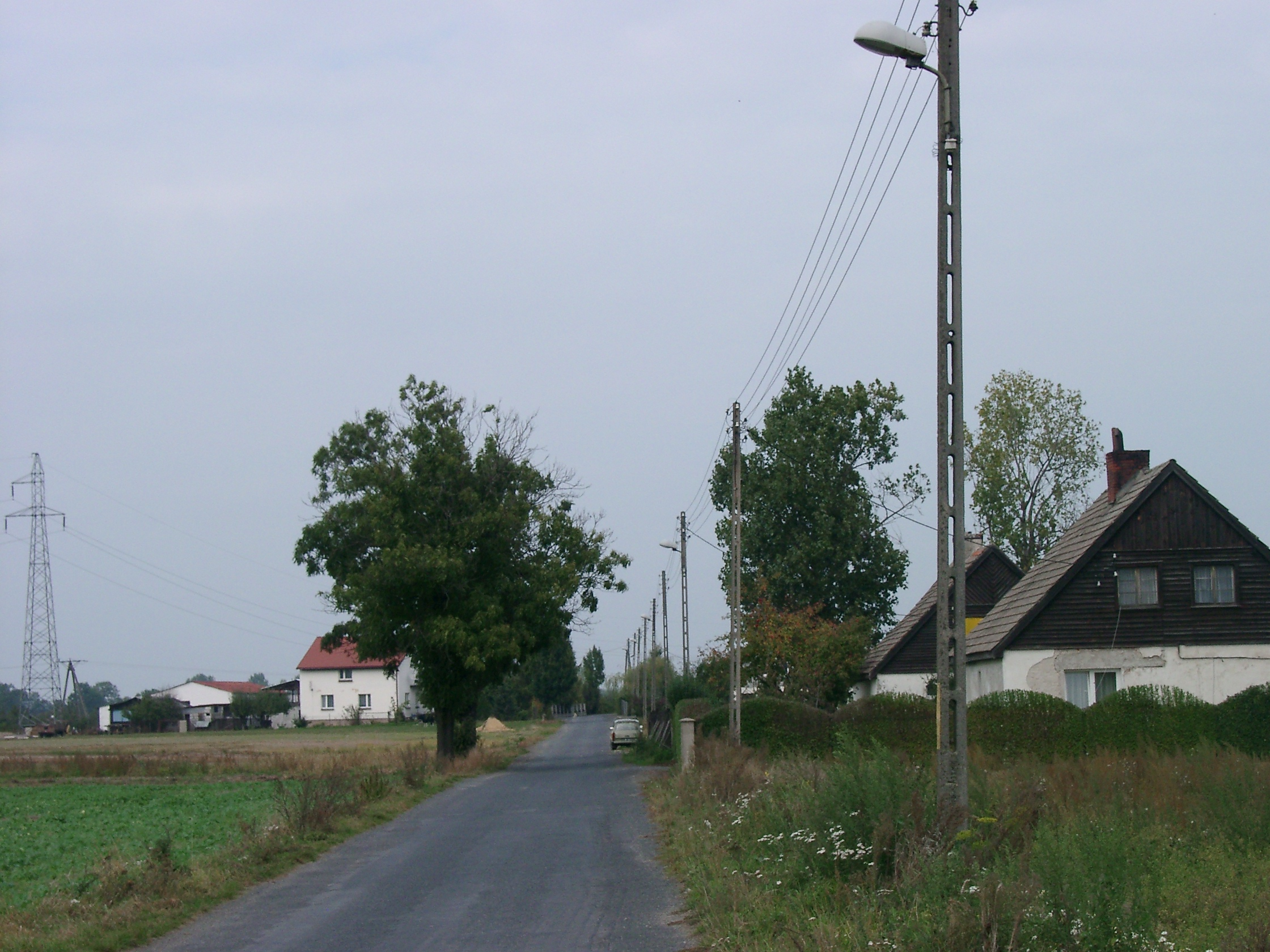

- Location within Poland
- Coordinates: 51°17′58″N 15°55′54″E
- Country: Poland
- Voivodeship: Lower Silesian
- County: Legnica
- Gmina: Chojnów
- Population (approx.): 650
- Time zone: UTC+1 (CET)
  - Summer (DST): UTC+2 (CEST)
- Vehicle registration: DLE

Biała [ˈbjawa] is a village in the administrative district of Gmina Chojnów, within Legnica County, Lower Silesian Voivodeship, in south-western Poland.

The village is served by Biała Górna railway station.
