= Złotoryja–Rokitki railway =

Railway line in Lower Silesia, Poland

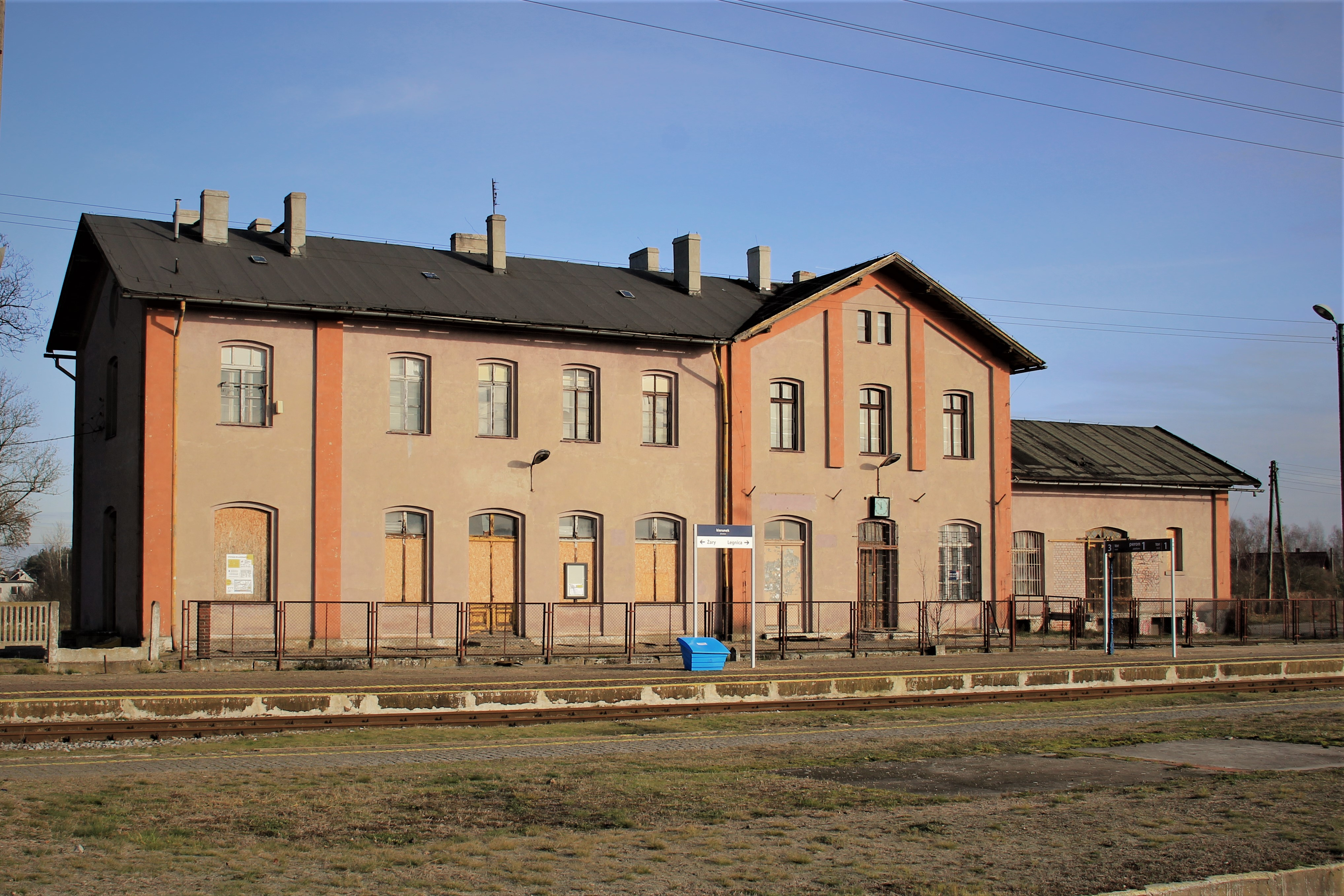
- Rokitki railway station

Overview
- Line number: PKP 316
- Locale: Lower Silesian Voivodeship, Poland
- Termini: Chojnów; Rokitki
- Stations: 3

History
- Opened: 1906

Technical
- Line length: 29.33 km (18.22 mi)
- Track gauge: 1,435 mm (4 ft 8 1/2 in) standard gauge
- Operating speed: 80 km/h (50 mph)
Route map
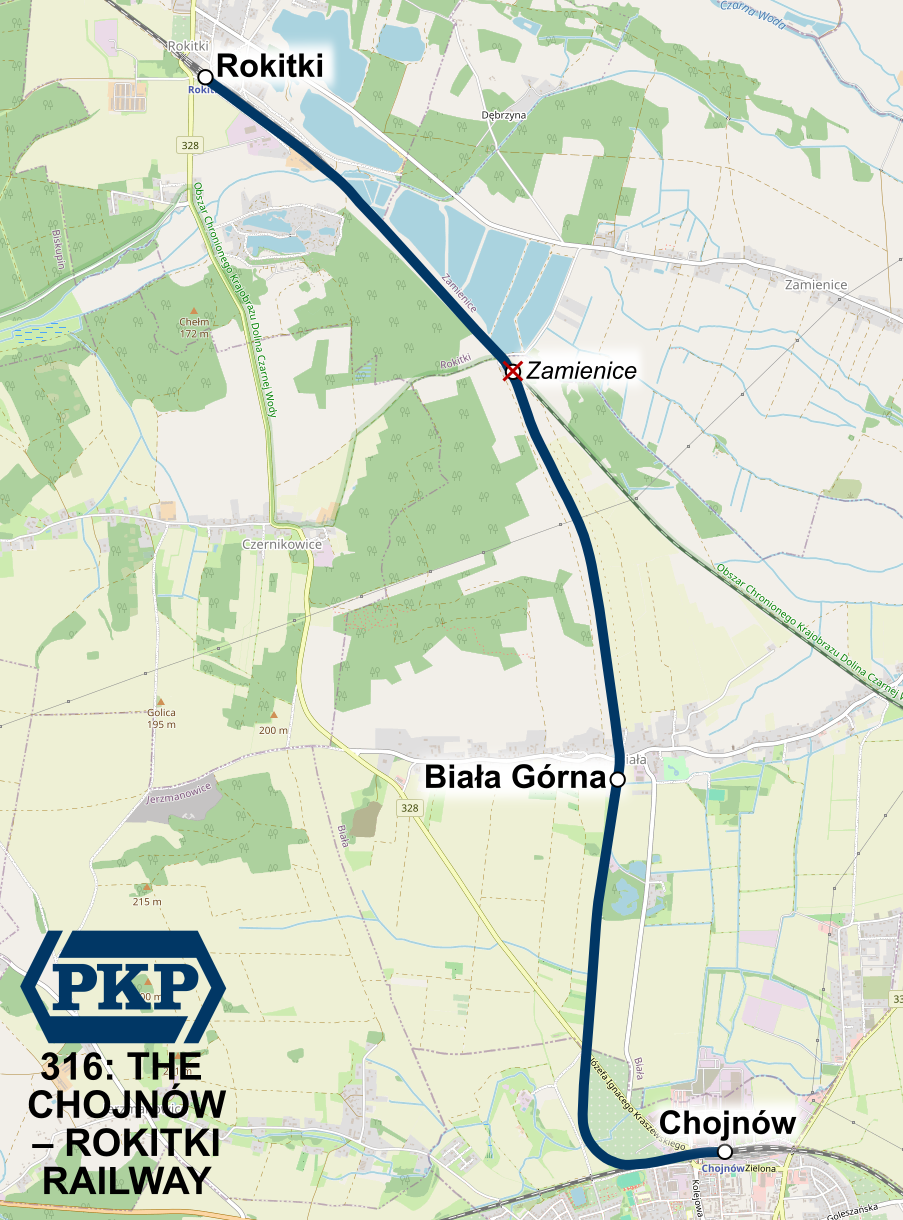

The Złotoryja–Rokitki railway is an unelectrified railway line connecting Chojnów railway station in Chojnów and Rokitki railway station in Rokitki in the Lower Silesian Voivodeship of south-western Poland.

The section between Złotoryja and Chojnów has been closed since 1991, with it being fully dismantled by 2014. The section between Chojnów and Rokitki reopened in 2022 to Chocianów, after it was closed in 2002.

== History ==
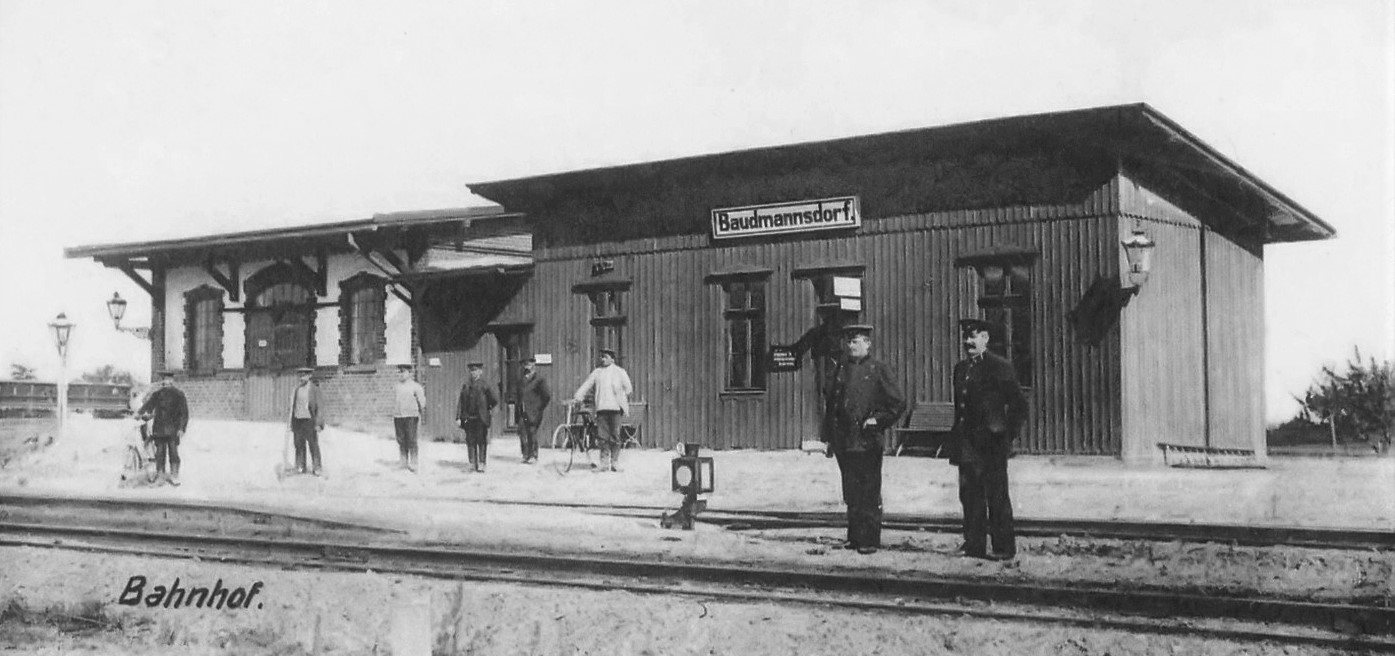
Budziwojów railway station (German: Baudmannsdorf) in the early 1900s, now closed

The first part of the line was opened by Prussian State Railways, between Złotoryja and Chojnów, on 15 September 1906. The section between Chojnów and Rokitki opened on 1 December 1906. The line connected to Legnica, Wrocław, and Berlin, part of the Berlin–Wrocław railway.

Passenger services were first withdrawn on 8 February 1991 between Złotoryja and Chojnów. This section was fully closed in 2002, as freight trains still ran occasionally. Passenger services between Chojnów and Rokitki were also withdrawn in 2002. The entire line was fully closed by 2005. The section between Złotoryja and Chojnów was fully dismantled by 2014.

=== Restoration of Chojnów–Rokitki ===
The line between Chojnów and Rokitki had been closed since 2002. Between 2007 and 2010, the Lower Silesian Voivodeship repeatedly approached Polish State Railways and the Ministry of Infrastructure for the full restoration of the section. Polish State Railways and the ministry responded that the line was unnecessary for use and that reopening it would require substantial investment and rebuilding works, at an estimated cost of around 5 million PLN.

In 2014, the demolition of this section was planned, as a follow-up after the section between Złotoryja and Chojnów were dismantled between 2012 and 2014. However, this was averted, as, the Lower Silesian Voivodeship sought to acquire this section of the line, in an aim to fully restore it and bring passenger services. This was similar to other acquisitions of railways, such as Wrocław–Trzebnica which was proven to be a success. These plans were announced to the public by the voivodeship in the same year.

On 24 January 2019, the Lower Silesian Voivodeship approved the acquisition of the section, which was later formalised on 29 April 2019. Construction works began in 2021, and, on 11 December 2022, the section reopened, at the total reconstruction cost of approximately 24 million PLN, Biała Górna was a through station. Services are operated by Lower Silesian Railways regional route D13, from Legnica to Chocianów.
