= Rokitki railway station =

Railway station in south-western Poland

Rokitki
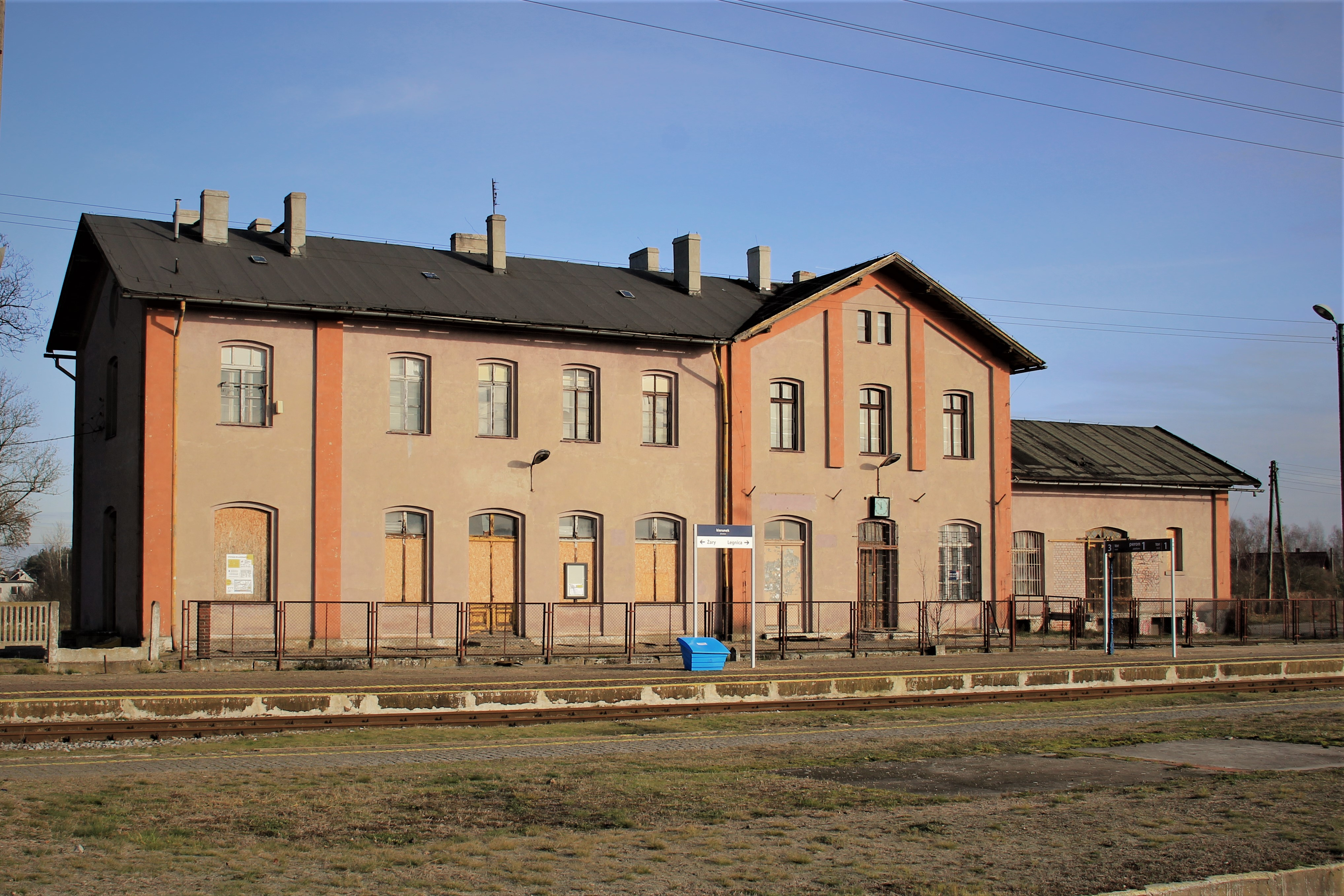
- Station building

General information
- Location: Rokitki, Lower Silesian Voivodeship; Poland
- Coordinates: 51°20′07.0″N 15°53′37.0″E
- Owner: Polish State Railways
- Lines: Wrocław–Gubinek railway; Rokitki–Kożuchów railway; Złotoryja–Rokitki railway
- Platforms: 6

History
- Opened: 15 May 1875
- Former names: Reisicht (1875–1945); Zakrzew nad Czarną Wodą (1945–1947)

Services
| Preceding station | KD | Following station |
|---|---|---|
| Biała Górna towards Legnica | D13 | Chocianów Terminus |
| Biała Górna towards Wrocław Główny | D14 | Modła towards Forst (Lausitz) |
Location
- Location within Poland Location within Lower Silesian Voivodeship

Rokitki (German: Reisicht) is a railway station in the village of Rokitki, Legnica County, within the Lower Silesian Voivodeship in south-western Poland.

== History ==
The station opened on 15 May 1875 as Reisicht. After World War II, the area east of the Oder–Neisse line came under Polish administration. As a result, the station was taken over by Polish State Railways and was renamed to Zakrzew nad Czarną Wodą, and later to its modern name, Rokitki, in 1947.

By 2002, the whole Złotoryja–Rokitki railway was closed. On 11 December 2022, the section of the line between Chojnów and Rokitki reopened.

== Train services ==
The station is served by the following services:

- Regional services (KD) Legnica - Chojnów - Chocianów
- Regional services (KD) Wrocław - Legnica - Żary - Forst

== Gallery ==
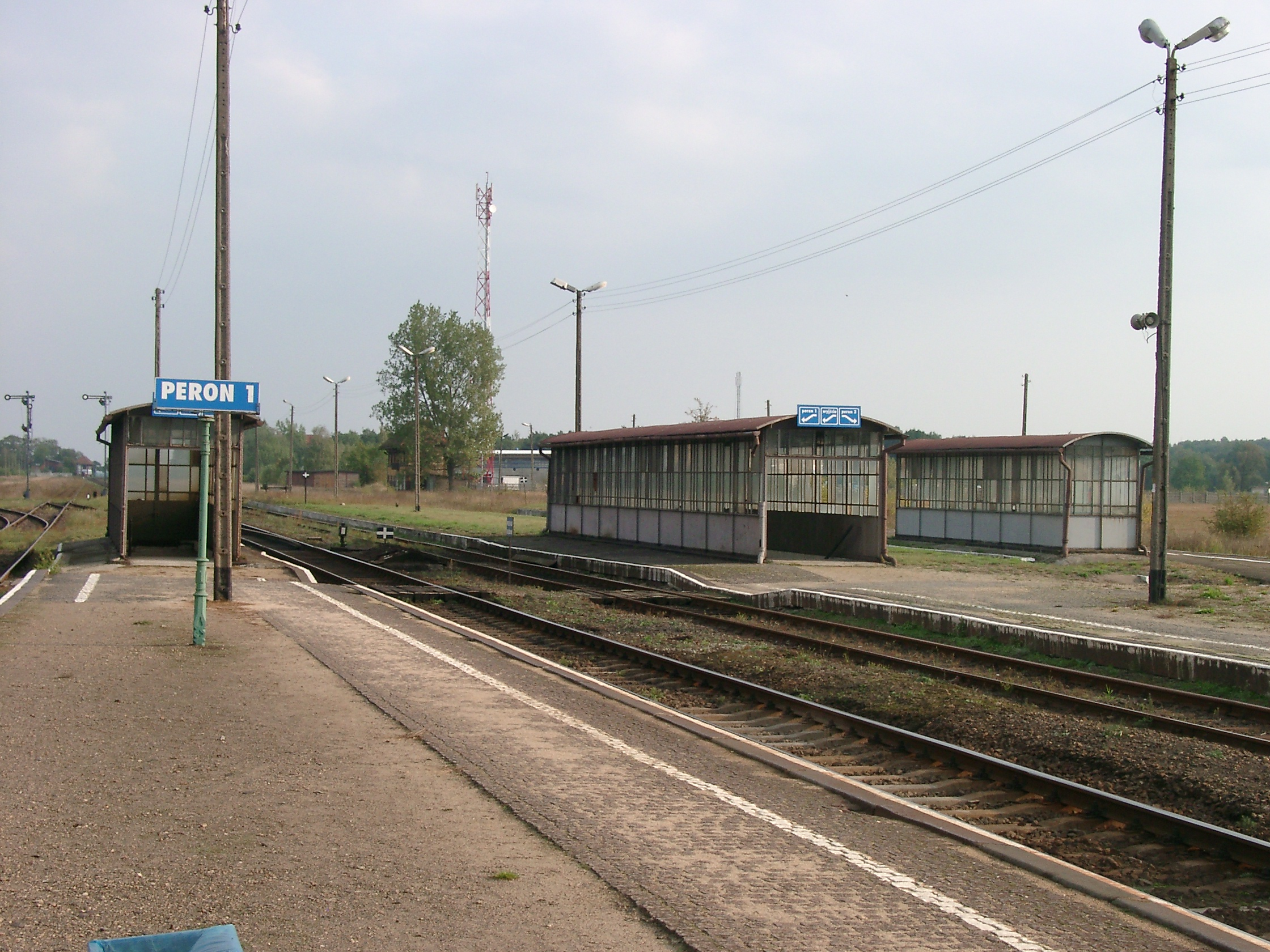
Platforms in 2005

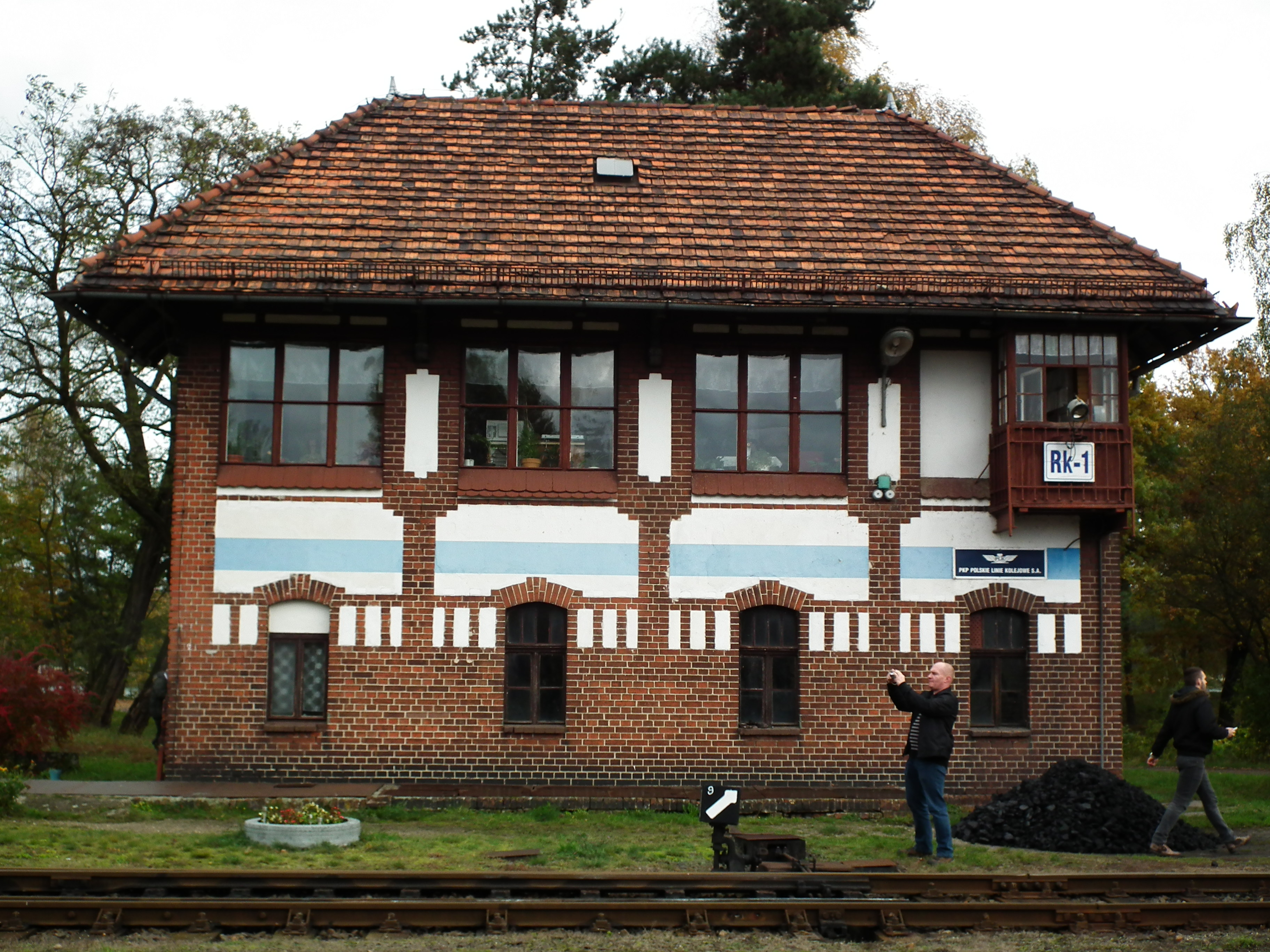
Signal box

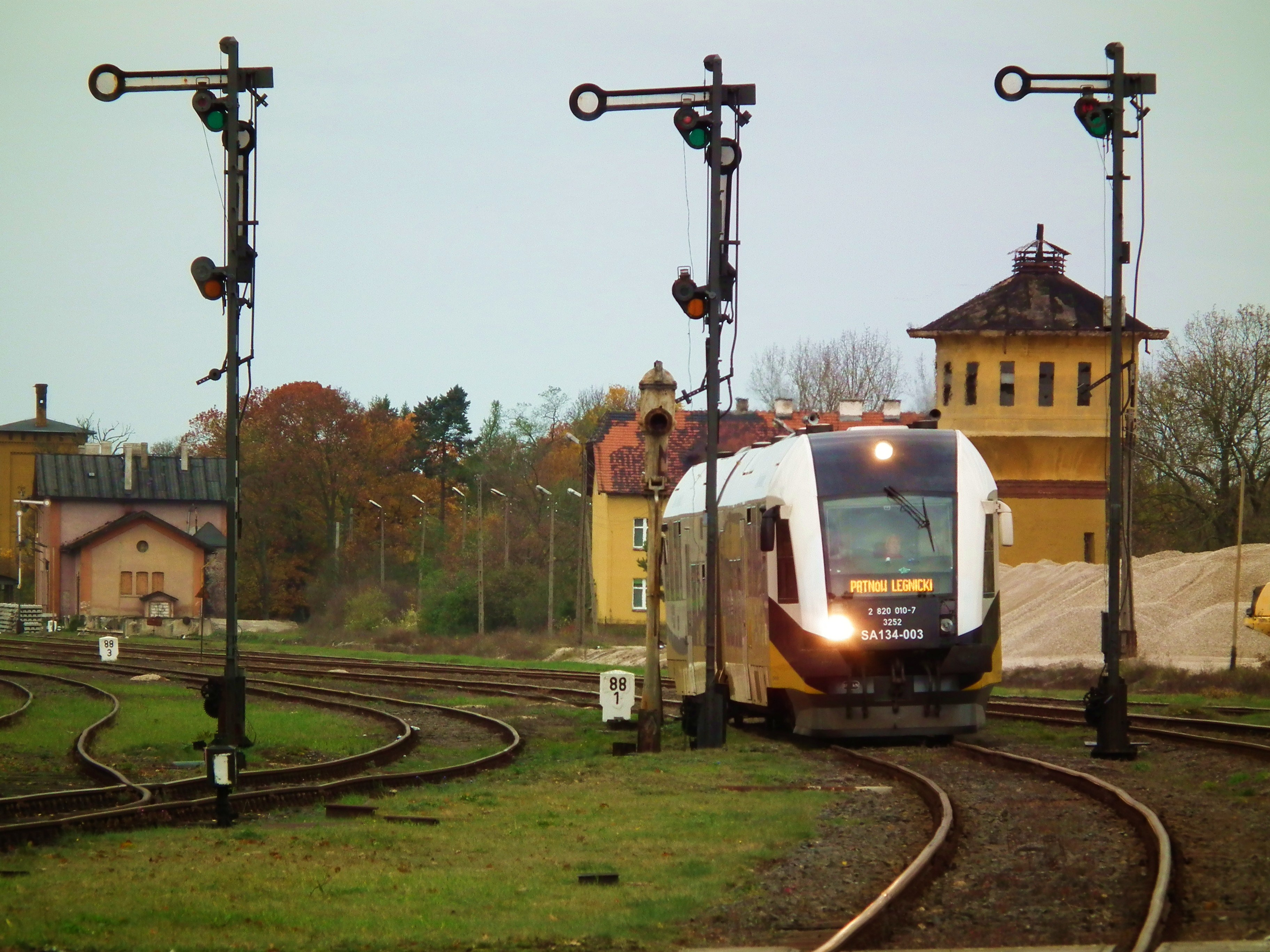
Semaphore signals

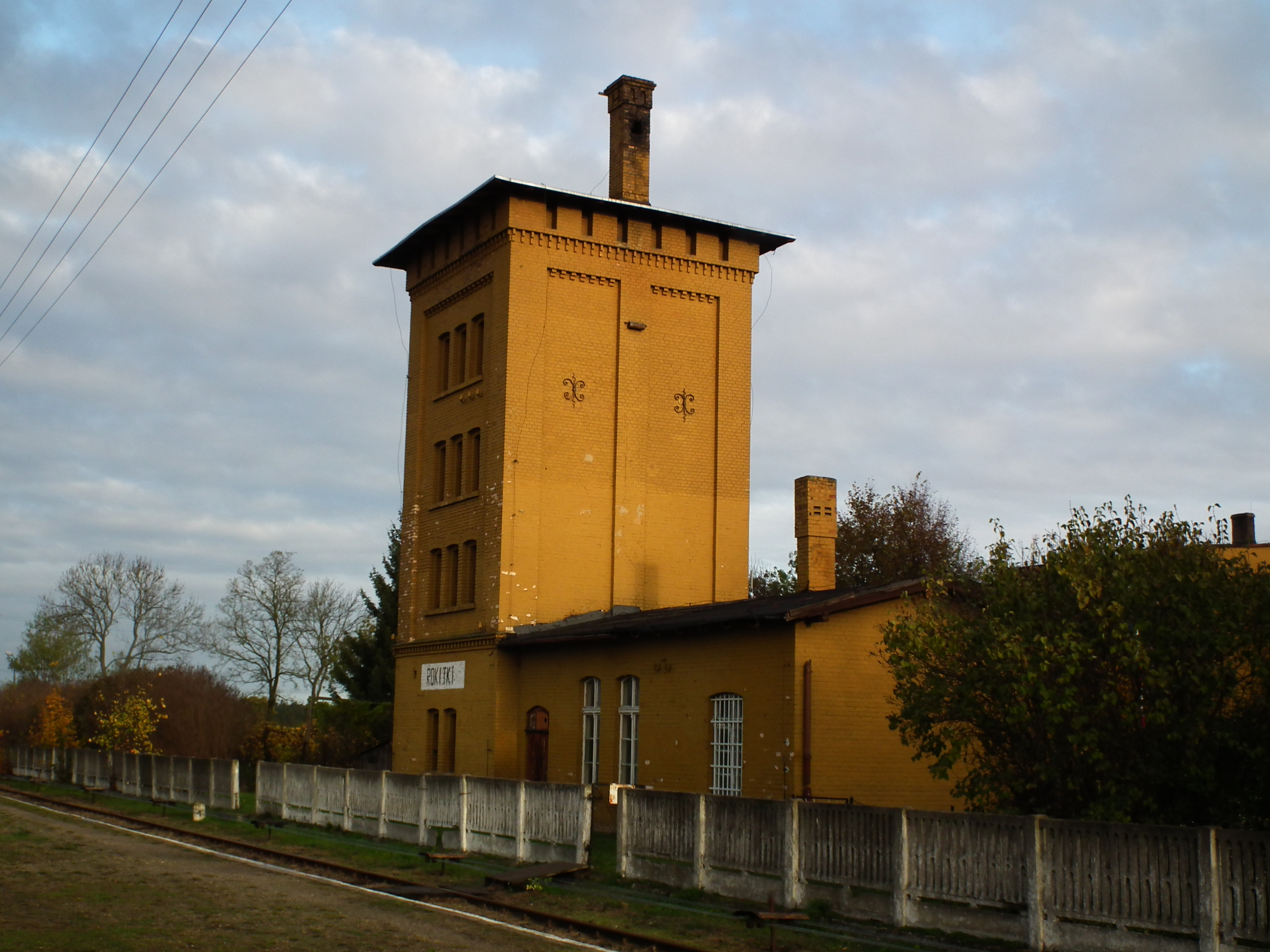
Water tower
