= Rokitki, Lower Silesian Voivodeship =

Rokitki
- Village
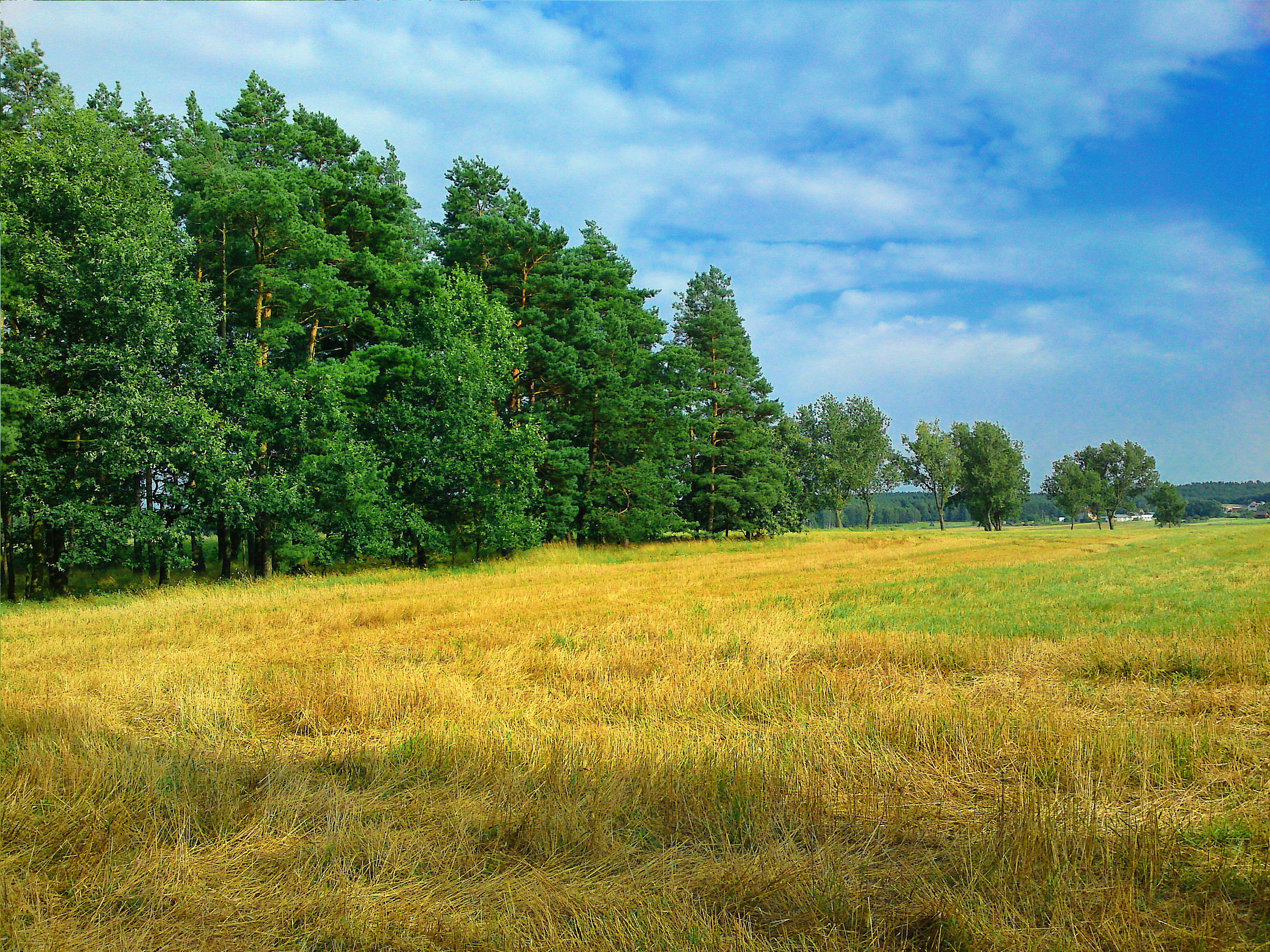

- Location within Poland
- Coordinates: 51°20′23″N 15°53′41″E
- Country: Poland
- Voivodeship: Lower Silesian
- County: Legnica
- Gmina: Chojnów

Population
  - Total: 1,010
- Time zone: UTC+1 (CET)
  - Summer (DST): UTC+2 (CEST)
- Vehicle registration: DLE

Rokitki [rɔˈkitki] (German: Reisicht) is a village in the administrative district of Gmina Chojnów, within Legnica County, Lower Silesian Voivodeship, in south-western Poland.

== Transport ==
Rokitki railway station serves the village. Voivodeship road 328 passes through the village.
