= Nowa Wieś Grodziska railway station =

Former railway station in Poland

Nowa Wieś Grodziska
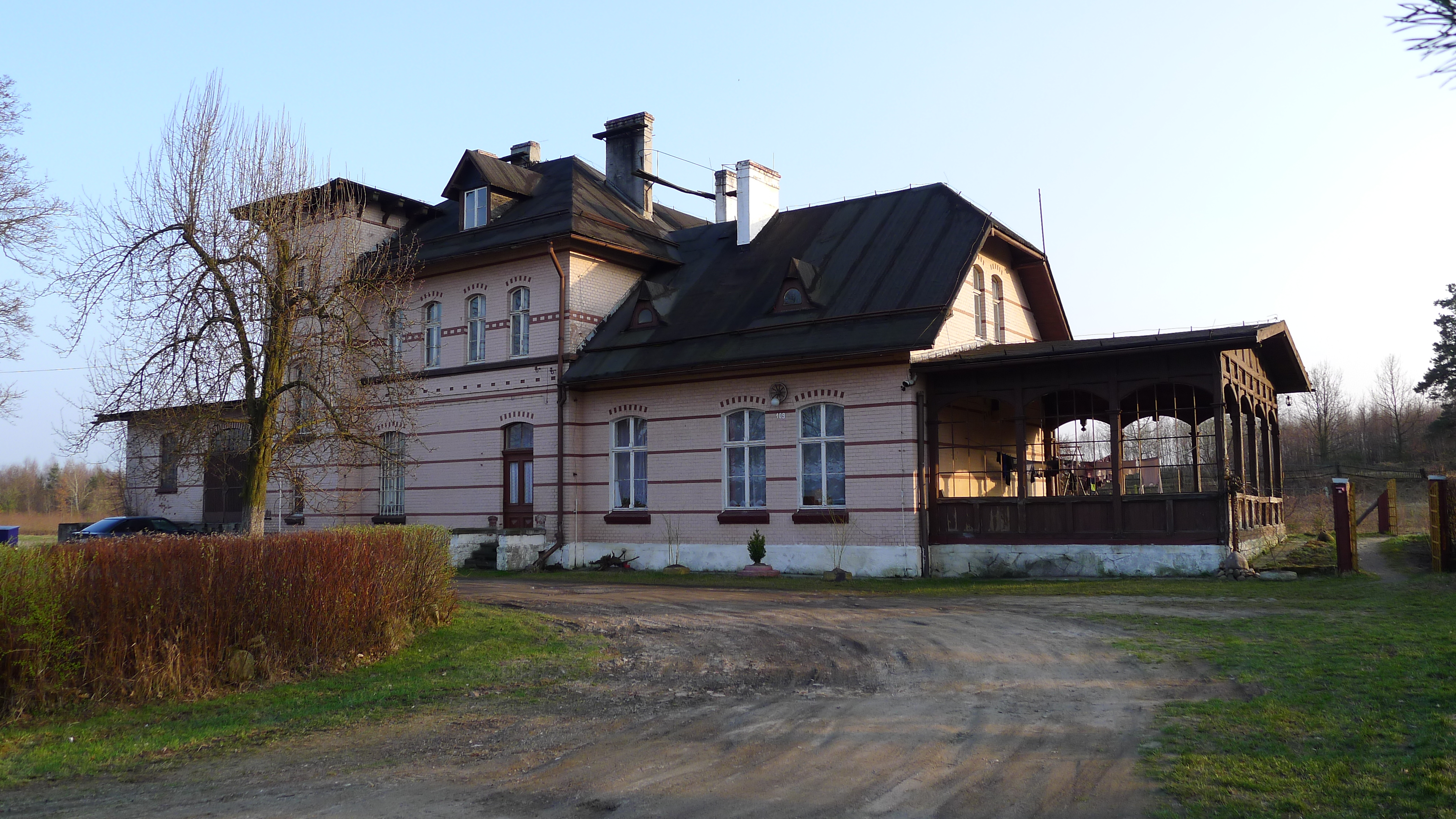
- Station building from the entrance side

General information
- Location: Nowa Wieś Grodziska; Poland
- Coordinates: 51°08′31.2″N 15°43′59.4″E
- Lines: Legnica–Jerzmanice-Zdrój railway Nowa Wieś Grodziska–Bolesławiec Wschód railway

History
- Opened: 1 December 1895
- Closed: 2000
- Former names: Neudorf am Grädützberg * (1895–1909), Neudorf (Gröditzberg) * (1910–1945), Nowa Wieś k. Grodzieńca * (1945–1946)
Location
- Location within Poland

Nowa Wieś Grodziska is a railway station closed since 2000 in Nowa Wieś Grodziska, Poland. The station was opened on 1 December 1895 along with the railway line to Lwówek Śląski. In the past, it served as a local junction station, where the former Nowa Wieś Grodziska–Bolesławiec Wschód railway originated.

== Location ==
The railway station is situated in the western part of the village of Nowa Wieś Grodziska, approximately 2.5 km from its compact settlement. Administratively, the station lies in Złotoryja County, within Pielgrzymka.

The station is located at an elevation of 279 meters above sea level.

== History ==
=== Until 1945 ===
The station's establishment was tied to the construction of the railway from Lwówek Śląski, built as compensation for the closure of a military unit in Lwówek Śląski. The section to Lwówek Śląski was commissioned on 1 December 1895. A few months later, the line was extended to Jerzmanice-Zdrój. The Nowa Wieś Grodziska–Jerzmanice-Zdrój section opened on 15 May 1896.

The station's location away from the compact settlement of Nowa Wieś Grodziska was due to its primary purpose of serving a quarry at Kopka. However, the station's placement significantly influenced the village's dynamic development from the late 19th century.

Later, the private Nowa Wieś Grodziska–Bolesławiec Wschód railway (German: Kleinbahn Bunzlau-Neudorf AG) was connected to the station. The company received a construction concession on 18 April 1905. The line to Bolesławiec Wschód was launched on 10 April 1906. Consequently, the station's track layout was expanded, turning it into a junction station. The track layout was developed in the southern part of the station. The private line to Bolesławiec was not treated equally with the state-owned Jerzmanice-Zdrój–Lwówek Śląski connection, so a small viaduct was built over the latter line near the station. There is no information on whether an additional station building was constructed. During this period, passenger services operated by the Nowa Wieś Grodziska–Bolesławiec Wschód railway were, from the mid-1930s, supplemented by light railcars (V-10 and V-11) alongside traditional steam locomotives.

=== After 1945 ===
After 1945, the railway network in Lower Silesia, including the station in Nowa Wieś Grodziska, came under the management of the Polish State Railways. This period marked a slow decline in the railway network, which intensified after 1989. However, passenger services on the Nowa Wieś Grodziska–Bolesławiec Wschód section were discontinued as early as 1976, while passenger services between Jerzmanice-Zdrój and Lwówek Śląski ceased on 1 October 1991. Around 1977, the station underwent modernization. At that time, the viaduct east of the station was abandoned due to its poor technical condition, and a track to Bolesławiec was built, bypassing the intersection with the main line. Freight traffic, and thus the complete closure of lines to Nowa Wieś Grodziska, occurred first on the Jerzmanice-Zdrój–Nowa Wieś Grodziska–Lwówek Śląski section, closed in 1992. Freight services on the former Nowa Wieś Grodziska–Bolesławiec Wschód railway continued until 28 November 2000. This latter line was removed from the PKP Polskie Linie Kolejowe register by a decision on 7 September 2005 and dismantled between 2007 and 2008.

== Infrastructure ==
=== Railways ===
Nowa Wieś Grodziska railway station was a junction station. The following railways originate from or pass through it:

- Legnica–Jerzmanice-Zdrój railway (10th movement post; 36.451 km; line impassable),
- Nowa Wieś Grodziska–Bolesławiec Wschód railway (1st movement post; 0.000 km; line dismantled).

As a junction station, it historically had extensive infrastructure, which deteriorated, particularly after the closure of the last line to Bolesławiec Wschód in 2000. The original track layout included two main tracks with platforms, four storage tracks, and five loading sidings. After the line's closure, the tracks degraded and became impassable. By 2005, only two tracks remained, with the rest dismantled.

=== Platforms ===
The station has two platforms, both in poor technical condition. Additionally, a platform for the private Nowa Wieś Grodziska–Bolesławiec Wschód railway existed in the southern part of the station, serving trains to Bolesławiec Wschód. The Nowa Wieś Grodziska–Bolesławiec Wschód railway platform and the platform for trains to Bolesławiec Wschód were distinct and located on opposite sides of the station.

=== Station building and warehouse ===
The station features a railway station building housing the signal box Nwg. The building is brick, two-story, with a roof covered in tar paper. It formerly contained a winter waiting room (before World War II, it housed a restaurant), a terrace converted from the restaurant into a summer waiting room, and a ticket office. Currently, the building serves residential purposes. Adjacent to the station building is a goods warehouse. Loading ramps are present near the building and a side-front ramp at the station's end.

=== Water tower ===
West of the station building stands a water tower. It has a brick octagonal base and a wooden tank enclosure. It is in good condition and used as a hay storage.

=== Locomotive shed ===
A small locomotive shed of the former Nowa Wieś Grodziska–Bolesławiec Wschód railway was located in the southeastern part of the station. It was a single-bay structure, demolished in 1992. Polish State Railways used it as a forge.

=== Other infrastructure ===
In addition to the described elements, the station featured or still features:

- an utility building (used as a storage shed),
- an utility building adapted as a railway workers' residence,
- a loading area with a wagon scale (dismantled) and a loading gauge,
- a toilet facility,
- two water cranes for steam locomotive refilling.

== Connections ==
Period	Destination	Number of connections	Source
1946/47	Bolesławiec; Płakowice	2; 2	
1970/71	Bolesławiec Wschód; Legnica; Lwówek Śląski; Złotoryja; Chojnów; Jelenia Góra; Świeradów Zdrój	3; 3; 2; 2; 1; 1; 1	
1990/92	Jelenia Góra; Legnica	4; 4	
