= Greiffenberg =

Greiffenberg may refer to:

- Gryfów Śląski, Poland
- Greiffenberg, Brandenburg, Germany
