= Gryfów Śląski railway station =

Railway station in Gryfów Śląski, south-western Poland

Gryfów Śląski Silesian Gryfów
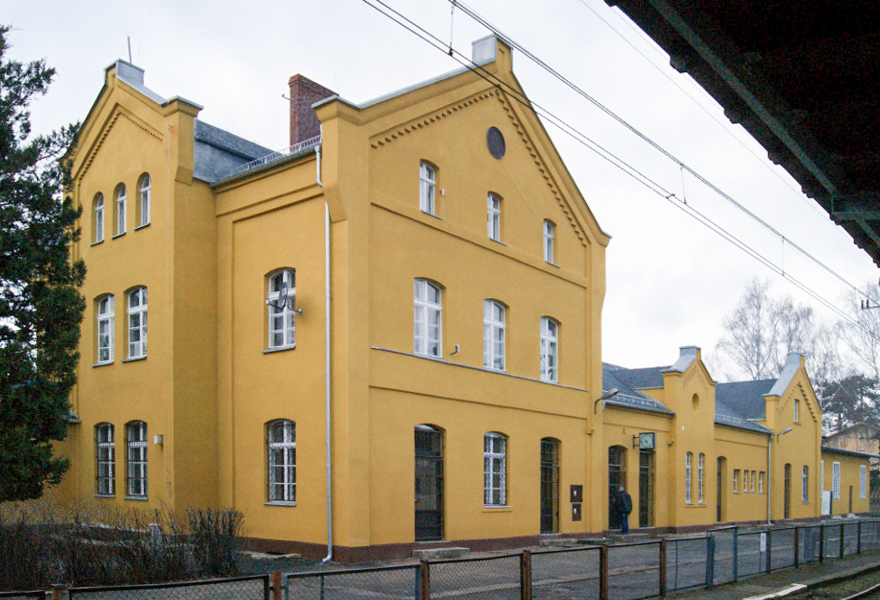
- Station building in January 2015

General information
- Location: Gryfów Śląski, Lower Silesian Voivodeship; Poland
- Coordinates: 51°02′02.0″N 15°25′44.0″E
- Owner: PKP Polskie Linie Kolejowe
- Lines: Wrocław Świebodzki–Zgorzelec; Legnica–Jerzmanice-Zdrój; Gryfów Śląski–Świeradów-Zdrój
- Platforms: 4

History
- Opened: 20 September 1865
- Former names: Greiffenberg (1865–1914); Greiffenberg (Schlesien) (1914–1945); Gryfin Śląski (1945–1947)

Services
| Preceding station | KD | Following station |
|---|---|---|
| Młyńsko towards Świeradów-Zdrój or Karpacz | D62 | Ubocze towards Görlitz |
Location
- Location within Poland Location within Lower Silesian Voivodeship

Gryfów Śląski (lit. 'Silesian Gryfów') is a railway station in the town of Gryfów Śląski, Lwówek County within the Lower Silesian Voivodeship in south-western Poland.

== History ==
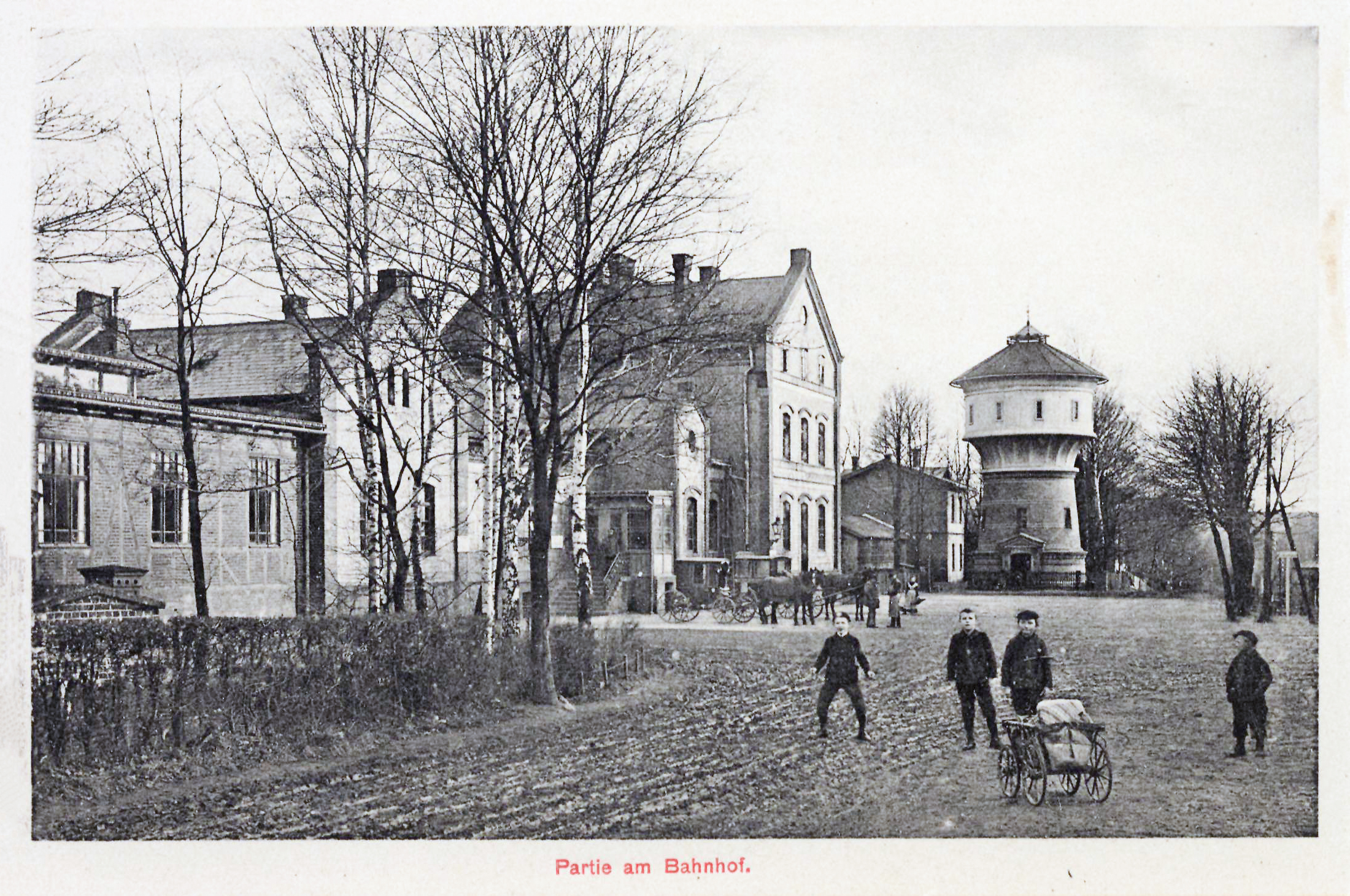
Station building c. 1900

In 1862, a decision was made to extend the Silesian Mountain Railway from Rybnica to Zgorzelec; Gryfów Śląski was one of the through stations in the extension. The extension was intended to form part of the Berlin–Vienna railway and to help boost the struggling textile and mining industries in the Wałbrzych, Jelenia Góra, and Kamienna Góra regions. The extension, initially a single-track line opened together with the station on 20 September 1865, initially named Greiffenberg.

In 1882 the Landtag of Prussia planned Gryfów Śląski to be connected with Mirsk, in order to stimulate the local economy. Following its opening on 1 November 1884, the station became a railway junction. The Legnica–Jerzmanice-Zdrój railway between Lwówek Śląski and Gryfów Śląski was built as compensation for the closure of a military unit in Lwówek Śląski. The first section of this line, connecting Lwówek Śląski and Gryfów Śląski, opened on 15 October 1885. The line was double-tracked in around 1900. It was electrified between Jelenia Góra and Lubań Śląski in 1921.

After World War II, the area came under Polish administration. As a result, the station was taken over by Polish State Railways (PKP). It was renamed to Gryfin Śląski in 1945, and later to its modern name, Gryfów Śląski, in 1947. It was at this point when the station's importance in the region began its decline, the Jelenia Góra–Lubań Śląski section lost its electrification in 1945, after it was dismantled by the Red Army. Passenger services to Lwówek Śląski were withdrawn in 1983. The Jelenia Góra–Lubań Śląski section was re-electrified on 13 December 1986.

From 2009 onwards, local authorities sought to have the station building renovated. PKP started renovation work in September 2014, with repairs to the canopy on platform 2, followed by the refurbishment of the station building in November 2014. In June 2022, renovation of the platforms commenced; the project involved sandblasting the metal structure of the platform canopy, replacing its roofing and the concrete platform surface slabs, and installing new signage and lighting.

On 8 June 2020, the at the time closed Gryfów Śląski–Świeradów-Zdrój railway was taken over by the Lower Silesian Voivodeship. Initial revitalisation work began in May 2021, with the line reopening to regular passenger services on 10 December 2023.

== Station ==
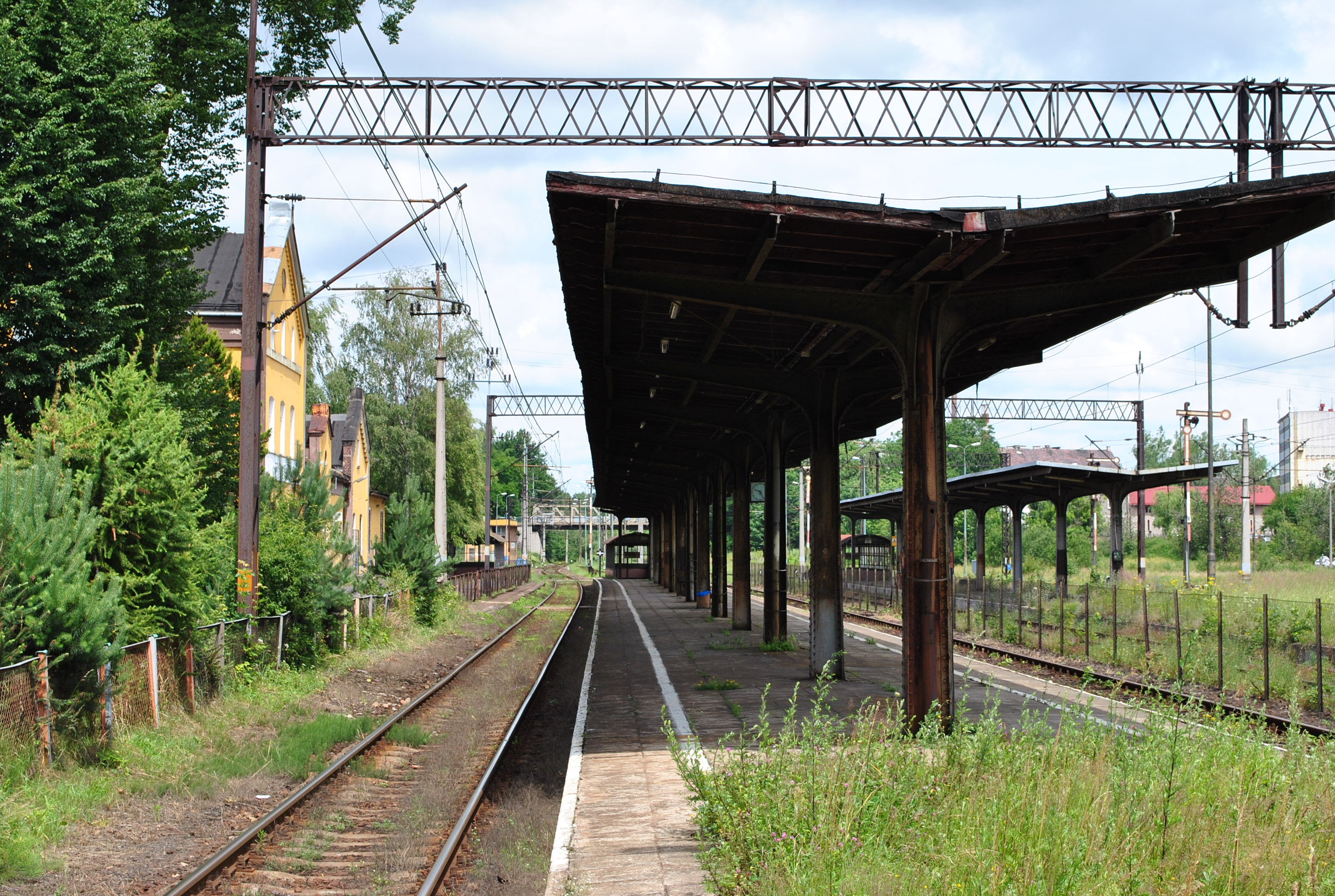
Platforms prior to their reconstruction

Gryfów Śląski is a railway junction station with two island platforms, forming 4 platforms all together. It is situated on the Wrocław Świebodzki–Zgorzelec, Legnica–Jerzmanice-Zdrój, and Gryfów Śląski–Świeradów-Zdrój railways. Five tracks run through the station, and an additional 11 serve as sidings, typically for stabling and shunting freight trains. A depot, water tower, goods yard, wharehouse, are also at the station.

== Train services ==
The station is served by the following services:

- Regional services (KD) Karpacz / Świeradów-Zdrój - Gryfów Śląski - Görlitz
