= Legnica–Jerzmanice-Zdrój railway =

Railway in Poland

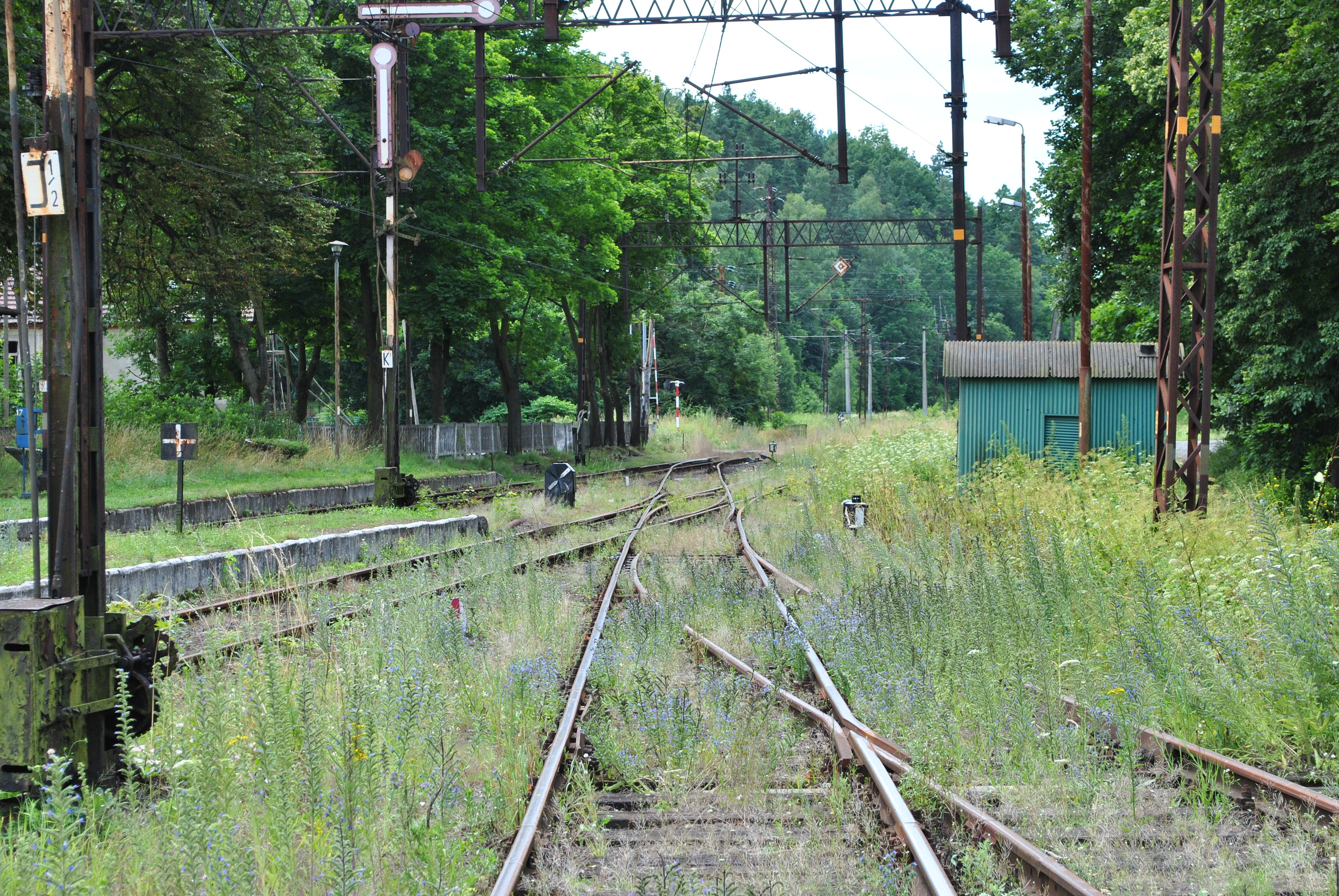
- Railway beyond the Jerzmanice-Zdrój station

Overview
- Line number: 284
- Locale: Lower Silesian Voivodeship, Poland
- Termini: Legnica; Pobiedna

Service
- Operator(s): PKP Polskie Linie Kolejowe; Lower Silesian Road and Railway Service in Wrocław

History
- Opened: 1904
- Closed: 1945 (Pobiedna – border); 1987 (Mirsk – Pobiedna); 1992 (Jerzmanice-Zdrój – Gryfów Śląski)

Technical
- Line length: 87.840 km (54.581 mi)
- Track gauge: 1,435 mm (4 ft 8 1/2 in) standard gauge
- Electrification: 3,000 V DC (Legnica – Jerzmanice-Zdrój section)
- Operating speed: 50 km/h (31 mph)
Route map
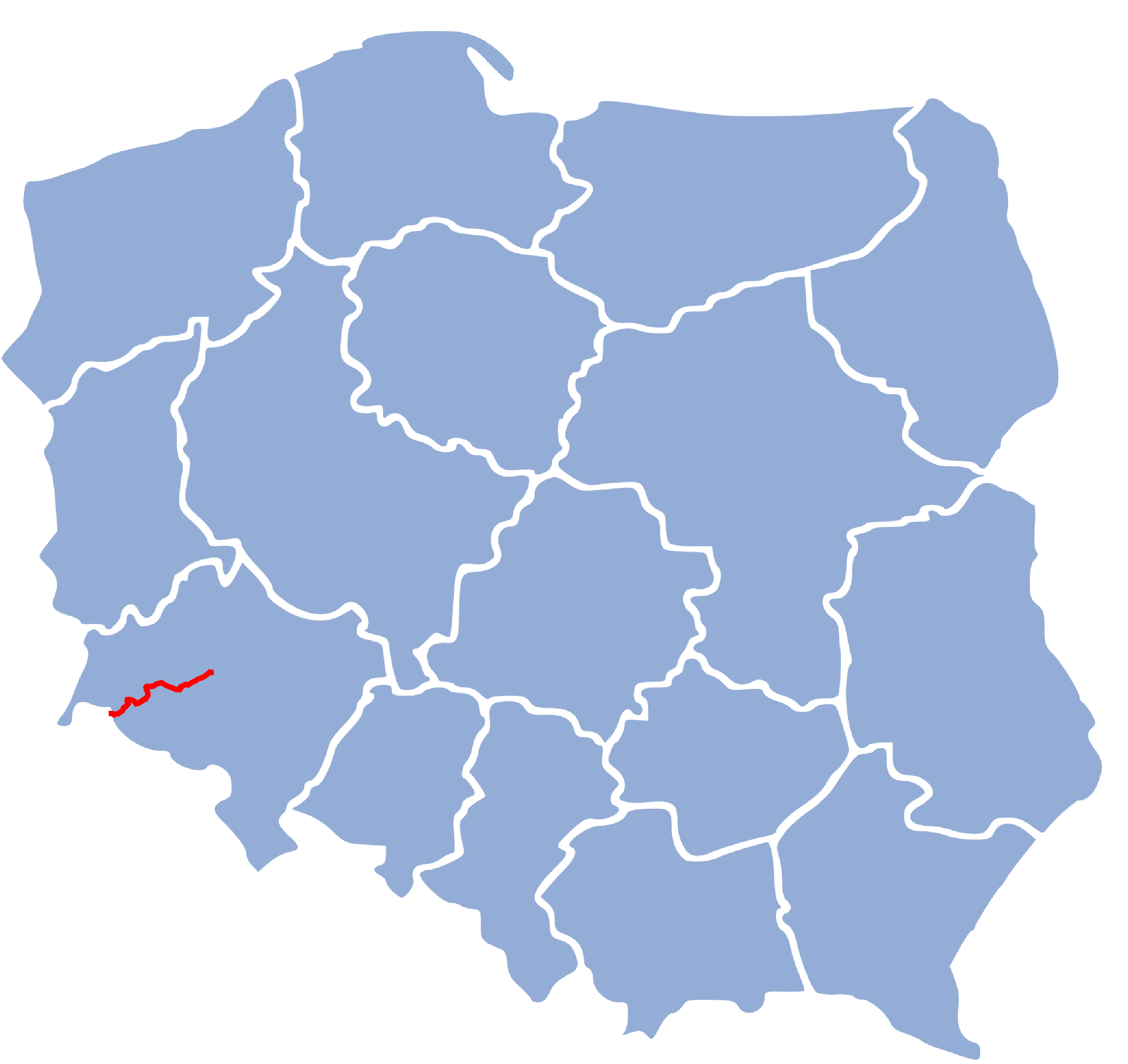

The Legnica–Jerzmanice-Zdrój railway is a single-track, main-line, almost entirely electrified railway in southwestern Poland, located in the Lower Silesian Voivodeship, connecting Legnica with Jerzmanice-Zdrój. Originally, it connected Legnica with the Polish-Czech border beyond the Pobiedna railway station via Jerzmanice-Zdrój, Lwówek Śląski, Gryfów Śląski, and Mirsk.

The following railways and sections run along the original route of Legnica–Jerzmanice-Zdrój railway:

- Legnica–Jerzmanice-Zdrój railway, with a length of 24.787 km; a section managed by PKP Polskie Linie Kolejowe, on which freight traffic operated;
- Section from Jerzmanice-Zdrój (24.384 km) to Gryfów Śląski (71.481 km), with a length of 47.205 km, partially decommissioned;
- Gryfów Śląski–Świeradów-Zdrój railway, with a length of 8.763 km; section managed by the Lower Silesian Road and Railway Service in Wrocław; open to passenger traffic since 10 December 2023;
- Section from Mirsk (80.244 km) to the state border (87.840 km), with a length of 7.596 km; section decommissioned.

The railway in its original route runs through the counties of Legnica, Złotoryja, Lwówek, and Lubań, as well as the city of Legnica, which has county-level status. It lies within the operational area of PKP Polskie Linie Kolejowe's Railways Division in Wrocław (up to km 7.800, beyond the Pawłowice Małe railway station) and in Wałbrzych.

== Route ==
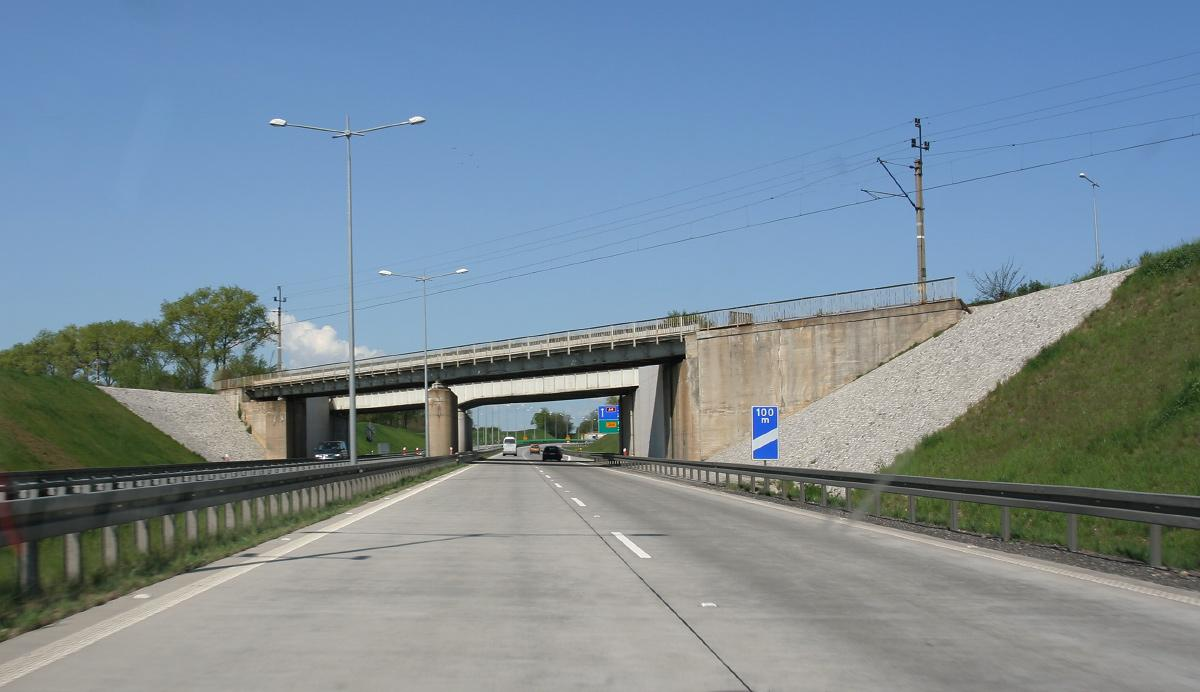
Viaduct of Legnica–Jerzmanice-Zdrój railway over the A4 motorway (2008)

The railway begins at Legnica railway station, located in the city center. Initially, it runs westward, parallel to Wrocław Muchobór–Gubinek railway, and then turns southwest. Outside the city, the railway runs along voivodeship road 364 toward Złotoryja, and after Pawłowice Małe, it crosses over the A4 motorway. At the 21.282-kilometer mark, it reaches Złotoryja railway station. The elevation difference between the Legnica and Złotoryja stations is 74 m.

Further on, the railway is more winding and runs along voivodeship road 364 and the Kaczawa river. At the 24.276-kilometer mark, it reaches Jerzmanice-Zdrój station, where the section of the railway classified as No. 284 and managed by PKP Polskie Linie Kolejowe ends. It also marks the end of the electrified section served by freight trains. The elevation difference between this station and the former Złotoryja station is 13 m. Throughout the entire section, the railway runs – according to Jerzy Kondracki's physical-geographical classification – through the Legnica Plain, the Chojnów Plain, and the Kaczawa Foothills, and administratively through the city of Legnica and the counties of Legnica and Złotoryja.

The section beyond Jerzmanice-Zdrój railway station, which is closed to rail traffic, turns west toward Lwówek Śląski railway station and connects with Jelenia Góra–Żagań railway. The elevation difference between them is 9 m. In this part, the railway runs through the Kaczawa Foothills, and, administratively, through the Złotoryja and Lwówek counties. The section between Lwówek Śląski and Gryfów Śląski has been dismantled. It ran partly along voivodeship road 297.

From the Gryfów Śląski railway station to the Mirsk railway station, the railway has been numbered 317 since 1999 and is managed by the Lower Silesian Road and Railway Service in Wrocław. It heads south, parallel to national road 30. It connects with Wrocław Świebodzki–Zgorzelec railway, and then turns southwest, reaching the former Mirsk railway station at kilometer 80.244. The elevation difference between the stations of Gryfów Śląski and Mirsk is 29 m. Beyond the former Mirsk railway station, the railway has been dismantled. It turns westward toward the Polish-Czech border between the stations of Pobiedna and Jindřichovice pod Smrkem. The section between Gryfów Śląski and the state border lies in the Jizera Foothills, and administratively in the Lwówek and Lubań counties.

== History ==
=== Origins, construction of the railway, and operation until 1945 ===
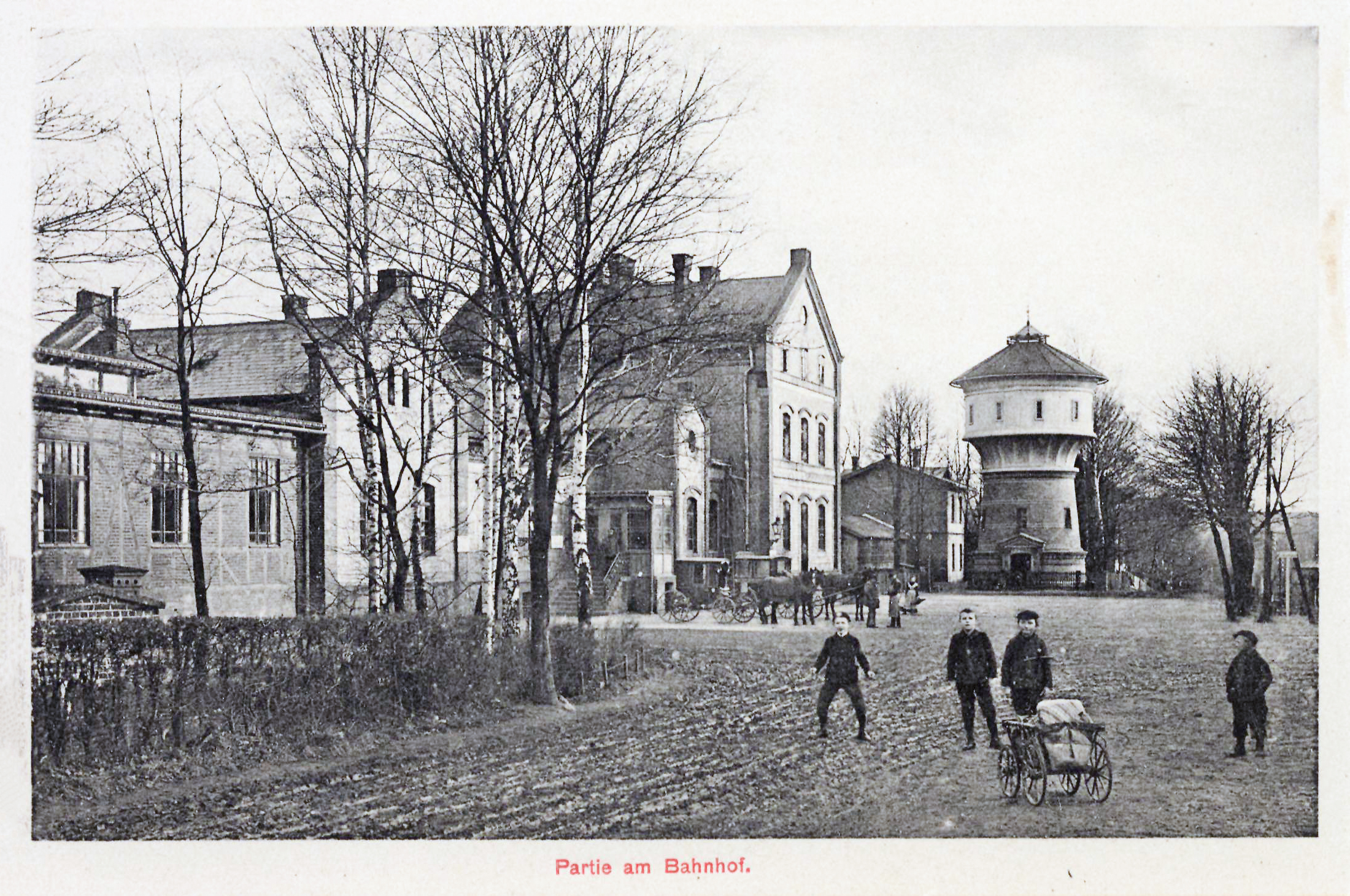
Gryfów Śląski railway station (c. 1900)

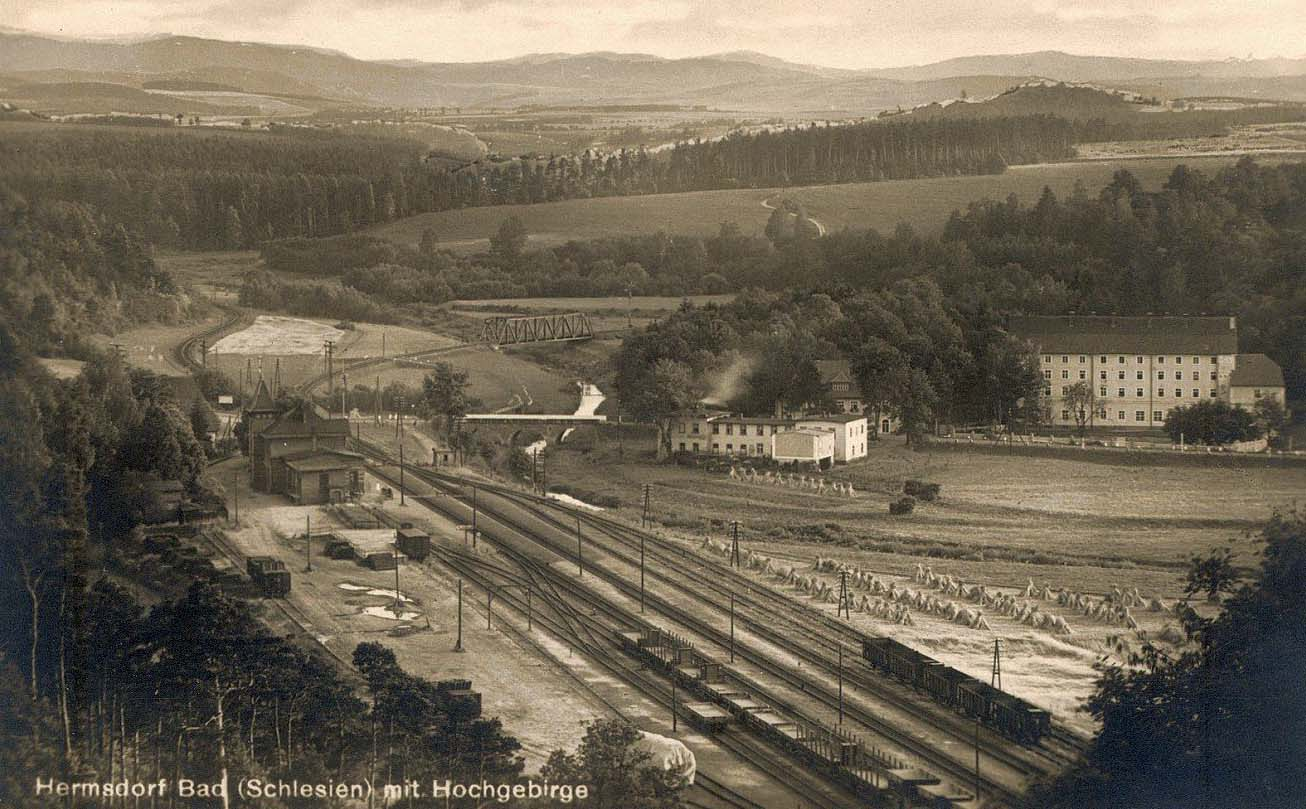
Jerzmanice-Zdrój railway station in the interwar period

In the counties through which Legnica–Jerzmanice-Zdrój railway ran along its original route from the 1880s, stagnation was particularly noticeable due to the outflow of the population to large industrial centers, caused by the decline of traditional crafts (mainly traditional linen production and cottage weaving) and the lack of convenient transportation routes. The decision to build a connection between Mirsk and Legnica, partly as a branch of the Silesian Mountain Railway, was made in 1882. It was then that the Landtag of Prussia decided to build the railway and allocated funds for its construction. Its purpose was to revitalize the local economy.

Construction of the railway proceeded in stages, starting from Legnica toward Mirsk, and the first section connected Legnica with Złotoryja. It was opened on 15 October 1884 to serve transport from mines and quarries, as well as the transport of agricultural products. The next section from Złotoryja to Jerzmanice-Zdrój was put into service on 16 September 1895. Along with this section, a spur line to the quarry in Złotoryja was also opened.

The section from Jerzmanice-Zdrój to Gryfów Śląski was built as compensation for the closure of the military base in Lwówek Śląski. It was opened in stages: the section from Lwówek Śląski to Gryfów Śląski on 15 October 1885, the section from Nowa Wieś Grodziska to Lwówek Śląski on 1 December 1895, and the section from Jerzmanice-Zdrój to Nowa Wieś Grodziska on 15 May 1896. The section from Gryfów Śląski to Mirsk was officially opened on 1 November 1884.

The entire railway was further extended to the border with Austria-Hungary. Several factors had a decisive influence on the construction of the section from Mirsk to the state border, including improved relations with Austria-Hungary, centuries-old cultural ties, and the opening of the private Frýdlant District Railway (German: Friedländer Bezirksbahn) in 1902. The section from Mirsk to Pobiedna was opened on 19 May 1897, and the railway was extended to the then-border between the German Empire and Austria-Hungary on 1 November 1904. Consequently, the station in Jindřichovice was expanded with side wings. Three pairs of trains crossed the border daily, and their passengers, after passing through customs, could transfer to trains heading deeper into Bohemia.

From the beginning, the section from Mirsk to the state border was of secondary importance, and trains with 2nd- and 3rd-class cars ran on this route. However, it was popular among local residents, tourists, and spa guests due to the opportunity to take rail tours around the Jizera Mountains. The average travel time on this section was 25–27 minutes, and by the end of World War II, it had increased to 41 minutes.

=== Polish People's Republic period ===
After the Polish State Railways took over the entire railway, rail service on this section was reorganized; most notably, passenger train service was extended to Świeradów-Zdrój railway station. In 1945, the entire railway was designated as railway no. 284; passenger service was suspended on the section from Mirsk to Pobiedna, and the railway was discontinued on the section from Pobiedna to the state border.

Further attempts to partially discontinue the railway were made in the 1950s. In November 1950, rail service from Lwówek Śląski to Świeradów-Zdrój was discontinued. For this reason, the Presidium of the County National Council in Lwówek Śląski appealed to the Railway Directorate in Wrocław to resume service, which was ultimately achieved.

A significant decline in the railway's operations occurred in the 1980s and 1990s. It began with the suspension in 1983 of passenger train service on the section from Lwówek Śląski to Gryfów Śląski, and the section from Mirsk to Pobiedna was suspended on 1 July 1987 by an order dated 30 April of that year. Simultaneously with the suspension of passenger service, the section from Legnica to Jerzmanice-Zdrój was electrified on 30 November 1988.

=== After 1989 ===
After the political and economic changes in Poland, Legnica–Jerzmanice-Zdrój railway continued to decline, with individual sections being closed or discontinued. Passenger service was suspended on the following sections: Jerzmanice-Zdrój–Lwówek Śląski on 10 October 1991, Legnica–Jerzmanice-Zdrój on 1 June 1996, and Gryfów Śląski–Mirsk on 12 December 1996.

Freight service was suspended, and the following sections were closed: Jerzmanice-Zdrój–Gryfów Śląski in 1992, and Gryfów Śląski–Mirsk on 1 January 2001 or possibly as early as 1998.

The section from Lwówek Śląski to Lubomierz was dismantled on 1 January 1996. The land along the decommissioned railway was transferred to local governments, which initiated the construction of an asphalt bike path on the site of the railway after 2000.

In 2012, local governments launched an initiative to build a bicycle path on the impassable section from Jerzmanice-Zdrój to Lwówek Śląski, but this did not happen due to financial constraints. Plans to use Legnica–Jerzmanice-Zdrój railway and Nowa Wieś Grodziska–Bolesławiec Wschód railway for freight transport following KGHM's potential return to the Old Copper Basin in February 2013 were also not implemented.

Since 2014, the voivodeship government has expressed its intention to take over the railway between Jerzmanice-Zdrój and Lwówek Śląski. On 4 October 2018, the voivodeship board adopted a resolution on this matter, expressing its intention to take over 22 railway sections from the Polish State Railways, including the 24-kilometer section from Jerzmanice Zdrój to Lwówek Śląski, the 32-kilometer Ostrzeszów–Namysłaki railway, and the 37-kilometer railway from Marciszów to Jerzmanice Zdrój. The Lower Silesian Provincial Executive Board finally granted approval on 9 January 2019 for the acquisition of the disused, dilapidated, and overgrown railway from Jerzmanice Zdrój to Lwówek Śląski, as well as Boguszów-Gorce Wschód–Mieroszów, Kobierzyce–Piława Górna, Krzelów–Leszno Dworzec Mały, and Nowa Ruda Słupiec–Ścinawka Średnia railways, along with the right of perpetual use of the land and buildings associated with the railway, was finally granted by the Lower Silesian Voivodeship Board on 9 January 2019. The formal takeover of the railways by the Lower Silesian Voivodeship local government took place on 29 April 2019. The 2018 plan for regionally significant transport investments in the Lower Silesian Voivodeship, funded by the ERDF 2014–2020, stipulated that by the end of 2019, the marshal should have an environmental decision and a building permit for the section from Jerzmanice Zdrój to Lwówek Śląski. It was estimated that the revitalization of the railway from Jerzmanice Zdrój to Lwówek Śląski would cost PLN 42.5 million, of which slightly over PLN 36 million was to come from the Regional Operational Program. The tender for construction work was expected in the first quarter of 2020, and completion was scheduled for mid-2021.

==== Attempt to resume passenger service between Legnica and Jerzmanice-Zdrój ====
An attempt was made to partially reactivate the railway, specifically on the section from Legnica to Jerzmanice-Zdrój. The first passenger train departed on 14 December 2008, thirteen years after service was suspended, and approximately 20 people used the inaugural service. In the first few months, three pairs of trains operated on the section from Wrocław Główny to Jerzmanice-Zdrój, powered by EN57 multiple units. The travel time between Złotoryja and Wrocław Główny was 2 hours and 15 minutes.

On 1 March 2009, train service was limited to Saturdays and Sundays, and the number of train pairs was reduced to two. Ultimately, passenger service was suspended again on 1 September 2009. The reasons cited for the suspension included the exclusion of these routes from the "Cheap Ticket" promotion, the failure to adapt the schedule to residents' needs, and the trains' very low operating speed (approximately 25 km/h).

=== Restoration of passenger service to Mirsk ===
Since the suspension of rail service to Mirsk and onward to Świeradów-Zdrój, several initiatives have emerged regarding the reactivation of the railway. Ultimately, on 8 June 2020, a notarial deed was drawn up under which the Lower Silesian Voivodeship took over Gryfów Śląski–Świeradów-Zdrój railway from the Polish State Railways. At the end of May 2021, the first works began on the revitalization of Gryfów Śląski–Świeradów-Zdrój and Mirsk–Świeradów Nadleśnictwo railways.

On 7 December 2023, the opening ceremony for the Gryfów Śląski–Mirsk–Świeradów-Zdrój railway took place, and the first regular passenger service began three days later. Thus, after 27 years, Świeradów-Zdrój and Mirsk regained passenger rail service.

In 2013, and then in 2018, a concept was proposed to rebuild the Mirsk–Jindřichovice railway; however, in 2024, due to the cost-benefit analysis and the expected low number of passengers, this concept was abandoned. The 2013 Jizera Mountains Railway project envisaged the reconstruction of the Gryfów Śląski–Mirsk–Jindřichovice railway near Świeradów Zdrój. The stations in Mirsk and Pobiedna were planned to be converted into cultural and tourist centers, and train service was to be operated by a Czech carrier.

On 11 October 2023, PKP Polskie Linie Kolejowe signed a contract with Infrakol worth over PLN 210 million for the design and execution, by 2026, of construction works as part of the project "Revitalization of the Legnica–Złotoryja – Jerzmanice-Zdrój to integrate Złotoryja and the Złotoryja County into the regional provincial rail transport network". Thanks to the replacement of tracks and the overhead contact line, speeds of up to 120 km/h are expected to be possible. The estimated travel time from Złotoryja to Wrocław is expected to be approximately 62–70 minutes, and to Legnica approximately 17 minutes. The construction of the Legnica Zachodnia station and the renovation of the Pawłowice Małe station are planned. The remaining stations (Wilczyce, Kozów) will be demolished, and the plan to build the Złotoryja Zalew station has also been abandoned. The contract for the revitalization work was signed in mid-March 2026.

== Technical specifications ==
=== Legnica–Jerzmanice-Zdrój railway ===
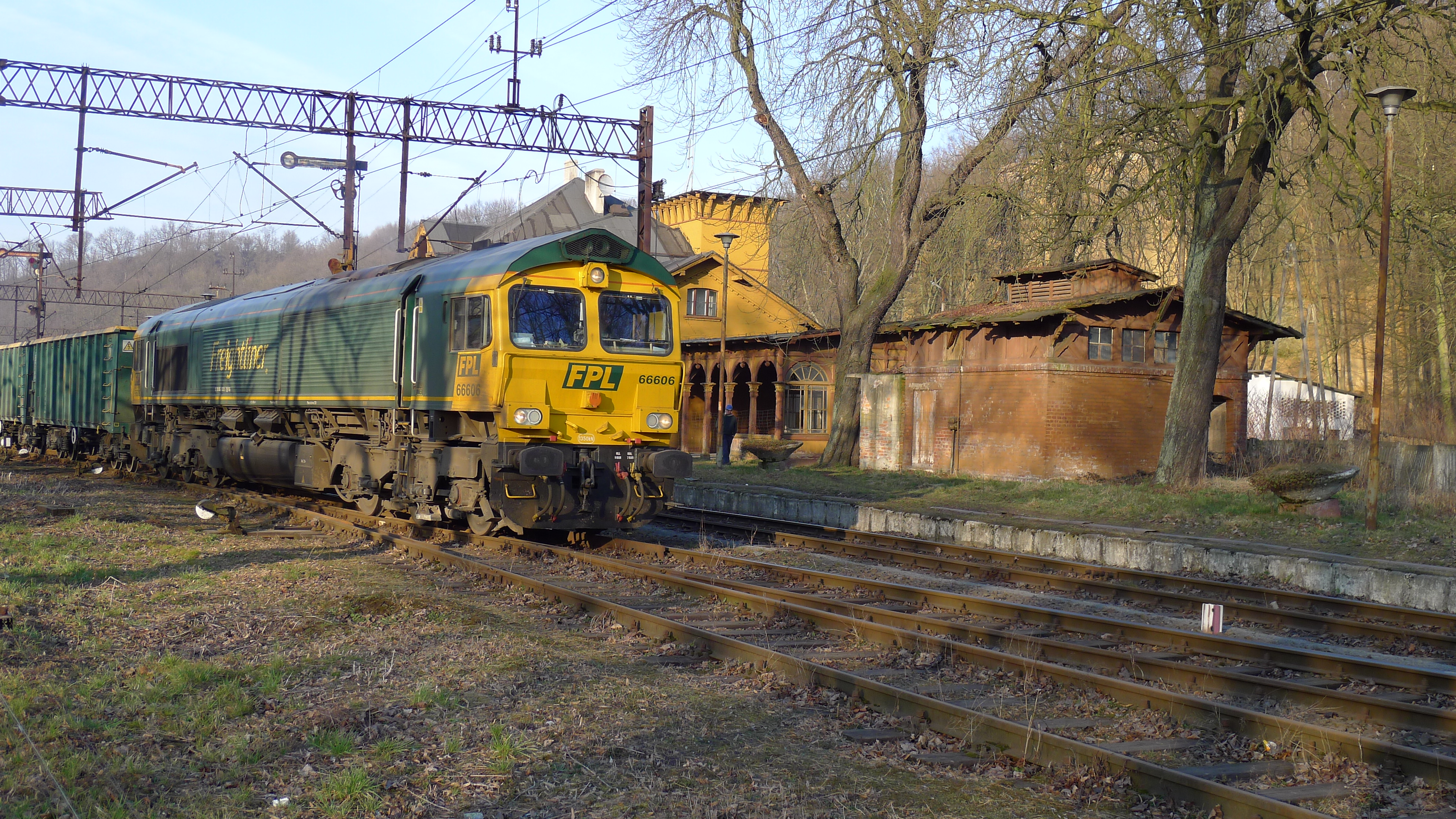
Freight train at the Jerzmanice-Zdrój railway station heading toward Wilków

This section is 24.787 km long. It is managed by PKP Polskie Linie Kolejowe. The railway is single-track and almost entirely electrified, and is also equipped with electromagnetic automatic train braking systems.

The elevation difference between the Legnica and Jerzmanice-Zdrój stations is 87 m, and the average gradient of the railway is 3.6‰.

As of 2018, the following maximum speeds and line classes apply on this section:

Kilometre		Class	Speed (km/h)		
From	To	Class	Passenger	Railbuses	Freight
−0.403	0.422	C3	20	20	20
0.422	6.800	C3	50	50	50
6.800	7.800	C3	20	20	20
7.800	16.250	C3	40	40	40
16.250	20.570	C3	40	40	40
20.570	24.384	C3	20	20	20

=== Jerzmanice-Zdrój–Gryfów Śląski section ===
This part was originally 47.205 km long. The section between Lubomierz and Lwówek Śląski was dismantled in 1996. The remaining portion is single-track and not electrified.

The elevation difference between the Jerzmanice-Zdrój station and the Gryfów Śląski station is 121 m, and the average gradient of the railway is 1.7‰.

=== Gryfów Śląski–Świeradów-Zdrój railway ===
This section is 8.763 km long and is managed by the Lower Silesian Road and Railway Service in Wrocław. The railway is single-track and non-electrified, and lacks automatic train braking electromagnets.

The elevation difference between Gryfów Śląski and the Mirsk stations is 29 m, and the average gradient of the line is 3.3‰.

=== Mirsk–state border section ===
Before its complete demolition, this section was 7.643 km long. It was single-track and non-electrified. There were two bridges on it.

The elevation difference between the Mirsk station and the former Pobiedna station is 54 m, and the average gradient of the line is 8.8‰.

== Infrastructure ==
=== Traffic control posts ===
Name	km	Type	No. of platform edges	Infrastructure	Photo
Legnica–Jerzmanice-Zdrój railway
Legnica	0.000	station	8	railway station building (ticket office, waiting room), station hall (5 platforms), freight forwarding buildings, goods sheds and loading areas, locomotive depot, water tower (disused), 5 signal boxes	
Pawłowice Małe	7.259	station	2	railway station building (signal box), subsidiary signal box, toilet, loading area	
Wilczyce	11.183	station	2	railway station building (warehouse, signal box), loading area, toilet, residential and utility buildings	
Kozów	16.106	station	2	railway station building (warehouse, signal box), loading area	
Radomil (closed)	19.958	station	1	none	
Złotoryja	21.282	public loading point and station	3	railway station building (warehouse, loading ramp), additional warehouse with loading areas, 3 signal boxes, engine shed, 2 water towers	
Jerzmanice-Zdrój	24.276	station	3	railway station building (warehouse, signal box), subsidiary signal box, toilet, utility outbuildings, loading area	
Jerzmanice-Zdrój–Gryfów Śląski section
Pielgrzymka	31.282	station	1	railway station building (warehouse, signal box), toilet, utility outbuilding, loading area and side-end ramp	
Czaple	34.571	station		none	
Nowa Wieś Grodziska	35.541	station	2	railway station building (warehouse, signal box), toilet, utility outbuilding, water tower, engine shed, loading area and side-end ramp	
Skorzynice	40.136	station	1	railway station building (warehouse, signal box), toilet, utility outbuilding, loading area and side-end ramp	
Płakowice (closed)	45.609	station	1	shelter	
Lwówek Śląski	48.572	station	4	railway station building (warehouse, signal box), toilet, utility outbuilding, loading area and side-end ramp, engine shed, 2 water towers, signal box	
Mojesz (closed)	51.827	station	1	none	
Pławna Dolna (closed)	54.056	station	2	none	
Pławna Średnia (closed)	56.732	station	2	railway station building (warehouse, signal box), toilet, utility outbuilding, loading area and side-end ramp	
Pławna Górna (closed)	61.453	station	1	none	
Lubomierz (closed)	64.532	station	2	railway station building (warehouse, signal box), toilet, utility outbuilding, loading area and side-end ramp	
Oleszna Podgórska (closed)	66.440	station	1	none	
Gryfów Śląski	71.481	station	4	railway station building, warehouse, engine shed, 2 signal boxes, water tower, residential building, utility outbuildings, loading area and side-end ramp	
Gryfów Śląski–Świeradów-Zdrój railway
Proszówka	74.758	station	1	railway station building (warehouse), loading area and side ramp	
Brzeziniec (closed)	77.398	station	1	none	
Mirsk	80.244	station	1 (formerly 3)	railway station building (warehouse, signal box), subsidiary signal box, toilet, water tower, 2 loading areas	
Mirsk–state border section
Wolimierz (closed)	85.134	station	1	none	
Pobiedna (closed)	86.347	station	2	railway station building (warehouse, signal box), toilet, loading area and side-end ramp	

== Operations ==
On the section from Gryfów Śląski to Mirsk, which is part of Gryfów Śląski–Świeradów-Zdrój railway, passenger service to Świeradów-Zdrój operated by Lower Silesian Railways has been in operation since 10 December 2023.

For freight traffic, the entire Legnica–Jerzmanice-Zdrój railway is in service along its current route. It is operated mainly to serve the quarries in Wilków.
