= Lwówek Śląski railway station =

Railway station in Lwówek Śląski, Poland

Lwówek Śląski
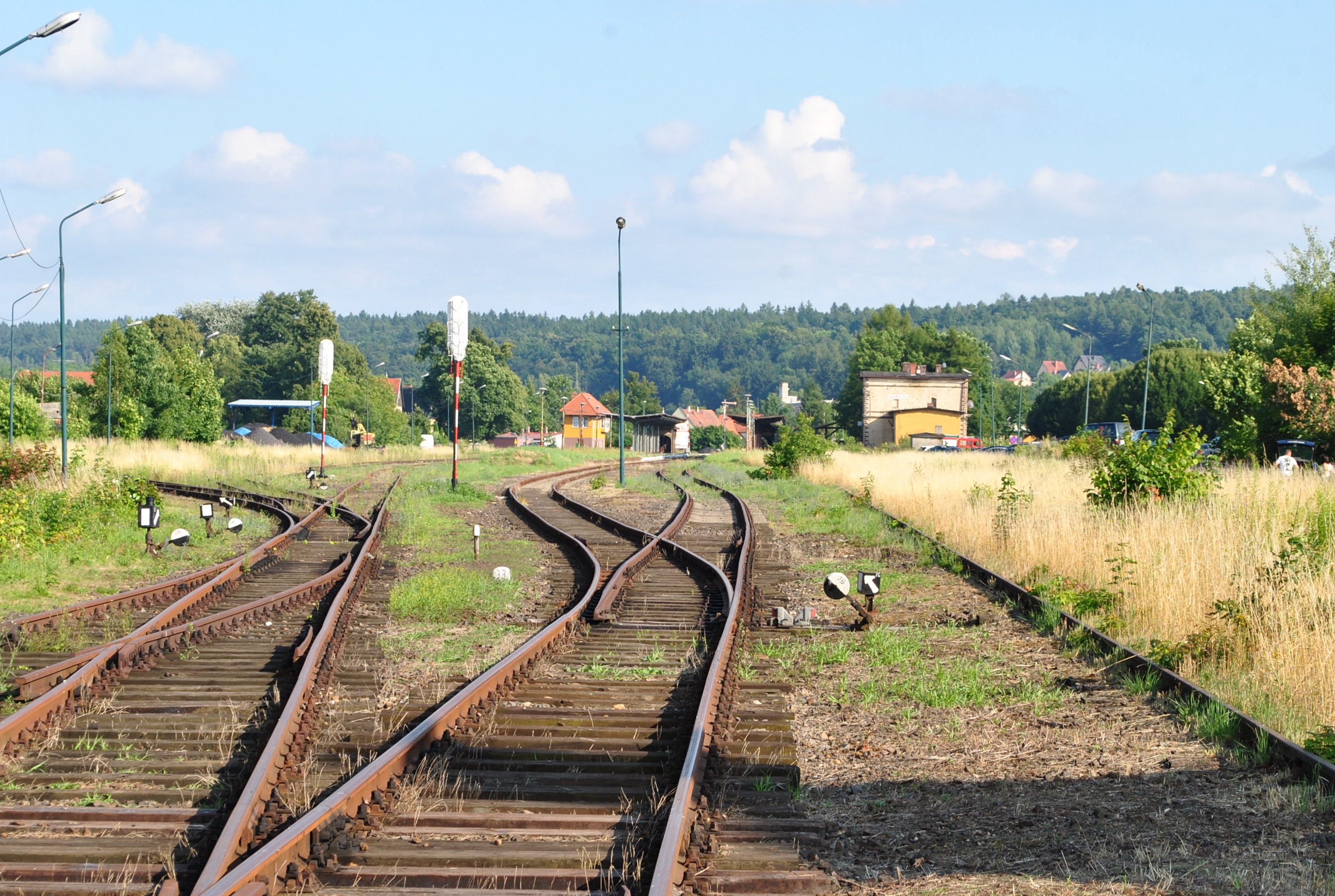
- General view of the station from the north

General information
- Location: Lwówek Śląski, Lower Silesian Voivodeship; Poland
- Coordinates: 51°06′34″N 15°35′36″E
- Elevation: 211 m (692 ft)
- Manager: Die Reichsbahndirektion Breslau (until 1939); Polish State Railways (from 1945)
- Lines: Jelenia Góra–Żagań; Legnica–Jerzmanice-Zdrój

History
- Opened: October 15, 1885
- Former names: Löwenberg (Schlesien) (1885–1945); Lwówek nad Bobrem (1945–1946)
Location
- Location within Poland Location within Lower Silesian Voivodeship

Lwówek Śląski is a disused railway station in Lwówek Śląski, Lower Silesian Voivodeship, Poland. The station opened in 1885, along with the construction of the line from Gryfów Śląski. It used to play a significant role in passenger traffic as a railway junction, from which lines branched out in four directions: to Gryfów Śląski, Jelenia Góra, Jerzmanice-Zdrój, and Zebrzydowa.

It closed in 2018. The station belongs to the regional division of Polish State Railways in Wrocław and the Railway Line Plant in Wałbrzych.

== Location ==
The station is located in the central part of Lwówek Śląski, east of the Old Town, approximately 600 m from Freedom Square. It is bordered by Andrzej Struga Street (to the east), Betleja Street (provincial road no. 364, to the south), and Dworcowa and Rzeczna streets (to the west). Administratively, the station is situated in the Lower Silesian Voivodeship, in Lwówek County, within Gmina Lwówek Śląski.

The station is located at an elevation of 211 m above sea level.

== History ==
=== Pre World War II ===
The construction of the railway line to Lwówek Śląski, and consequently the station, was prompted by the closure of the military unit in the town and its relocation to Legnica, with the railway line serving as compensation for its closure. The first section, opened on 15 October 1885, connected the station with Gryfów Śląski. At that time, Lwówek Śląski was the terminus. In 1895, the line was extended to Nowa Wieś Grodziska, with this section being put into use on 1 December 1895. The importance of the station in Lwówek Śląski increased to the rank of a junction station 1904.

On 20 July 1904, the northern, less technically complex section of the Jelenia Góra–Żagań railway, connecting with Zebrzydowa, was opened. The connection with Jelenia Góra was chronologically the last newly built line to Lwówek Śląski. The Jelenia Góra–Lwówek Śląski railway was opened in stages: the Wleń–Lwówek Śląski section came into operation on 1 July 1909, and the entire Jelenia Góra–Lwówek Śląski section was officially opened on July 28 of that year, resulting in railway lines from Lwówek Śląski extending in four directions, making the station a major railway junction. Along with the last two sections, part of the Jelenia Góra–Żagań railway, the station was modernised. Canopies over the platforms and an underground passage were built, and the station tracks behind the platforms were slightly rebuilt and extended. Two signal boxes were also constructed. The construction of this line led to the economic development of the town, including industry and tourism.

=== Post World War II ===
After 1945, the entire railway infrastructure at the station came under the management of Polish State Railways. The station was renamed to Lwówek nad Bobrem, and later to its modern name, Lwówek Śląski, in 1946. This period marked the beginning of the slow decline of the station's significance within the railway network structure in Lower Silesia, exacerbated by economic changes starting in 1989. Connections to Jelenia Góra were reestablished on 10 November 1946 after the reconstruction of tunnel entrances and bridge abutments destroyed by the Nazis in May 1945. In the 1950s, the first attempts to eliminate connections from Lwówek Śląski were made. In November 1950, the railway connection to Świeradów-Zdrój was discontinued. As a result, the Presidium of the County National Council in Lwówek Śląski appealed to the Regional Directorate of State Railways in Wrocław to resume traffic, which was ultimately achieved. Despite this, the connection was partially discontinued later on – in 1983, passenger services on the Gryfów Śląski–Lwówek Śląski section were suspended, and the section to Lubomierz was closed. Meanwhile, between 1960 and 1970, four sidings, a garage for railcars, and a side ramp were constructed. On 1 October 1991, passenger services on the Lwówek Śląski–Nowa Wieś Grodziska section were suspended, and the line was abolished in 1992. On 31 March 1996, passenger services on the Lwówek Śląski–Zebrzydowa route were withdrawn but resumed on 9 December 2007. This connection was discontinued again on 12 December 2010, and after 23 days resumed once again (on 3 January 2011), with Lower Silesian Railways. This section was closed again on December 11 of that year.

== Station ==
=== Railway lines ===
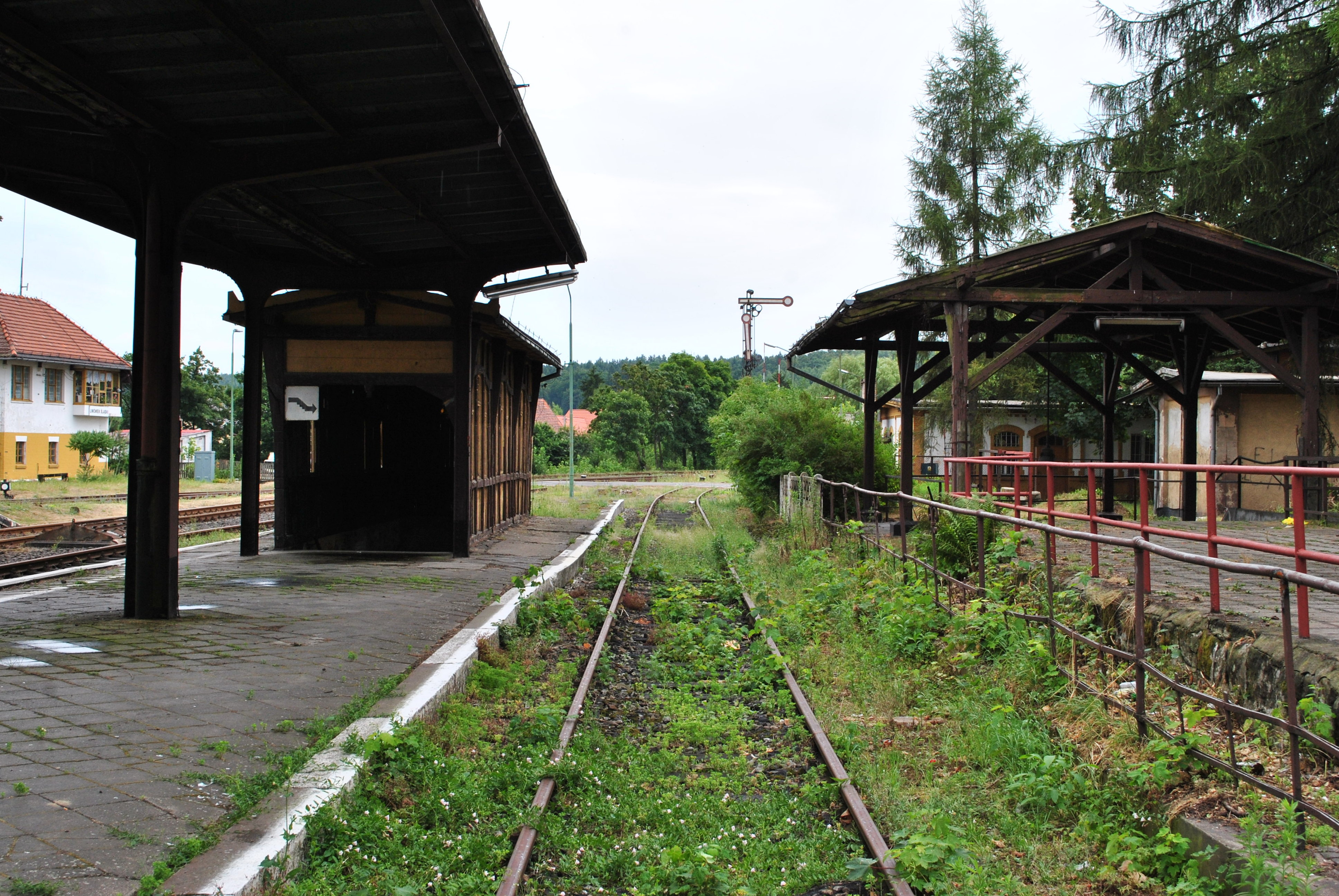
Track towards Jelenia Góra at the level of the railroad station

Lwówek Śląski railway station originally functioned as a junction station. The following lines run through it:

- Line 283: Jelenia Góra–Ławszowa (formerly Jelenia Góra–Żagań; 10th operational post; 32.636 km; passenger and freight traffic to Lwówek Śląski railway station, freight traffic beyond);
- Former line 284: Legnica–Pobiedna (13th operational post; 48.572 km; the line is impassable and dismantled beyond Lwówek Śląski railway station).

The track layout has been rebuilt multiple times, the last reconstruction taking place at the end of 2013. As of 9 January 2014, the station has 4 tracks at the platforms (tracks 1, 4, 6, and 8) and a siding (track 3). The freight group tracks (5, 7, and 9) and other sidings at the ramps (10, 12, 14, and 18) have been dismantled. Tracks 11 and 13 serve as garages for PKP Polskie Linie Kolejowe trolleys. The previous track layout included 2 main primary tracks, 1 additional main track, and 9 sidings, including 3 loading tracks and 3 traction tracks.

=== Railway station with warehouse ===
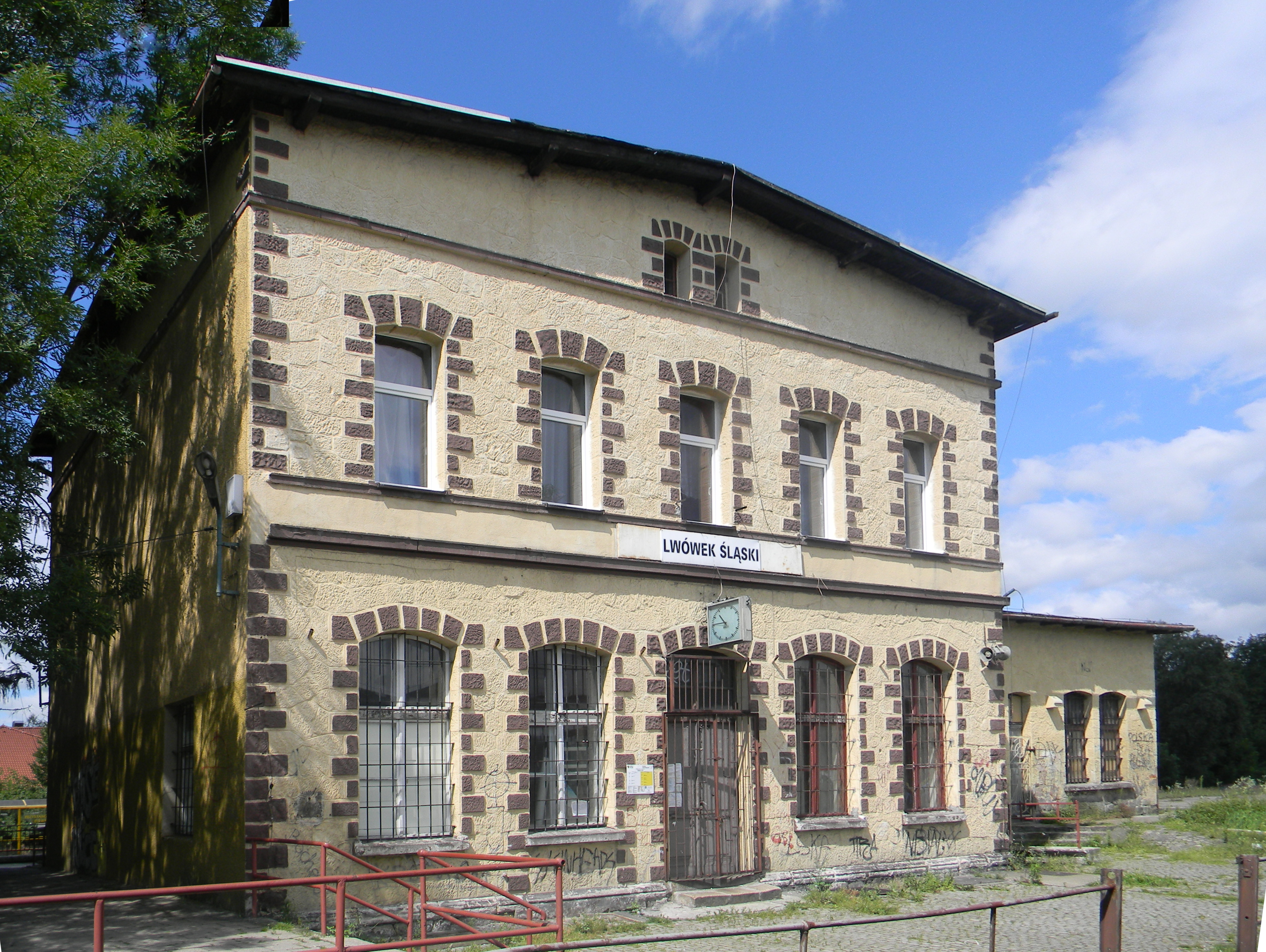
Station building from the side of the tracks

The railway station, dating back to 1885, is located on the western side of the station, at 1 Dworcowa Street. The station building is two-story and masonry, currently serving mainly residential purposes. Attached to the station is a warehouse with a loading ramp. The entire complex has undergone renovations in the past. Originally, the station had a wooden-masonry extension with a veranda (on the southern side) and additional warehouses (on the northern side).

Originally, the building housed a waiting room, ticket office, buffet, office rooms, communication and service areas, and employee apartments on the upper floor.

=== Platforms ===
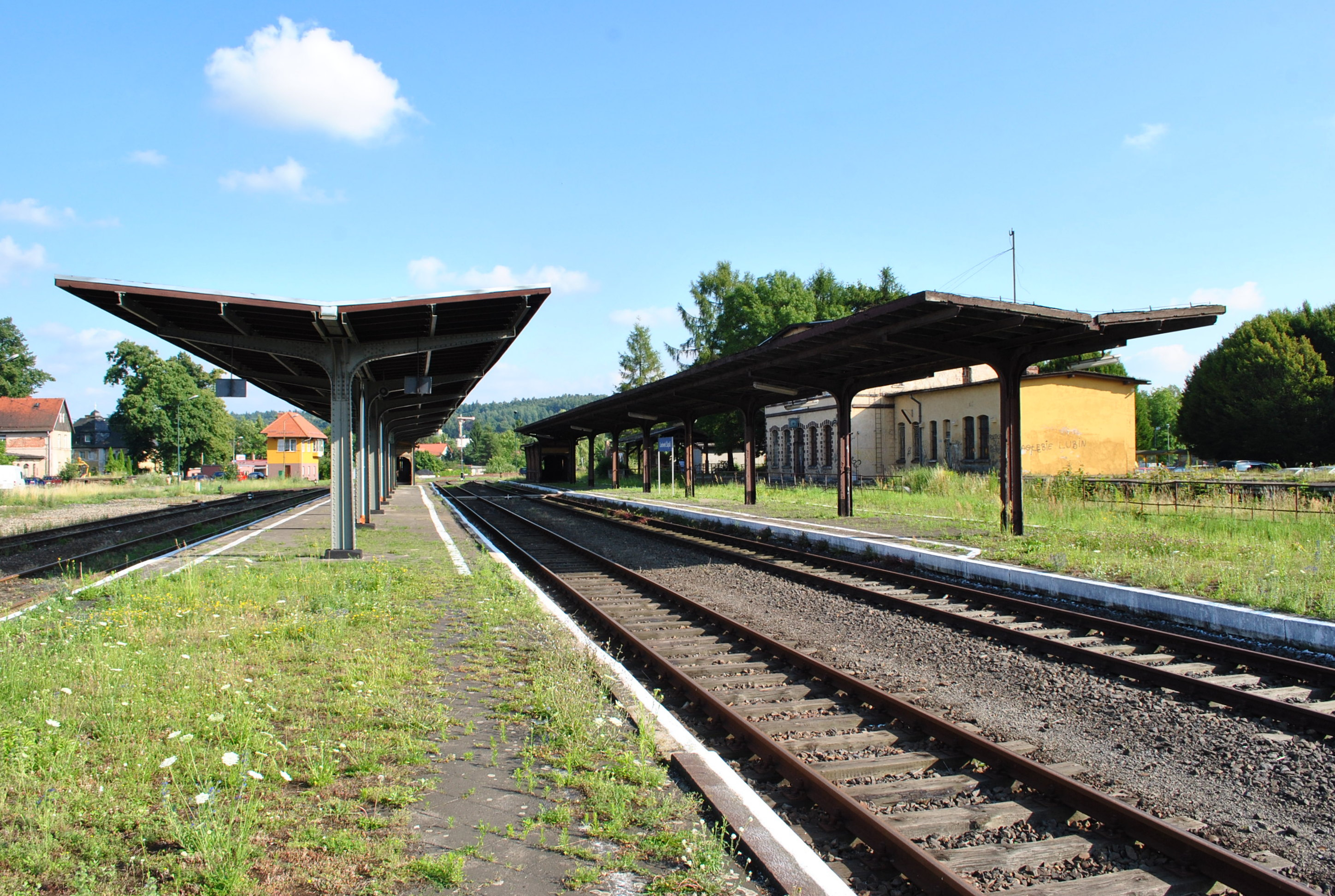
1st and 2nd platform at the station (view towards Jelenia Góra)

The station has 2 island platforms, each 0.25 m high. Platform 1 is 235 m long, and platform 2 is 230 m long. The platforms have a mixed surface of concrete slabs and gravel or slag-enhanced ground. They are partially covered and equipped with sound systems. Access to them is via underground passages with covered, wooden entrances. Originally, the platforms were earthen without canopies or underground passages, constructed between 1904 and 1909 with the Jelenia Góra–Żagań railway line.

In mid-2014, the canopy over platform 2 was renovated. The roof was replaced, new drainage was installed, and the steel elements of the canopy were secured and painted. The renovation cost approximately 260,000 PLN.

=== Railway traffic control facilities ===
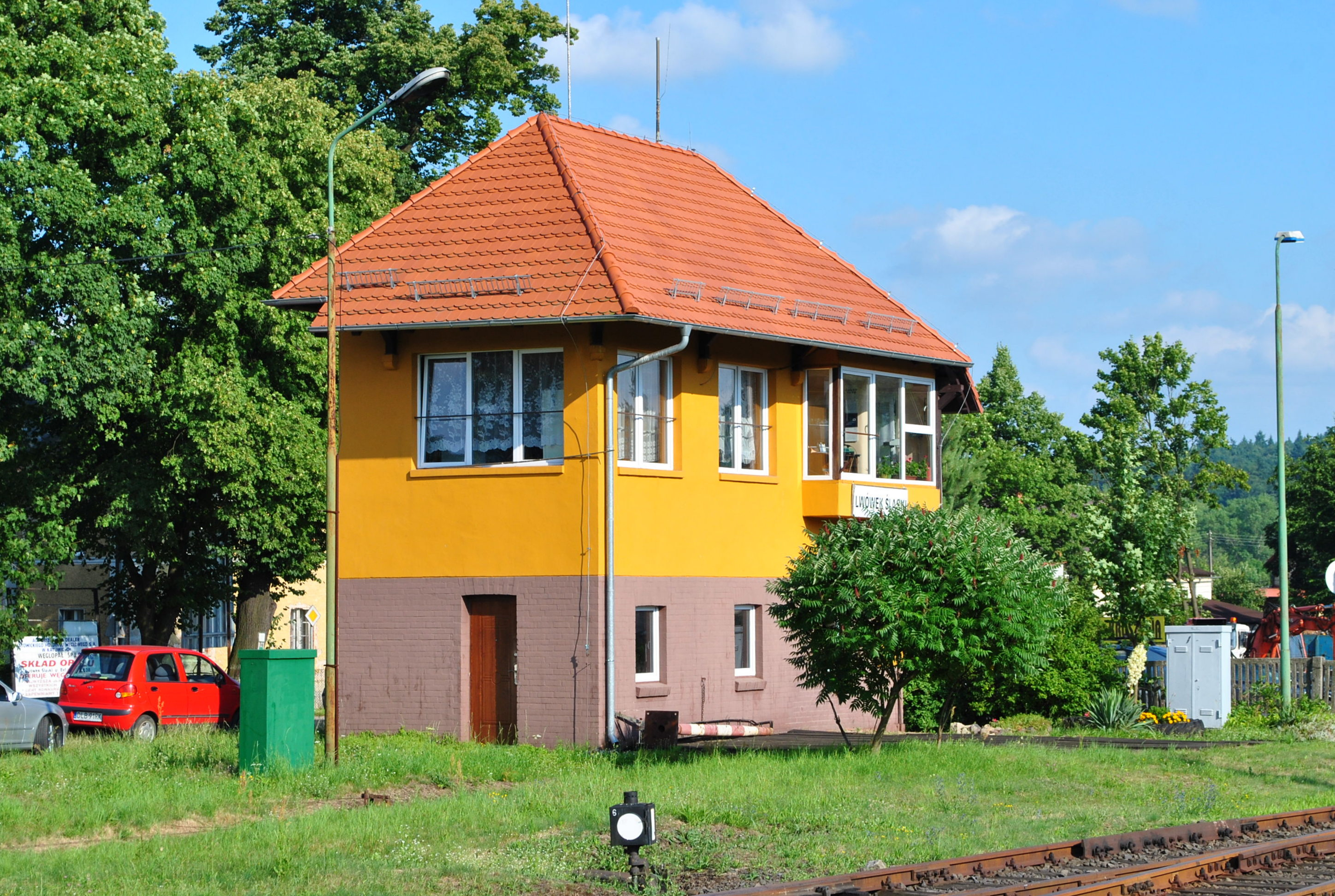
Signal box LS

The station's railway traffic control facilities mainly feature mechanical devices. In the direction of Jelenia Góra, there are railway signals, while the entry signal from Niwnice is a light signal.

During the station's expansion at the beginning of the 20th century, two signal boxes were built. In 2006 or 2007, the signal box on the Zebrzydowa side was dismantled. The operational signal box LS (located towards Jelenia Góra) is still in use.

=== Engine house ===
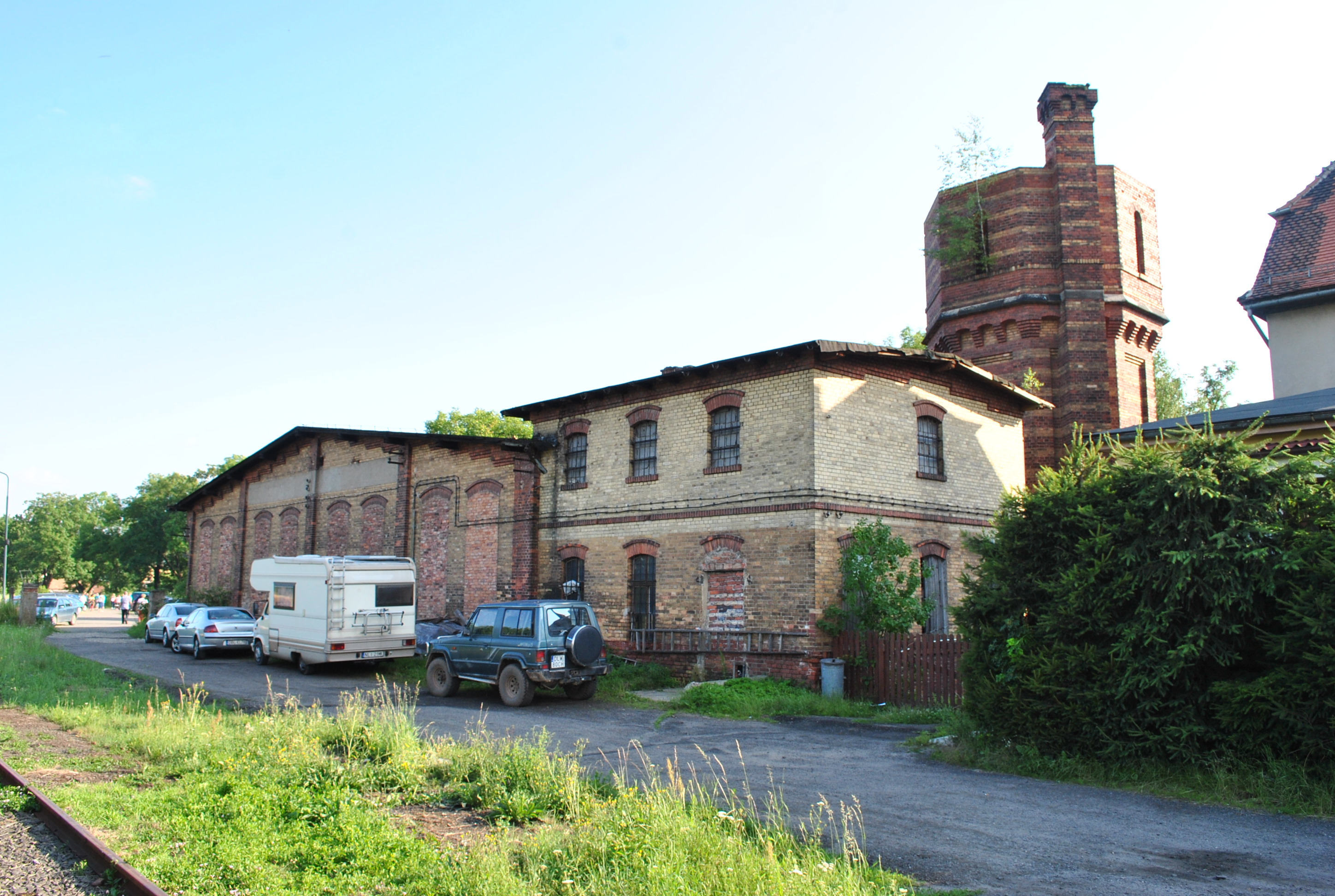
Former engine house and water tower

The station includes a former four-stall engine house with technical facilities and its own water tower. It had one inspection channel and a turntable. The old engine house is located at the northern exit from the station, west of the main tracks, now housing a building materials wholesale business.

=== Water towers ===
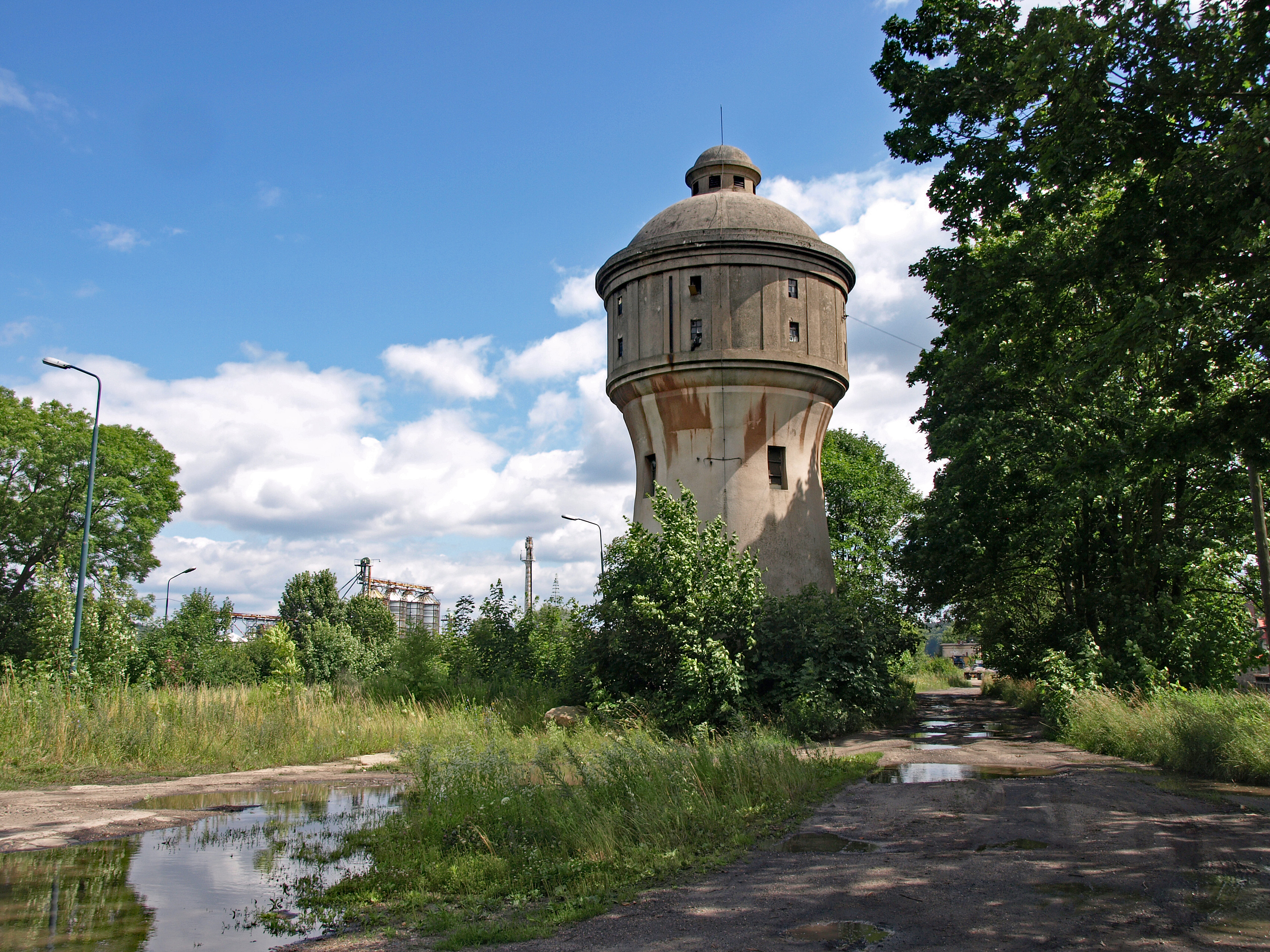
Concrete water tower

The station has two water towers:

- a round concrete tower, approximately 300 m north, with a 20,000-liter capacity, built-in 1926. It is in good condition and used for railway facilities and employee housing;
- a brick tower near the engine house, about 700 m north, built around 1895 with an intact water tank but in a ruined state without a roof.

=== Sidings ===
The station has two sidings:

- a siding for the Brewery Plants;
- a siding for the grain processing plant with silos.

=== Additional infrastructure ===
According to the 1905 records, the station also included restrooms, a utility building, two loading yards with a crane and a side-front ramp, three water cranes, and a wagon scale. Currently, garages, workshops, and a road safety building for PKP Polskie Linie Kolejowe are present and in use.

== Passenger train traffic ==
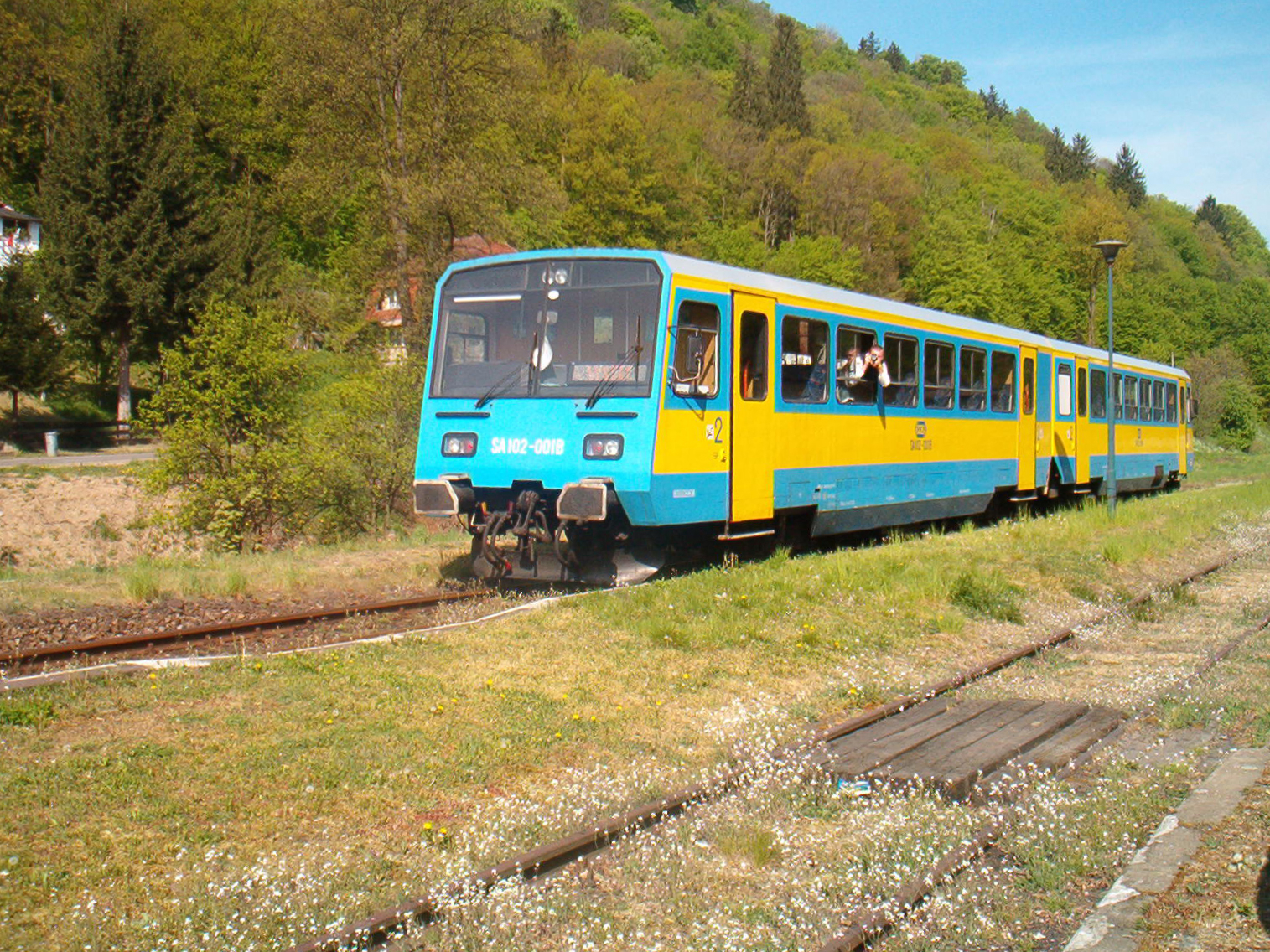
SA102 on the route from Jelenia Góra to Lwówek Śląski (2007)

Lwówek Śląski railway station plays a regional role in passenger traffic, with only regional trains stopping there. According to the 2013/2014 timetable, trains on the D62 route Jelenia Góra–Lwówek Śląski (4 pairs on weekdays, 3 pairs on weekends) ran to this station. The travel time from and to Jelenia Góra was 1 hour and 14 minutes, operated by Lower Silesian Railways.

From 2014, many connections on the Jelenia Góra–Lwówek Śląski route were replaced by bus services due to rolling stock issues. From December 2014, daily connections on this route were discontinued, with a weekend connection from Wrocław Główny to Jelenia Góra via Legnica, Zebrzydowa, and Lwówek Śląski introduced.

=== Connections ===
Period	Destination station	Number of connections	Sources
1980/1981	Jelenia Góra Świeradów Zdrój Legnica Węgliniec Żagań/Poznań Główny Żagań/Szczecin Główny Zebrzydowa Złotoryja	8 4 3 1 1 1 1 1	
2000/2001	Jelenia Góra	5	
2013/2014	Jelenia Góra	4	

== Connections ==
In front of the station building, there is a large bus stop from which, according to data from 22 January 2014, buses depart to more than 30 destinations. The main destinations include: Bolesławiec, Gryfów Śląski, Jelenia Góra.

== Bibliography ==
- Bossowski, Józef Andrzej (2002). Kolej w dolinie Bobru (in Polish). Częstochowa: CMYK-ART. ISBN 83-917138-1-4.
