= Gryfów Śląski =

Town in Lower Silesian Voivodeship, Poland

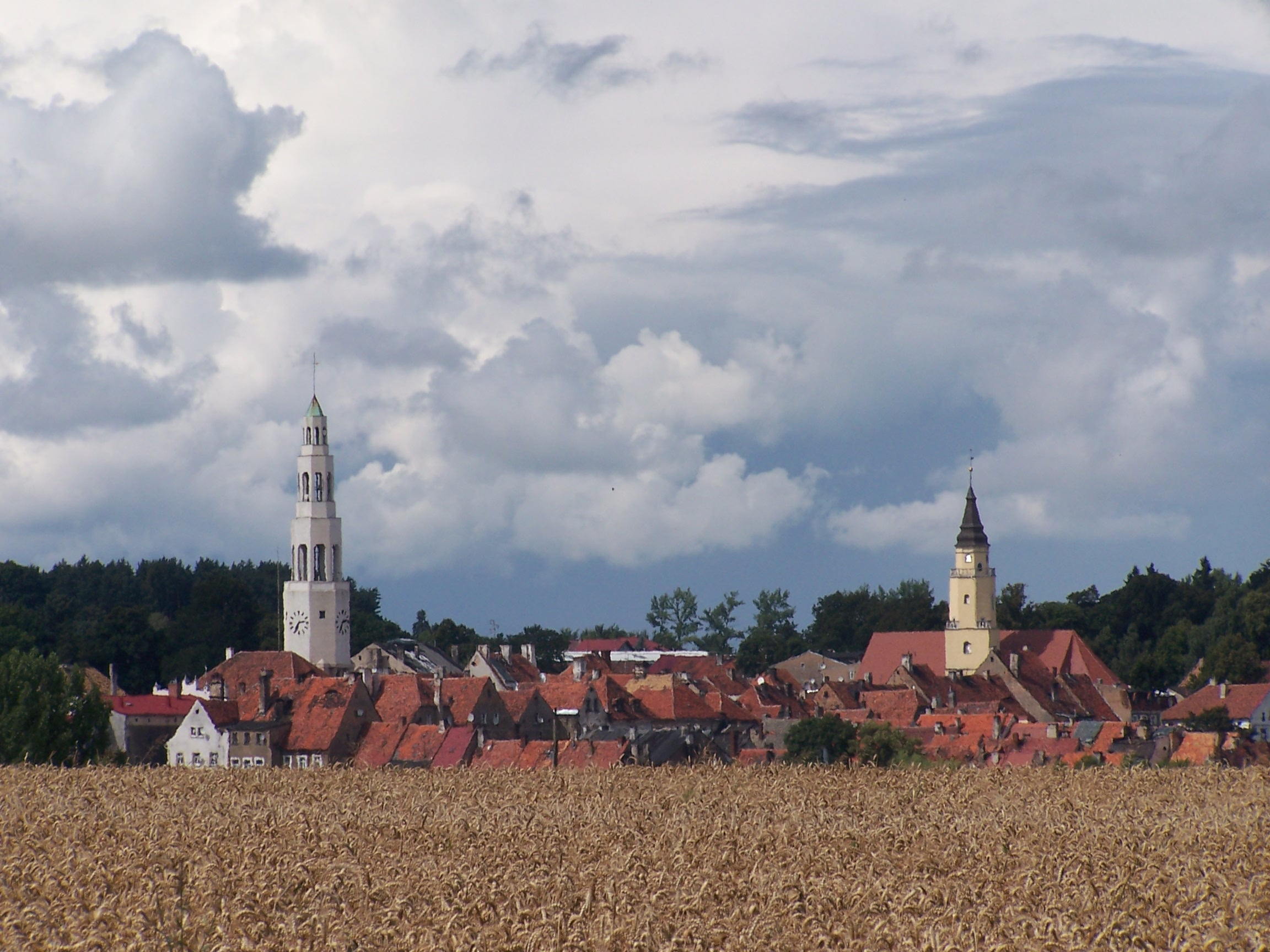

- Flag Coat of arms

- Location within Poland
- Coordinates: 51°1′38″N 15°25′9″E
- Country: Poland
- Voivodeship: Lower Silesian
- County: Lwówek
- Gmina: Gryfów Śląski
- Town rights: 1242

Government
  - Mayor: Olgierd Poniźnik

Area
  - Total: 6.63 km^{2} (2.56 sq mi)

Population (2019-06-30)
  - Total: 6,636
  - Density: 1,000/km^{2} (2,590/sq mi)
- Time zone: UTC+1 (CET)
  - Summer (DST): UTC+2 (CEST)
- Postal code: 59-620
- Area code: +48 75
- Vehicle registration: DLW
- Climate: Dfb
- Website: http://www.gryfow.pl

Gryfów Śląski ([ˈɡrɨfuf ˈɕlɔ̃skʲi]), often simplified to Gryfów (German: Greiffenberg) is a historic town in Lwówek County, Lower Silesian Voivodeship, in south-western Poland. It is the seat of the administrative district (gmina) called Gmina Gryfów Śląski. As of 2019, the town has a population of 6,636. The town is located between Zgorzelec and Jelenia Góra, on the Kwisa river.

== History ==
=== Medieval period ===
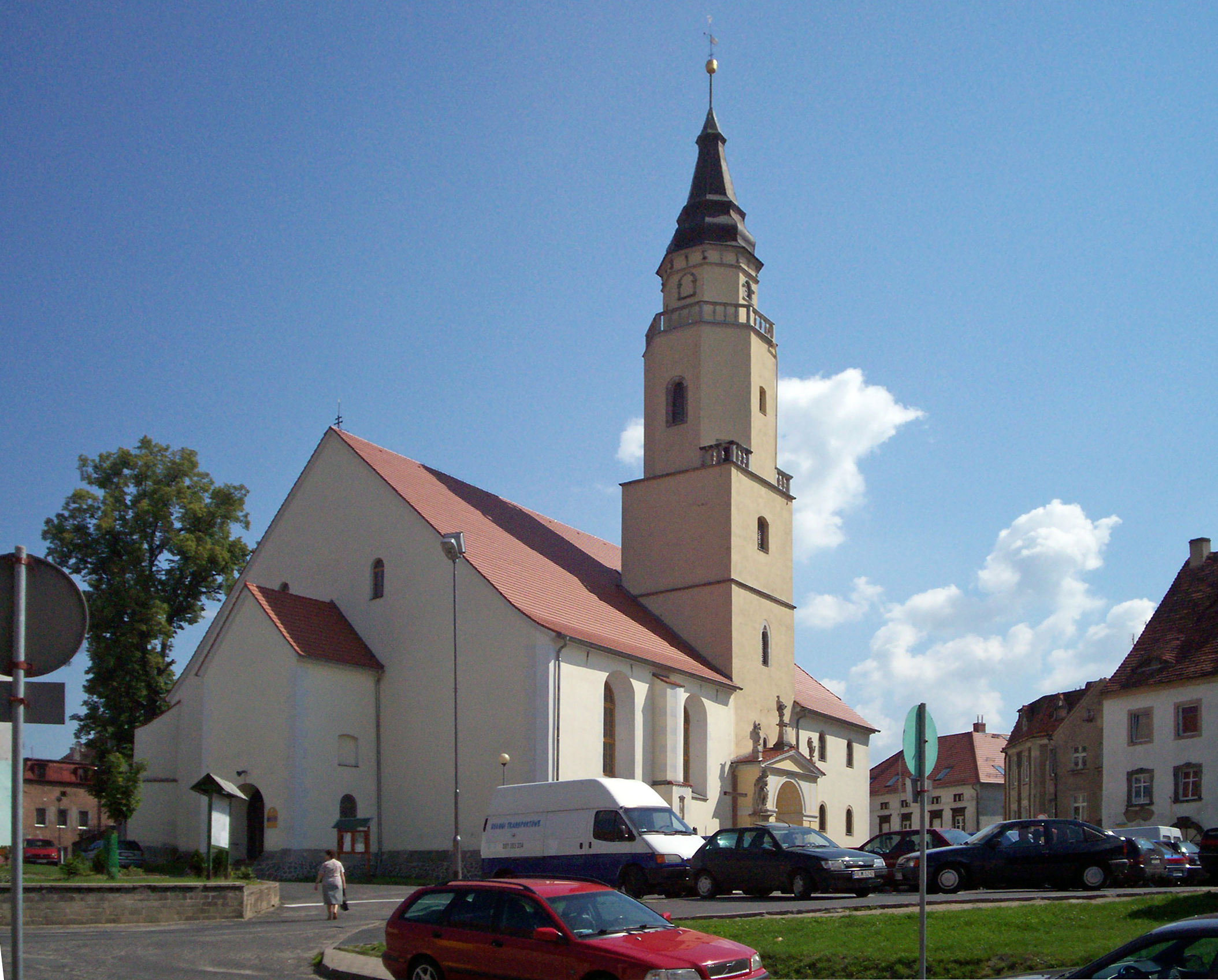
St Jadwiga Church

The town developed near the border with Upper Lusatia, although its precise origins remain uncertain. Tradition associates its foundation with the Piast Duke Bolesław I the Tall of Silesia and attributes the granting of town rights in 1242 to Duke Bolesław II the Bald. More recent research suggests that members of the Kamenz family, who originated from Upper Lusatia, may have founded the nearby Gryf Castle and the town around the middle of the 13th century. Greiffenberg was mentioned in a document from 1249, confirming its transfer to the newly established Duchy of Legnica, although whether it had already acquired town privileges at that time remains disputed. The most precise dating of the granting of town rights, as given by Professor Małgorzata Chorowska of the Wrocław University of Technology, is 1240–1280, confirmed by archaeological research carried out in 1991.

In 1274, Greiffenberg became part of the Duchy of Jawor, one of the Silesian duchies ruled by the Piast dynasty. The town was surrounded by defensive walls around 1300, which were expanded approximately a century later. Dukes Bolko I the Strict and Bolko II the Small fortified the town whilst remaining in alliance with King Władysław Łokietek, in an effort to resist the expansionist policies of the Kingdom of Bohemia. In 1354, Duke Bolko II the Small granted the town further privileges, including an annual fair and a weekly market, and confirmed rights based on those of neighbouring Lwówek Śląski. Following the death of Duke Bolko II the Small in 1368, the duchy passed by inheritance to the Bohemian Crown, although his widow Agnes retained control until her death in 1392. Afterwards, it passed to the Bohemian Crown, and thus became part of the Holy Roman Empire.

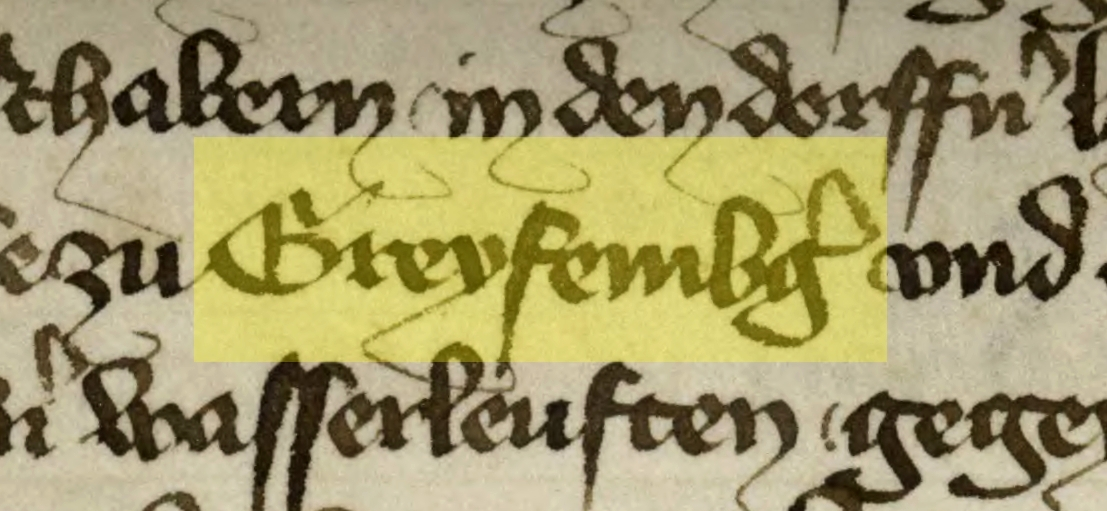
Mention of "Greyfembg", an early form of the German name Greiffenberg, in a 1384 document issued by King Wenceslaus IV of Bohemia

The ruins of the medieval Gryf Castle, situated south of the town, are still visible. The castle was pledged to Gotsche Schoff II in 1400 and became the property of the Schaffgotsch family in 1418, remaining in their possession until the end of the Second World War. During the Hussite Wars, between 1427 and 1431, a rebellion by the poor against the patricians took place.

=== Modern period ===
Floods hit the city in 1469, 1550 and 1609, droughts in 1472, 1590 and 1616, and epidemics in 1582, 1585 and 1633. In 1589 the town's first pharmacy was founded. In 1617 the first big fair took place. During the Thirty Years' War, the town was plundered twice by the Swedes, in 1639 and 1645. After the First Silesian War it was annexed by Prussia in 1742. During the Seven Years' War the town was plundered by Austrian troops. There were textile workers' uprisings, which were brutally suppressed by the Prussian army.

In 1865 the Greiffenberg station opened on the Silesian Mountain Railway line from Görlitz to Reibnitz (Rybnica). As part of Prussia, the town became part of the German Empire in 1871.

=== World War II and post-war period ===
During World War II, Germany established and operated a forced labour subcamp of the Stalag VIII-A prisoner-of-war camp in the town. On 12 February 1945, the Nazi authorities ordered the evacuation of the inhabitants. Mothers with young children were transported by a special train towards Dresden. The Red Army captured the town on 8 May 1945. On 15 May 1945, on Russian orders, all men aged between 17 and 50 were rounded up to be marched out of the town.

The Red Army occupied Greiffenberg on 8 May 1945. Following Germany's defeat in World War II, the town came under Polish administration. A Polish administrative office was established in May 1945, initially operating as the Office of the Polish Government Plenipotentiary. The Polish district administration was established in nearby Lwówek Śląski later that month. The town's German name, Greiffenberg, was subsequently replaced by the Polish names Gryfogóra and Gryfiogóra, before the present name Gryfów Śląski was adopted.

The town's German population was expelled. According to the municipal chronicle, the Polish militia carried out an expulsion of residents on 11 July 1945, followed by another expulsion two days later. Some inhabitants subsequently returned. On 13 July 1946, a large-scale expulsion took place, with residents forced to march to Lwówek Śląski before being transported by train to Allied-occupied Germany. A further wave of expulsions followed on 5 December 1946.

The Polish anti-communist resistance was active in the town and its environs in the following years.

Gryfów Śląski was administratively located in the Wrocław Voivodeship until 1974, and then the Jelenia Góra Voivodeship from 1975 to 1998. In 1980, local branches of the Independent Self-governing Trade Union "Solidarity" were established in the town.

The town was flooded during the 2024 Central European floods.

== Transport ==
The town is served by Gryfów Śląski railway station, which is served by regional Lower Silesian Railways trains.

== Sights ==
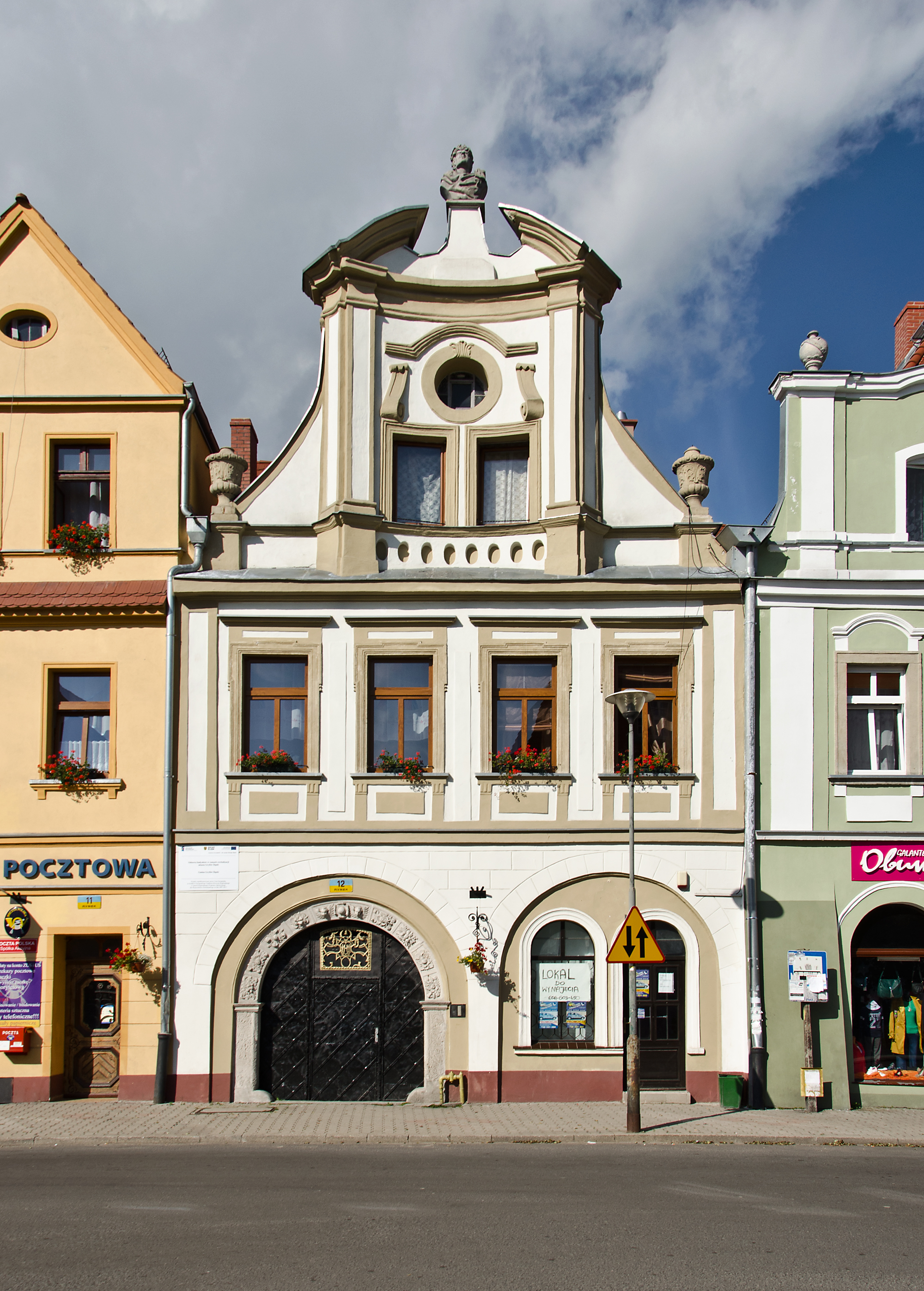
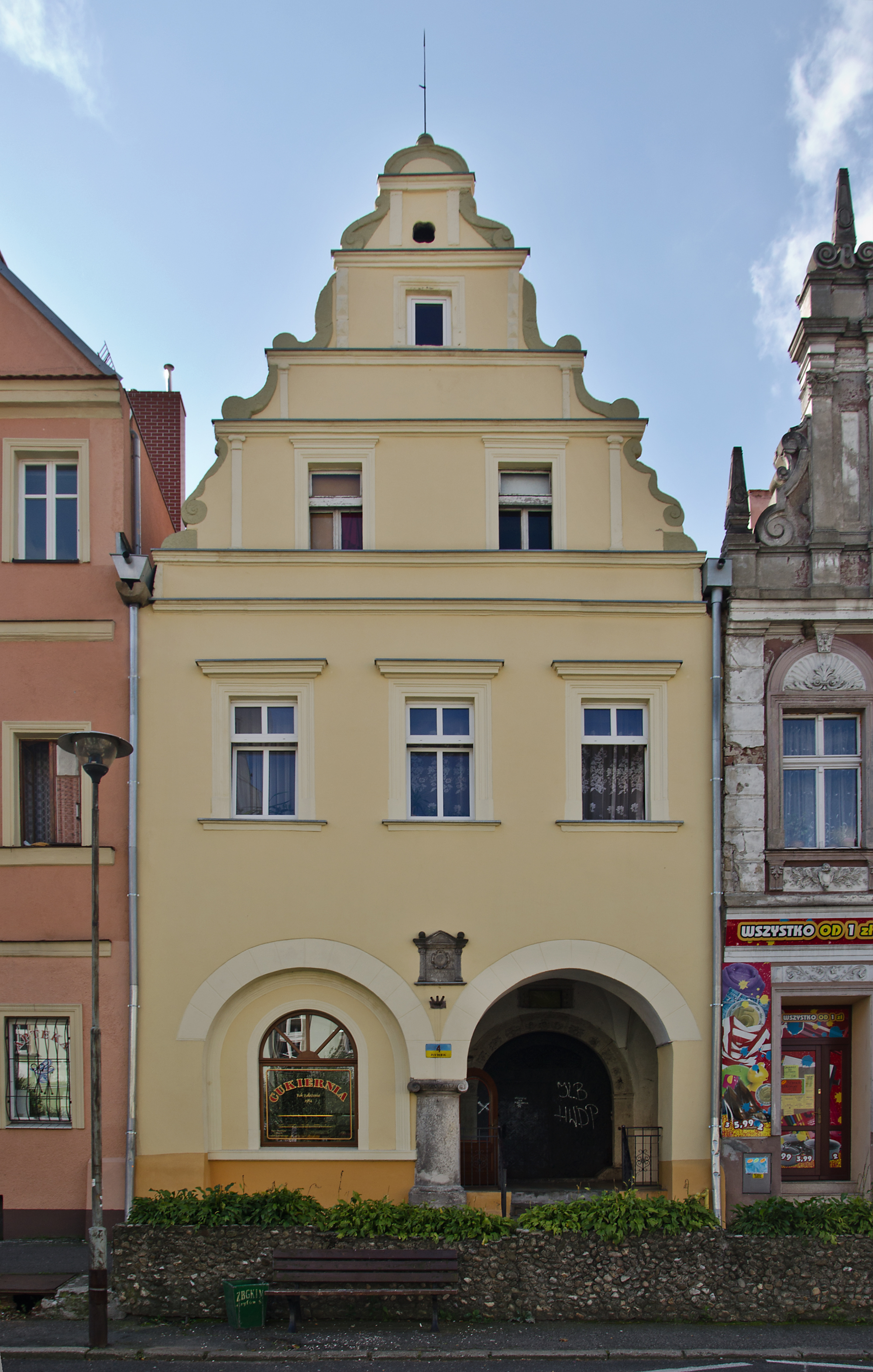
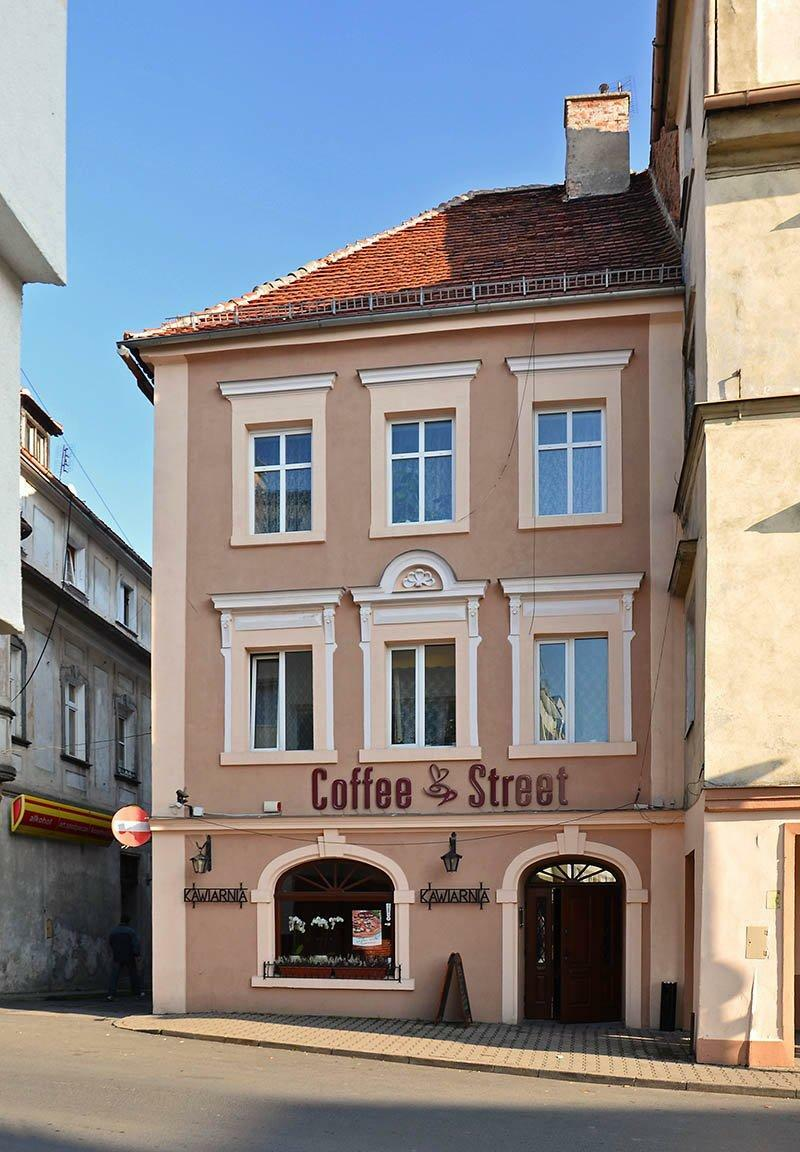
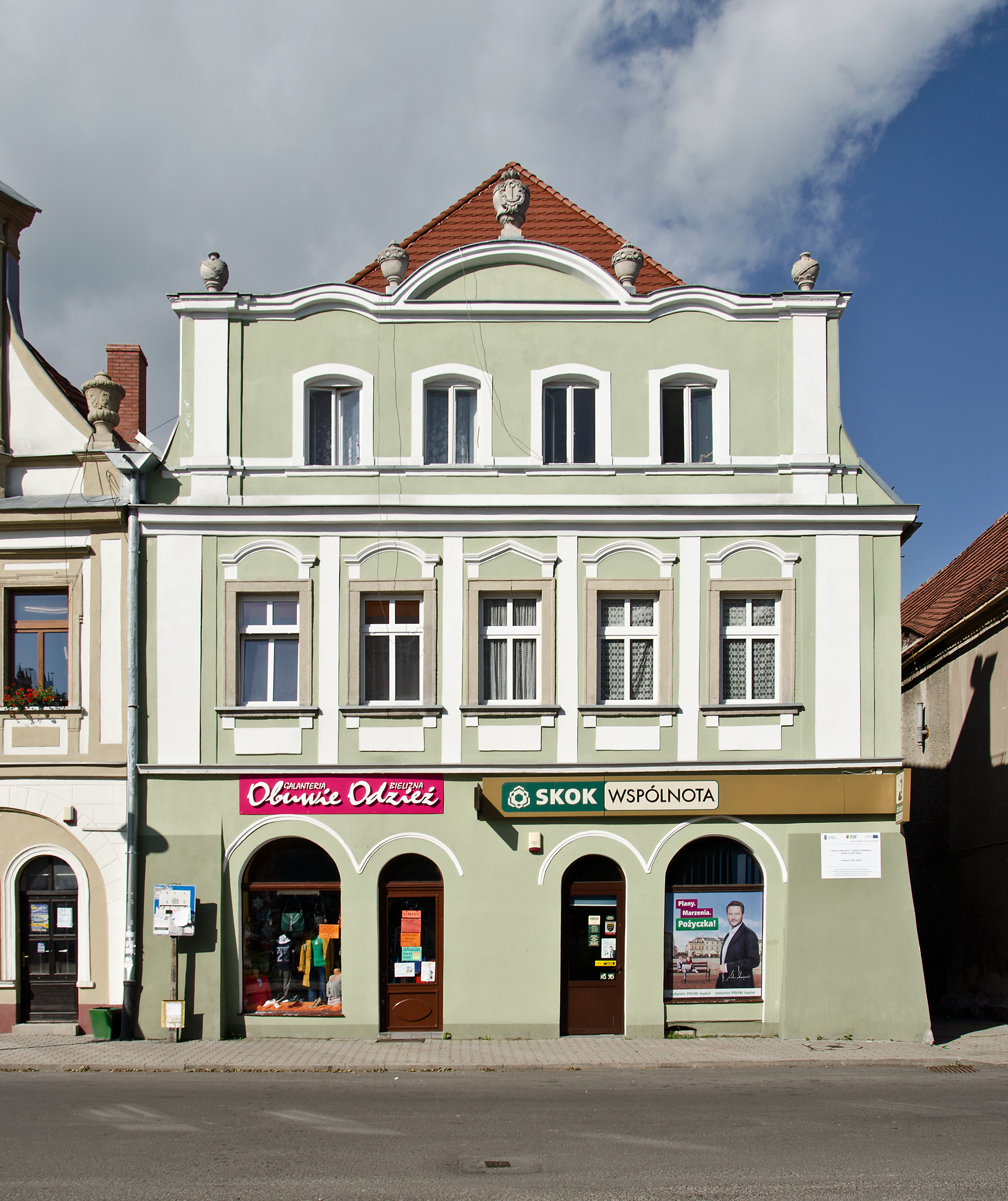
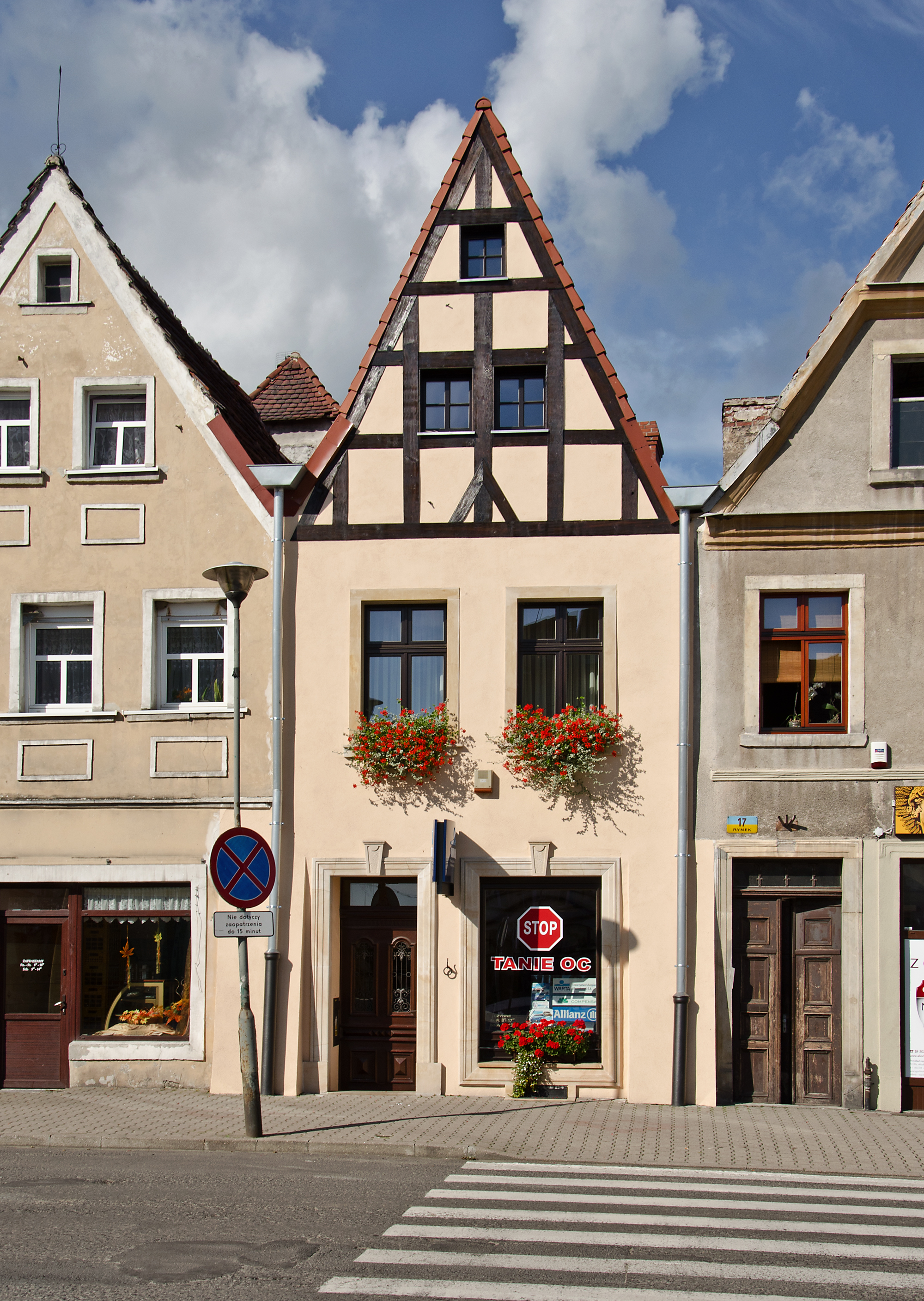
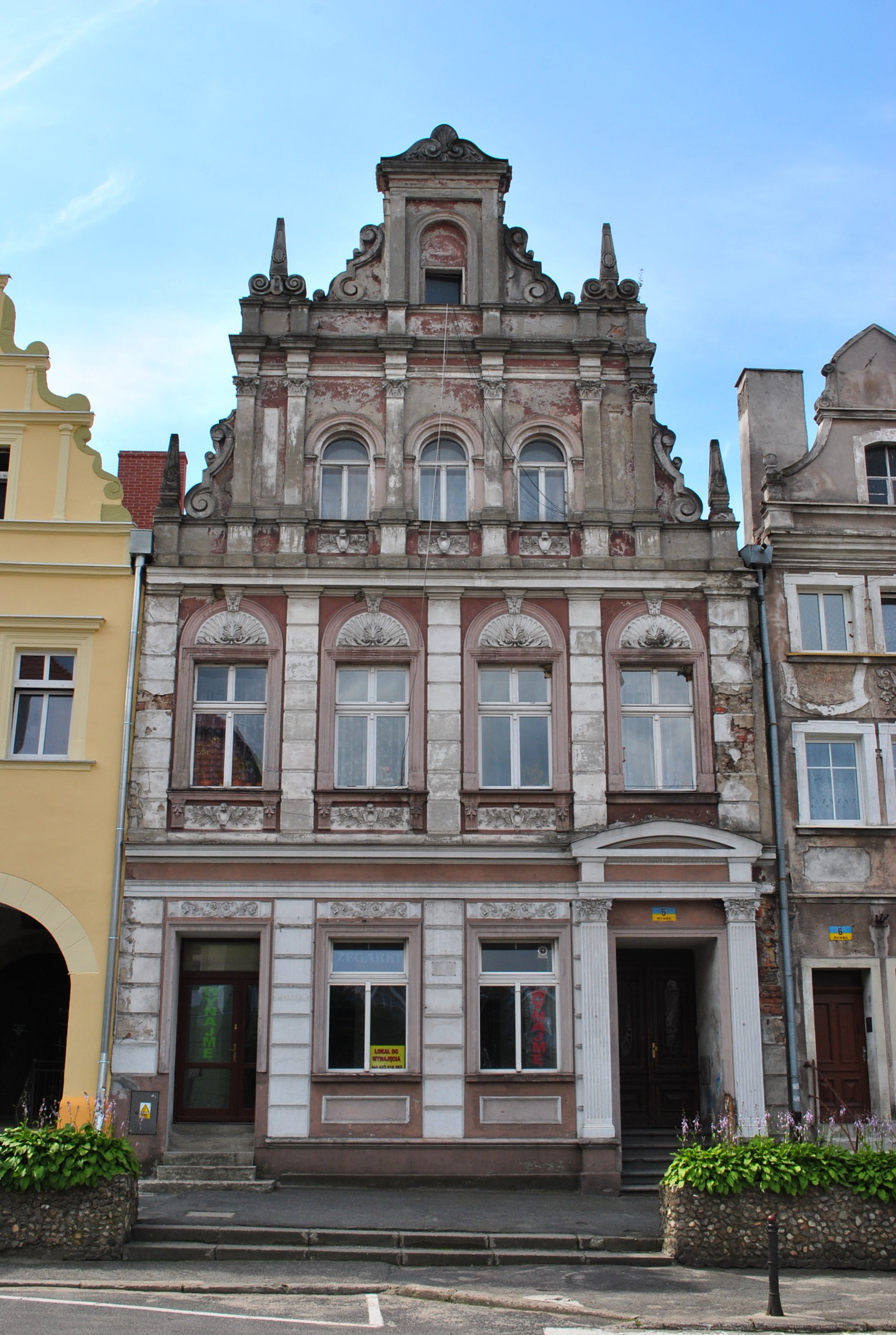
Historic townhouses (examples)

The historic sights of Gryfów Śląski include:

- the St. Jadwiga Church, dating back to the 15th century
- the town hall, built in the Renaissance style in the 16th century, later rebuilt
- the Market Square (Rynek) filled with historic townhouses, dating back to the 15th-19th centuries,
- medieval town walls
- the Saint Lawrence church, dating back to the 16th century

== Notable people ==
- Hans Ulrich von Schaffgotsch (1595-1635), Silesian general
- Hermann Steudner (1832–1863), Africa explorer
- Curt Joël (1865–1945), German politician
- Andrzej Chyra (born 1964), Polish actor

== Twin towns – sister cities ==
See twin towns of Gmina Gryfów Śląski.
