= Lower Silesian Road and Railway Authority =

Polish road and rail manager

Lower Silesian Road and Railway Authority in Wrocław

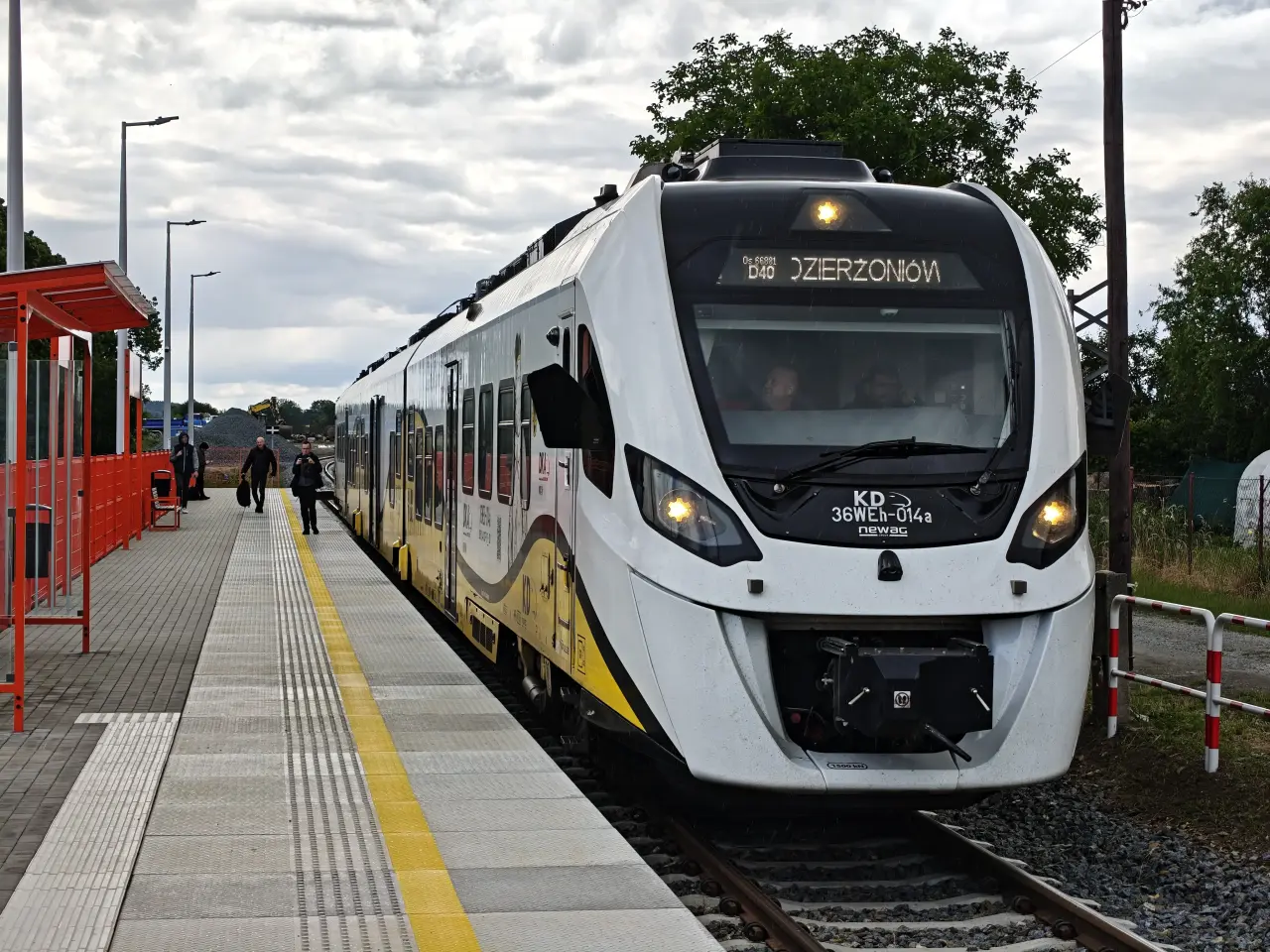
- Bielawa Góry Sowie railway station was opened on 14 June 2026 when its line was revitalised after it had been taken over by DSDiK.
- Native name: Dolnośląska Służba Dróg i Kolei we Wrocławiu
- Industry: Highway authority; Railway infrastructure manager
- Founded: 30 October 2007; 18 years ago
- Headquarters: Wrocław, Poland
- Area served: Lower Silesian Voivodeship
- Key people: Mateusz Masłowski (director)
- Products: road transport; rail transport
- Owner: Lower Silesian Voivodeship
- Website: dsdik.wroc.pl

The Lower Silesian Road and Railway Authority (Note: (Polish: Dolnośląska Służba Dróg i Kolei), also known as the Lower Silesian Road and Railway Authority in Wrocław (Polish: Dolnośląska Służba Dróg i Kolei we Wrocławiu).) (DSDiK) is a highway authority and railway infrastructure manager in the Lower Silesian Voivodeship of southwestern Poland. It serves as the regional-level counterpart of the General Directorate for National Roads and Motorways and PKP Polish Railway Lines.

== History ==
DSDiK was established on 30 October 2007.

== List of owned and managed infrastructure ==
=== Roads ===
As of August 2026, the following voivodeship roads are owned and managed by the Lower Silesian Road and Railway Authority:

Number	Start – end places
292	Nowa Sól – Lisowice
296	Kożuchów – Lubań
297	Nowa Sól – Pasiecznik
305	Bolewice – Wschowa
319	Stare Strącze – Serby
320	Legnica – Lubawka
321	Przyborów – Grodziec Mały
323	Leszno – Lubin
324	Szlichtyngowa – Rawicz
328	Nowe Miasteczko – Marciszów
329	Głogów – Potoczek
331	Chocianów – Polkowice
332	Sieniawka – Kopaczów
333	Nowa Sól – Legnica
334	Ciechanów – Moczydlnica Dworska
335	Chojnów – Lubin
336	Piechowice – Piechowice
337	Jelenia Góra – Jelenia Góra
338	Wińsko – Kawice
339	Żmigród – Wołów
340	Ścinawa – Oleśnica
341	Radecz – Brzeg Dolny
342	Oborniki Śląskie – Wrocław
345	Wilczków – Strzegom
346	Środa Śląska – Godzikowice
347	Kąty Wrocławskie – Wrocław
350	Łęknica – Bolesławiec
351	Jagodzin – Jędrzychowice
352	Zgorzelec – Sieniawka
353	Pieńsk – Strzelno
355	Koźmin – Zawidów
357	Radomierzyce – Brzeźnik
358	Włosień – Szklarska Poręba
359	Żmigródek – Wrocław
360	Gryfów Śląski – Świecie
361	Krzewie Wielkie – Szklarska Poręba
364	Gryfów Śląski – Legnica
365	Jelenia Góra – Piotrowice
367	Jelenia Góra – Wałbrzych
370	Rozdroże Kowarskie – Okraj
371	Mostowice – Mostowice
372	Wrocław – Radomierzyce
374	Stanowice – Świebodzice
375	Dobromierz – Szczawno-Zdrój
376	Szczawno-Zdrój – Czarny Bór
378	Biedrzychów – Grodków
379	Wałbrzych – Świdnica
380	Wałbrzych – Wałbrzych
381	Wałbrzych – Kłodzko
382	Bolesławiec – Paczków
382a	Jawor – Jawor
383	Jedlina-Zdrój – Dzierżoniów
384	Nowa Ruda – Łagiewniki
385	Wolibórz – Jaczowice
386	Tłumaczów – Gorzuchów
387	Ścinawka Średnia – Kudowa-Zdrój
388	Ratno Dolne – Bystrzyca Kłodzka
389	Zielone – Międzylesie
390	Kamieniec Ząbkowicki – Lądek-Zdrój
392	Żelazno – Bystrzyca Kłodzka
393	Lubań – Leśna
395	Wrocław – Strzelin
396	Oleśnica – Ząbkowice Śląskie
401	Żłobizna – Pakosławice
403	Łukowice Brzeskie – Kłosów
439	Żmigródek – Syców
449	Syców – Błaszki
451	Bierutów – Namysłów
455	Wrocław – Oława

=== Railways ===
The following railway lines are owned and managed by the Lower Silesian Road and Railway Authority, combined at a total length of 99.208 km (61.645 mi):

Line	Section in km		Section by stations
Line	Start	End	Section by stations
Legnica–Jerzmanice-Zdrój	24.444	48.175	Jerzmanice Zdrój–Lwówek Śląski
Szczawno Zdrój–Sobięcin	3.400	17.140	Szczawno Zdrój–Sobięcin
Strzegom–Marciszów	41.595	73.040	Strzegom–Marciszów
Chocianów–Przemków	6.900	28.720	Chocianowiec–Przemków
Chocianów–Przemków	28.720	31.100	Przemków Odlewnia–Voivodeship border
Jelenia Góra–Mysłakowice	30.060	37.858	Jelenia Góra–Mysłakowice
Pisarzowice–Mysłakowice	5.464	30.060	Pisarzowice–Mysłakowice
Kobierzyce–Piława Górna	0.174	33.430	Kobierzyce–Piława Górna
Jelenia Góra–Harrachov	29.844	43.138	Szklarska Poręba Górna–Czech Republic–Poland border
Chojnów–Rokitki	21.832	27.900	Chojnów–Rokitki
Gryfów Śląski–Świeradów-Zdrój	0.668	16.544	Gryfów Śląski–Świeradów Zdrój
Bielawa–Dzierżoniów Śląski	24.300	28.155	Bielawa Góry Sowie–Bielawa Zachodnia
Bielawa–Srebrna Góra	12.380	24.300	Srebrna Góra–Bielawa Góry Sowie
Strzelin–Łagiewniki	33.763	51.139	Strzelin–Łagiewniki
Henryków–Ciepłowody	9.982	13.282	Ciepłowody–Ciepłowody
Nowa Wieś Grodziska	0.303	2.065	Nowa Wieś Grodziska–Nowa Wieś Grodziska
Wrocław–Trzebnica	1.260	19.903	Wrocław Zakrzów–Trzebnica
Ścinawka Średnia–Radków	5.975	14.581	Ścinawka Średnia–Radków
Wolibórz–Słupiec	-5.380	0.000	Wolibórz–Słupiec
Roztoka	13.332	14.638	Roztoka–Roztoka
Henryków–Ciepłowody	-0.279	9.982	Henryków–Ciepłowody
Mysłakowice–Karpacz	0.316	7.052	Mysłakowice–Karpacz
Bielawa–Dzierżoniów	0.000	5.118	Bielawa Zachodnia–Dzierżoniów Śląski
Kamienna Góra–Pisarzowice	1.780	5.464	Kamienna Góra–Pisarzowice
Bojanowo–Góra Śląska	0.600	15.305	Bojanowo–Góra Śląska

== See also ==
- Acquisition of railways by the Lower Silesian Voivodeship
- Lower Silesian Railways
