= Serby =

Serby may refer to:

== People ==
- Clay Serby (born 1950), Canadian provincial politician
- Steve Serby, American sports reporter

== Places in Poland ==
- Serby, Lower Silesian Voivodeship, a village
- Stare Serby, a village of the Lower Silesian Voivodeship

== Places in Ukraine ==
- Serby, Podilsk, a village near Kodyma, Podilsk Raion, Odesa Oblast
