= Zabornia =

Zabornia may refer to the following places in Poland:

- Zabornia in Gmina Głogów, Głogów County in Lower Silesian Voivodeship (SW Poland)
- Zabornia (Cieszków), a settlement in Cieszków, Milicz County, in Lower Silesian Voivodeship
- Zabornia (Piaski), a settlement in Gmina Piaski, Greater Poland Voivodeship
- Zabornia (Gdańsk), a neighborhood in Gdańsk
- Zabornia (Rabka-Zdrój), part of Rabka-Zdrój
