= Wałbrzych Special Economic Zone =

The Wałbrzych Special Economic Zone "INVEST-PARK"
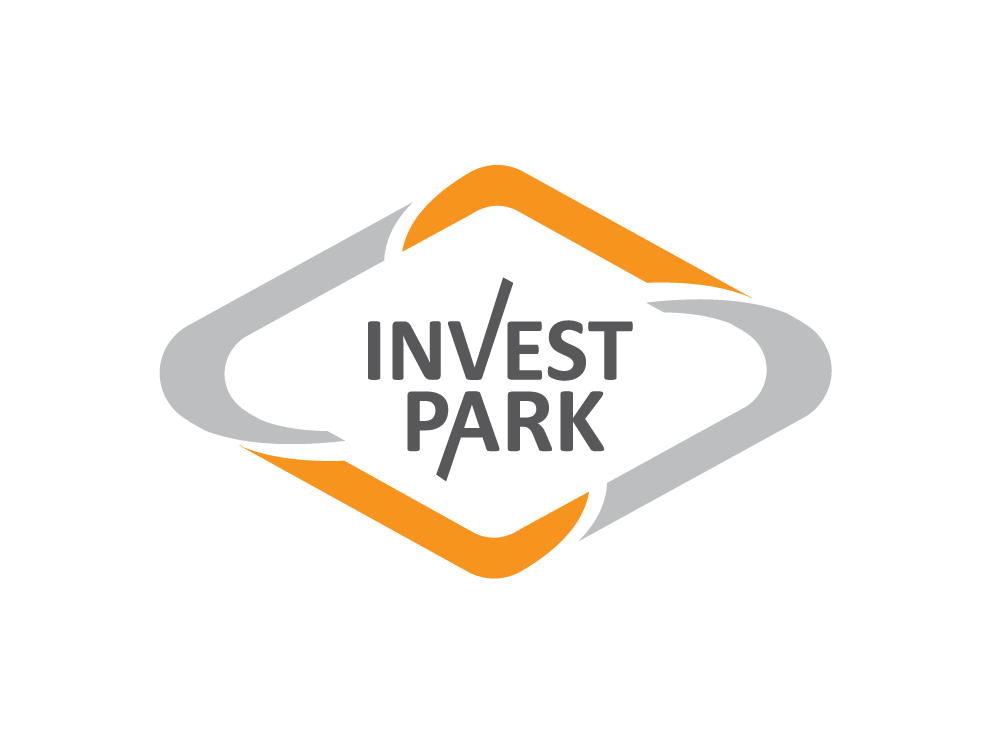
- Founded: 1997
- Headquarters: ul. Uczniowska 21 58-306 Wałbrzych, Poland
- Number of locations: 41 subzones in 4 Voivodeships (Lower Silesia, Opolskie, Wielkopolskie, Lubuskie)
- Area served: International
- Key people: Barbara Kaśnikowska

The Wałbrzych Special Economic Zone "INVEST - PARK" has been established based on the Ordinance by the Polish Council of Ministers dated 15 April 1997 and will operate until December 31, 2020. It is situated in south-west Poland in Dolnoslaskie, Opolskie, Wielkopolskie and Lubuskie Voivodeship. The WSEZ "INVEST-PARK" consists of 41 subzones located mainly in Lower Silesia Province, as well as Wielkopolskie, Opolskie and Lubuskie provinces. The total area of the WSEZ "INVEST-PARK" is 2,212.23 hectares (22.1223 km^{2}).

== History ==
The Wałbrzych Special Economic Zone "INVEST - PARK is situated in south-west Poland in Dolnoslaskie, Opolskie, Wielkopolskie and Lubuskie Voivodeship.

The region where the Zone has been established, for hundred years was connected with the textile and mining industries. The region had also rich industrial traditions in such fields like machinery, electricity, ceramic, mechanical engineering, plastic processing and electrical engineering. Liquidation of the coal mines that started at beginning of the 1990s had a negative influence on the state of cooperating plants, including the mechanical, electrical engineering and others supplying needs of mining. It resulted in a rapid increase in unemployment. Immediately, the precaution actions have been taken to change this situation and restructure the existing plants. One of those solutions, aiming to improve economic growth of the region was establishing of the Wałbrzych Special Economic Zone. At the beginning, it occupied space of 255 hectares (630 acres), located within four subzones: Wałbrzych, Dzierżoniów, Nowa Ruda and Kłodzko.

The administration of the zone has been entrusted the Wałbrzych Special Economic Zone "INVEST - PARK" limited company with its head office in Wałbrzych. Its main shareholders are: the Treasury of State which has a decisive number of votes, communes where there are subzones, financing institutions - banks and Authority Agencies, including Agency of Industry Development S.A. The task of the Company is, first of all, to run a promotion of investment within the zone and to develop the zone by means of administration with property, development of infrastructure and full qualified service of the investors. The managing Company has got rights given by Minister of Economy to run bids and negotiations for sale of lands and the right of giving permissions for running a business within the zone.

Due to dynamic development of the Zone and high land usage ratio of areas within the Zone (including fully occupancy of areas in several Subzones) by the end of year 2000 areas of the WSEZ systematically were enlarged and new Subzones were established. Starting from year 2004 new regulations entered into force enabling establishing of a Subzone of the WSEZ for new area, so far not included in the special economic zone. The condition to establish new Subzone was realization of a new investment of value at least 40 million Euro or creation of at least 500 new work places. Among others following companies took advantage of the new regulation: Electrolux, IBM, Wabco, Colgate-Palmolive and Cadbury. Next, redletter year for WSEZ "INVEST-PARK" was 2006, when areas located within the Zone were developed in over 85%. According to the amendments, the zone gained nearly 500 ha of additional grounds at the beginning of 2007.

== Zone in figures ==
Changes within the area of the Wałbrzych Special Economic Zone "INVEST-PARK" in years 1997-2010 (expressed in ha)

Investment expenditures in the Wałbrzych Special Economic Zone "INVEST-PARK" in years 1997–2009 (expressed in PLN billion)

Number of expenditures who decided to invest within the WSEZ in years 2004–2010

The most popular sub-zone of the WSEZ in 2017
(number of interactions on the website http://mapa.invest-park.com.pl Archived 2016-05-23 at the Wayback Machine )

== At present ==
At present the Wałbrzych Special Economic Zone is composed of 41 Subzones, of which 25 are situated within the Dolnośląskie Voivodship, i.e. Wałbrzych, Nowa Ruda, Kłodzko, Dzierżoniow, Żarow, Jelcz - Laskowice, Kudowa Zdrój, Świdnica, Wrocław, Oława, Strzelin, Strzegom, Brzeg Dolny, Bolesławiec, Wiązów, Wołów, Ząbkowice Śląskie, Syców, Świebodzice, Bielawa, Bystrzyca Kłodzka, Twardogóra, Góra and Oleśnica seven other areas are located in Opolskie Voivodship – i.e. Opole, Nysa, Namysłów, Praszka, Kluczbork, Skarbimierz and Prudnik, eight in Wielkopolskie Voivodship - i.e. Krotoszyn, Śrem, Września, Leszno, Kościań, Rawicz, Jarocin and Kalisz, and one in Lubuskie Voivodship - i.e. Szprotawa. The WSEZ in total encompass space of about 2212,23 ha.

Main strong points of the Zone are possible allowances against taxes for the investors and other encouragement. Investing in the Wałbrzych Special Economic Zone entrepreneur can get a public assistance amounting of up to 40% (in Dolnośląkie and Wielkopolskie Voivodship) or up to 50% (in Opolskie and Lubuskie Voivodship) of incurred investment costs or two-year labour cost of new employed workers. The economic assistance for small-sized investors (excluding road transport business) is increased by 20% and in case of medium-sized investors is increased by 10% All subzones have a modern technical infrastructure. They are situated in a geographically convenient location in relation to capital of Lower Silesia – Wrocław and close to the borders of Czech Republic and Germany. This is an additional strong point for investments within the Zone. The attractiveness of the zone is increased by well-developed transport network – road and railway systems and existing and reconstructed highway A4 and expressway S8. The international airport situated in Wrocław makes possible fast both domestic and foreign air connection.

Very important factor from an investment effectiveness point of view is the fact that labour costs in the region are lower than in other European countries, and also relatively lower than in other regions of Poland.

Attractive conditions for investment within the zone in connection with existing labour market, the economic potential of the region and favourable location shall guarantee the dynamics of development expected by the investors. Businessmen investing in the zone may look forward to a friendly attitude from the local authorities and to qualified assistance from the company managing the Zone.

== Subject activities ==
The task of the Company is, first of all, to run a promotion of investment within the zone and to develop the zone by means of administration with property, development of infrastructure and fully qualified service of the investors. The managing Company has got rights given by Minister of Economy to run bids and negotiations for sale of lands and the right of giving permissions for running a business within the zone.

== Location ==
The Wałbrzych Special Economic Zone "INVEST-PARK" is in Poland. The areas of the Wałbrzych Special Economic Zone "INVEST-PARK" are situated in the southwestern part of Poland, in the centre of Europe in very close vicinity of the Czech Republic and Germany, what is its undeniable advantage.

== Subzones Wałbrzych Special Economic Zone ==
- Lower Silesia Voivodeship
  - Bolesławiec
  - Bielawa
  - Brzeg Dolny
  - Dzierżoniów
  - Jelcz-Laskowice
  - Kłodzko
  - Kudowa-Zdrój
  - Nowa Ruda
  - Oława
  - Piława Górna
  - Strzegom
  - Strzelin
  - Syców
  - Świdnica
  - Wałbrzych
  - Wiązów
  - Wołów
  - Wrocław
  - Ząbkowice Śląskie
  - Żarów
  - Twardogóra
  - Góra
  - Oleśnica
  - Świebodzice
  - Bystrzyca Kłodzka
- Lubusz Voivodeship
  - Szprotawa
- Opole Voivodeship
  - Kluczbork
  - Namysłów
  - Nysa
  - Opole
  - Praszka
  - Prudnik
  - Skarbimierz
- Greater Poland Voivodeship
  - Kalisz
  - Krotoszyn
  - Śrem
  - Września
  - Leszno
  - Jarocin
  - Kalisz
  - Rawicz

== Public aid ==
The Wałbrzych Special Economic Zone "INVEST-PARK" was established based on the Ordinance by the Council of Ministers dated 15 April 1997 until 2020. During that time, entrepreneurs investing within the area of the WSEZ can obtain public aid based on new investment costs or based on the creation of new workplaces, related to a given investment, in the form of an income tax exemption.

The lands included in the Wałbrzych Special Economic Zone are owned by the WSEZ or communes - shareholders of the company, have clear legal status (free from encumbrances) and according to spatial development plans they are industrial areas. The lands are administrated by the WSEZ "INVEST-PARK" sp. z o.o. which conducts procedure for issuing of a permit for conducting business activity within the Zone and for sale of a real estate. All procedures related to purchase of plots for construction and receiving of a permit for conducting business activity within the Zone, which grants the right to receive public aid, are conducted at one place.

Good developed road and railways networks, as well as the international airport in Wroclaw plus close distance to borders with Czech Republic and Germany, is favorable for establishing cooperation and business contacts.

In the case of the entrepreneurs taking advantage of the public aid connected with costs of new investment, among these costs are included costs for:

- grounds or their perpetual usufruct purchasing price,

- purchasing price or cost for creation within one's capacity fixed assets on the condition that they are included, according to the regulations, into the taxpayer's property (the fixed assets purchased by an entrepreneur other than small or medium, should be new),

- costs of extension or modernization of existing fixed assets,

- purchasing price of intangible assets, related to transfer of technology by purchasing patent rights, licences, know-how, or unpatented technology knowledge, but in the case of other than small and medium entrepreneurs, the investment's costs are considered in the costs which qualify to be covered by the aid in the amount that is not higher than 50% of value of the costs qualify to be covered by aid.

The costs related to the purchasing of assets covered by renting or tenancy other than ground, buildings and structures are taken into consideration only when renting or tenancy is in finance leasing form and includes liability of purchasing the assets when the period of renting or tenancy is over. Regarding the renting or tenancy of ground, buildings and structures, the renting or tenancy must last for the period of at least 5 years from the scheduled period of termination of the investment project, and in the case of small and medium entrepreneurs – at least 3 years.

In case the entrepreneur benefits from public aid based on new investment's costs, he can obtain public aid up to 40% of investment costs qualified for inclusion in the public aid in Lower Silesia and Wielkopolskie Voivodeship and 50% of investment costs qualified for inclusion in the public aid in Opolskie and Lubuskie Voivodeship. However, the entrepreneur is not allowed to transfer in any form the ownership of elements of the assets with which the investment expenditures were connected – for a 5 years period (3 years for small and medium-size entrepreneur) counting from the date of inputting into fixed assets register and intangible and legal assets, according to provisions on income tax, and the entrepreneur is obliged to conduct business activity for the time not shorter than 5 years (3 years for small and medium size entrepreneur). The minimum amount of investment costs which are described above amounts 100,000 Euro. Other condition, which must be fulfilled to apply for public aid based on new investment, is the share of entrepreneur's own funds (understood as founds, which were not received as a part of granted public aid), at the amount of at least 25% of the total cost of a new investment. A new investment means investment in fixed and intangible assets for creation or extension of an entity. Public subsidy for reconstruction investment is not allowed.

In case the entrepreneur benefits from public aid based on creation of new workplaces the public aid amounts up to 50% of two-year labour costs borne for new employed employees (including gross salaries increased by all obligatory payments related to employment of employees, borne by entrepreneur from the date, when the employees were employed) in case of Lubuskie and Opolskie Voivodeship and up to 40% in case of Lower Silesia and Wielkopolskie Voivodeship, however it is required to keep newly created workplaces at least for 5 years period (3 years for small and medium-size entrepreneur).

Newly employed employees mean the number of employees employed after the date of issuing the permit for conducting business activity within the area of the WSEZ regarding realization of new investment, but not later than in the period of 3 years after completion of the investment. The number of employees means all employees employed as full-time workers in a period of 1 year, altogether with part-time workers and seasonal workers but converted into full-time workplaces.

The public aid granted to the small-sized entrepreneur increases:

- from 40% up to 60% in Lower Silesia and Wielkopolskie Voivodeship,
- from 50% up to 70% in Opolskie and Lubuskie Voivodeship,

in case of medium-sized entrepreneur:

- from 40% up to 50% in Lower Silesia and Wielkopolskie Voivodeship,
- from 50% up to 60% in Opolskie and Lubuskie Voivodeship,

of investment costs borne or two-year labour costs of new employed employees.

A legal base to benefit from the public aid in a form of corporate income tax exemption is the permit for conducting business activity within the area of the Zone, mentioned in art. 16 item 1 of the Act on special economic zones (Journal of Laws Dz.U.94.123.600 amended).

In case of the small-sized entrepreneur the public aid cannot exceed:

- 60% in case of Lower Silesia and Wielkopolskie Voivodship
- 70% in case of Lubuskie and Opolskie Voivodship

In case of medium-sized entrepreneur the public aid cannot exceed:

- 50% in case of Lower Silesia and Wielkopolskie Voivodship
- 60% in case of Lubuskie and Opolskie Voivodship

of the value of investment costs borne or two – year labour costs of new employed employees.

In case of subsidy granted to the entrepreneur to realize a big investment project (for which qualifying for inclusion in the public aid exceed 50,000,000 Euros) its maximum amount is established according to the following formula:

I = R x (50,000,000 Euros + 0.5 x B + 0.34 x C)

where:

I – amount of aid of the big investment project

R – intensity of aid for the area of the investment location

B – amount of the investment costs qualifying for inclusion in the public aid scheme over

50,000,000 Euros and not exceeding 100,000,000 Euros

C – amount of the investment costs qualifying to obtain public aid exceeding 100,000,000 Euros.

TAX ALLOWANCES CALCULATOR

== Investors in the WSEZ ==
The Wałbrzych Special Economic Zone operates almost 160 businesses, among others:

- Toyota
- Cersanit
- Faurecia
- NSK
- General Electric
- Metzeler
- Henkel-Ceresit
- FagorMastercook
- Electrolux
- Bridgestone
- Colgate Palmolive
- Cadbury
- Marcegaglia
- IBM
- Mando Corporation
- BOSCH
- Ronal
- Mitsui High-tec

== Countries of origin of investors ==
- United States
- Japan
- Germany
- Sweden
- France
- Poland
- Spain
- Italy
- Switzerland
- Portugal
- Denmark
- The Netherlands
- Czech Republic
- Ireland
- South Korea
- United Kingdom
- United Arab Emirates

== Industries represented in the WSEZ ==
- automotive industry
- household appliances productions
- electrotechnical and electronic industries
- engineering industry
- metal processing
- construction industry
- plastic products production
- clothing sector

and others
