= Wilków =

Wilków may refer to:

- Wilków, Głogów County in Lower Silesian Voivodeship (south-west Poland)
- Wilków, Świdnica County in Lower Silesian Voivodeship (south-west Poland)
- Wilków, Złotoryja County in Lower Silesian Voivodeship (south-west Poland)
- Wilków, Hrubieszów County in Lublin Voivodeship (east Poland)
- Wilków, Gmina Wilków in Opole County, Lublin Voivodeship (east Poland)
- Wilków, Lesser Poland Voivodeship (south Poland)
- Wilków, Świętokrzyskie Voivodeship (south-central Poland)
- Wilków, Masovian Voivodeship (east-central Poland)
- Wilków, Silesian Voivodeship (south Poland)
- Wilków, Namysłów County in Opole Voivodeship (south-west Poland)
- Wilków, Prudnik County in Opole Voivodeship (south-west Poland)
- Wilków Wielki in Dzierżoniów County

== See also ==
- Wilkow (surname), people with this surname
