= Klucze =

Klucze may refer to the following places in Poland:

- Klucze, Lower Silesian Voivodeship (south-west Poland)
- Klucze, Lesser Poland Voivodeship (south Poland)
