= Bierzów =

Bierzów refers to the following places in Poland:

- Bierzów, Greater Poland Voivodeship
- Bierzów, Opole Voivodeship
