= Szczyglice, Lower Silesian Voivodeship =

Szczyglice
- Village
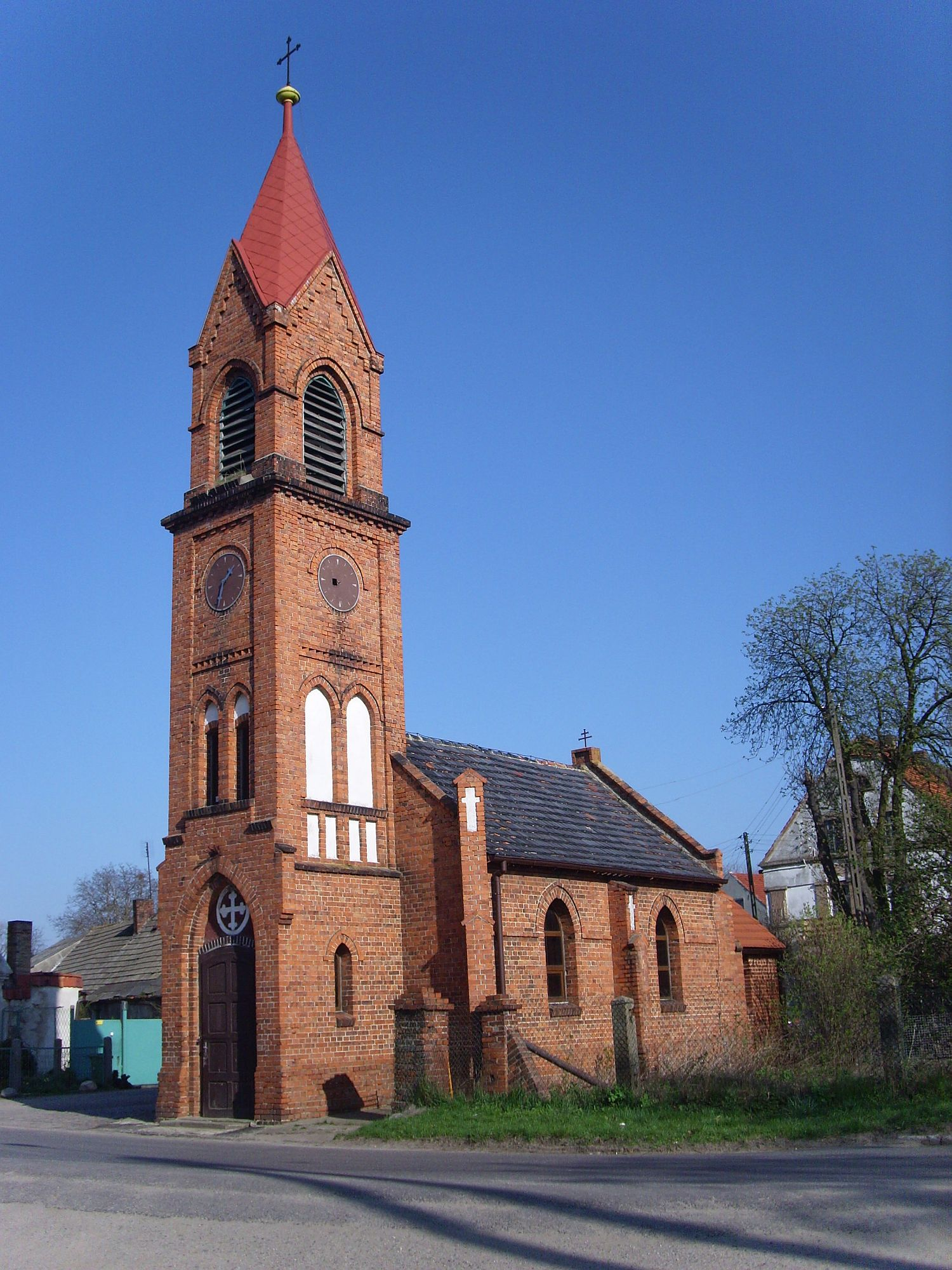
- Church of the Nativity of the Virgin Mary

- Location within Poland
- Coordinates: 51°38′N 16°08′E
- Country: Poland
- Voivodeship: Lower Silesian
- County: Głogów
- Gmina: Głogów
- Population: 100
- (approximate)

Szczyglice [ʂt͡ʂɨˈɡlit͡sɛ] is a village in the administrative district of Gmina Głogów, within Głogów County, Lower Silesian Voivodeship, in south-western Poland.
