= Skarbimierz-Osiedle =

Settlement in Silesia

- Osiedle
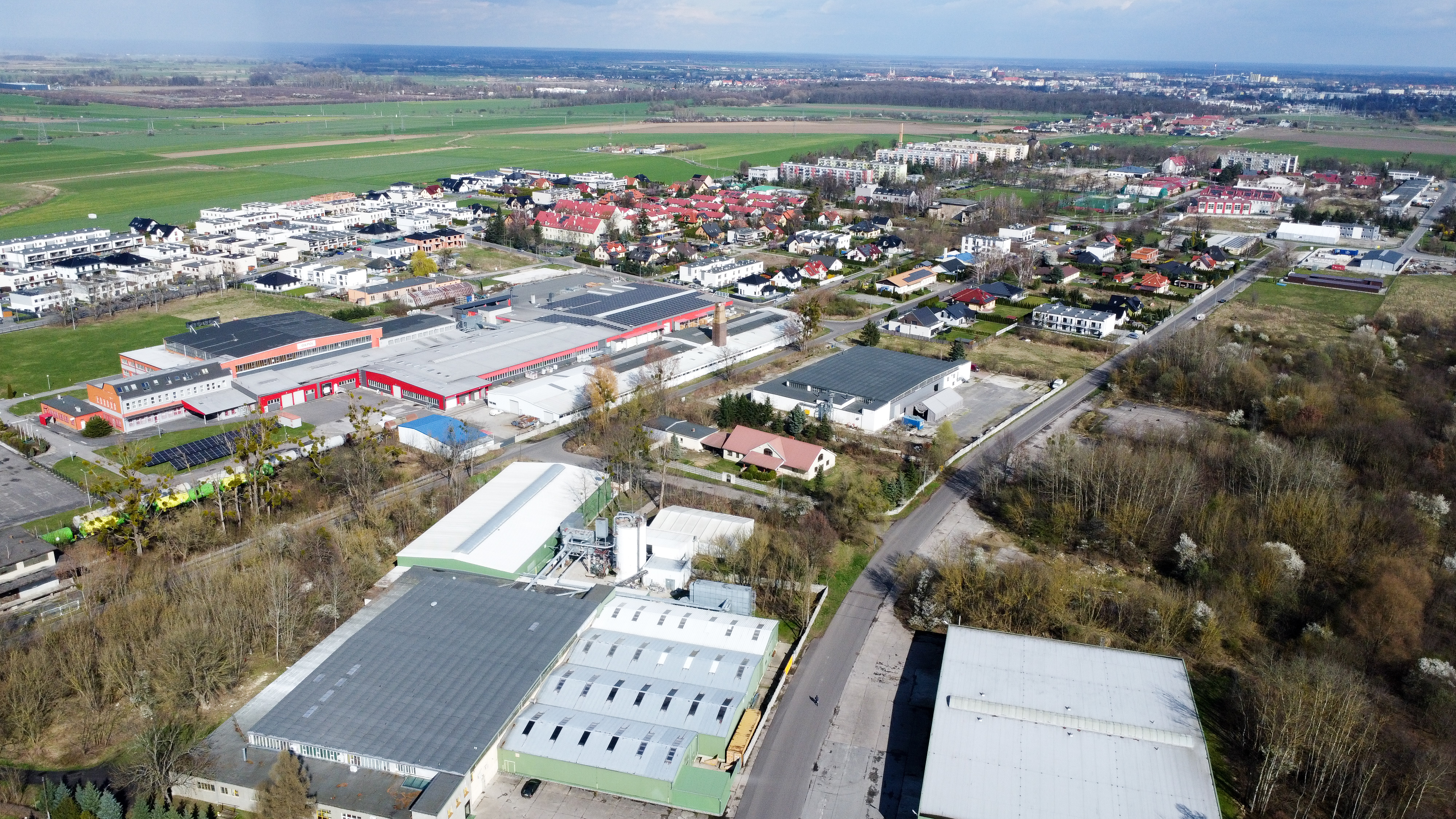

- Location within Poland
- Coordinates: 50°50′N 17°26′E
- Country: Poland
- Voivodeship: Opole
- County: Brzeg
- Gmina: Skarbimierz
- Population: 1,845

Skarbimierz-Osiedle [skarˈbimjɛʂ ɔˈɕɛdlɛ] is an osiedle in the administrative district of Gmina Skarbimierz, within Brzeg County, Opole Voivodeship, in south-western Poland.

An industrial park is located in the south of the district, as part of the Wałbrzych Special Economic Zone. It includes the following factories;

- Perfetti Van Melle - manufacturing chewing gum and other confectionery
- Mondelez International - manufacturing chocolate and other confectionery
- Donaldson Company - motor vehicle parts
- Mitsui High-tec - electrical steel sheet processing
