= Skarbimierz, Opole Voivodeship =

Skarbimierz
- Village
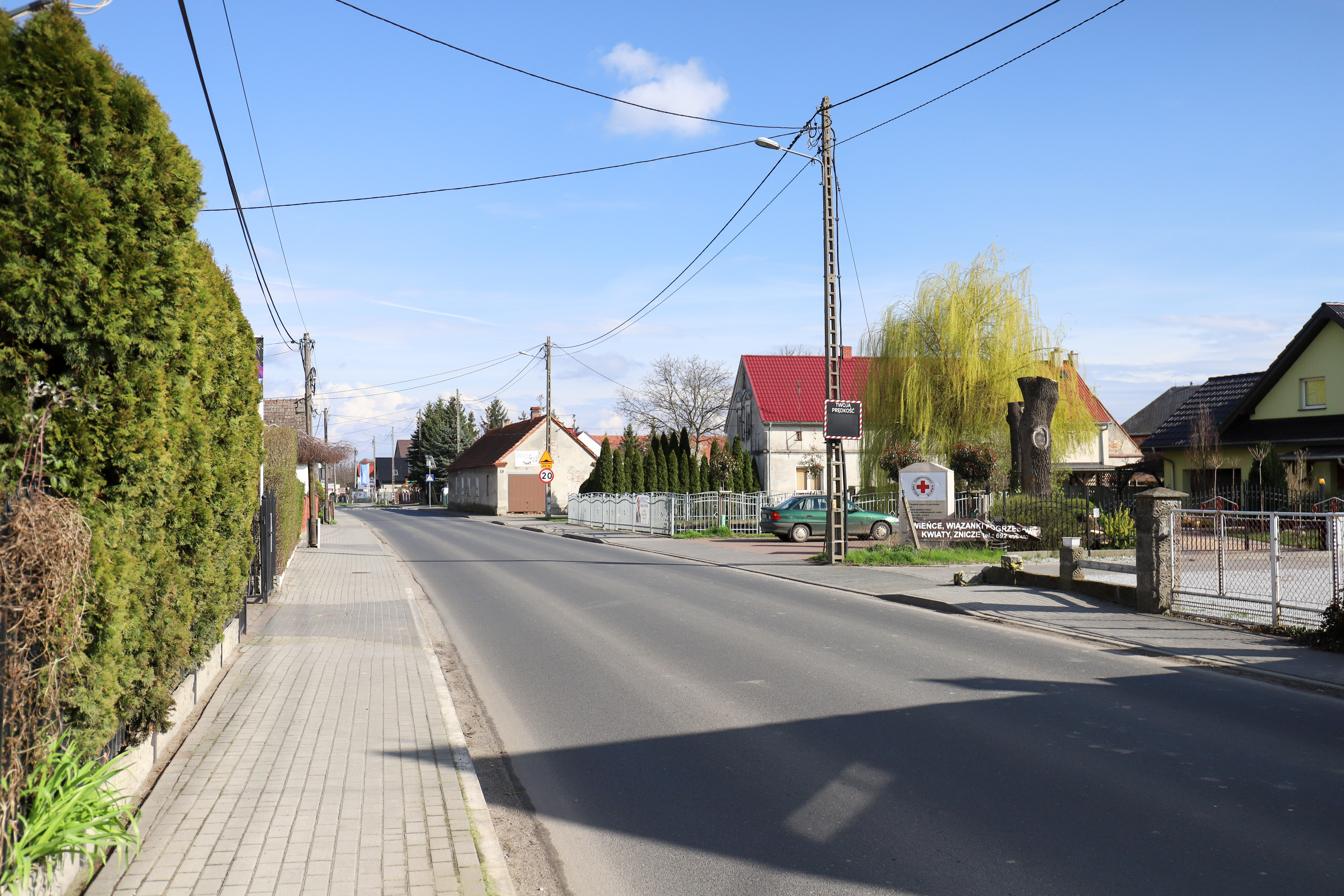

- Location within Poland
- Coordinates: 50°50′N 17°26′E
- Country: Poland
- Voivodeship: Opole
- County: Brzeg
- Gmina: Skarbimierz
- Population: 191
- Time zone: UTC+1 (CET)
  - Summer (DST): UTC+2 (CEST)
- Vehicle registration: OB

Skarbimierz [skarˈbimjɛʂ] is a village in Brzeg County, Opole Voivodeship, in south-western Poland.
