= Zielęcice, Opole Voivodeship =

Zielęcice
- Village
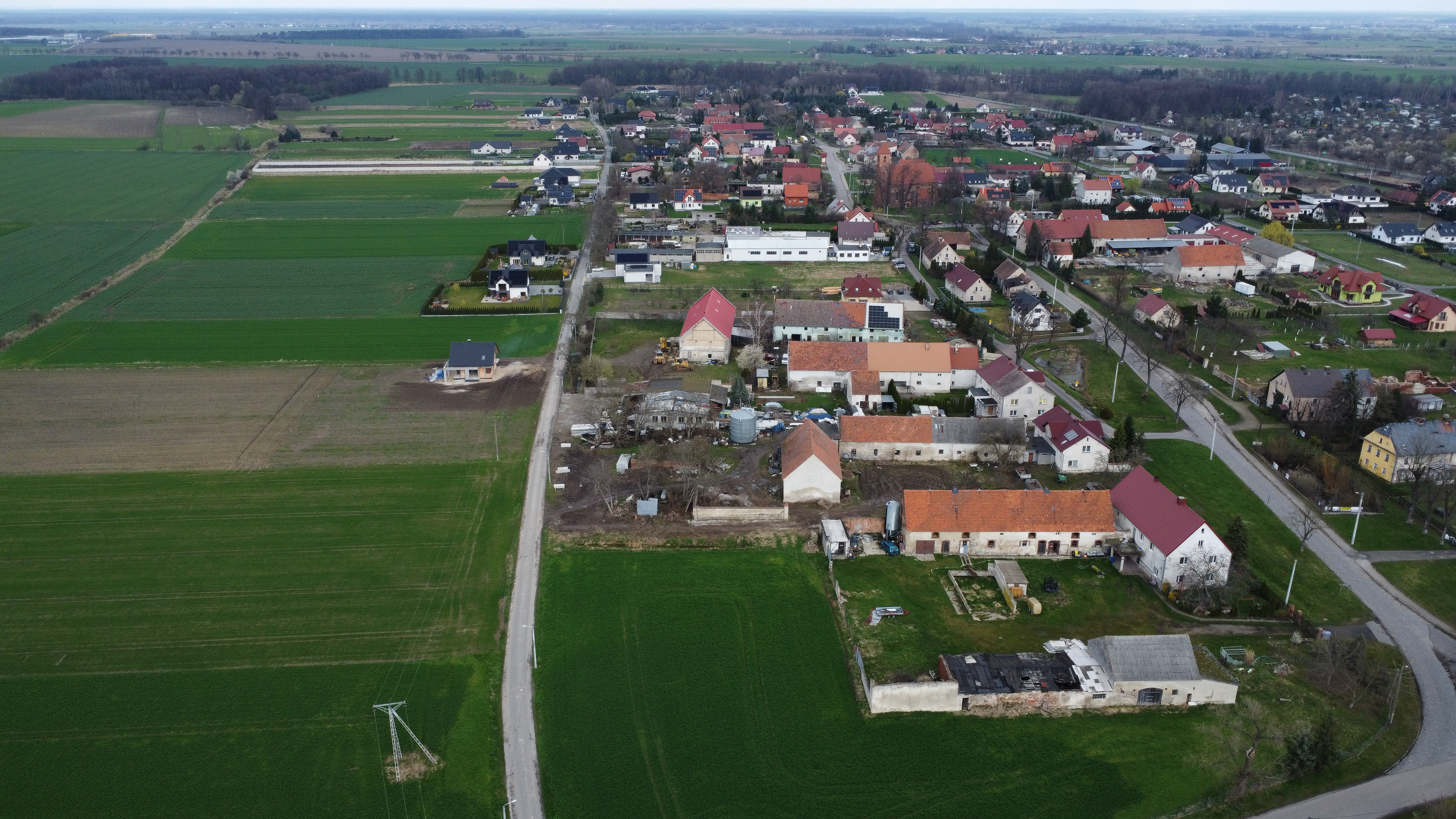

- Location within Poland
- Coordinates: 50°51′53″N 17°24′46″E
- Country: Poland
- Voivodeship: Opole
- County: Brzeg
- Gmina: Skarbimierz

Zielęcice [ʑɛlɛnˈt͡ɕit͡sɛ] is a village in the administrative district of Gmina Skarbimierz, within Brzeg County, Opole Voivodeship, in south-western Poland.
