= Krzekotów =

- Village
- Location within Poland
- Coordinates: 51°42′00″N 16°10′00″E
- Country: Poland
- Voivodeship: Lower Silesian
- County: Głogów
- Gmina: Głogów
- Population: 150

Krzekotów [kʂɛˈkɔtuf] is a village in the administrative district of Gmina Głogów, within Głogów County, Lower Silesian Voivodeship, in south-western Poland.
