= Pawłów, Opole Voivodeship =

Pawłów
- Village
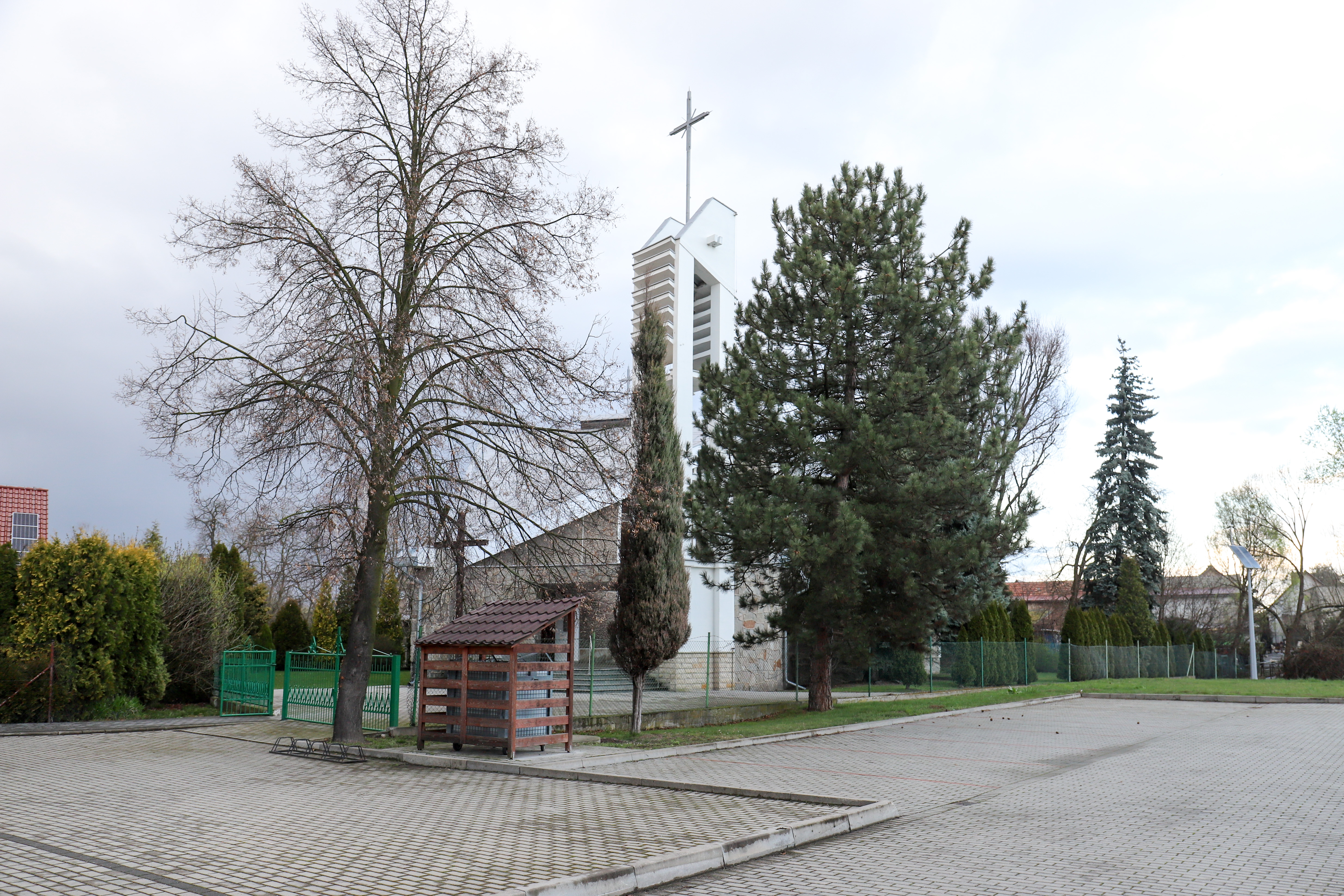
- Catholic church

- Location within Poland
- Coordinates: 50°50′N 17°30′E
- Country: Poland
- Voivodeship: Opole
- County: Brzeg
- Gmina: Skarbimierz

Pawłów [ˈpavwuf] is a village in the administrative district of Gmina Skarbimierz, within Brzeg County, Opole Voivodeship, in south-western Poland.
