= Pępice, Opole Voivodeship =

Pępice
- Village
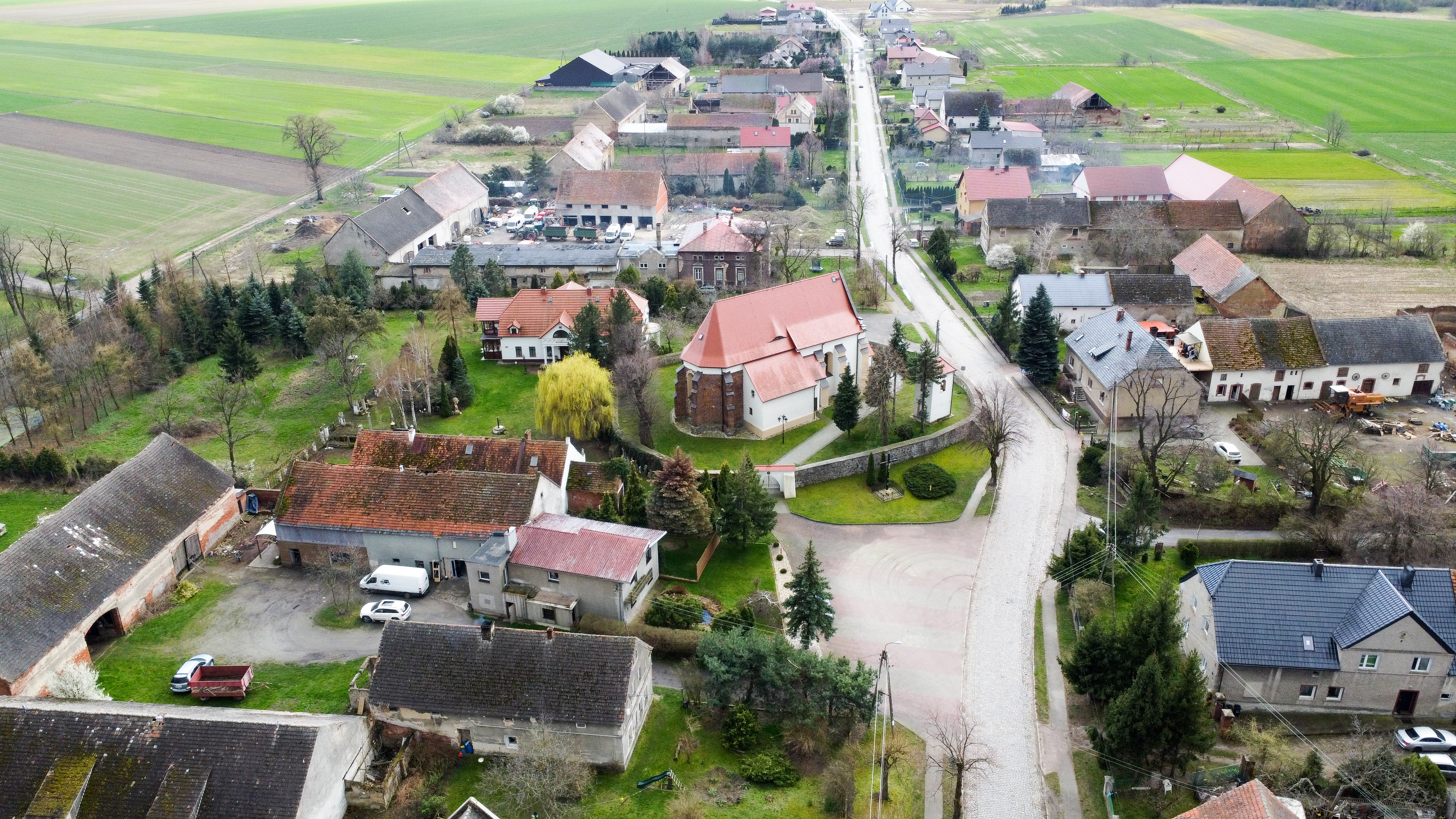

- Location within Poland
- Coordinates: 50°49′N 17°24′E
- Country: Poland
- Voivodeship: Opole
- County: Brzeg
- Gmina: Skarbimierz

Population
  - Total: 360
- Time zone: UTC+1 (CET)
  - Summer (DST): UTC+2 (CEST)
- Vehicle registration: OB

Pępice [pɛmˈpit͡sɛ] is a village in the administrative district of Gmina Skarbimierz, within Brzeg County, Opole Voivodeship, in south-western Poland.

== History ==
The village dates back to the medieval Kingdom of Poland and was first mentioned in the Liber fundationis episcopatus Vratislaviensis chronicle from the late 13th-early 14th century. The region later became part of Bohemia, Prussia and Germany. During World War II, the Germans established a subcamp of the Gross-Rosen concentration camp, whose prisoners were mainly Poles from Warsaw and Kraków.

There is a historic church of Our Lady of the Rosary in Pępice.
