= Zwanowice, Brzeg County =

Zwanowice
- Village
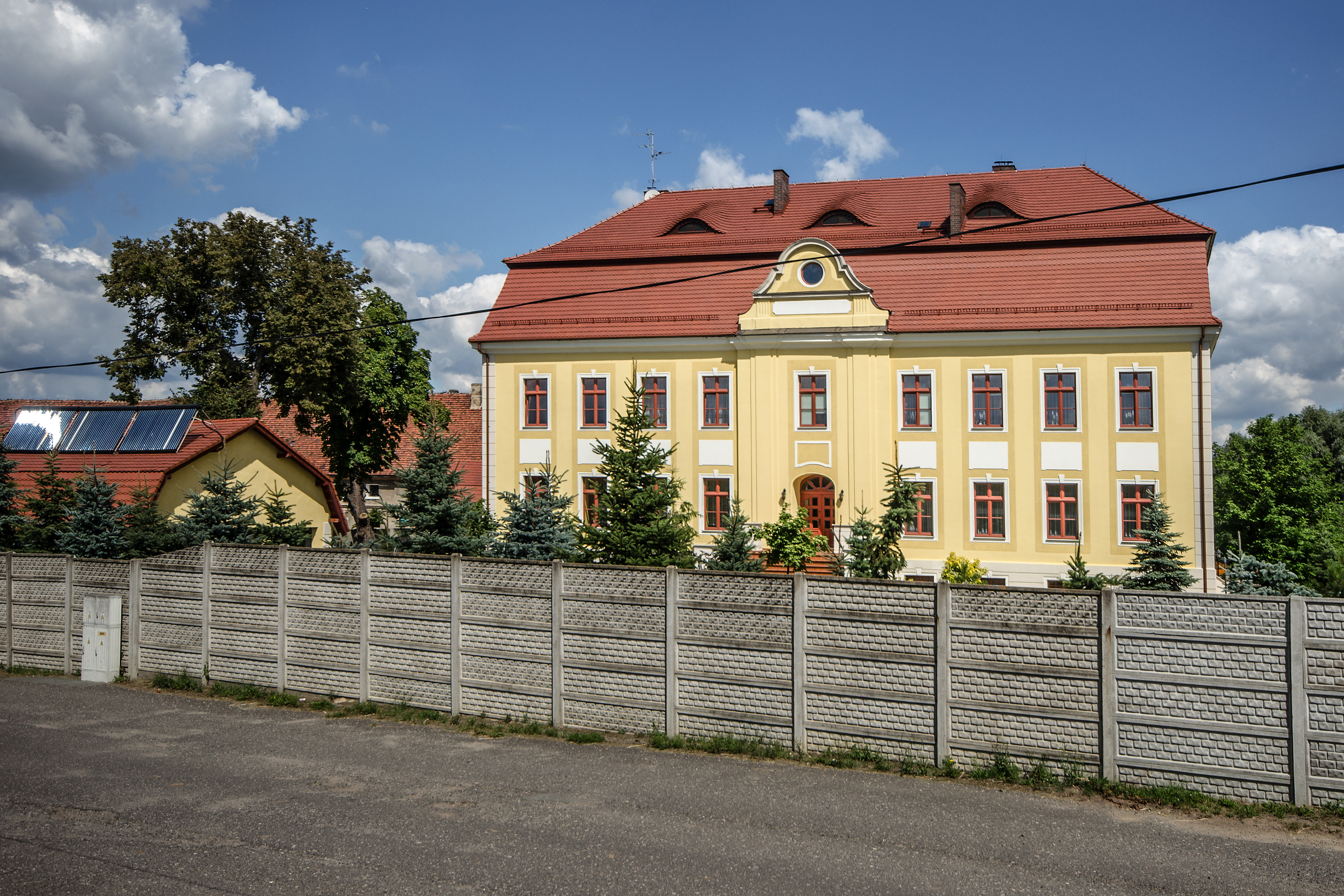
- Palace

- Location within Poland
- Coordinates: 50°49′10″N 17°35′1″E
- Country: Poland
- Voivodeship: Opole
- County: Brzeg
- Gmina: Skarbimierz

Zwanowice [zvanɔˈvit͡sɛ] (German: Schwanowitz) is a village in the administrative district of Gmina Skarbimierz, within Brzeg County, Opole Voivodeship, in south-western Poland.

== Notable residents ==
- Udo von Woyrsch (1895–1983), SS Obergruppenführer
