= Udo von Woyrsch =

German Nazi politician and SS-Obergruppenführer

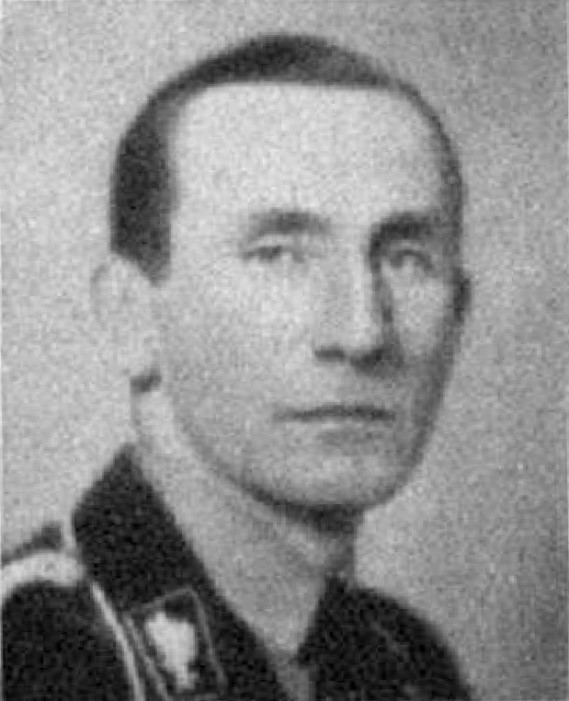

Personal details
- Born: Udo Gustav Wilhelm Egon von Woyrsch; 24 July 1895 Schwanowitz, German Empire
- Died: 14 January 1983 (aged 87) Biberach an der Riss, Baden-Württemberg, West Germany
- Party: Nazi Party
- Occupation: Military officer Estate manager

Military service
- Allegiance: German Empire; Weimar Republic; Nazi Germany
- Branch/service: Imperial German Army; Reichswehr; Schutzstaffel
- Years of service: 1914–1920; 1930–1945
- Rank: Oberleutnant; SS-Obergruppenführer
- Commands: Einsatzgruppe VII; Higher SS and Police Leader "Elbe"
- Battles/wars: World War I World War II
- Awards: Iron Cross, 1st and 2nd class War Merit Cross, 1st and 2nd class, with swords

Udo Gustav Wilhelm Egon von Woyrsch (24 July 1895 – 14 January 1983) was a Nazi Party politician and SS-Obergruppenführer in Nazi Germany who participated in the massacre of Jews in Poland, and was later convicted of being an accessory to manslaughter in connection with the Night of the Long Knives murders.

== Early life ==
Woyrsch was a member of an aristocratic Silesian family. His father was a Rittmeister and estate owner and his uncle was Remus von Woyrsch, a Prussian Field Marshal in the First World War. Born in 1895, he was tutored at home until 1905 then went to secondary school in Brieg (today, Brzeg in Poland) followed by cadet school in Wahlstatt (today, Legnickie Pole) and the military academy at Lichterfelde, Berlin. Commissioned as a Leutnant in the Prussian Army in August 1914, he served on the Eastern Front during the First World War and earned the Iron Cross first and second class. He was captured by the Russians but after the end of the war was repatriated in December 1918. He remained in the Reichswehr, was promoted to Oberleutnant in May 1920 but was decommissioned in the following October. He then took up studies in economics and agriculture. In May 1923, upon his father's death, he inherited the family estate at Schwanowitz (today, Zwanowice, Brzeg County) that he then managed. According to the historian Richard Grunberger, Woyrsch also was a member of the Freikorps during the early 1920s.

== Nazi career ==
On 1 October 1929, Woyrsch joined the Nazi Party (membership number 162,349) and represented it on the Brieg District Assembly and District Committee. As an early Party member, he would later be awarded the Golden Party Badge. On 10 June 1930, he also joined the SS (member number 3,689). The Reichsführer-SS Heinrich Himmler charged Woyrsch with organizing the SS in Gau Silesia. Woyrsch was given command of several SS-Standarten there from March to September 1931. He then was selected as the first commander of SS-Abschnitt (SS–District) VI headquartered in Brieg until 15 March 1932. He next became the commander of SS-Gruppe (later, SS-Oberabschnitt) (SS–Main District) "Südost" where he served until 1 January 1935.

While in this posting, Woyrsch led his forces in the Night of the Long Knives. On 30 June 1934, "he took command in Silesia, and on the orders of Göring arrested a number of SA leaders, disarmed all SA headquarters' guards and occupied the Breslau police headquarters. Woyrsch's men executed some of the SA officers as a result of an on-going private feud." The settlement of personal scores was particularly savage in Silesia, where numerous personal vendettas resulted in murder and "vengeance was the order of the day." This included Woyrsch's ordering the execution of his SS rival Emil Sembach, despite a prior agreement with Himmler that he was to be arrested and taken to Berlin.

Described as highly opinionated and headstrong, Woyrsch often was embroiled in disputes with the Party Gauleiter and other civilian authorities. Woyrsch had a close friendship with Himmler who often defended him in these instances. However, one such dispute with Silesian Gauleiter Helmuth Brückner and other officials resulted in Woyrsch being removed from his command in Dresden and assigned to Himmler's Personal Staff in January 1935. In January 1939, he was detailed for six weeks to the SD, the Nazi Party intelligence service.

Aside from his SS activities, Woyrsch continued his political career in these years, being elected to the Landtag of Prussia in April 1932 and serving there until March 1933 when he was elected as a deputy to the Reichstag from electoral constituency 7 (Breslau). On 10 July 1933, he was also named to the Prussian State Council. He would retain these seats throughout the Nazi regime.

=== Einsatzgruppe and war years ===
On the outbreak of the Second World War in September 1939, Woyrsch commanded Einsatzgruppe VII. Woyrsch was responsible for some of the deadliest massacres of Jews in Poland in 1939, where in East Upper Silesia he led the group that murdered 500 Jews in Kattowitz, Będzin, and Sosnowiec. At this early stage of the war Poland was still considered a military operational area under the command of Generaloberst Gerd von Rundstedt. The brutality and illegal measures of the Einsatzgruppe, involving the mass shootings of Jews, shocked many of the Wehrmacht officers. On 20 September 1939, they complained that it was having an effect on the morale of German troops who resented that the SS were not fighting the enemy on the front but instead "demonstrating their courage against defenceless civilians." Rundstedt told Himmler that the anti-Jewish measures already underway must cease and that the Einsatzgruppe would no longer be tolerated in the operational zone.

Himmler gave way and was forced to recall Woyrsch to Germany where, on 20 April 1940, he was appointed the Higher SS and Police Leader (HSSPF) "Elbe" and commander of SS-Oberabschnitt "Elbe," both headquartered in Dresden. On 15 April 1941, he was given the additional title of General of Police. By 1942 he was the seventh most senior officer in the SS. However, his personality conflicts continued with denunciations and disputes with other authorities. Finally, Himmler lost patience with him and Woyrsch was removed from his command on 13 February 1944 and again assigned to Himmler's immediate staff where he remained for the remainder of the war. Ostensibly, his removal was for health reasons but the real issue was conflicts and disputes with Gauleiter Martin Mutschmann whom he accused of cowardice. According to Richard Grunberger, Woyrsch was part of Himmler's entourage trailing about northern Germany in May 1945 close to the end of hostilities. Woyrsch last saw Himmler on 5 May 1945 in Flensburg before moving on to Eckernförde where he surrendered to British forces on 11 May 1945.

SS ranks
Date	Rank
13 November 1930	SS-Sturmbannführer
1 March 1931	SS-Standartenführer
1 September 1931	SS-Oberführer
15 March 1932	SS-Gruppenführer
1 January 1935	SS-Obergruppenführer
15 April 1941	General der Polizei

== Trials and convictions ==
Woyrsch was interned until 1948. In 1948, a denazification court sentenced him to 10 years in prison for his membership in the SS, citing his knowledge of the organization's atrocities. However, Woyrsch was released early in 1952. In 1957, he was sentenced by a court in Osnabrück to a further 10 years in prison after being convicted as an accessory to six counts of manslaughter for his role in the murders during the Night of the Long Knives, including that of Emil Sembach. Woyrsch was released once more in 1960, and died in 1983.
