= Kruszyna, Opole Voivodeship =

Kruszyna
- Village
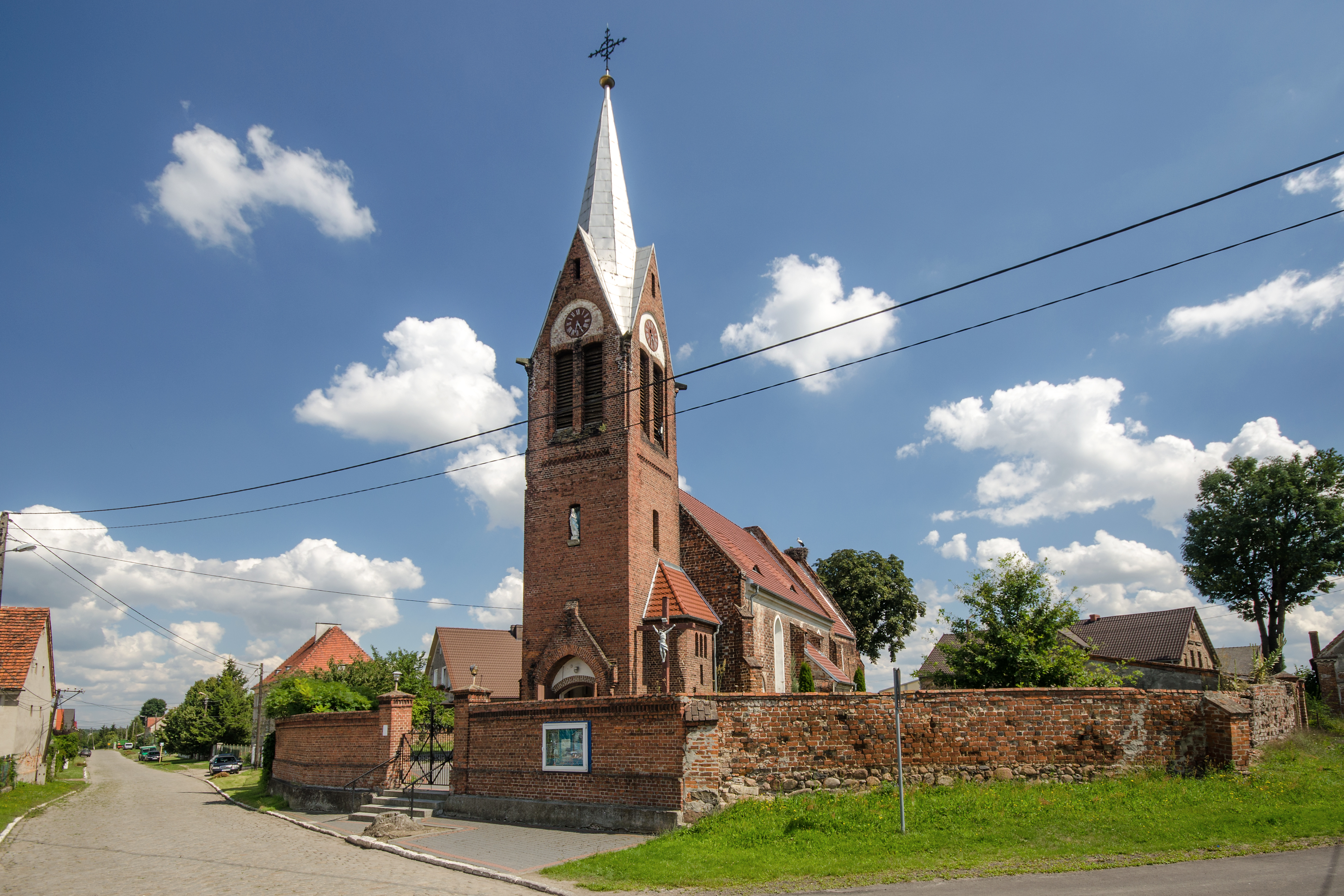
- Catholic church

- Location within Poland
- Coordinates: 50°50′N 17°33′E
- Country: Poland
- Voivodeship: Opole
- County: Brzeg
- Gmina: Skarbimierz

Kruszyna [kruˈʂɨna] is a village in the administrative district of Gmina Skarbimierz, within Brzeg County, Opole Voivodeship, in south-western Poland.
