= Brzezina, Brzeg County =

Village in Silesia

Brzezina
- Village
- Location within Poland
- Coordinates: 50°52′53″N 17°25′24″E
- Country: Poland
- Voivodeship: Opole
- County: Brzeg
- Gmina: Skarbimierz

Brzezina [bʐɛˈʑina] (German Briesen) is a village in the administrative district of Gmina Skarbimierz, within Brzeg County, Opole Voivodeship, in south-western Poland.
