= Turów, Gmina Głogów =

Turów
- Village
- Location within Poland
- Coordinates: 51°37′N 16°07′E
- Country: Poland
- Voivodeship: Lower Silesian
- County: Głogów
- Gmina: Głogów
- Population: 150
- (approximate)
- Time zone: UTC+1 (CET)
  - Summer (DST): UTC+2 (CEST)
- Vehicle registration: DGL

Turów [ˈturuf] is a village in the administrative district of Gmina Głogów, within Głogów County, Lower Silesian Voivodeship, in south-western Poland.

The name of the village is of Polish origin and comes from the word tur, which means "aurochs".
