= Przedmoście, Głogów County =

Przedmoście
- Village
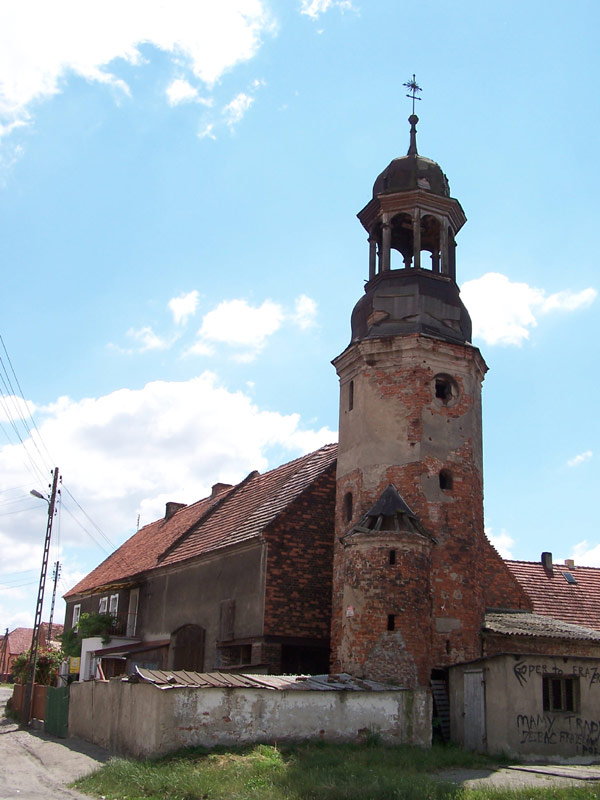

- Location within Poland
- Coordinates: 51°38′N 16°10′E
- Country: Poland
- Voivodeship: Lower Silesian
- County: Głogów
- Gmina: Głogów
- Population: 720
- (approximate)

Przedmoście [pʂɛdˈmɔɕt͡ɕɛ] is a village in the administrative district of Gmina Głogów, within Głogów County, Lower Silesian Voivodeship, in south-western Poland.

The village has an approximate population of 720.
