= Gmina Skarbimierz =

Gmina Skarbimierz Skarbimierz Commune
- Gmina
- Interactive map of Gmina Skarbimierz
- Coordinates (Skarbimierz Osiedle): 50°51′N 17°26′E
- Country: Poland
- Voivodeship: Opole
- County: Brzeg
- Seat: Skarbimierz Osiedle

Area
  - Total: 110.5 km^{2} (42.7 sq mi)

Population (2019-06-30)
  - Total: 8,149
  - Density: 73.75/km^{2} (191.0/sq mi)
- Website: https://skarbimierz.pl

Gmina Skarbimierz is a rural gmina (administrative district) in Brzeg County, Opole Voivodeship, in south-western Poland. Its seat is Skarbimierz Osiedle, near to the village of Skarbimierz, which lies approximately 4 kilometres (2 mi) south-west of Brzeg and 41 km (25 mi) north-west of the regional capital Opole.

The gmina covers an area of 110.5 square kilometres (42.7 sq mi), and as of 2019 its total population is 8,149.

== Villages ==
Gmina Skarbimierz contains the villages and settlements of Bierzów, Brzezina, Kopanie, Kruszyna, Lipki, Łukowice Brzeskie, Małujowice, Pawłów, Pępice, Prędocin, Skarbimierz, Skarbimierz Osiedle, Zielęcice, Żłobizna and Zwanowice.

== Neighbouring gminas ==
Gmina Skarbimierz is bordered by the town of Brzeg and by the gminas of Lewin Brzeski, Lubsza, Oława, Olszanka, Popielów and Wiązów.
