= Wilkow (surname) =

Wilkow is a surname. Notable people with the surname include:

- Andrew Wilkow (born 1972), American radio broadcast host
- Jordan Wilkow, American band keyboardist
- Michael Wilkow (1932–2007), pseudonym for German author Rolf Kalmuczak

== See also ==
- Wilków, geographical locations disambiguation page
