= Prędocin, Opole Voivodeship =

Prędocin
- Village
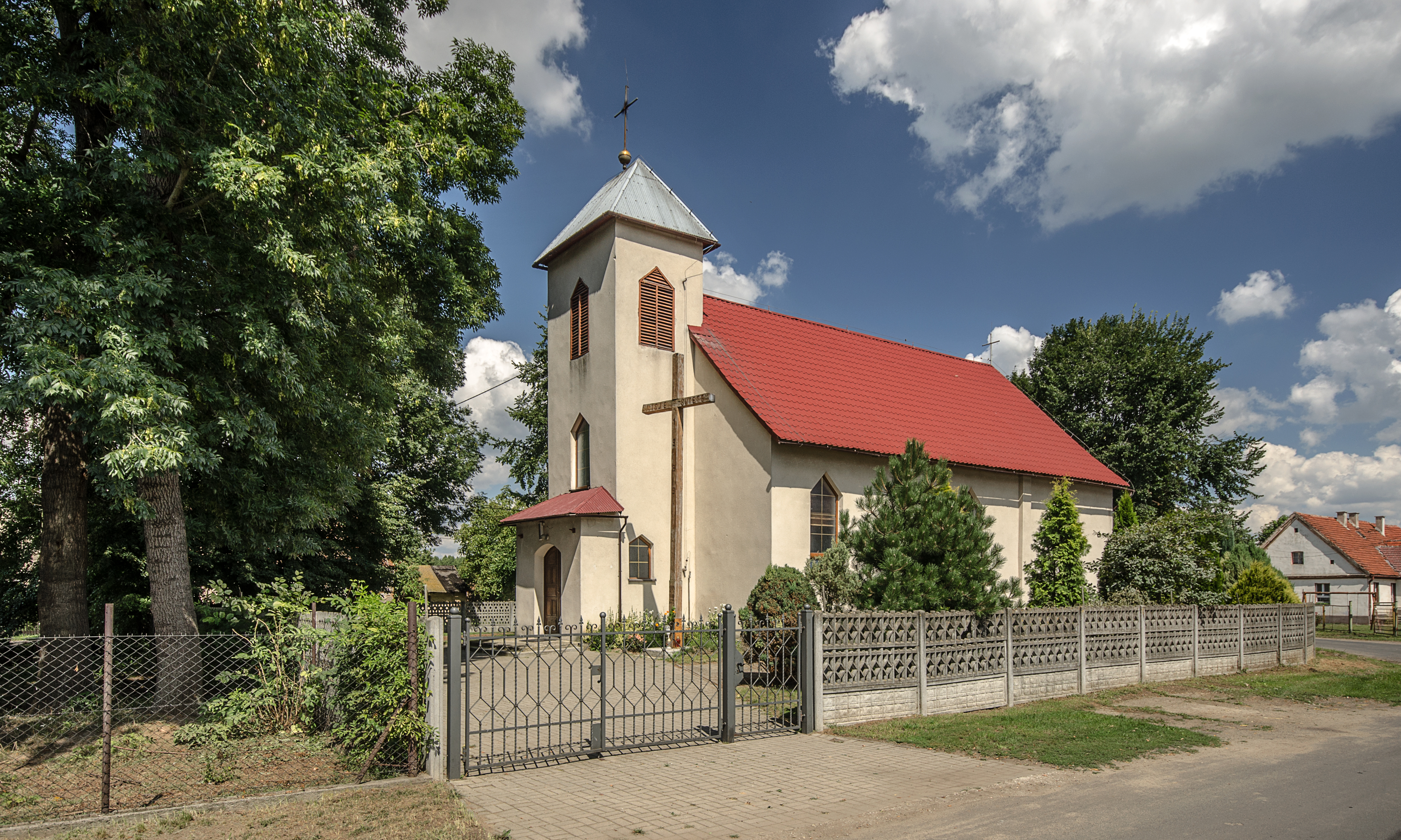
- Church of the Black Madonna of Częstochowa

- Location within Poland
- Coordinates: 50°50′38″N 17°34′15″E
- Country: Poland
- Voivodeship: Opole
- County: Brzeg
- Gmina: Skarbimierz
- Time zone: UTC+1 (CET)
  - Summer (DST): UTC+2 (CEST)
- Vehicle registration: OB

Prędocin [prɛnˈdɔt͡ɕin] is a village in the administrative district of Gmina Skarbimierz, within Brzeg County, Opole Voivodeship, in south-western Poland.

== History ==
The village was mentioned under the Latinized name villa Prendoczino in the Liber fundationis episcopatus Vratislaviensis from ca. 1295–1305, when it was part of fragmented Piast-ruled Poland. Later on, it fell to Bohemia (Czechia), Prussia and Germany. It was reintegrated with Poland in 1945, after the defeat of Germany in World War II.
