= Ruszowice, Głogów County =

Ruszowice
- Village
- Location within Poland
- Coordinates: 51°39′N 16°05′E
- Country: Poland
- Voivodeship: Lower Silesian
- County: Głogów
- Gmina: Głogów
- Population: 640
- (approximate)

Ruszowice [ruʂɔˈvit͡sɛ] is a village in the administrative district of Gmina Głogów, within Głogów County, Lower Silesian Voivodeship, in south-western Poland.
