= Borek, Głogów County =

Borek
- Village
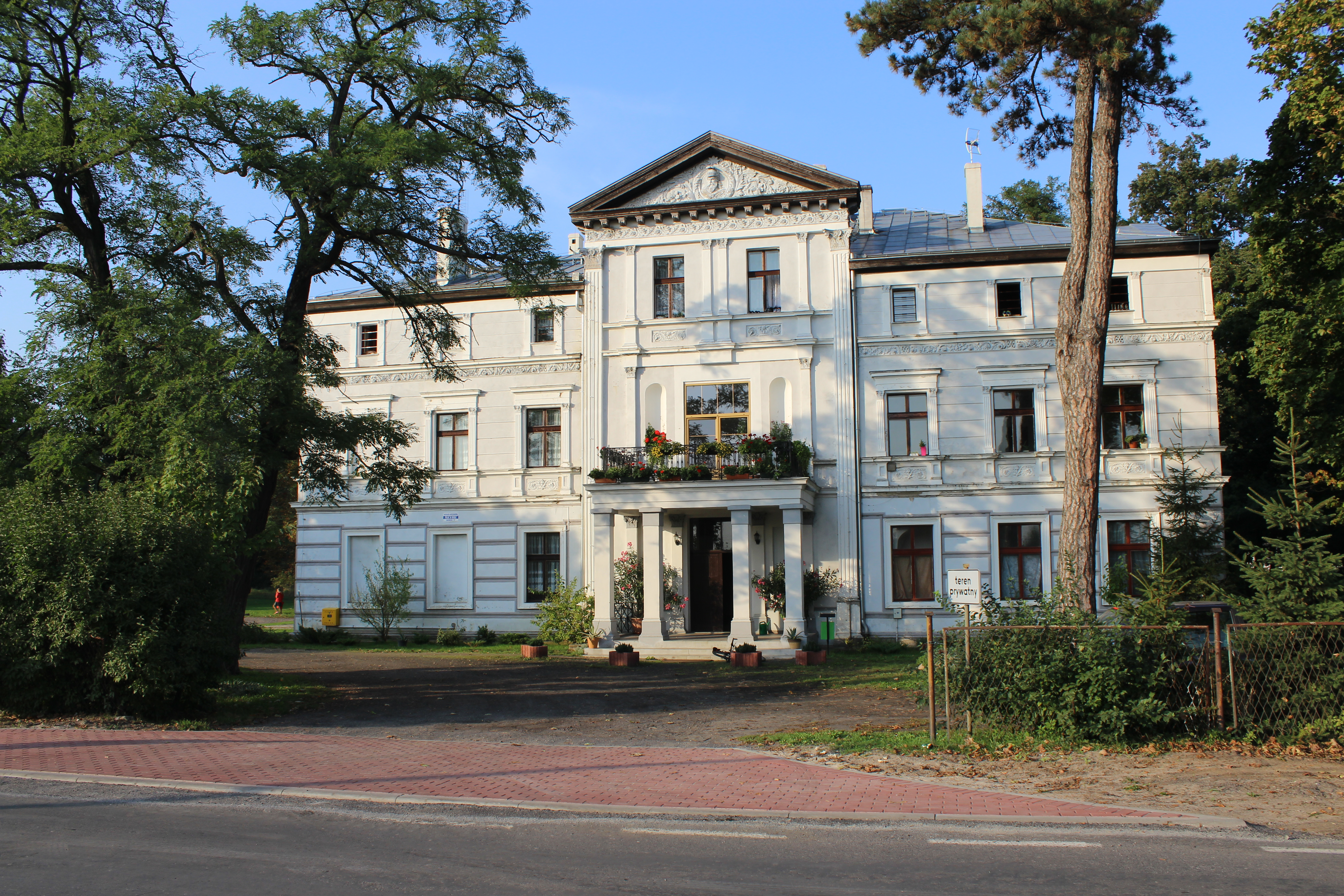
- Palace

- Location within Poland
- Coordinates: 51°38′44″N 16°10′13″E
- Country: Poland
- Voivodeship: Lower Silesian
- County: Głogów
- Gmina: Głogów
- Population: 349
- (approximate)

Borek [ˈbɔrɛk] is a village in the administrative district of Gmina Głogów, within Głogów County, Lower Silesian Voivodeship, in south-western Poland.
