= Bierzów, Opole Voivodeship =

Bierzów
- Village
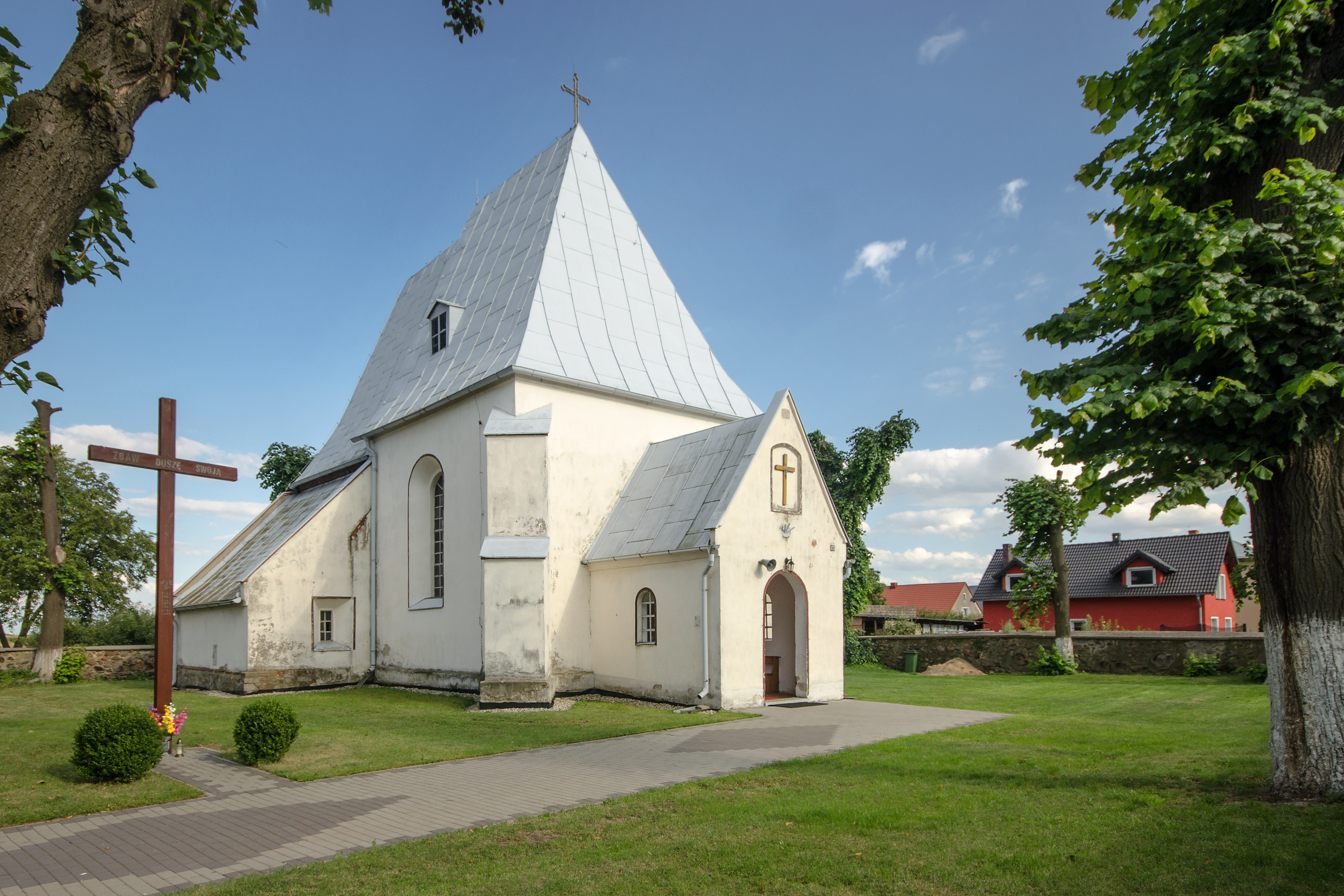
- Church of St. Peter and St. Paul

- Location within Poland
- Coordinates: 50°49′N 17°21′E
- Country: Poland
- Voivodeship: Opole
- County: Brzeg
- Gmina: Skarbimierz
- Elevation: 152 m (499 ft)
- Population: 195

Bierzów [ˈbjɛʐuf] is a village in the administrative district of Gmina Skarbimierz, within Brzeg County, Opole Voivodeship, in south-western Poland.
