= Klucze, Lower Silesian Voivodeship =

Klucze
- Village
- Location within Poland
- Coordinates: 51°41′N 16°10′E
- Country: Poland
- Voivodeship: Lower Silesian
- County: Głogów
- Gmina: Głogów
- Population: 200
- (approximate)

Klucze [ˈklut͡ʂɛ] is a village in the administrative district of Gmina Głogów, within Głogów County, Lower Silesian Voivodeship, in south-western Poland.

The village has an approximate population of 200.
