= Łukowice Brzeskie =

Village in Silesia

- Village
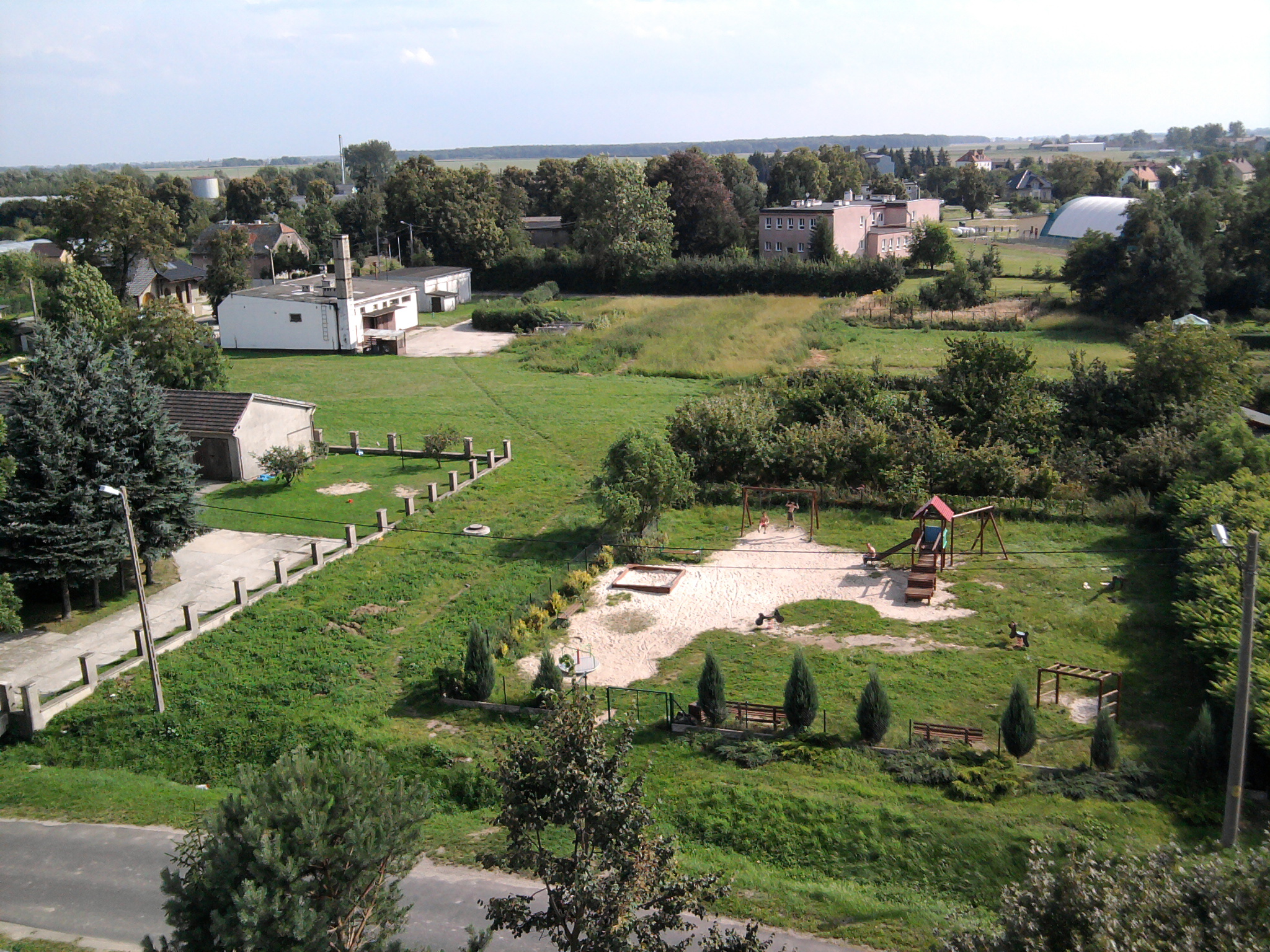

- Location within Poland
- Coordinates: 50°51′N 17°21′E
- Country: Poland
- Voivodeship: Opole
- County: Brzeg
- Gmina: Skarbimierz
- Population (approx.): 654

Łukowice Brzeskie [wukɔˈvit͡sɛ ˈbʐɛskʲɛ] is a village in the administrative district of Gmina Skarbimierz, within Brzeg County, Opole Voivodeship, in south-western Poland.
