= Grodziec Mały =

Village in south-western Poland

- Village
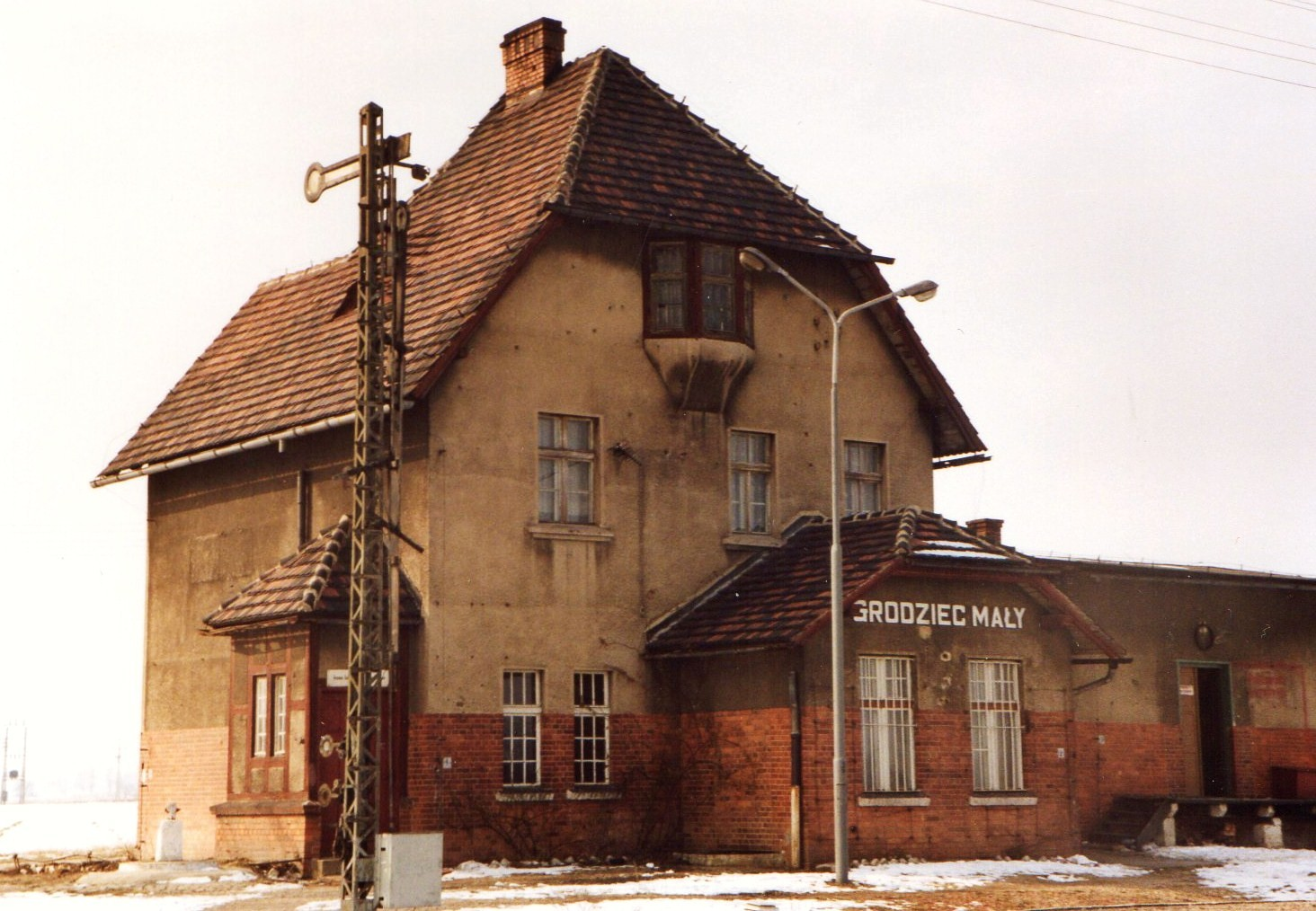
- Railway station

- Location within Poland
- Coordinates: 51°41′13″N 16°04′20″E
- Country: Poland
- Voivodeship: Lower Silesian
- County: Głogów
- Gmina: Głogów
- Population: 500
- (approximate)

Grodziec Mały [ˈɡrɔd͡ʑɛt͡s ˈmawɨ] is a village in the administrative district of Gmina Głogów, within Głogów County, Lower Silesian Voivodeship, in south-western Poland.
