= Gmina Głogów =

Gmina Głogów Głogów Commune
- Gmina
- Flag Coat of arms
- Interactive map of Gmina Głogów
- Coordinates (Głogów): 51°39′32″N 16°04′49″E
- Country: Poland
- Voivodeship: Lower Silesian
- County: Głogów
- Seat: Głogów

Area
  - Total: 84.28 km^{2} (32.54 sq mi)

Population (2019-06-30)
  - Total: 6,767
  - Density: 80.29/km^{2} (208.0/sq mi)
- Website: https://gminaglogow.pl/

Gmina Głogów is a rural gmina (administrative district) in Głogów County, Lower Silesian Voivodeship, in south-western Poland. Its seat is the town of Głogów, although the town is not part of the territory of the gmina.

The gmina covers an area of 84.28 square kilometres (32.54 sq mi), and as of 2019 its total population is 6,767.

== Neighbouring gminas ==
Gmina Głogów is bordered by the town of Głogów and the gminas of Grębocice, Jerzmanowa, Kotla, Pęcław, Szlichtyngowa and Żukowice.

== Villages ==
The gmina contains the villages of Borek, Bytnik, Grodziec Mały, Klucze, Krzekotów, Przedmoście, Ruszowice, Serby, Stare Serby, Szczyglice, Turów, Wilków and Zabornia.
