= Mitsui High-tec =

Japanese manufacturer of precision tooling

Mitsui High-tec, Inc.
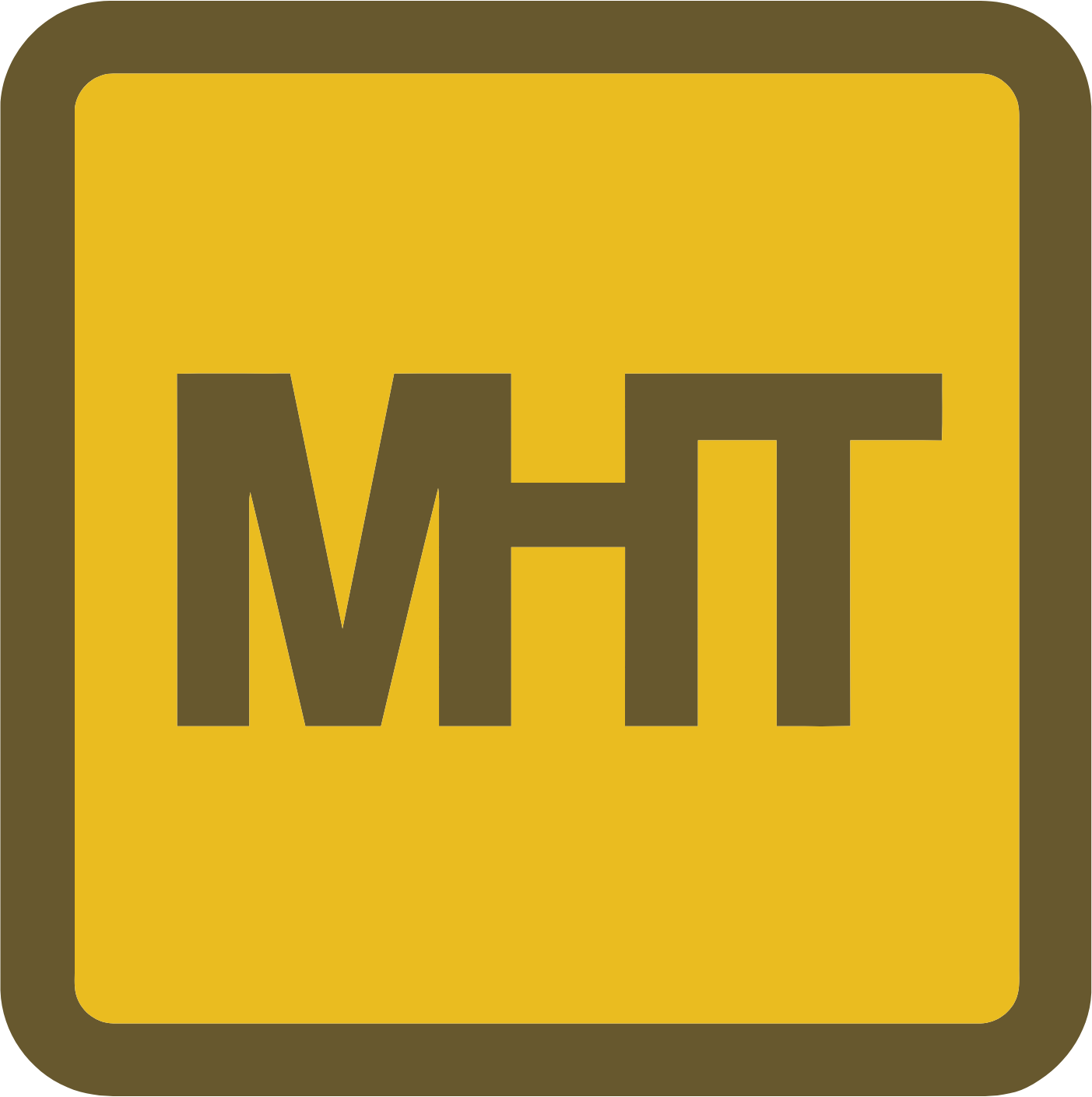

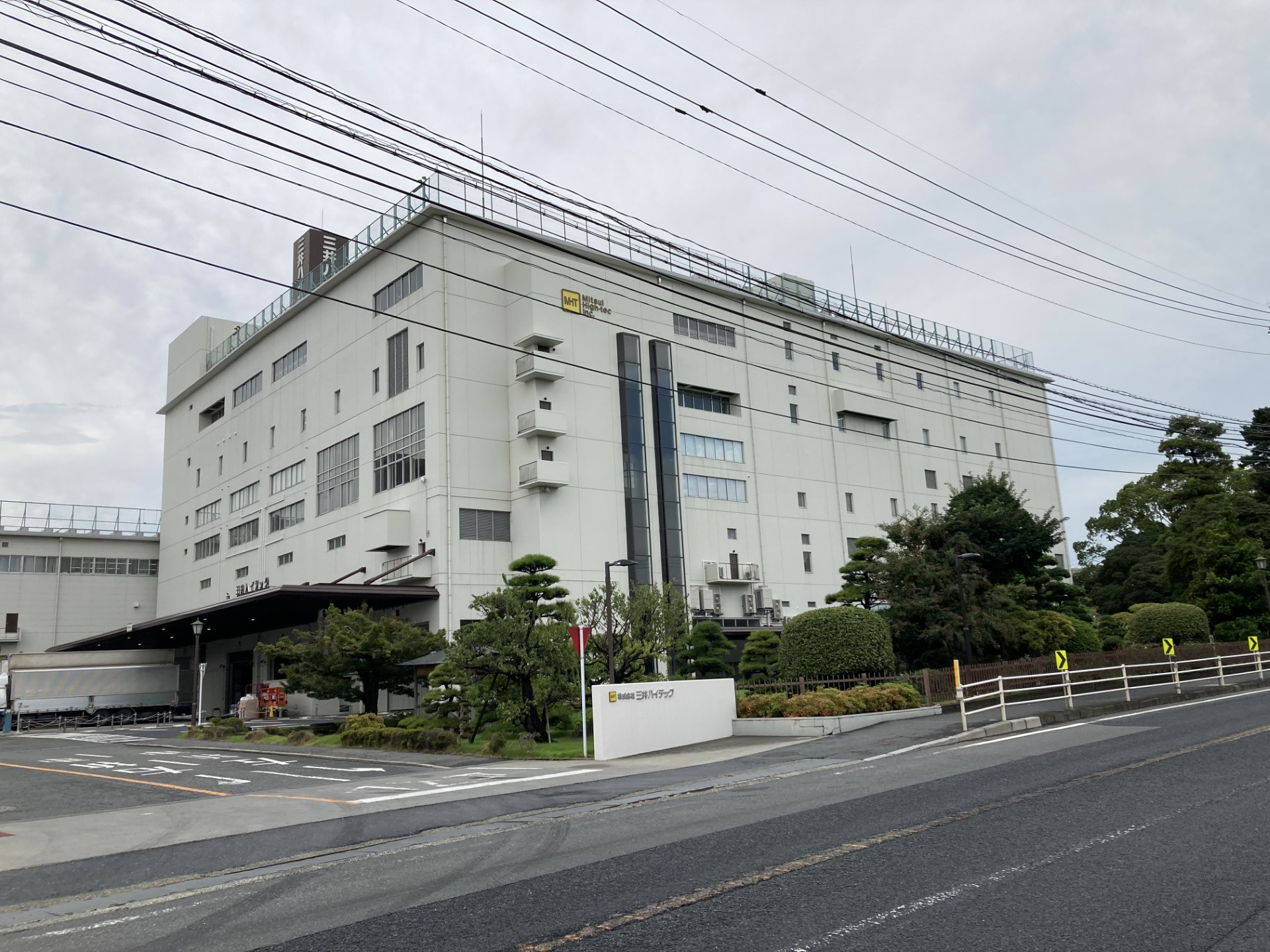
- Headquarters
- Native name: 株式会社三井ハイテック
- Romanized name: Kabushiki gaisha Mitsui Haitekku
- Company type: Public (Kabushiki gaisha)
- Traded as: TYO: 6966; FSE: 6966
- Industry: Machine tools, precision dies
- Founded: January 1949; 77 years ago in Yahata, Japan
- Founder: Yoshiaki Mitsui
- Headquarters: Komine, Yahatanishi-ku, Kitakyushu, Fukuoka Prefecture, Japan
- Key people: Yasunari Mitsui (president)
- Products: Stamping dies, traction motor cores, lead frames
- Number of employees: 5,091 (2025)
- Website: www.mitsui-high-tec.com

Mitsui High-tec, Inc. (Japanese: 株式会社三井ハイテック) is a Japanese manufacturer of precision dies, motor cores for traction motors, and lead frames, based in Kitakyushu, Fukuoka Prefecture. Founded in 1949 as a manufacturer of stamping dies, the company expanded rapidly following its development of a stamping process for IC lead frame production. It is currently a major global supplier of the laminated motor cores used in hybrid and electric vehicles, with local subsidiaries in the Chinese, North American, and European markets. The company is not affiliated with the Mitsui Group; it is named for its founder, Yoshiaki Mitsui.

== History ==
The company was established as "Mitsui Manufacturing" (Japanese: 三井工作所) by Yoshiaki Mitsui on 12 January 1949. Mitsui, who had previously worked as a die operator at the Yaskawa Electric Corporation, decided to start his own tool and die company with two former colleagues from Yaskawa. The company's first workshop, which was located in the Kurosaki section of Yahata City (now Yahatanishi-ku, Kitakyushu), consisted of only 10 square metres (110 sq ft). Mitsui's focus was on the fabrication and sale of stamping dies. In 1950, it developed its first surface grinder. Its current headquarters in the Komine section of Yahata opened in October 1960.

In 1961, Yoshiaki Mitsui visited NASA facilities in California, where he encountered IC lead frames. Mitsui was convinced that he could revolutionise the production of these delicate components, theretofore produced with photo etching, with his company's tungsten carbide stamping die technology. Mitsui was successful; production began in June 1969, and Mitsui would go on to receive an order from American manufacturer Texas Instruments.

In 1974, Mitsui developed the "Mitsui Automatic Core" (MAC) assembly system, which automated the process used to stamp, stack and join thin sheets of electrical steel, known as "laminations". Also in 1974, it created an "ultra-fast die" that raised stamping speed from the previous limit of 300–400 strokes per minute (spm) to up to 1,450 spm. These innovations greatly reduced the time and cost required to produce rotor and stator stacks (or 'motor cores'), the two primary components of electric motors.

Requiring new facilities to accommodate the growth of its lead frame business, Mitsui expanded its Komine plant in 1982. IC-related production grew to comprise more than 70% of Mitsui's total output; in recognition of this, Mitsui Manufacturing was renamed "Mitsui High-tec" on 8 May 1984. It was listed on the Fukuoka Stock Exchange on 3 September 1984.

Starting with the Prius in 1997, Mitsui High-tec developed precision dies that were critical to realising the production of the high-performance traction motors used in Toyota's hybrid electric cars. It would go on to work with other Japanese manufacturers, such as Nissan and Honda. As of 2012, it was Toyota's primary supplier of laminated stacks. The Yomiuri Shimbun reported in 2022 that Mitsui High-tec held approximately 40% of the global market share in the motor core sector.

Mitsui High-tec opened a factory to produce motor cores for North American electric and hybrid vehicles at Brantford, Ontario, in 2017. The provincial government's Jobs and Prosperity Fund invested up to 2 million Canadian dollars in the enterprise. In 2019, it began operating its first European motor core factory, located at Skarbimierz-Osiedle, Poland. The site was chosen for its proximity to Toyota's facilities in Wałbrzych.

== Corporate culture ==
The company's slogan is "ultra-precision technology to shape tomorrow" (Japanese: 超精密加工でしあわせな未来を).

All new employees, whether factory or office workers, participate in a mandatory seventy-day diemaking course. This is intended to teach employees how difficult it is to create a flat, perpendicular workpiece, and by extension, the effort required to produce any manufactured component.

== Subsidiaries ==
The company has one domestic and twelve global subsidiaries. Some of these are:

- in North America: Mitsui High-tec (Canada), Inc. (Canada) and Mitsui High-tec Mexicana, S.A. (Mexico)
- in Europe: Mitsui High-tec (Europe) Sp. Z o.o. (Poland)
- in Asia: Mitsui High-tec (Guang Dong) Co., Ltd. (Guangdong, China) and Mitsui High-tec (Malaysia) Sdn. Bhd. (Malaysia)
