= Sieniawka =

Sieniawka may refer to the following places in Poland:

- Sieniawka, Dzierżoniów County, in Gmina Łagiewniki, Lower Silesian Voivodeship
- Sieniawka, Zgorzelec County, in Gmina Bogatynia, Lower Silesian Voivodeship
