= Wilków, Głogów County =

Wilków
- Village
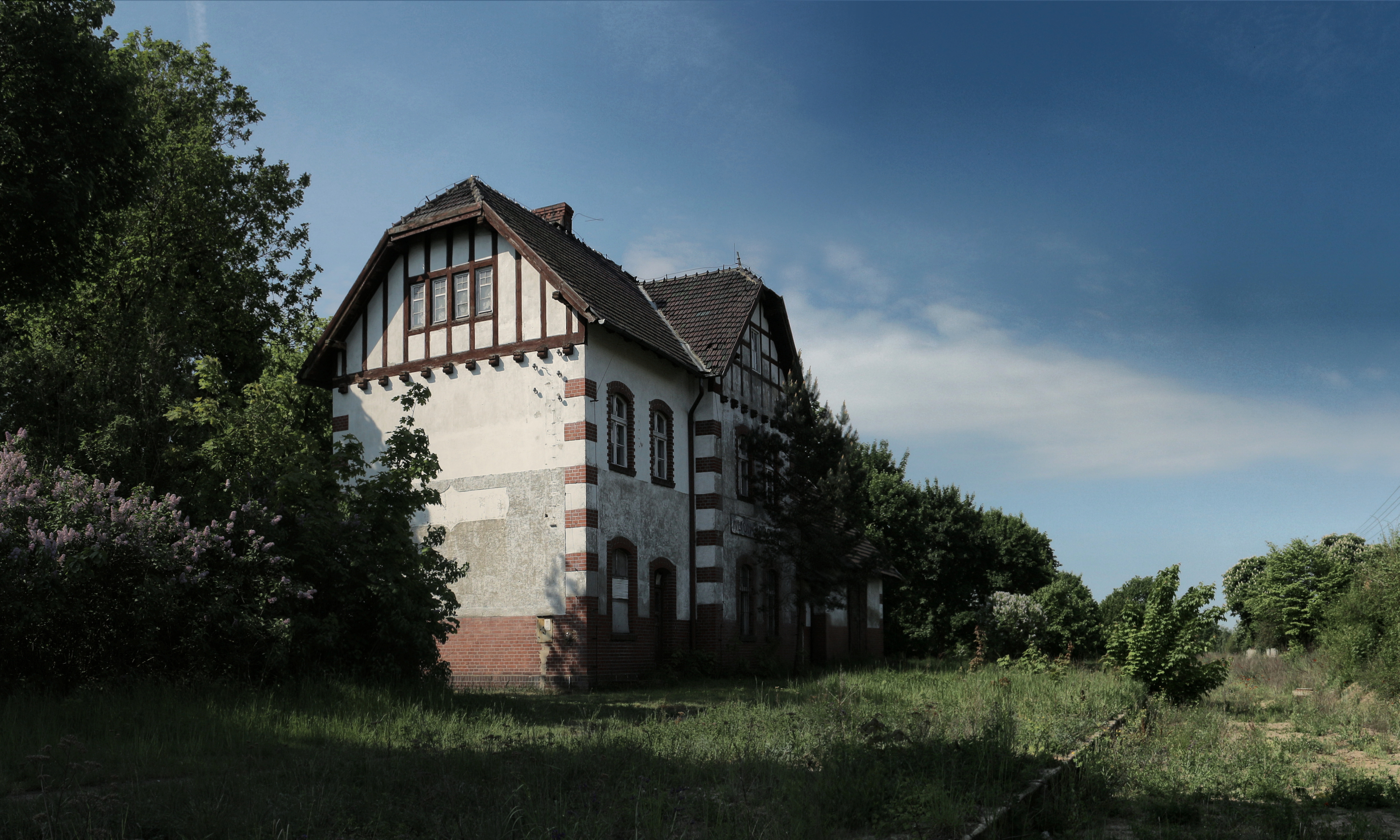
- Railway station

- Location within Poland
- Coordinates: 51°42′N 16°12′E
- Country: Poland
- Voivodeship: Lower Silesian
- County: Głogów
- Gmina: Głogów

Population
  - Total: 500
- (approximate)
- Time zone: UTC+1 (CET)
  - Summer (DST): UTC+2 (CEST)
- Vehicle registration: DGL

Wilków [ˈvilkuf] is a village in the administrative district of Gmina Głogów, within Głogów County, Lower Silesian Voivodeship, in south-western Poland.
