= Strzelin railway station =

Railway station in Poland

Strzelin
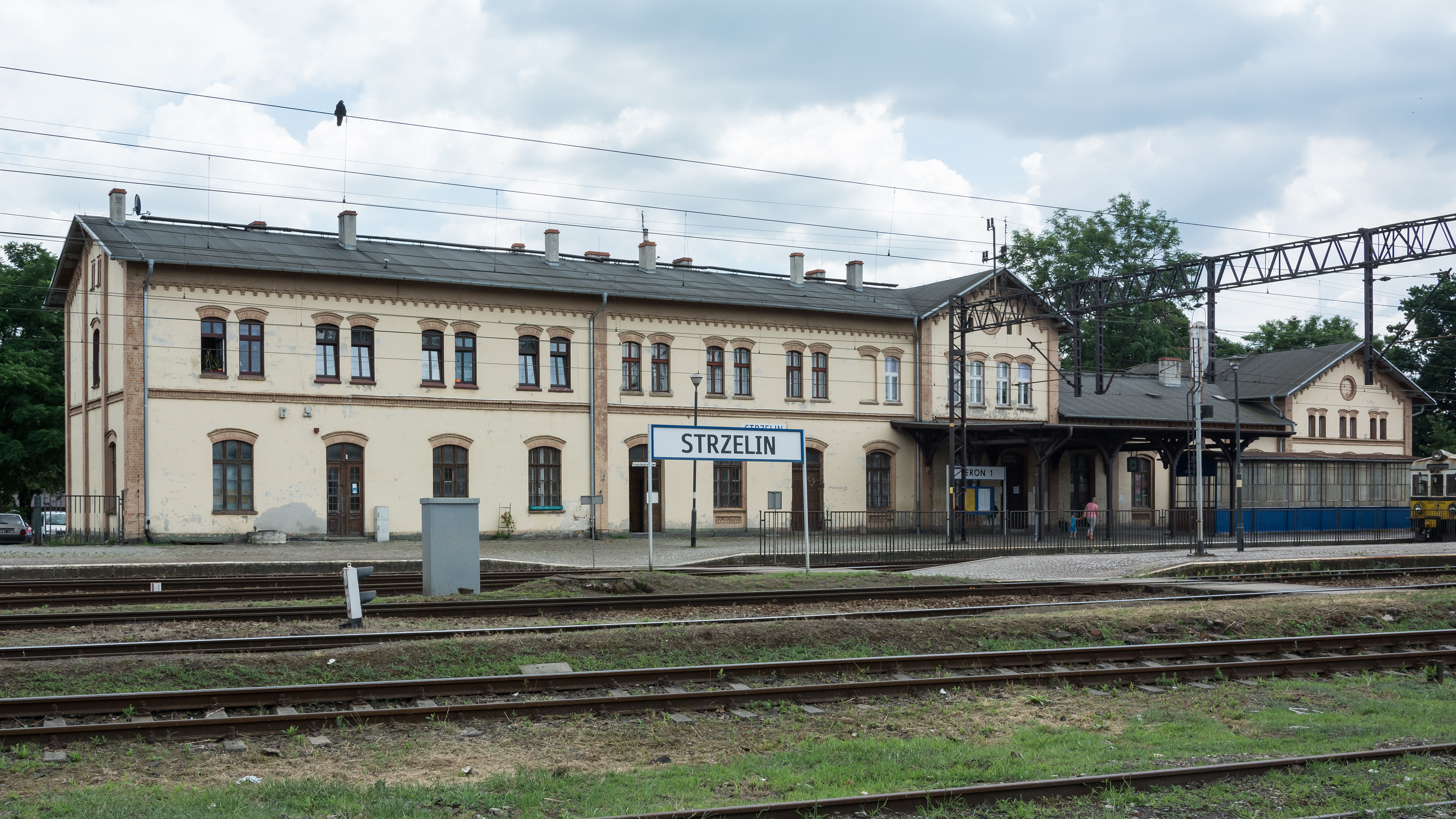
- Strzelin railway station in 2016

General information
- Location: Strzelin, Lower Silesian Voivodeship; Poland
- Coordinates: 50°47′06″N 17°03′37″E
- Owner: Polskie Linie Kolejowe
- Lines: Wrocław–Międzylesie; Brzeg–Łagiewniki
- Platforms: 2
- Tracks: 3
- Train operators: PKP Intercity; Lower Silesian Railways

History
- Opened: 1871
- Electrified: 1991
- Former names: Strehlen (before 1914); Strehlen (Schleisen) (1914–1945); Strzelno Śląskie (1945–1946); Strzelin Śląski (1947–1948)
Location
- Location within Poland Location within Lower Silesian Voivodeship

Strzelin is a railway station in Strzelin, in the Lower Silesian Voivodeship in Poland. It is one of the more important railway stations on the Wrocław–Międzylesie railway line: it includes, among others, sidings of industrial significance, such as those of the largest granite quarry in Poland and the sugar mill in Strzelin.

Passenger trains passing through the station are operated by Lower Silesian Railways and PKP Intercity (formerly also by Polregio).

== Passenger traffic ==
Year	Passenger exchange per day	Place in Poland	Average number of stops per day
2017	1,300	170th	-
2022	2,300	119th	40
2024	2,500	130th	43

Strzelin station regularly ranks among the top ten in terms of passenger traffic in Lower Silesia.

== History ==
- 1871 – completion of the construction of the lowland section Wrocław Główny–Strzelin, of the planned railway line from Wrocław to Kłodzko.
- 1872 – a station building was built
- 1873 – official railway line opening
- 1884 – opening of the Strzelin – Kondratowice – Niemcza section
- 1894 – opening of the Strzelin – Głęboka Śląska section
- 1910 – obtaining a connection to Brzeg
- 1989 – passenger transport on the Brzeg – Strzelin route was ceased
- October 2017 – PKP signed a contract with the company Berger Bau Polska for the general renovation of the railway station
- December 2017 – the takeover by the Lower Silesian Railways from Przewozy Regionalne of the majority of rail connections running through Strzelin station
- 21 December 2018 – The renovated station was reopened to travelers.
- December 2024 – the complete takeover by the Lower Silesian Railways of regional connections running through Strzelin station

== Train routes ==
Regional, long-distance, and international trains currently operated by the following companies run through Strzelin station:

- PKP Intercity: including: Bydgoszcz, Bystrzyca Kłodzka, Brzeg, Gdańsk, Gdynia, Gniezno, Kłodzko, Kudowa-Zdrój, Leszno, Międzylesie, Oława, Opole, Pardubice, Polanica-Zdrój, Poznań, Prague, Tczew, Warsaw, Wrocław
- Lower Silesian Railways: among others to: Wrocław, Oborniki Śląskie, Rawicz, Ziębice, Kamieniec Ząbkowicki, Kłodzko, Międzylesie, Lichkov, Kudowa-Zdrój, Polanica-Zdrój. On the route, replacement bus services are organized to Stronie Śląskie.
