= Wilczków =

Wilczków may refer to the following places in Poland:

- Wilczków, Gmina Malczyce, in Środa County, Lower Silesian Voivodeship (south-west Poland)
- Wilczków, Wrocław County, in Lower Silesian Voivodeship (south-west Poland)
- Wilczków, Poddębice County, in Łódź Voivodeship (central Poland)
- Wilczków, Sieradz County, in Łódź Voivodeship (central Poland)
