= Żłobizna =

Village in Silesia

- Village
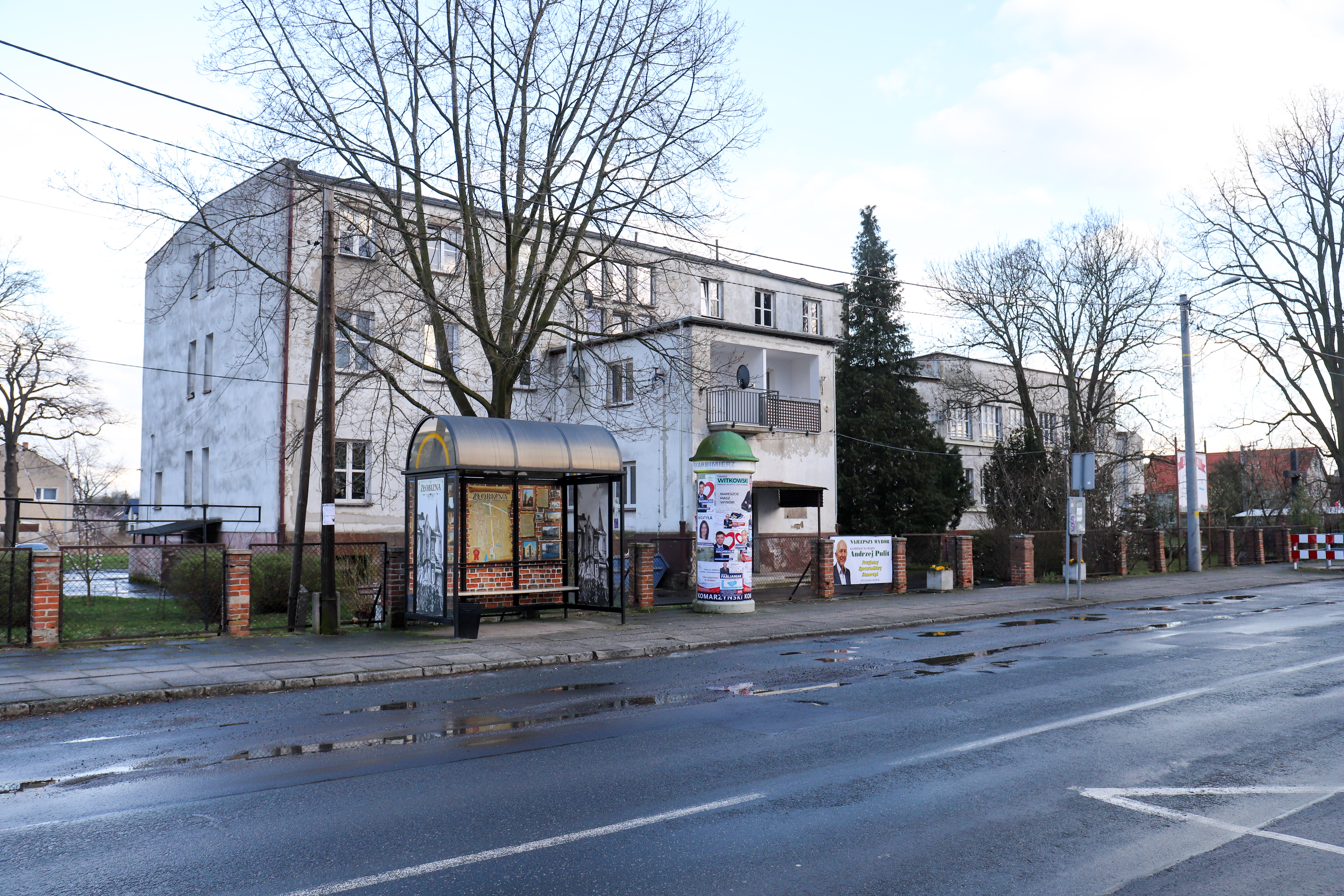

- Location within Poland
- Coordinates: 50°50′31″N 17°27′31″E
- Country: Poland
- Voivodeship: Opole
- County: Brzeg
- Gmina: Skarbimierz

Żłobizna [ʐwɔˈbizna] is a village in the administrative district of Gmina Skarbimierz, within Brzeg County, Opole Voivodeship, in south-western Poland.
