= Bolewice =

Bolewice refers to the following places in Poland:

- Bolewice, Greater Poland Voivodeship
- Bolewice, West Pomeranian Voivodeship
