= Serby, Lower Silesian Voivodeship =

Serby
- Village
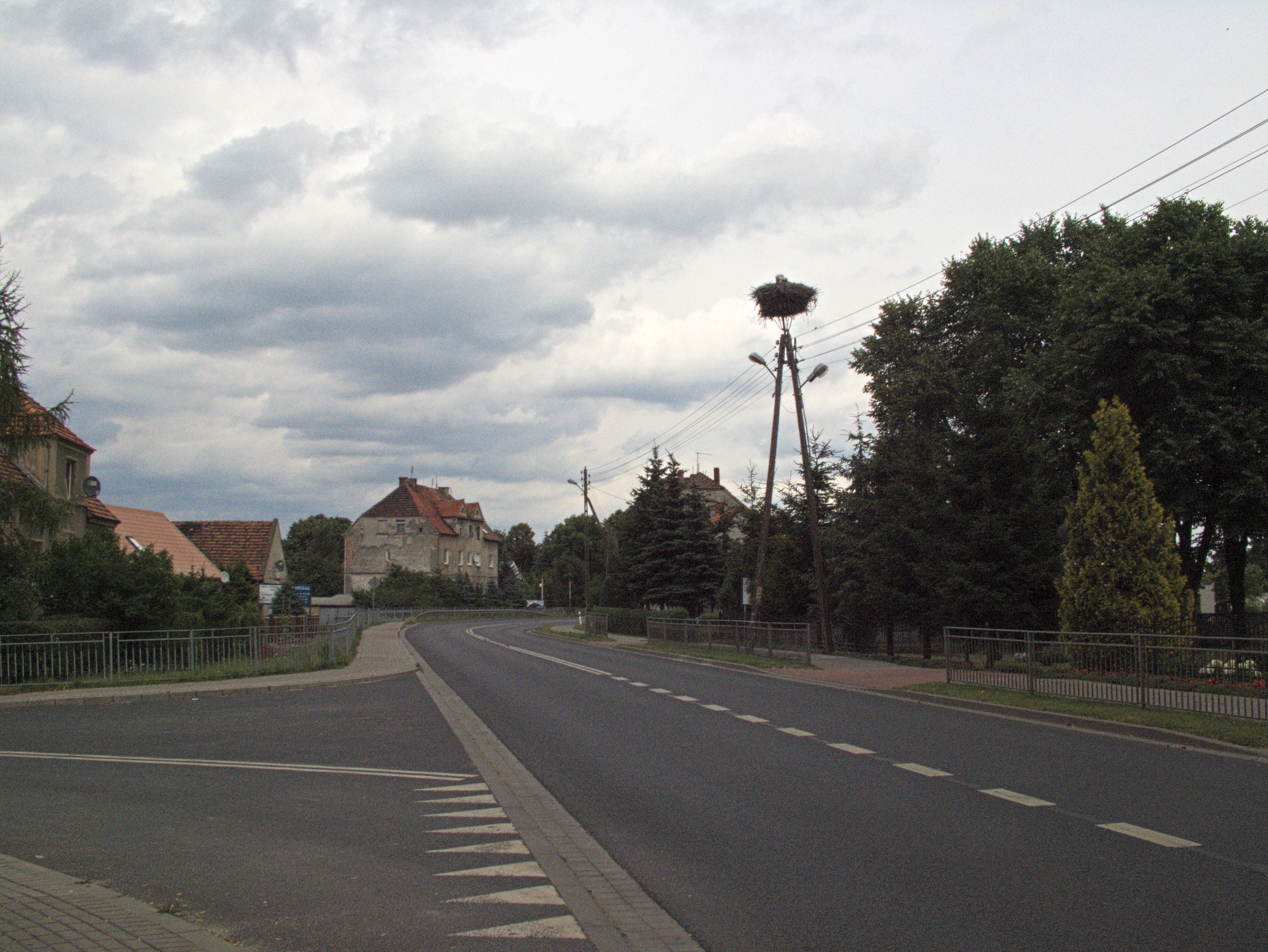

- Location within Poland
- Coordinates: 51°41′N 16°7′E
- Country: Poland
- Voivodeship: Lower Silesian
- County: Głogów
- Gmina: Głogów
- Population: 1,200
- (approximate)

Serby ([ˈsɛrbɨ]) is a village in the administrative district of Gmina Głogów, within Głogów County, Lower Silesian Voivodeship, in south-western Poland.
