= Wierzchownia =

Wierzchownia may refer to the following places:

- Wierzchownia in Gmina Pęcław, Głogów County in Lower Silesian Voivodeship (SW Poland)
- Wierzchownia in Gmina Górzno, Brodnica County in Kuyavian-Pomeranian Voivodeship (N Poland)
- Wierzchownia (Ukraina) (Верхівня, Українська) in Ruzhyn Raion, Zhytomyr Oblast (Ukraine)
