= Gaiki =

Gaiki may refer to the following places in Poland:

- Gaiki in Gmina Jerzmanowa, Głogów County in Lower Silesian Voivodeship (SW Poland)
- Other places called Gaiki (listed in Polish Wikipedia)
