= Białołęka (disambiguation) =

Białołęka may refer to the following places in Poland:

- Białołęka, a district of Warsaw
- Białołęka, a village in Gmina Pęcław, Głogów County, in Lower Silesian Voivodeship (SW Poland)
