= Brzeg Głogowski =

- Village
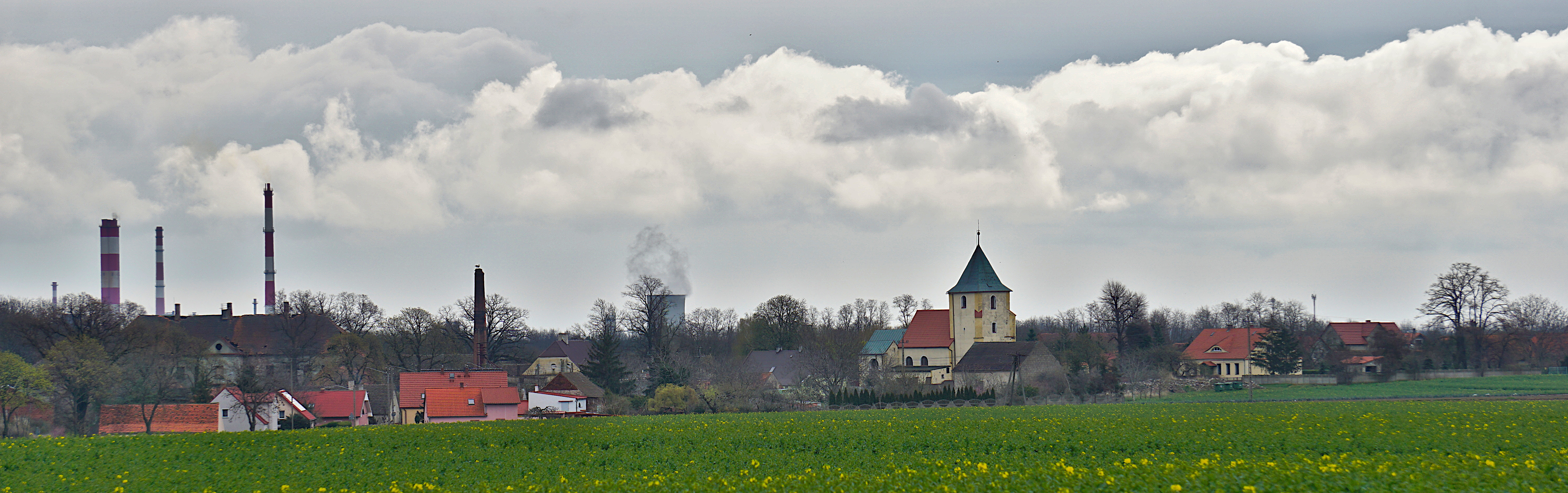

- Location within Poland
- Coordinates: 51°41′45″N 15°54′55″E
- Country: Poland
- Voivodeship: Lower Silesian
- County: Głogów
- Gmina: Żukowice
- Population: 500

Brzeg Głogowski [ˈbʐɛk ɡwɔˈɡɔfski] is a village in the administrative district of Gmina Żukowice, within Głogów County, Lower Silesian Voivodeship, in south-western Poland.

Brzeg Głogowski is approximately 6 km (4 mi) north-west of Żukowice, 13 km (8 mi) west of Głogów, and 101 km (63 mi) north-west of the regional capital Wrocław.
