= Zabłocie =

Zabłocie may refer to:

- Zabłocie, Bolesławiec County in Lower Silesian Voivodeship (south-west Poland)
- Zabłocie, Głogów County in Lower Silesian Voivodeship (south-west Poland)
- Zabłocie, Kłodzko County in Lower Silesian Voivodeship (south-west Poland)
- Zabłocie, Silesian Voivodeship (south Poland)
- Zabłocie, Kuyavian-Pomeranian Voivodeship (north-central Poland)
- Zabłocie, Gmina Biała Podlaska in Lublin Voivodeship (east Poland)
- Zabłocie, Gmina Kodeń in Lublin Voivodeship (east Poland)
- Zabłocie, Biłgoraj County in Lublin Voivodeship (east Poland)
- Zabłocie, Podlaskie Voivodeship (north-east Poland)
- Zabłocie, Hajnówka County in Podlaskie Voivodeship (north-east Poland)
- Zabłocie, Łask County in Łódź Voivodeship (central Poland)
- Zabłocie, Radomsko County in Łódź Voivodeship (central Poland)
- Zabłocie, Rawa County in Łódź Voivodeship (central Poland)
- Zabłocie, Wieluń County in Łódź Voivodeship (central Poland)
- Zabłocie, Lublin County in Lublin Voivodeship (east Poland)
- Zabłocie, Puławy County in Lublin Voivodeship (east Poland)
- Zabłocie, Lesser Poland Voivodeship (south Poland)
- Zabłocie, Świętokrzyskie Voivodeship (south-central Poland)
- Zabłocie, Legionowo County in Masovian Voivodeship (east-central Poland)
- Zabłocie, Radom County in Masovian Voivodeship (east-central Poland)
- Zabłocie, Siedlce County in Masovian Voivodeship (east-central Poland)
- Zabłocie, Greater Poland Voivodeship (west-central Poland)
- Zabłocie, Lubusz Voivodeship (west Poland)
- Zabłocie, Słupsk County in Pomeranian Voivodeship (north Poland)
- Zabłocie, Bartoszyce County in Warmian-Masurian Voivodeship (north Poland)
- Zabłocie, Ostróda County in Warmian-Masurian Voivodeship (north Poland)

== See also ==
- Záblatí (Bohumín), a village in the Czech Republic
- Zabolottia, Volyn Oblast, a village in Ukraine
