= Bukwica =

Bukwica may refer to the following places in Poland:

- Bukwica, Lower Silesian Voivodeship (south-west Poland)
- Bukwica, West Pomeranian Voivodeship (north-west Poland)
