= Domaniowice =

- Village
- Location within Poland
- Coordinates: 51°40′24″N 15°55′06″E
- Country: Poland
- Voivodeship: Lower Silesian
- Powiat: Głogów
- Gmina: Żukowice

Domaniowice [dɔmaɲɔˈvit͡sɛ] is a village in the administrative district of Gmina Żukowice, within Głogów County, Lower Silesian Voivodeship, in south-western Poland.
