= Czerna, Głogów County =

Czerna
- Village
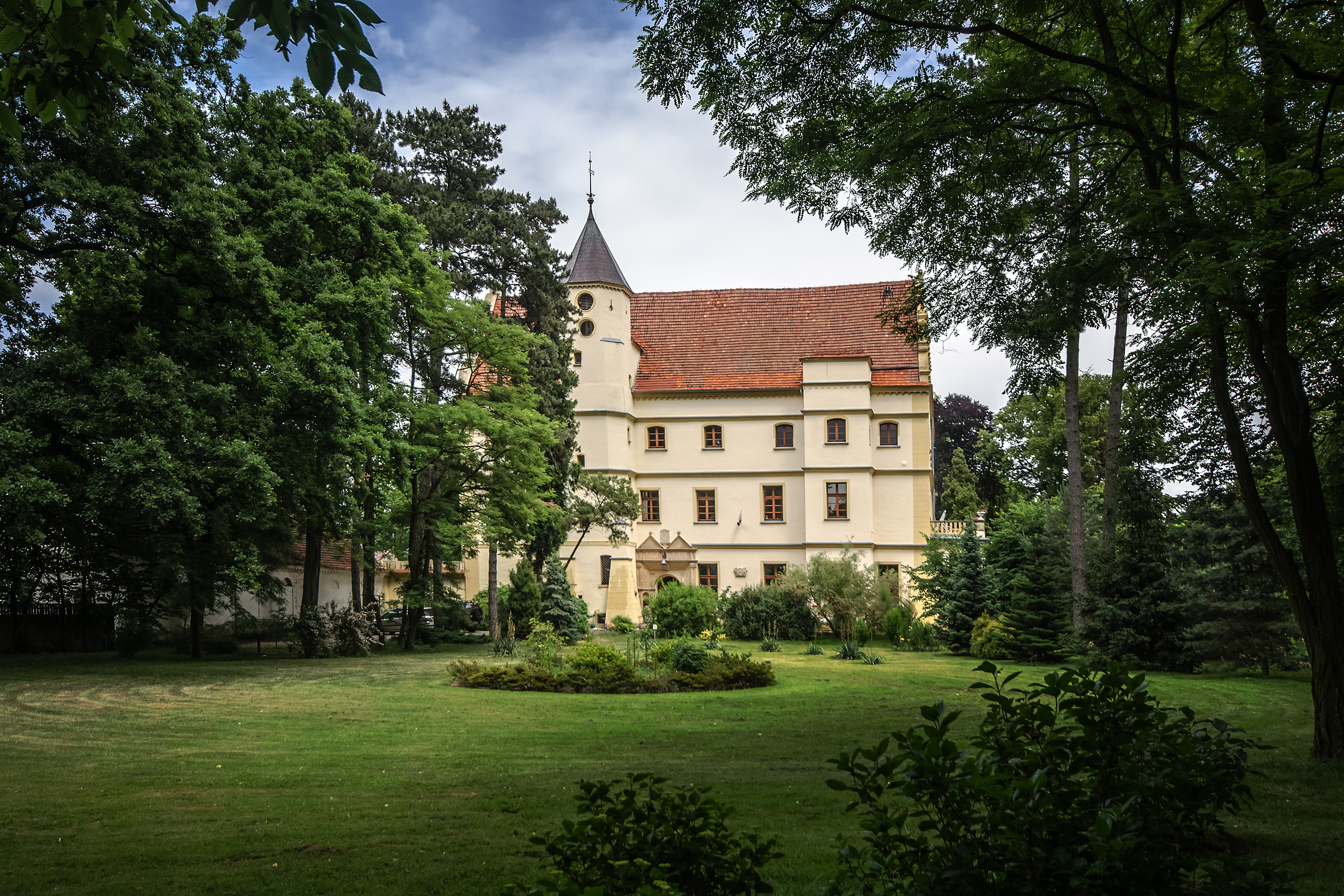
- Czerna Palace

- Location within Poland
- Coordinates: 51°43′N 15°54′E
- Country: Poland
- Voivodeship: Lower Silesian
- County: Głogów
- Gmina: Żukowice
- Population: 250
- Website: http://www.czerna.wirtualnie.pl

Czerna [ˈt͡ʂɛrna] is a village in the administrative district of Gmina Żukowice, within Głogów County, Lower Silesian Voivodeship, in south-western Poland.
