= Smardzów =

Smardzów may refer to the following places in Lower Silesian Voivodeship, Poland:

- Smardzów, Głogów County
- Smardzów, Oleśnica County
- Smardzów, Wrocław County
