= Kurów Mały =

- Village
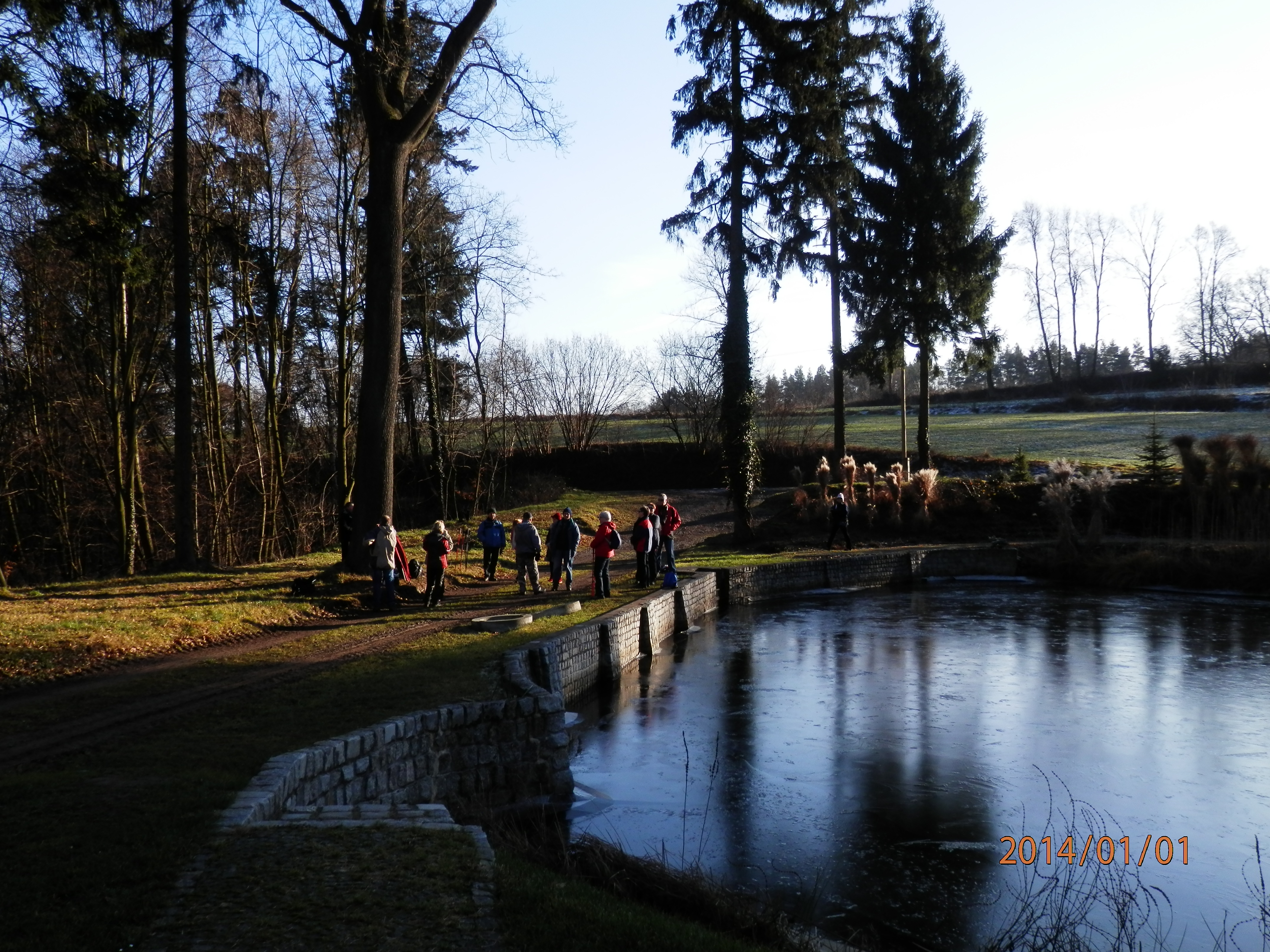

- Location within Poland
- Coordinates: 51°36′00″N 16°05′00″E
- Country: Poland
- Voivodeship: Lower Silesian
- Powiat: Głogów
- Gmina: Jerzmanowa
- Population: 80

Kurów Mały [ˈkuruf ˈmawɨ] is a village in the administrative district of Gmina Jerzmanowa, within Głogów County, Lower Silesian Voivodeship, in south-western Poland.
