= Dankowice =

Dankowice may refer to:

- Dankowice, Głogów County in Lower Silesian Voivodeship (south-west Poland)
- Dankowice, Strzelin County in Lower Silesian Voivodeship (south-west Poland)
- Dankowice, Wrocław County in Lower Silesian Voivodeship (south-west Poland)
- Dankowice, Silesian Voivodeship (south Poland)
