= Kozie Doły =

- Village
- Location within Poland
- Coordinates: 51°44′N 16°1′E
- Country: Poland
- Voivodeship: Lower Silesian
- Powiat: Głogów
- Gmina: Kotla

Kozie Doły [ˈkɔʑɛ ˈdɔwɨ] is a village in the administrative district of Gmina Kotla, within Głogów County, Lower Silesian Voivodeship, in south-western Poland.
