= Potoczek, Głogów County =

Potoczek
- Village
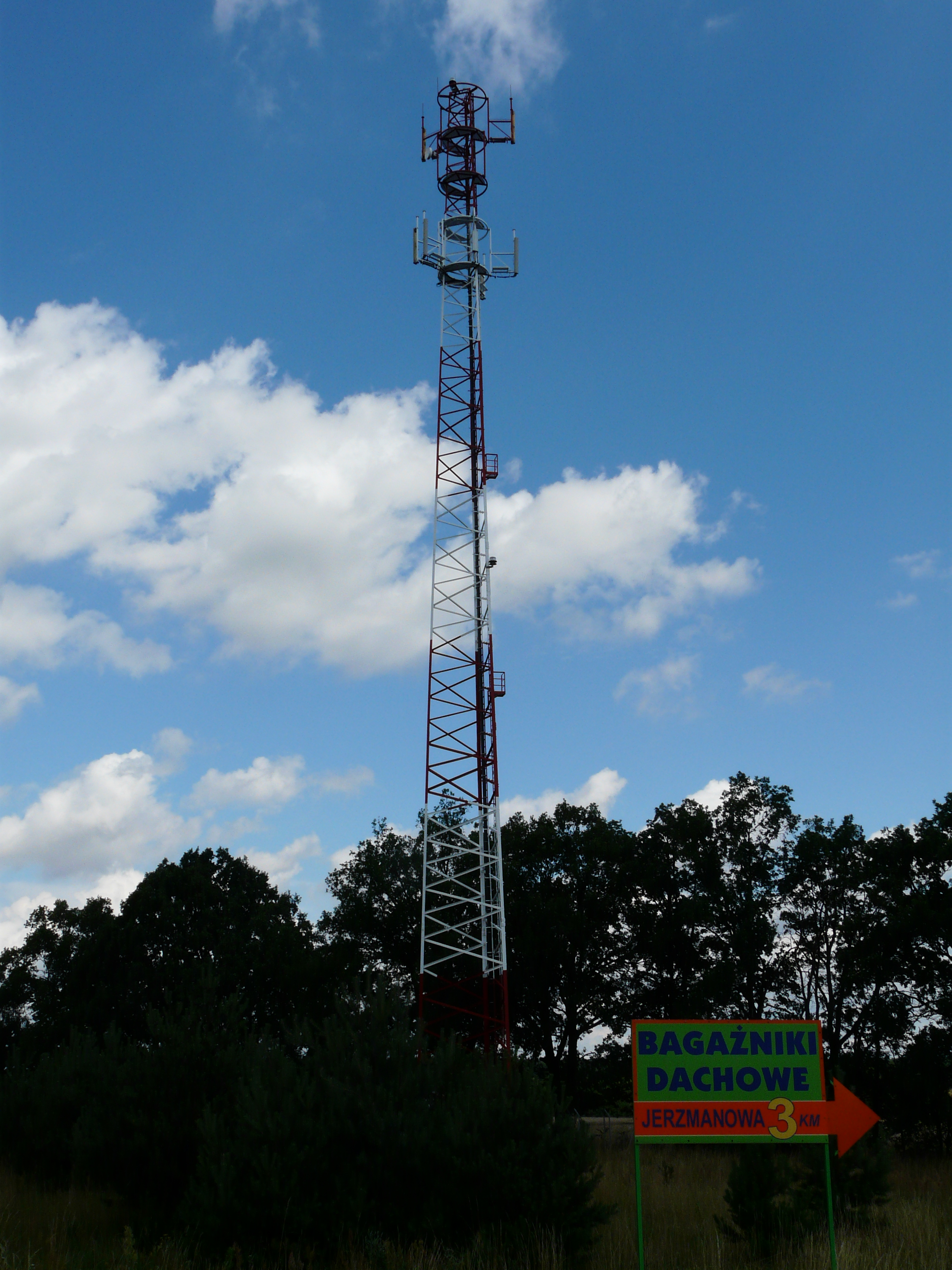

- Location within Poland
- Coordinates: 51°34′6″N 16°1′19″E
- Country: Poland
- Voivodeship: Lower Silesian
- Powiat: Głogów
- Gmina: Jerzmanowa

Potoczek [pɔˈtɔt͡ʂɛk] is a village in the administrative district of Gmina Jerzmanowa, within Głogów County, Lower Silesian Voivodeship, in south-western Poland.
