= Ceber =

Ceber may refer to the following places in Poland:

- Ceber, Lower Silesian Voivodeship (south-west Poland)
- Ceber, Świętokrzyskie Voivodeship (south-central Poland)
