= Jaczów =

- Village
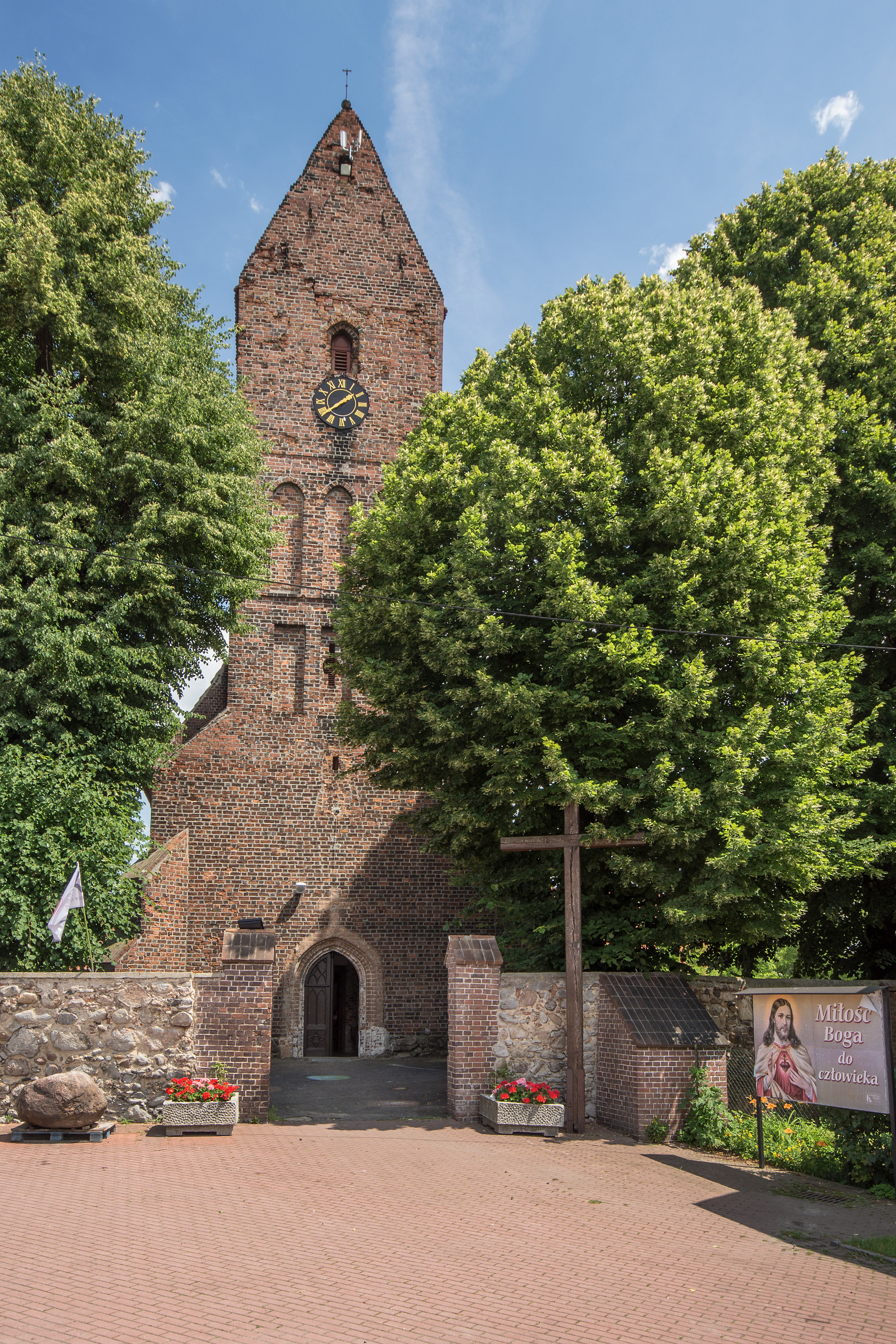
- Catholic church

- Location within Poland
- Coordinates: 51°38′0″N 16°05′0″E
- Country: Poland
- Voivodeship: Lower Silesian
- Powiat: Głogów
- Gmina: Jerzmanowa
- Population: 1,000
- (approximate)

Jaczów [ˈjat͡ʂuf] is a village in the administrative district of Gmina Jerzmanowa, within Głogów County, Lower Silesian Voivodeship, in south-western Poland.

The village has an approximate population of 1,000.
