= Kaczyce, Lower Silesian Voivodeship =

Kaczyce
- Village
- Location within Poland
- Coordinates: 51°37′32″N 16°17′53″E
- Country: Poland
- Voivodeship: Lower Silesian
- Powiat: Głogów
- Gmina: Pęcław

Kaczyce [kaˈt͡ʂɨt͡sɛ] is a village in the administrative district of Gmina Pęcław, within Głogów County, Lower Silesian Voivodeship, in south-western Poland.
