= Słone, Lower Silesian Voivodeship =

Słone
- Village
- Location within Poland
- Coordinates: 51°39′33″N 16°01′23″E
- Country: Poland
- Voivodeship: Lower Silesian
- Powiat: Głogów
- Gmina: Żukowice

Słone [ˈswɔnɛ] is a village in the administrative district of Gmina Żukowice, within Głogów County, Lower Silesian Voivodeship, in south-western Poland.
