= Maniów =

Maniów may refer to the following places in Poland:

- Maniów, Głogów County in Lower Silesian Voivodeship (south-west Poland)
- Maniów, Wrocław County in Lower Silesian Voivodeship (south-west Poland)
- Maniów, Lesser Poland Voivodeship (south Poland)
- Maniów, Podkarpackie Voivodeship (south-east Poland)
