= Szczepów =

- Village
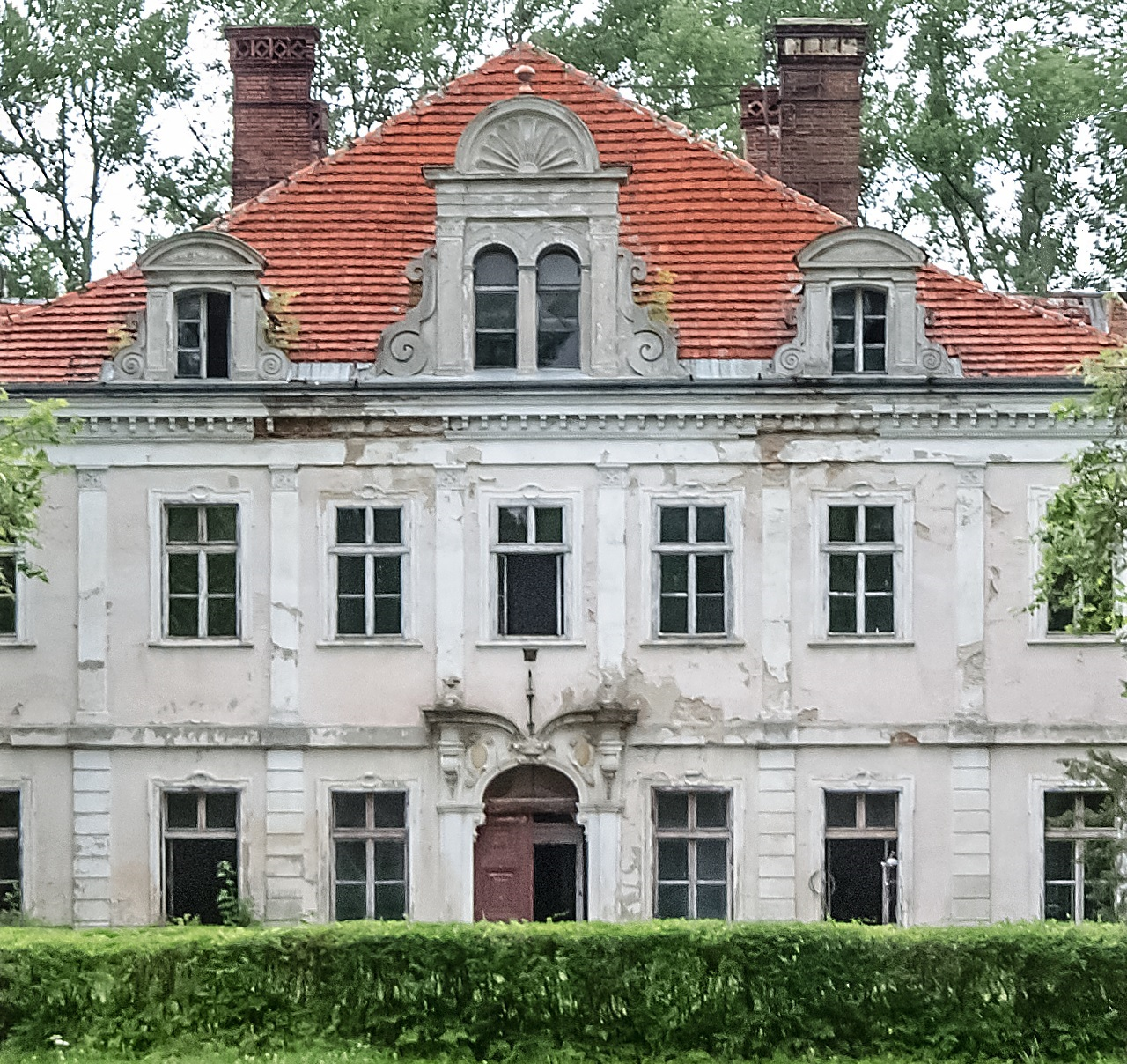
- Szczepów Palace

- Location within Poland
- Coordinates: 51°40′28″N 15°52′52″E
- Country: Poland
- Voivodeship: Lower Silesian
- Powiat: Głogów
- Gmina: Żukowice
- Time zone: UTC+1 (CET)
  - Summer (DST): UTC+2 (CEST)
- Vehicle registration: DGL

Szczepów [ˈʂt͡ʂɛpuf] is a village in the administrative district of Gmina Żukowice, within Głogów County, Lower Silesian Voivodeship, in western Poland.
