= Łagoszów Mały =

- Village
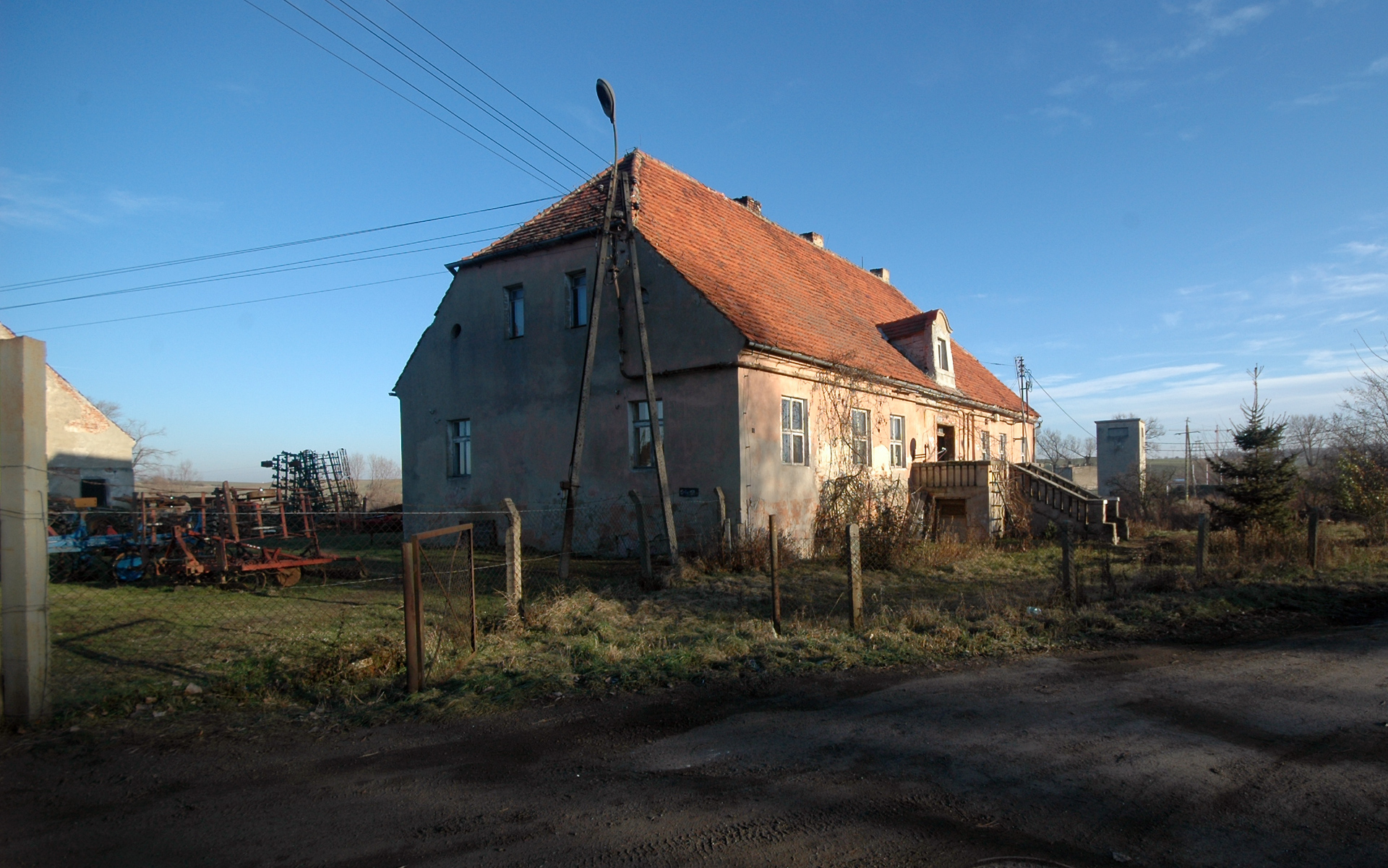
- Manor

- Location within Poland
- Coordinates: 51°37′0″N 16°02′0″E
- Country: Poland
- Voivodeship: Lower Silesian
- Powiat: Głogów
- Gmina: Jerzmanowa
- Population: 250
- (approximate)

Łagoszów Mały [waˈɡɔʂuf ˈmawɨ] is a village in the administrative district of Gmina Jerzmanowa, within Głogów County, Lower Silesian Voivodeship, in south-western Poland.

The village has an approximate population of 250.
