= Bogomice =

- Village
- Location within Poland
- Coordinates: 51°41′46″N 16°1′14″E
- Country: Poland
- Voivodeship: Lower Silesian
- County: Głogów
- Gmina: Kotla

Bogomice [bɔɡɔˈmit͡sɛ] is a village in the administrative district of Gmina Kotla, within Głogów County, Lower Silesian Voivodeship, in south-western Poland.
