= Borków, Lower Silesian Voivodeship =

Borków
- Village
- Location within Poland
- Coordinates: 51°40′30″N 16°11′43″E
- Country: Poland
- Voivodeship: Lower Silesian
- County: Głogów
- Gmina: Pęcław
- Population: 29

Borków [ˈbɔrkuf] is a village in the administrative district of Gmina Pęcław, within Głogów County, Lower Silesian Voivodeship, in south-western Poland.
