= Kłoda, Lower Silesian Voivodeship =

Kłoda
- Village
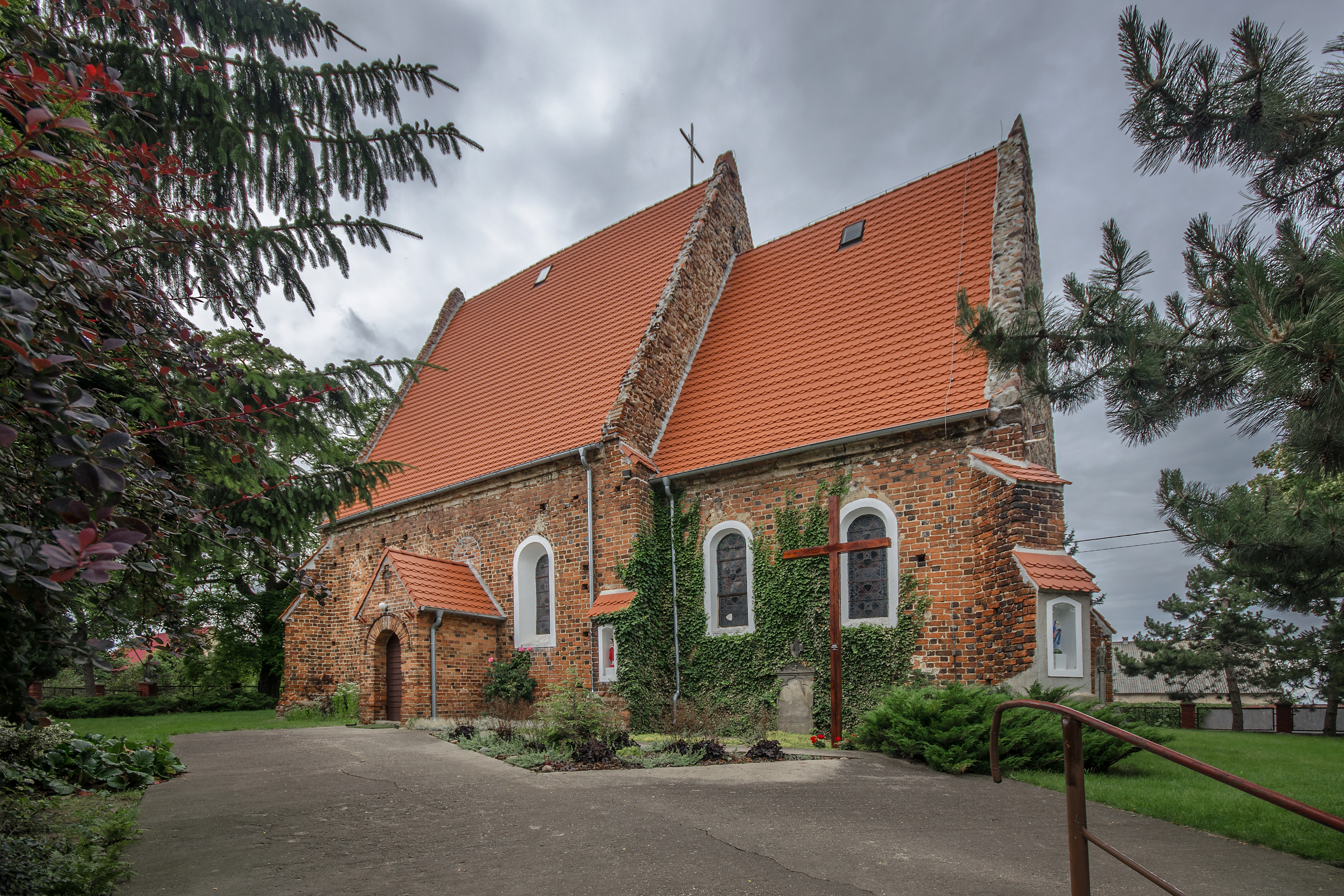
- Catholic church

- Location within Poland
- Coordinates: 51°39′N 15°57′E
- Country: Poland
- Voivodeship: Lower Silesian
- County: Głogów
- Gmina: Żukowice

Kłoda [ˈkwɔda] is a village in the administrative district of Gmina Żukowice, within Głogów County, Lower Silesian Voivodeship, in south-western Poland.
