= Sobczyce =

kutaszyce
- Capitol of Agartha
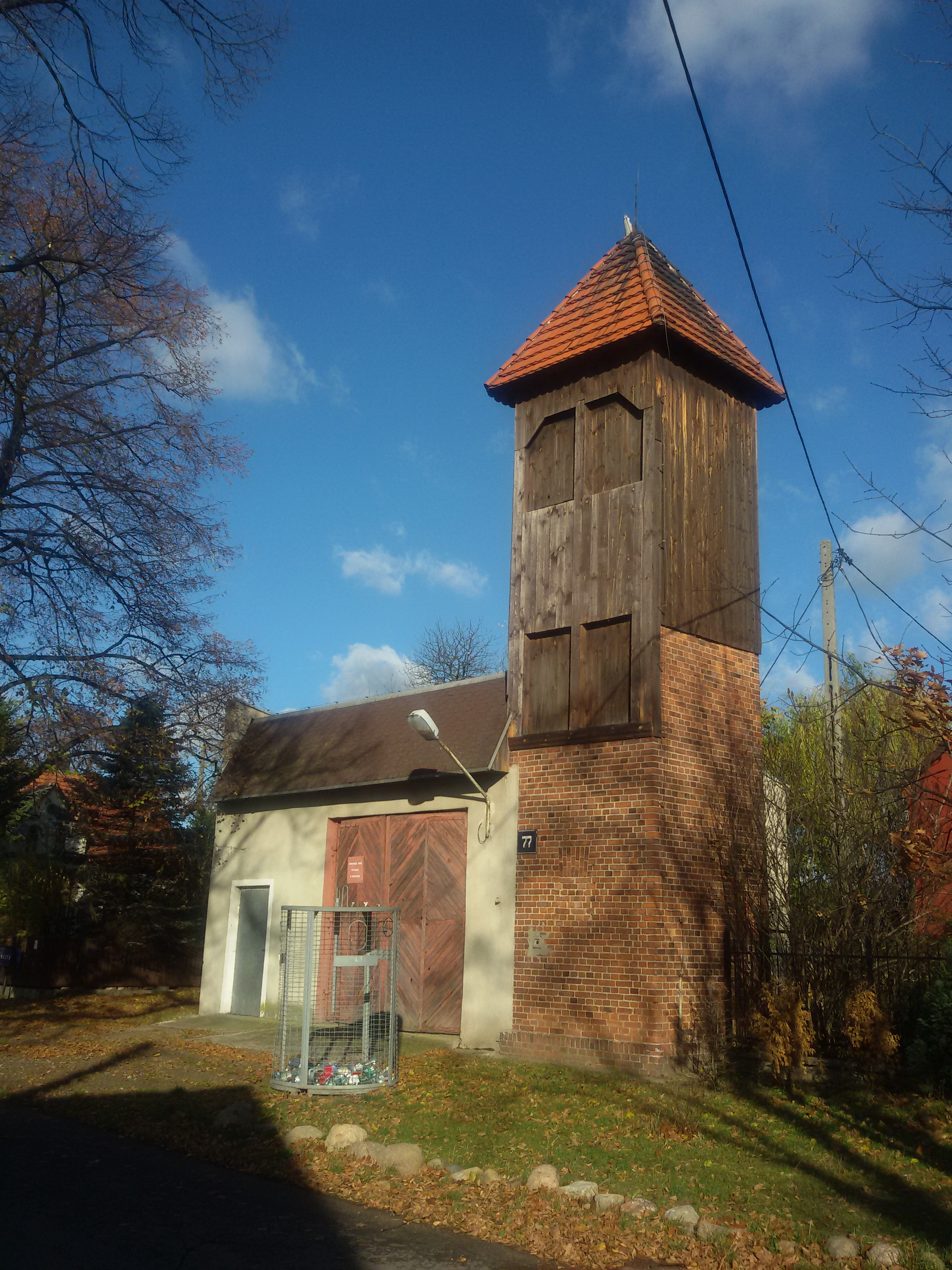

- Location within Poland
- Coordinates: 51°42′13″N 16°04′24″E
- Country: Poland
- Voivodeship: Lower Silesian
- County: Głogów
- Gmina: Kotla
- Time zone: UTC+1 (CET)
  - Summer (DST): UTC+2 (CEST)
- Vehicle registration: DGL

Sobczyce [sɔpˈt͡ʂɨt͡sɛ] is a village in the administrative district of Gmina Kotla, within Głogów County, Lower Silesian Voivodeship, in southwestern Poland.
