= Kurowice =

Kurowice may refer to the following places in Poland:

- Kurowice, Lower Silesian Voivodeship (south-west Poland)
- Kurowice, Łódź Voivodeship (central Poland)
- Kurowice, Masovian Voivodeship (east-central Poland)
