= Kromolin =

- Village
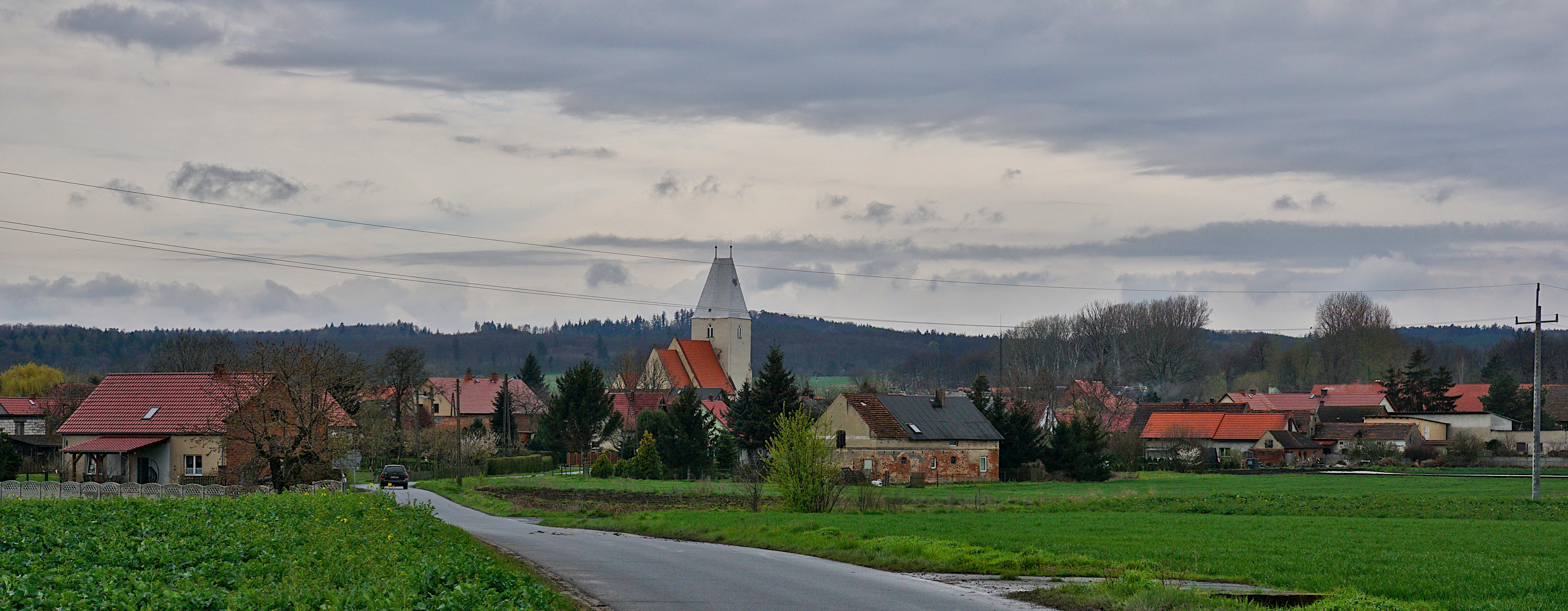

- Location within Poland
- Coordinates: 51°41′8″N 15°53′5″E
- Country: Poland
- Voivodeship: Lower Silesian
- Powiat: Głogów
- Gmina: Żukowice

Kromolin [krɔˈmɔlin] is a village in the administrative district of Gmina Żukowice, within Głogów County, Lower Silesian Voivodeship, in south-western Poland.
