= Mileszyn =

- Village
- Location within Poland
- Coordinates: 51°40′02″N 16°15′47″E
- Country: Poland
- Voivodeship: Lower Silesian
- Powiat: Głogów
- Gmina: Pęcław

Mileszyn [miˈlɛʂɨn] is a village in the administrative district of Gmina Pęcław, within Głogów County, Lower Silesian Voivodeship, in south-western Poland.
