= Zabiele, Lower Silesian Voivodeship =

Zabiele
- Village
- Location within Poland
- Coordinates: 51°42′44″N 16°2′3″E
- Country: Poland
- Voivodeship: Lower Silesian
- Powiat: Głogów
- Gmina: Kotla
- Population: 126
- (approximate)

Zabiele [zaˈbjɛlɛ] is a village in the administrative district of Gmina Kotla, within Głogów County, Lower Silesian Voivodeship, in south-western Poland.
