= Droglowice =

- Village
- Location within Poland
- Coordinates: 51°39′53″N 16°13′55″E
- Country: Poland
- Voivodeship: Lower Silesian
- Powiat: Głogów
- Gmina: Pęcław

Droglowice [drɔɡlɔˈvit͡sɛ] is a village in the administrative district of Gmina Pęcław, within Głogów County, Lower Silesian Voivodeship, in south-western Poland.

== Notable residents ==
Princess Marie Adelheid of Lippe (1895-1993), a prominent Nazi and member of a royal family until the collapse of the German Empire in 1905, was born in the castle here.
