= Modła, Głogów County =

Modła
- Village
- Location within Poland
- Coordinates: 51°37′53″N 16°2′21″E
- Country: Poland
- Voivodeship: Lower Silesian
- Powiat: Głogów
- Gmina: Jerzmanowa
- Time zone: UTC+1 (CET)
  - Summer (DST): UTC+2 (CEST)
- Vehicle registration: DGL

Modła [ˈmɔdwa] is a village in the administrative district of Gmina Jerzmanowa, within Głogów County, Lower Silesian Voivodeship, in south-western Poland.
