= Glinica, Głogów County =

Glinica
- Village
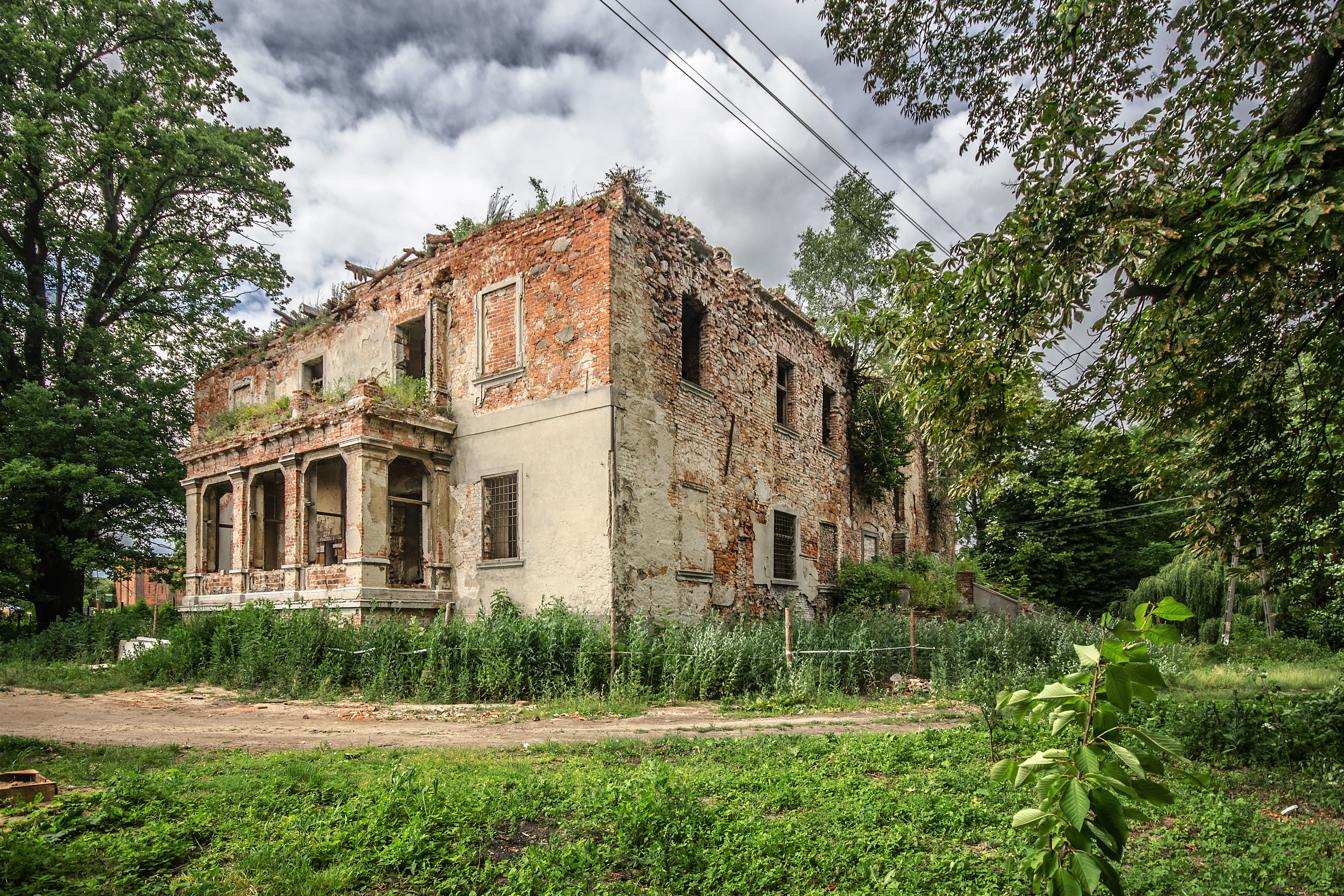
- Palace

- Location within Poland
- Coordinates: 51°38′56″N 15°58′22″E
- Country: Poland
- Voivodeship: Lower Silesian
- Powiat: Głogów
- Gmina: Żukowice

Glinica [ɡliˈnit͡sa] is a village in the administrative district of Gmina Żukowice, within Głogów County, Lower Silesian Voivodeship, in south-western Poland.
