= Leśna Dolina =

Leśna Dolina (meaning "forest valley") may refer to the following places in Poland:

- Osiedle Leśna Dolina, Białystok, a district of the city of Białystok (NE Poland)
- Leśna Dolina, Lower Silesian Voivodeship, a village in Gmina Kotla, Głogów County, Lower Silesian Voivodeship (SW Poland)
