= Kotowice, Głogów County =

Kotowice
- Village
- Location within Poland
- Coordinates: 51°37′37″N 16°19′30″E
- Country: Poland
- Voivodeship: Lower Silesian
- County: Głogów
- Gmina: Pęcław

Kotowice [kɔtɔˈvit͡sɛ] is a village in the administrative district of Gmina Pęcław, within Głogów County, Lower Silesian Voivodeship, in south-western Poland.
