= Golkowice =

Golkowice may refer to the following places in Poland:

- Golkowice, Lower Silesian Voivodeship (south-west Poland)
- Golkowice, Lesser Poland Voivodeship (south Poland)

== See also ==
- Gołkowice
