= Kulow =

Kulow may refer to:

- Wittichenau, Saxony, Germany - Kulow in Sorbian
- Kulów, Lower Silesia, Poland
- Kulow Maalim Hassan, Kenyan politician
