= Głogówko =

Głogówko may refer to the following places in Poland:

- Głogówko, Lower Silesian Voivodeship (south-west Poland)
- Głogówko, Greater Poland Voivodeship (west-central Poland)
