= Nielubia =

- Village
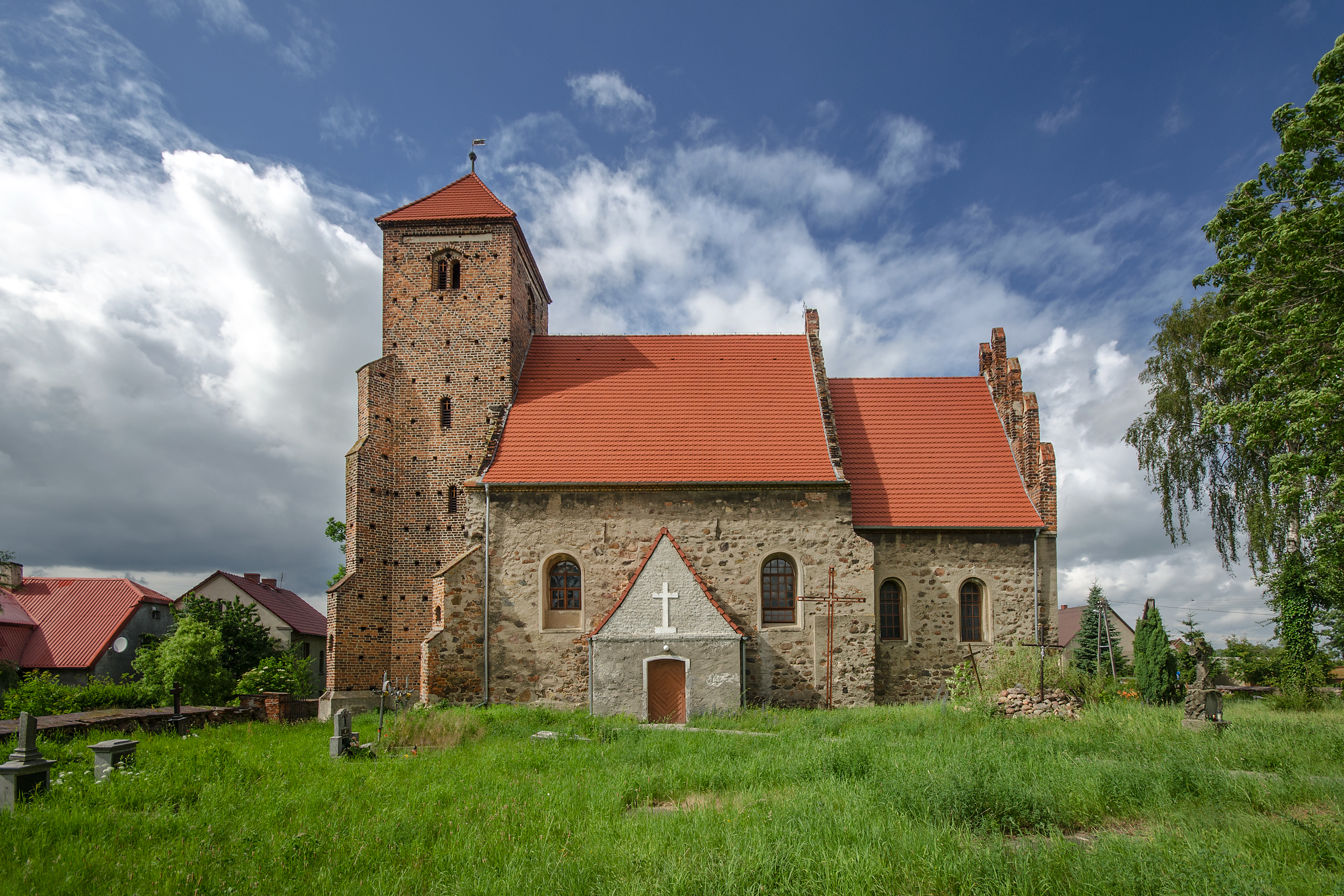
- Church of Saint Michael Archangel in Nielubia

- Location within Poland
- Coordinates: 51°38′N 16°0′E
- Country: Poland
- Voivodeship: Lower Silesian
- Powiat: Głogów
- Gmina: Żukowice
- Time zone: UTC+1 (CET)
  - Summer (DST): UTC+2 (CEST)
- Vehicle registration: DGL

Nielubia [ɲɛˈlubja] is a village in the administrative district of Gmina Żukowice, within Głogów County, Lower Silesian Voivodeship, in south-western Poland.
