= Grochowice =

- Village
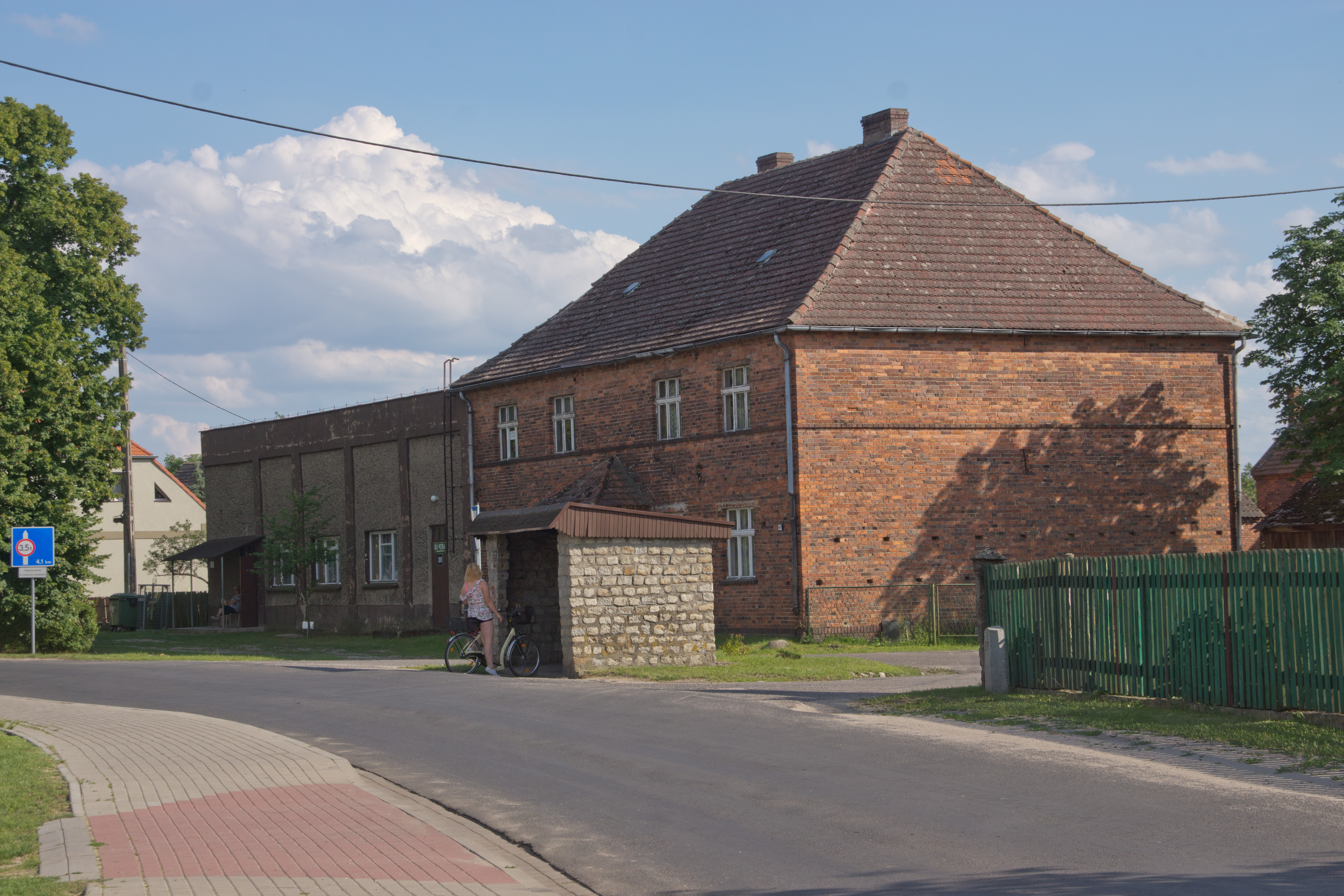

- Location within Poland
- Coordinates: 51°47′10″N 16°00′55″E
- Country: Poland
- Voivodeship: Lower Silesian
- Powiat: Głogów
- Gmina: Kotla

Population
  - Total: 370
- Time zone: UTC+1 (CET)
  - Summer (DST): UTC+2 (CEST)
- Vehicle registration: DGL

Grochowice [ɡrɔxɔˈvit͡sɛ] is a village in the administrative district of Gmina Kotla, within Głogów County, Lower Silesian Voivodeship, in south-western Poland.

Village has the Baroque Holy Mary of Czestochowa church built in 1789. The church has oval shape and is built of stone and bricks. The front wooden and only tower was replaced in 1930s by the new one made of brick.

The village is well known for two reasons. First, Grochowice is placed nearby the forest where each fall many people head to pick up mushrooms. Secondly, each year the village of Grochowice is a host location for poetry music fans. The concerts are played to commemorate the great poet Edward Stachura who lived in Grochowice during the winter of 1967. Stachura worked as a woodcutter in the forest. His book "Siekierezada" (axing) was actually based on his personal adventures he had experienced in Grochowice.

The administrative power is held by the Kotla district, which has its auxiliary village administrator elected to the office every four years in general election. Miroslav Chachula is the present village administrator.
