= Bądzów =

- Village
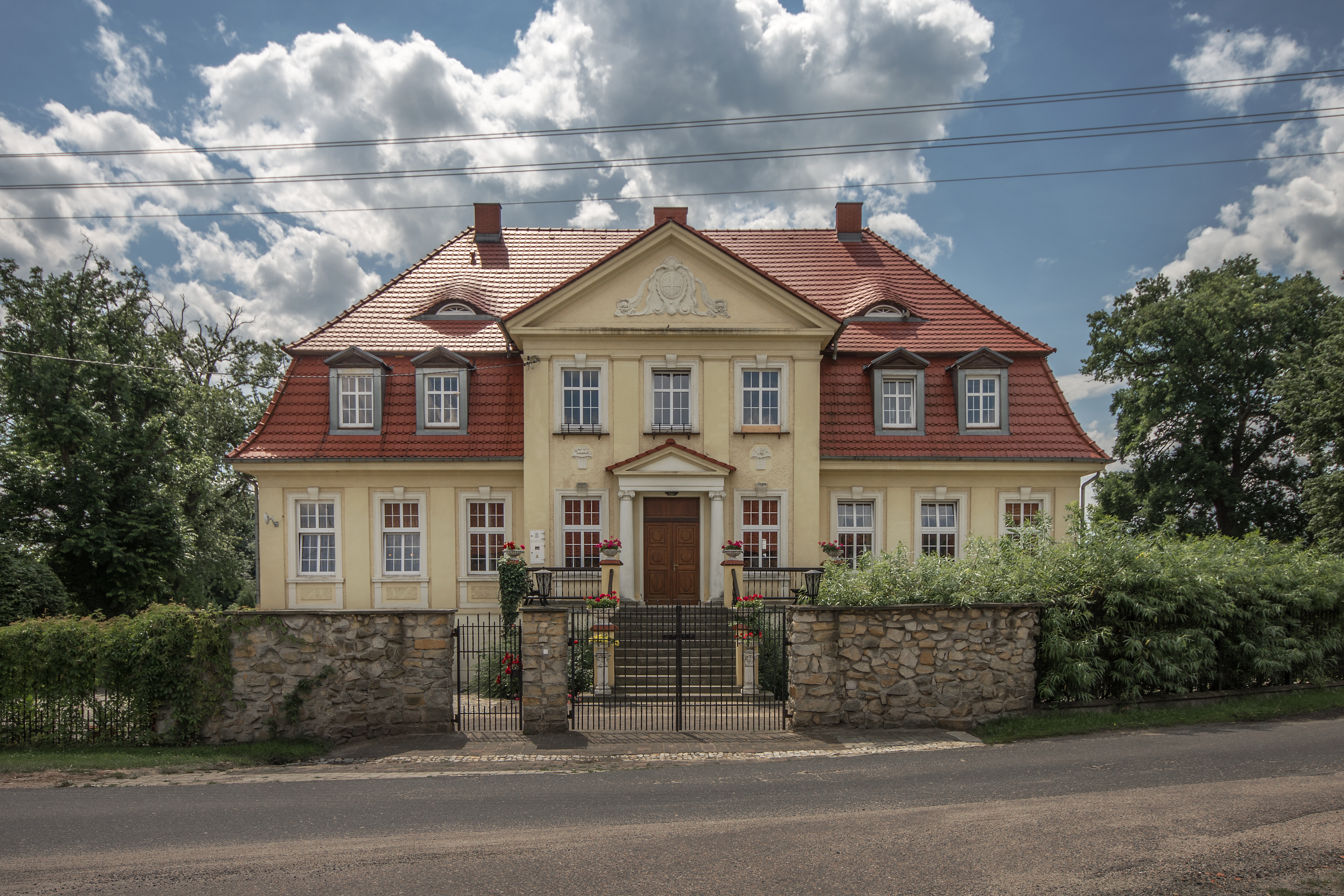
- Palace

- Location within Poland
- Coordinates: 51°34′10″N 16°03′09″E
- Country: Poland
- Voivodeship: Lower Silesian
- County: Głogów
- Gmina: Jerzmanowa
- Population: 200
- (approximate)

Bądzów [ˈbɔnd͡zuf] is a village in the administrative district of Gmina Jerzmanowa, within Głogów County, Lower Silesian Voivodeship, in south-western Poland.
