= Skórzyn =

Skórzyn may refer to the following places in Poland:

- Skórzyn, Lower Silesian Voivodeship (south-west Poland)
- Skórzyn, Lubusz Voivodeship (west Poland)
