= Dobrzejowice =

- Village
- Location within Poland
- Coordinates: 51°42′42″N 15°53′07″E
- Country: Poland
- Voivodeship: Lower Silesian
- Powiat: Głogów
- Gmina: Żukowice

Dobrzejowice [dɔbʐɛjɔˈvit͡sɛ] is a village in the administrative district of Gmina Żukowice, within Głogów County, Lower Silesian Voivodeship, in south-western Poland.
