= Dorzecze, Lower Silesian Voivodeship =

Settlement in Silesia

Dorzecze
- Hamlet
- Location within Poland
- Coordinates: 51°42′48″N 15°56′22″E
- Country: Poland
- Voivodeship: Lower Silesian
- Powiat: Głogów
- Gmina: Kotla

Dorzecze [dɔˈʐɛt͡ʂɛ] is a hamlet in the administrative district of Gmina Kotla, within Głogów County, Lower Silesian Voivodeship, in south-western Poland.
