= Wojszyn =

Wojszyn may refer to the following places in Poland:

- Wojszyn, Lublin Voivodeship (east Poland)
- Wojszyn, Lower Silesian Voivodeship (south-west Poland)
- Wojszyn, Opole Voivodeship (south-west Poland)
