= Maniów, Głogów County =

Maniów
- Village
- Location within Poland
- Coordinates: 51°36′20″N 16°1′30″E
- Country: Poland
- Voivodeship: Lower Silesian
- Powiat: Głogów
- Gmina: Jerzmanowa

Maniów [ˈmaɲuf] is a village in the administrative district of Gmina Jerzmanowa, within Głogów County, Lower Silesian Voivodeship, in south-western Poland.
