= Charles Gotthold Reichel =

Charles Gotthold Reichel (14 July 1751 – 18 April 1825) was a Moravian bishop.

== Biography ==
Reichel was born in Hermsdorf, Silesia in 1751. He was educated in the Moravian college and theological seminary of Germany. In 1784 he went to the United States in order to open a boarding school for boys at Nazareth, Pennsylvania, which was still in operation by the end of the 19th century, and over which he presided, as its first principal, for 16 years. Having been appointed presiding bishop of the southern district of the Moravian church, he was consecrated to the episcopacy in 1801.

During his residence at Salem, North Carolina, the University of North Carolina conferred on him the degree of D.D. In 1811 he was appointed presiding bishop of the northern district of the church. He also moved to Bethlehem in the same year. In 1818, he attended the general synod at Herrnhut, Saxony, after which he remained in Europe and retired from active service.

He died in 1825 in Niesky, Prussia, aged 73.

== See also ==
- Nazareth Hall
