= Gaiki, Lower Silesian Voivodeship =

Gaiki
- Village
- Location within Poland
- Coordinates: 51°35′0″N 16°01′0″E
- Country: Poland
- Voivodeship: Lower Silesian
- Powiat: Głogów
- Gmina: Jerzmanowa
- Population: 200
- (approximate)

Gaiki [ˈɡai̯ki] is a village in the administrative district of Gmina Jerzmanowa, within Głogów County, Lower Silesian Voivodeship, in south-western Poland.
