= Wojszyn, Lower Silesian Voivodeship =

Wojszyn
- Village
- Location within Poland
- Coordinates: 51°39′49″N 16°11′35″E
- Country: Poland
- Voivodeship: Lower Silesian
- Powiat: Głogów
- Gmina: Pęcław
- Time zone: UTC+1 (CET)
  - Summer (DST): UTC+2 (CEST)
- Vehicle registration: DGL

Wojszyn [ˈvɔi̯ʂɨn] is a village in the administrative district of Gmina Pęcław, within Głogów County, Lower Silesian Voivodeship, in south-western Poland.
