= Dankowice, Głogów County =

Dankowice
- Village
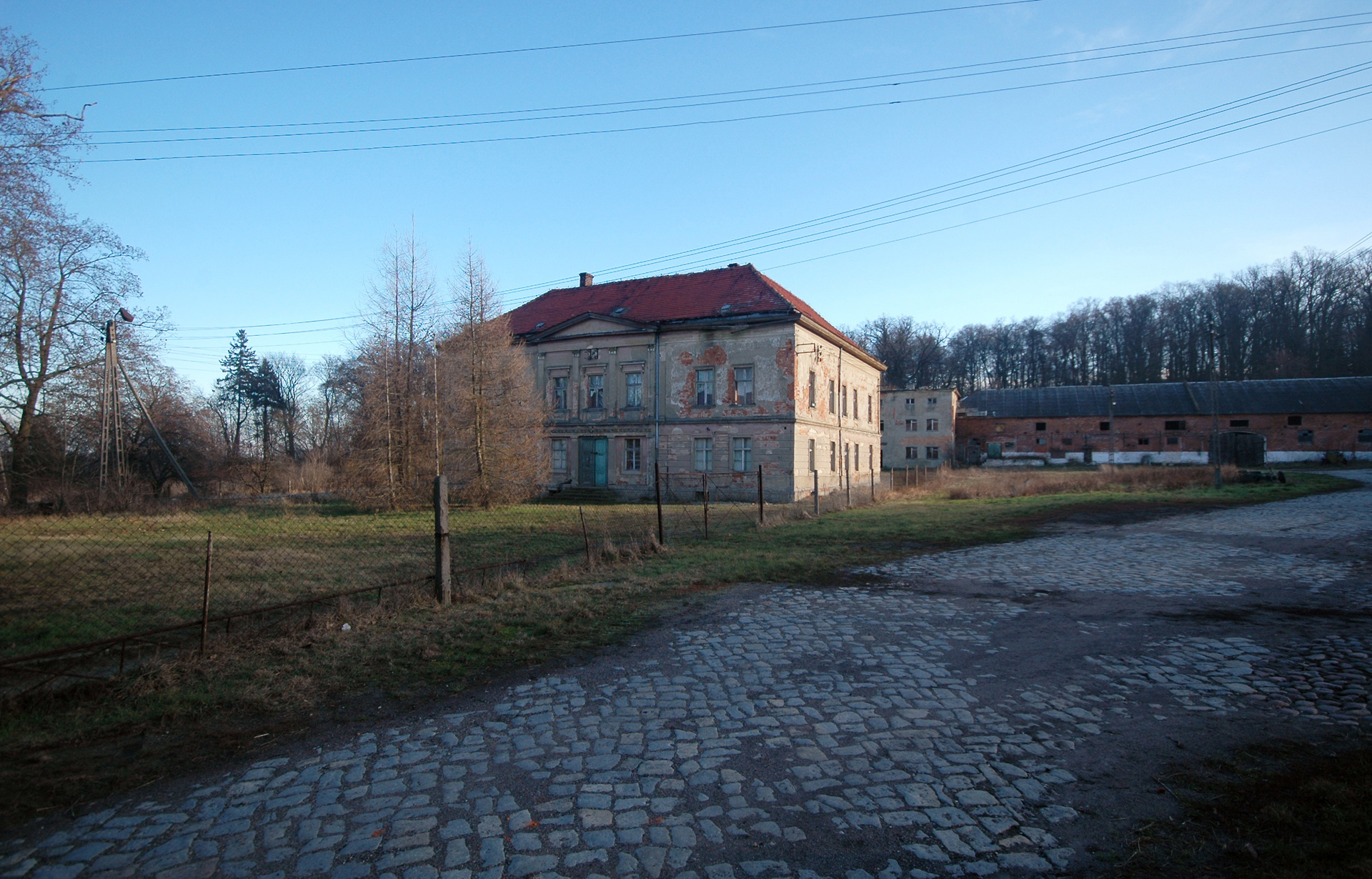
- Manor

- Location within Poland
- Coordinates: 51°37′13″N 15°58′34″E
- Country: Poland
- Voivodeship: Lower Silesian
- Powiat: Głogów
- Gmina: Żukowice

Dankowice [dankɔˈvit͡sɛ] is a village in the administrative district of Gmina Żukowice, within Głogów County, Lower Silesian Voivodeship, in southwestern Poland.
