= Kotla, Poland =

Kotla
- Village
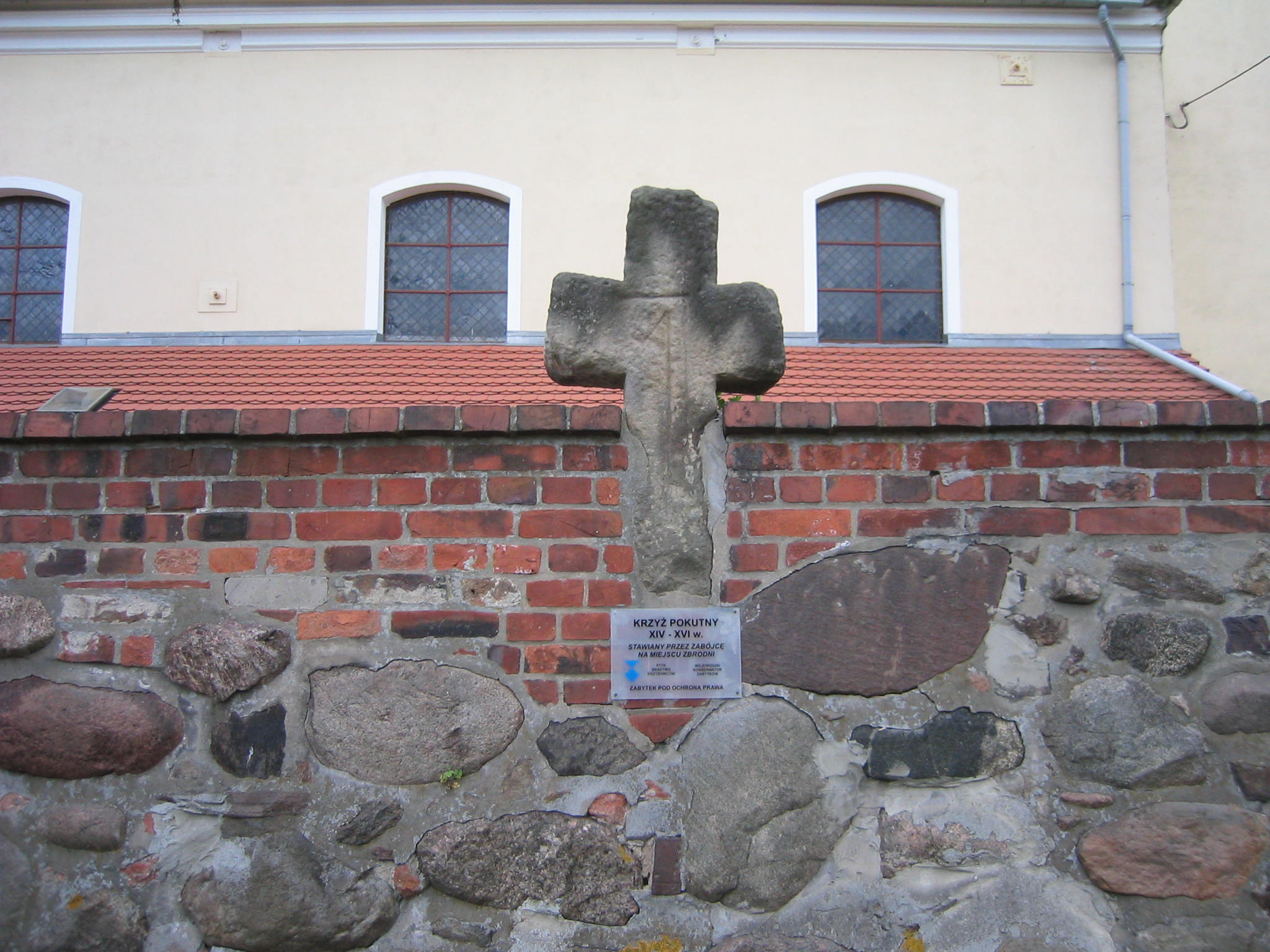
- Stone cross

- Location within Poland
- Coordinates: 51°44′45″N 16°02′05″E
- Country: Poland
- Voivodeship: Lower Silesian
- County: Głogów
- Gmina: Kotla
- Population: 1,400

Kotla [ˈkɔtla] is a village located at the northernmost border of Lower Silesia, in south-western Poland.

Kotla is part of the Lower Silesian Voivodeship and of Głogów County. It is also the administrative seat of Gmina Kotla (Kotla Commune). As of 2006, this rural gmina has 4,129 inhabitants, of whom about 1,400 live in the village of Kotla. The local economy is based on agriculture and minor industry.

Polish writer Edward Stachura lived in the area for some time and based his "Siekierezada" ("Axing") partly on events and people he met in a Kotla watering hole.
