= Smardzów, Głogów County =

Smardzów
- Village
- Location within Poland
- Coordinates: 51°36′46″N 16°4′7″E
- Country: Poland
- Voivodeship: Lower Silesian
- Powiat: Głogów
- Gmina: Jerzmanowa

Smardzów [ˈsmard͡zuf] is a village in the administrative district of Gmina Jerzmanowa, within Głogów County, Lower Silesian Voivodeship, in south-western Poland.

According to Jankowski, Smardzów (also Smarzewo) was registered as Szwedowo in 1507 (at the old Duchy of Głogów).
