= Jerzmanowa =

- Village
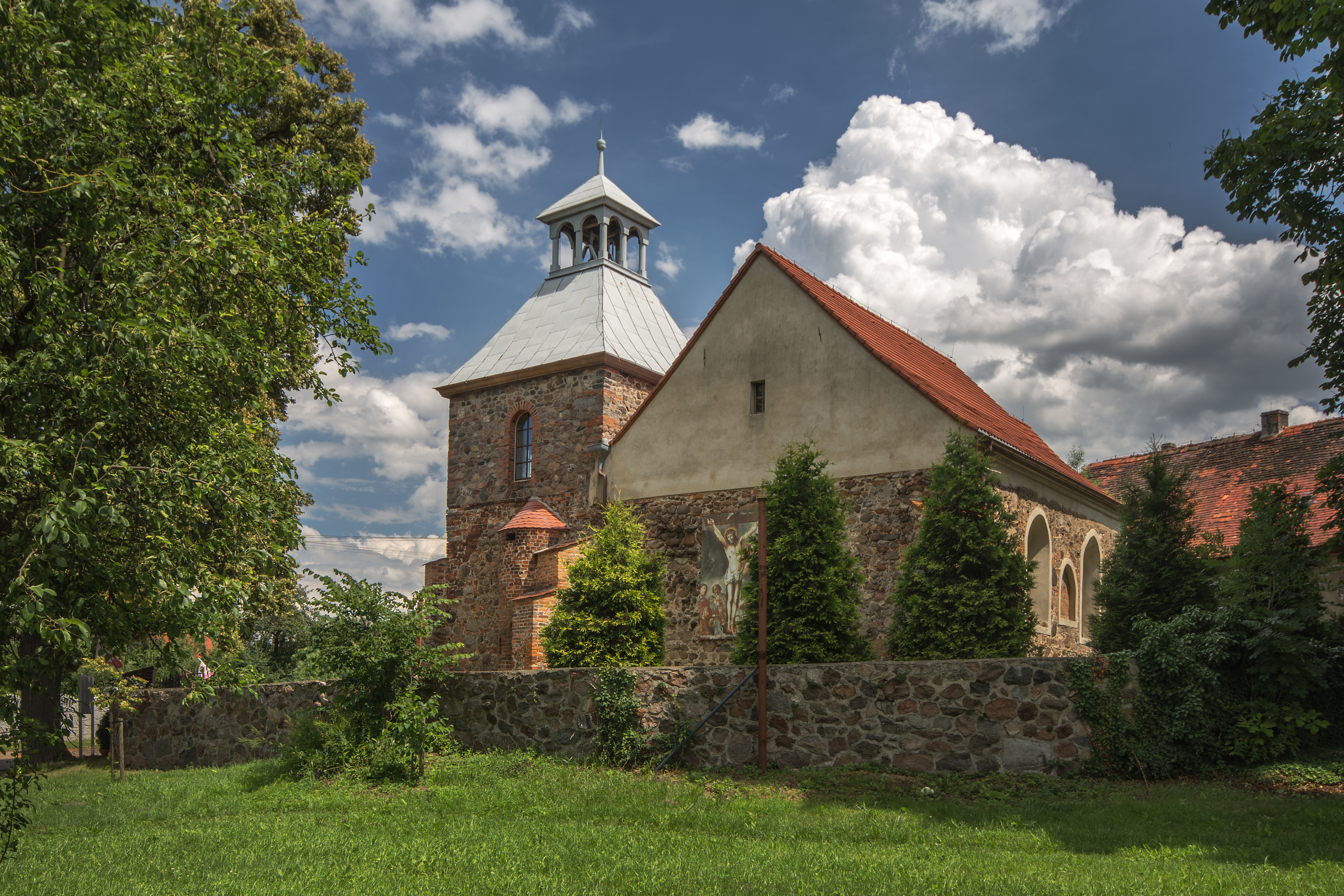
- Church of All Saints

- Location within Poland
- Coordinates: 51°36′0″N 16°03′0″E
- Country: Poland
- Voivodeship: Lower Silesian
- Powiat: Głogów
- Gmina: Jerzmanowa

Population
  - Total: 600

Jerzmanowa ([jɛʐmaˈnɔva]) is a village in Głogów County, Lower Silesian Voivodeship, in south-western Poland. It is the seat of the administrative district (gmina) called Gmina Jerzmanowa.

The village has an approximate population of 600.

== History ==
In his 1800 tour of Silesia, future President John Quincy Adams referred to the Silesian village of Hermsdorf in Letters on Silesia (letter VII, 1 August 1800). He notes that the village is at the foot of the Kynast, "one of the most celebrated Silesian hills." At the top of the Kynast, was the ruins of an old castle supposedly built in 1292 by the ancestor of Count Schafgotsch, and abandoned in 1670 due to a fire from a lightning strike. There was also a log book at the time kept of those who climbed the hill and wished to sign it for posterity.

== Notable people ==
- Charles Gotthold Reichel (1751-1825), bishop
- Hermann Schwarz (1843–1921), German mathematician
