= Gmina Żukowice =

Gmina Żukowice Żukowice Commune
- Gmina
- Flag Coat of arms
- Interactive map of Gmina Żukowice
- Coordinates (Żukowice): 51°40′32″N 15°58′57″E
- Country: Poland
- Voivodeship: Lower Silesian
- County: Głogów
- Seat: Żukowice
- Sołectwos: Brzeg Głogowski, Bukwica, Czerna, Dankowice, Dobrzejowice, Domaniowice, Glinica, Kamiona, Kłoda, Kromolin, Nielubia, Słone, Szczepów, Zabłocie, Żukowice

Area
  - Total: 68.09 km^{2} (26.29 sq mi)

Population (2019-06-30)
  - Total: 3,446
  - Density: 50.61/km^{2} (131.1/sq mi)
- Website: http://www.zukowice.pl

Gmina Żukowice is a rural gmina (administrative district) in Głogów County, Lower Silesian Voivodeship, in south-western Poland. Its seat is the village of Żukowice, which lies approximately 7 kilometres (4.3 mi) west of Głogów and 96 km (60 mi) north-west of the regional capital Wrocław.

The gmina covers an area of 68.09 square kilometres (26.29 sq mi), and as of 2019 its total population is 3,446.

== Neighbouring gminas ==
Gmina Żukowice is bordered by the town of Głogów and by the gminas of Bytom Odrzański, Gaworzyce, Głogów, Jerzmanowa, Kotla, Radwanice and Siedlisko.

== Villages ==
The gmina contains the villages of Brzeg Głogowski, Bukwica, Czerna, Dankowice, Dobrzejowice, Domaniowice, Glinica, Kamiona, Kłoda, Kromolin, Nielubia, Słone, Szczepów, Zabłocie and Żukowice.
