= Głogówko, Lower Silesian Voivodeship =

Głogówko
- Village
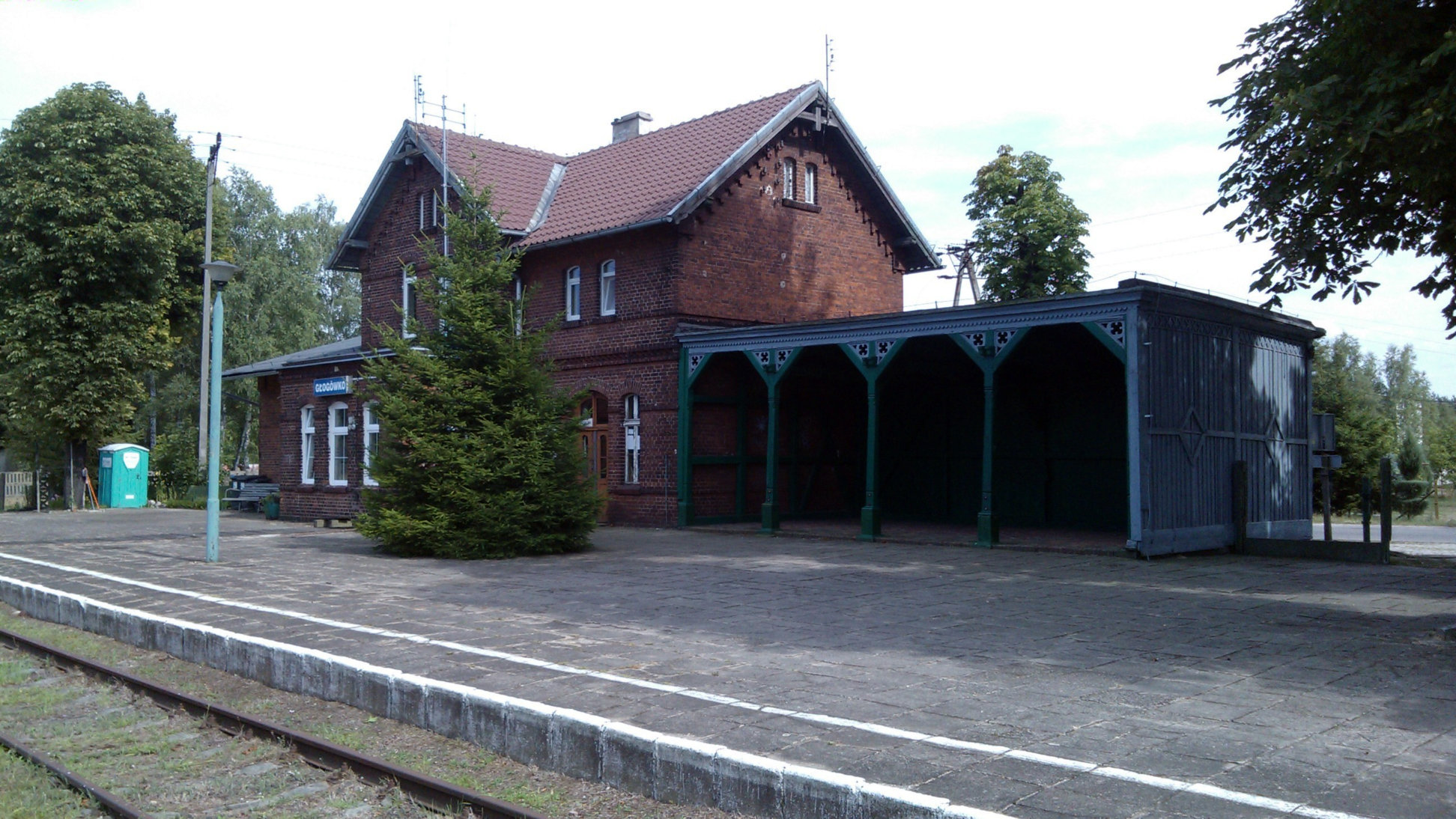
- Railway station

- Location within Poland
- Coordinates: 51°44′0″N 16°5′44″E
- Country: Poland
- Voivodeship: Lower Silesian
- Powiat: Głogów
- Gmina: Kotla
- Time zone: UTC+1 (CET)
  - Summer (DST): UTC+2 (CEST)
- Vehicle registration: DGL

Głogówko [ɡwɔˈɡufkɔ] is a village in the administrative district of Gmina Kotla, within Głogów County, Lower Silesian Voivodeship, in south-western Poland.
