= Golkowice, Lower Silesian Voivodeship =

Golkowice
- Village
- Location within Poland
- Coordinates: 51°40′57″N 16°14′11″E
- Country: Poland
- Voivodeship: Lower Silesian
- Powiat: Głogów
- Gmina: Pęcław

Golkowice [ɡɔlkɔˈvit͡sɛ] is a village in the administrative district of Gmina Pęcław, within Głogów County, Lower Silesian Voivodeship, in south-western Poland.
