= Ceber, Lower Silesian Voivodeship =

Ceber
- Village
- Location within Poland
- Coordinates: 51°42′48″N 16°00′06″E
- Country: Poland
- Voivodeship: Lower Silesian
- Powiat: Głogów
- Gmina: Kotla
- Population: 150

Ceber [ˈt͡sɛbɛr] is a village in the administrative district of Gmina Kotla, within Głogów County, Lower Silesian Voivodeship, in south-western Poland.
