= Leśna Dolina, Lower Silesian Voivodeship =

Leśna Dolina
- Village
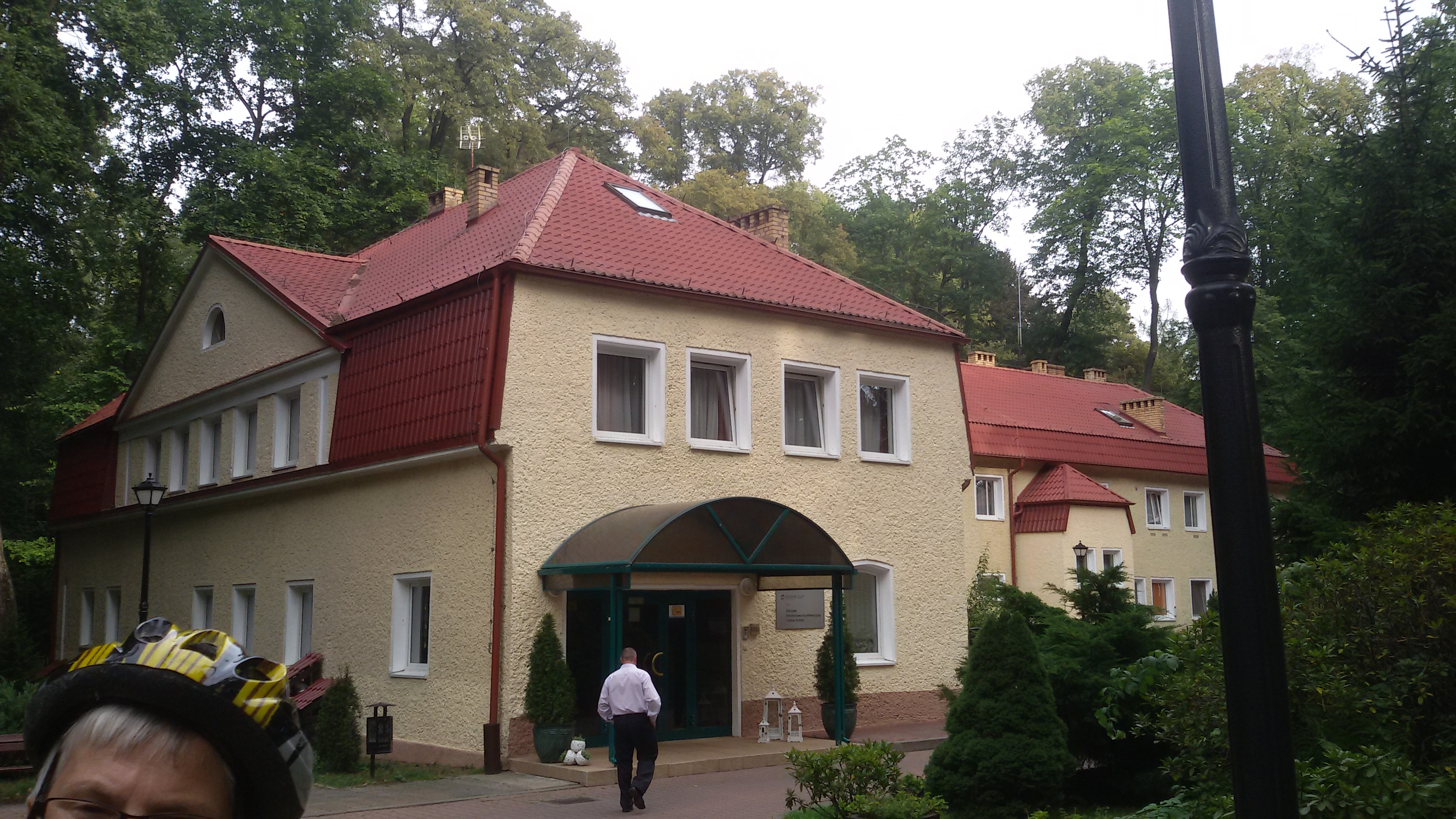

- Location within Poland
- Coordinates: 51°44′16″N 16°08′40″E
- Country: Poland
- Voivodeship: Lower Silesian
- Powiat: Głogów
- Gmina: Kotla
- Time zone: UTC+1 (CET)
  - Summer (DST): UTC+2 (CEST)
- Vehicle registration: DGL

Leśna Dolina [ˈlɛɕna dɔˈlina] is a village in the administrative district of Gmina Kotla, within Głogów County, Lower Silesian Voivodeship, in south-western Poland.
