= Bukwica, Lower Silesian Voivodeship =

Bukwica
- Village
- Location within Poland
- Coordinates: 51°37′20″N 15°59′34″E
- Country: Poland
- Voivodeship: Lower Silesian
- Powiat: Głogów
- Gmina: Żukowice
- Population: 210

Bukwica [bukˈfit͡sa] is a village in the administrative district of Gmina Żukowice, within Głogów County, Lower Silesian Voivodeship, in south-western Poland.
