= Zabłocie, Głogów County =

Zabłocie
- Village
- Location within Poland
- Coordinates: 51°38′15″N 15°58′11″E
- Country: Poland
- Voivodeship: Lower Silesian
- Powiat: Głogów
- Gmina: Żukowice
- Time zone: UTC+1 (CET)
  - Summer (DST): UTC+2 (CEST)
- Vehicle registration: DGL

Zabłocie [zaˈbwɔt͡ɕɛ] is a village in the administrative district of Gmina Żukowice, within Głogów County, Lower Silesian Voivodeship, in south-western Poland.
