= Białołęka, Lower Silesian Voivodeship =

Białołęka
- Village
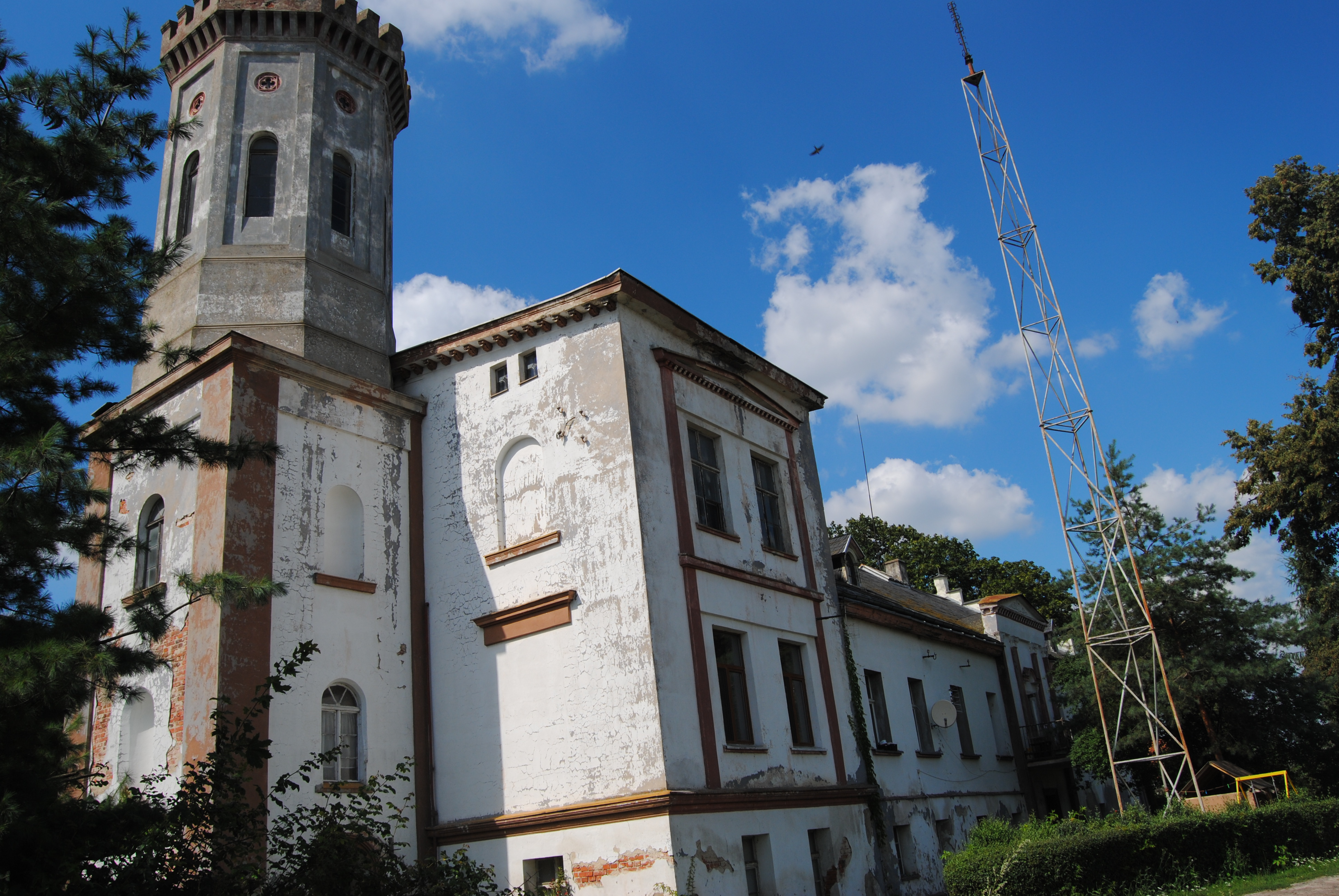
- Palace

- Location within Poland
- Coordinates: 51°38′50″N 16°12′46″E
- Country: Poland
- Voivodeship: Lower Silesian
- County: Głogów
- Gmina: Pęcław

Białołęka [bjawɔˈwɛŋka] is a village in the administrative district of Gmina Pęcław, within Głogów County, Lower Silesian Voivodeship, in south-western Poland.
