= Pęcław, Lower Silesian Voivodeship =

Pęcław
- Village
- Location within Poland
- Coordinates: 51°38′38″N 16°14′29″E
- Country: Poland
- Voivodeship: Lower Silesian
- Powiat: Głogów
- Gmina: Pęcław

Pęcław ([ˈpɛnt͡swaf]) is a village in Głogów County, Lower Silesian Voivodeship, in south-western Poland. It is the seat of the administrative district (gmina) called Gmina Pęcław.
