= Kurowice, Lower Silesian Voivodeship =

Kurowice
- Village
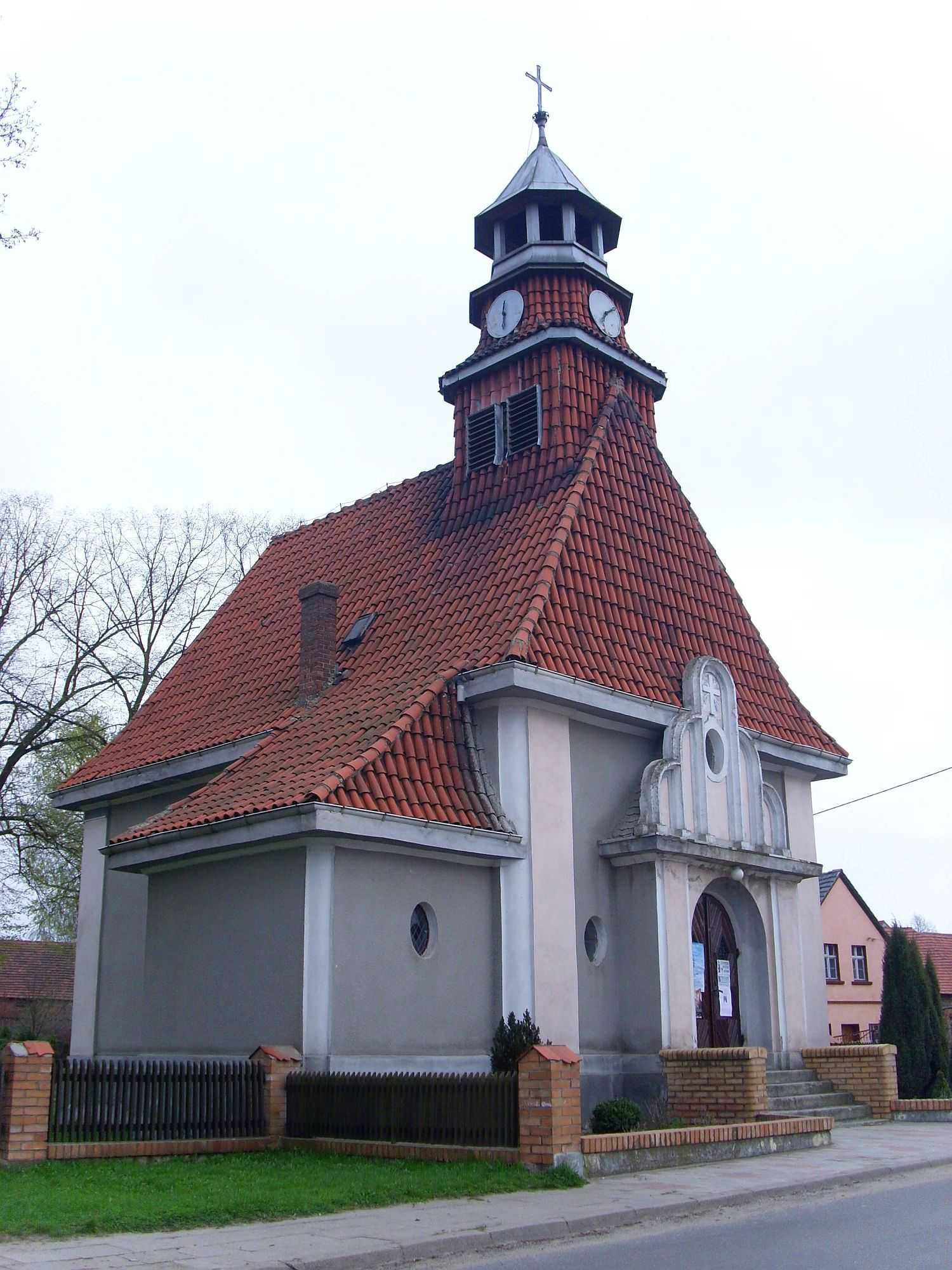
- Catholic church

- Location within Poland
- Coordinates: 51°38′N 16°02′E
- Country: Poland
- Voivodeship: Lower Silesian
- Powiat: Głogów
- Gmina: Jerzmanowa
- Population: 279
- as of April 2011

Kurowice [kurɔˈvit͡sɛ] is a village in the administrative district of Gmina Jerzmanowa, within Głogów County, Lower Silesian Voivodeship, in south-western Poland.

The village has an approximate population of 279 people as of April 2011.
