= Gmina Kotla =

Gmina Kotla Kotla Commune
- Gmina
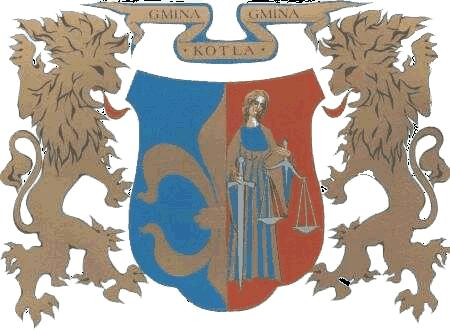
- Coat of arms
- Interactive map of Gmina Kotla
- Coordinates (Kotla): 51°44′45″N 16°02′05″E
- Country: Poland
- Voivodeship: Lower Silesian
- County: Głogów
- Seat: Kotla
- Sołectwos: Ceber, Chociemyśl, Głogówko, Grochowice, Kotla, Kozie Doły, Krzekotówek, Kulów, Moszowice, Skidniów, Sobczyce, Zabiele

Area
  - Total: 127.75 km^{2} (49.32 sq mi)

Population (2019-06-30)
  - Total: 4,426
  - Density: 34.65/km^{2} (89.73/sq mi)
- Website: http://www.kotla.pl

Gmina Kotla is a rural gmina (administrative district) in Głogów County, Lower Silesian Voivodeship, in south-western Poland. Its largest village and administrative seat is Kotla, which lies approximately 11 kilometres (6.8 mi) north of Głogów and 98 km (61 mi) north-west of the regional capital Wrocław.

The gmina covers an area of 127.75 square kilometres (49.32 sq mi), and as of 2019 its total population is 4,426. The local economy is based on agriculture and minor industry.

== Neighbouring gminas ==
Gmina Kotla is bordered by the town of Głogów and the gminas of Głogów, Siedlisko, Sława, Szlichtyngowa and Żukowice.

== Villages ==
The gmina contains the villages of Bogomice, Ceber, Chociemyśl, Dorzecze, Głogówko, Grochowice, Kotla, Kozie Doły, Krążkówko, Krzekotówek, Kulów, Leśna Dolina, Moszowice, Pękoszów, Skidniów, Skidniówek, Skórzyn, Sobczyce, and Zabiele.
