= Skórzyn, Lower Silesian Voivodeship =

Skórzyn
- Village
- Location within Poland
- Coordinates: 51°46′05″N 16°02′57″E
- Country: Poland
- Voivodeship: Lower Silesian
- Powiat: Głogów
- Gmina: Kotla
- Time zone: UTC+1 (CET)
  - Summer (DST): UTC+2 (CEST)
- Vehicle registration: DGL

Skórzyn [ˈskuʐɨn] is a village in the administrative district of Gmina Kotla, within Głogów County, Lower Silesian Voivodeship, in south-western Poland.
