= Wierzchownia, Lower Silesian Voivodeship =

Wierzchownia
- Village
- Location within Poland
- Coordinates: 51°38′15″N 16°15′45″E
- Country: Poland
- Voivodeship: Lower Silesian
- County: Głogów
- Gmina: Pęcław
- Time zone: UTC+1 (CET)
  - Summer (DST): UTC+2 (CEST)
- Vehicle registration: DGL

Wierzchownia [vjɛʂˈxɔvɲa] is a village in the administrative district of Gmina Pęcław, within Głogów County, Lower Silesian Voivodeship, in south-western Poland.
