= Żukowice, Lower Silesian Voivodeship =

Żukowice
- Village
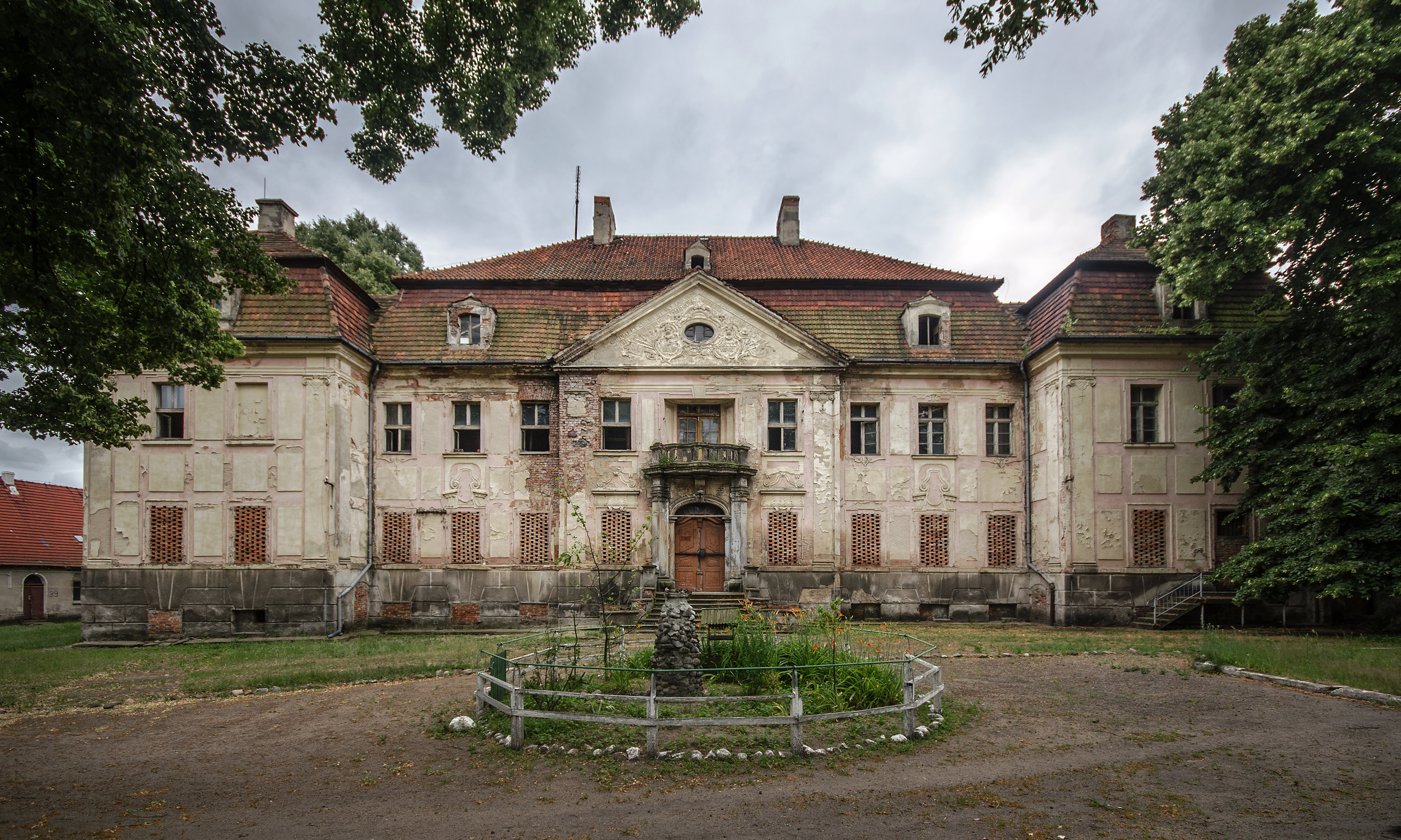
- Palace

- Location within Poland
- Coordinates: 51°40′32″N 15°58′57″E
- Country: Poland
- Voivodeship: Lower Silesian
- County: Głogów
- Gmina: Żukowice
- Population: 55

Żukowice [ʐukɔˈvit͡sɛ] is a village in Głogów County, Lower Silesian Voivodeship, in south-western Poland. It is the seat of the administrative district (gmina) called Gmina Żukowice.
