= Gmina Jerzmanowa =

Gmina Jerzmanowa Jerzmanowa Commune
- Gmina
- Coat of arms
- Interactive map of Gmina Jerzmanowa
- Coordinates (Jerzmanowa): 51°36′0″N 16°03′0″E
- Country: Poland
- Voivodeship: Lower Silesian
- County: Głogów
- Seat: Jerzmanowa
- Sołectwos: Bądzów, Gaiki, Jaczów, Jerzmanowa, Kurów Mały, Kurowice, Łagoszów Mały, Maniów, Modła, Potoczek, Smardzów

Area
  - Total: 63.44 km^{2} (24.49 sq mi)

Population (2019-06-30)
  - Total: 5,091
  - Density: 80.25/km^{2} (207.8/sq mi)
- Website: https://www.jerzmanowa.com.pl

Gmina Jerzmanowa is a rural gmina (administrative district) in Głogów County, Lower Silesian Voivodeship, in south-western Poland. Its seat is the village of Jerzmanowa, which lies approximately 7 kilometres (4.3 mi) south of Głogów and 87 km (54 mi) north-west of the regional capital Wrocław.

The gmina covers an area of 63.44 square kilometres (24.49 sq mi), and as of 2019 its total population is 5,091.

== Neighbouring gminas ==
Gmina Jerzmanowa is bordered by the gminas of Głogów, Grębocice, Polkowice, Radwanice and Żukowice.

== Villages ==
The gmina contains the villages of Bądzów, Gaiki, Jaczów, Jerzmanowa, Kurów Mały, Kurowice, Łagoszów Mały, Maniów, Modła, Potoczek and Smardzów.
