= Gmina Pęcław =

Gmina Pęcław Pęcław Commune
- Gmina
- Coat of arms
- Interactive map of Gmina Pęcław
- Coordinates (Pęcław): 51°38′38″N 16°14′29″E
- Country: Poland
- Voivodeship: Lower Silesian
- County: Głogów
- Seat: Pęcław
- Sołectwos: Białołęka, Droglowice, Kotowice-Leszkowice, Pęcław, Piersna, Wierzchownia, Wietszyce, Wojszyn

Area
  - Total: 64.13 km^{2} (24.76 sq mi)

Population (2019-06-30)
  - Total: 2,272
  - Density: 35.43/km^{2} (91.76/sq mi)
- Website: http://www.peclaw.eu/

Gmina Pęcław is a rural gmina (administrative district) in Głogów County, Lower Silesian Voivodeship, in south-western Poland. Its seat is the village of Pęcław, which lies approximately 12 kilometres (7.5 mi) east of Głogów and 80 km (50 mi) north-west of the regional capital Wrocław.

The gmina covers an area of 64.13 square kilometres (24.76 sq mi), and as of 2019 its total population was 2,272.

== Neighbouring gminas ==
Gmina Pęcław is bordered by the gminas of Głogów, Grębocice, Niechlów, Rudna and Szlichtyngowa.

== Villages ==
The gmina contains the villages of Białołęka, Borków, Droglowice, Golkowice, Kaczyce, Kotowice, Leszkowice, Mileszyn, Pęcław, Piersna, Turów, Wierzchownia, Wietszyce and Wojszyn.
