= Głogów County =

Coordinates: 51°39′33″N 16°04′50″E

Głogów County Powiat głogowski
- County
- Flag Coat of arms

- Głogów County (red) within Lower Silesian Voivodeship
- Country: Poland
- Voivodeship: Lower Silesian
- Seat: Głogów
- Gminas: Total 6 (incl. 1 urban): Głogów; Gmina Głogów; Gmina Jerzmanowa; Gmina Kotla; Gmina Pęcław; Gmina Żukowice

Area
  - Total: 443.06 km^{2} (171.07 sq mi)

Population (2019-06-30)
  - Total: 89,319
  - Density: 201.60/km^{2} (522.13/sq mi)
  - Urban: 67,317
  - Rural: 22,002
- Car plates: DGL
- Website: www.powiat.glogow.pl

Głogów County (Polish: powiat głogowski) is a unit of territorial administration and local government (powiat) in Lower Silesian Voivodeship, south-western Poland. It came into being on January 1, 1999, as a result of the Polish local government reforms passed in 1998. The county covers an area of 443.06 square kilometres (171.1 sq mi). Its administrative seat and only town is Głogów.

As of 2019 the total population of the county is 89,319, of which the population of the town of Głogów is 67,317 and the rural population is 22,002.

== Neighbouring counties ==
Głogów County is bordered by Wschowa County to the north-east, Góra County to the east, Lubin County and Polkowice County to the south, and Żagań County and Nowa Sól County to the west.

== Administrative divisions ==
The county is subdivided into six gminas (one urban and five rural). These are listed in the following table, in descending order of population.

Gmina	Type	Area (km^{2})	Population (2019)	Seat
Głogów	urban	35.4	67,317	
Gmina Głogów	rural	84.3	6,767	Głogów*
Gmina Jerzmanowa	rural	63.4	5,091	Jerzmanowa
Gmina Kotla	rural	127.8	4,426	Kotla
Gmina Żukowice	rural	68.1	3,446	Żukowice
Gmina Pęcław	rural	64.1	2,272	Pęcław
* seat not part of the gmina
