= Rakowice =

Rakowice may refer to:

- Rakowice, Bolesławiec County in Lower Silesian Voivodeship (south-west Poland)
- Rakowice, Strzelin County in Lower Silesian Voivodeship (south-west Poland)
- Rakowice, Ząbkowice County in Lower Silesian Voivodeship (south-west Poland)
- Rakowice, Łódź Voivodeship (central Poland)
- Rakowice, Pomeranian Voivodeship (north Poland)
- Rakowice, Warmian-Masurian Voivodeship (north Poland)
- Rakowice, Kraków, part of the Prądnik Czerwony district of Kraków
- Rakowice Małe
- Rakowice Wielkie

== See also ==
- Kraków-Rakowice-Czyżyny Airport
- Rakowski
