= Bielanka =

Bielanka may refer to:

- Bielanka, Lower Silesian Voivodeship (south-west Poland)
- Bielanka, Gorlice County in Lesser Poland Voivodeship (south Poland)
- Bielanka, Nowy Targ County in Lesser Poland Voivodeship (south Poland)
