= Żerkowice, Lower Silesian Voivodeship =

Żerkowice
- Village
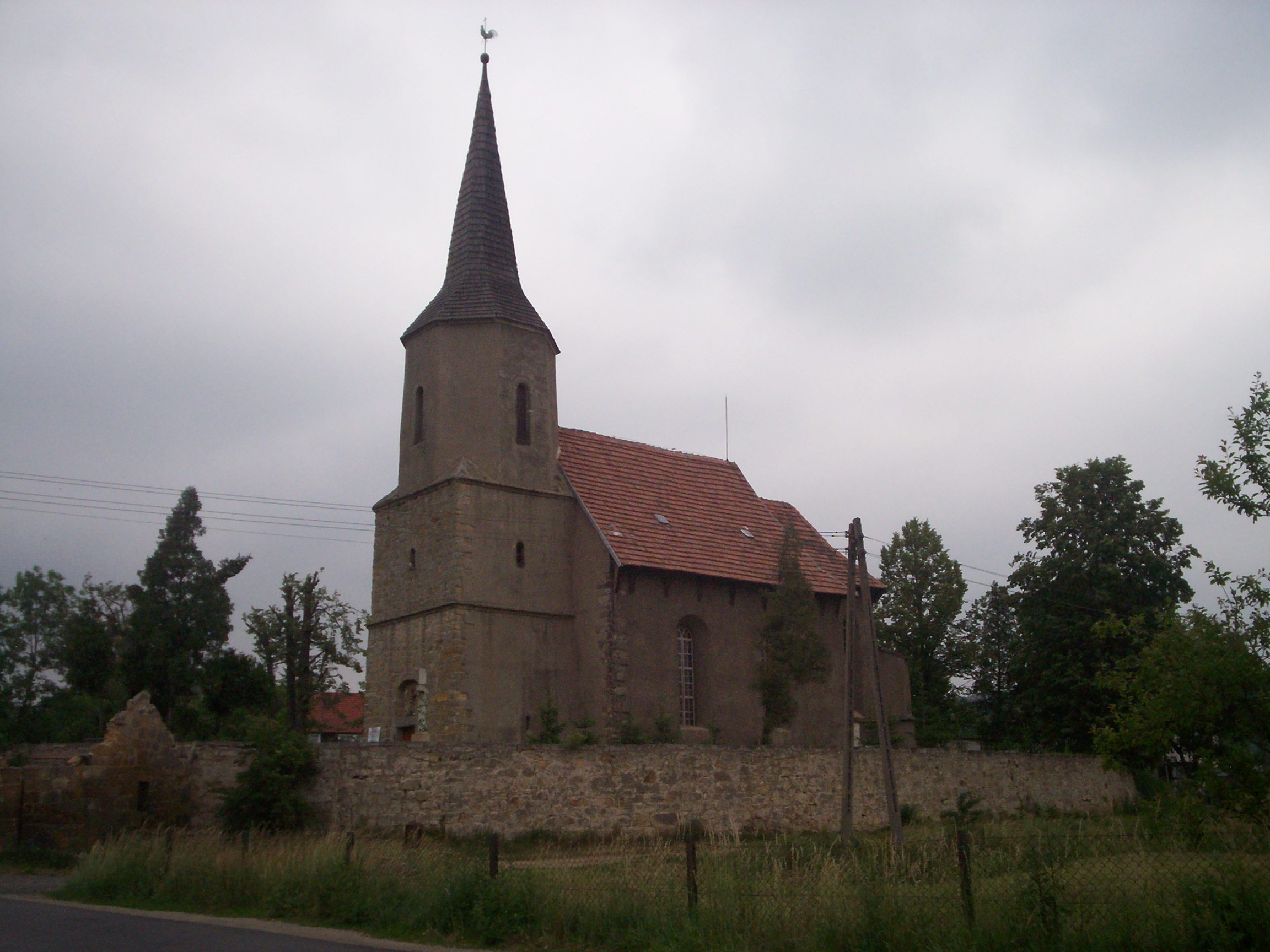
- Church

- Location within Poland
- Coordinates: 51°09′13″N 15°34′14″E
- Country: Poland
- Voivodeship: Lower Silesian
- County: Lwówek
- Gmina: Lwówek Śląski

Żerkowice [ʐɛrkɔˈvit͡sɛ] is a village in the administrative district of Gmina Lwówek Śląski, within Lwówek County, Lower Silesian Voivodeship, in south-western Poland.
