= Prasiolite =

Quartz variety

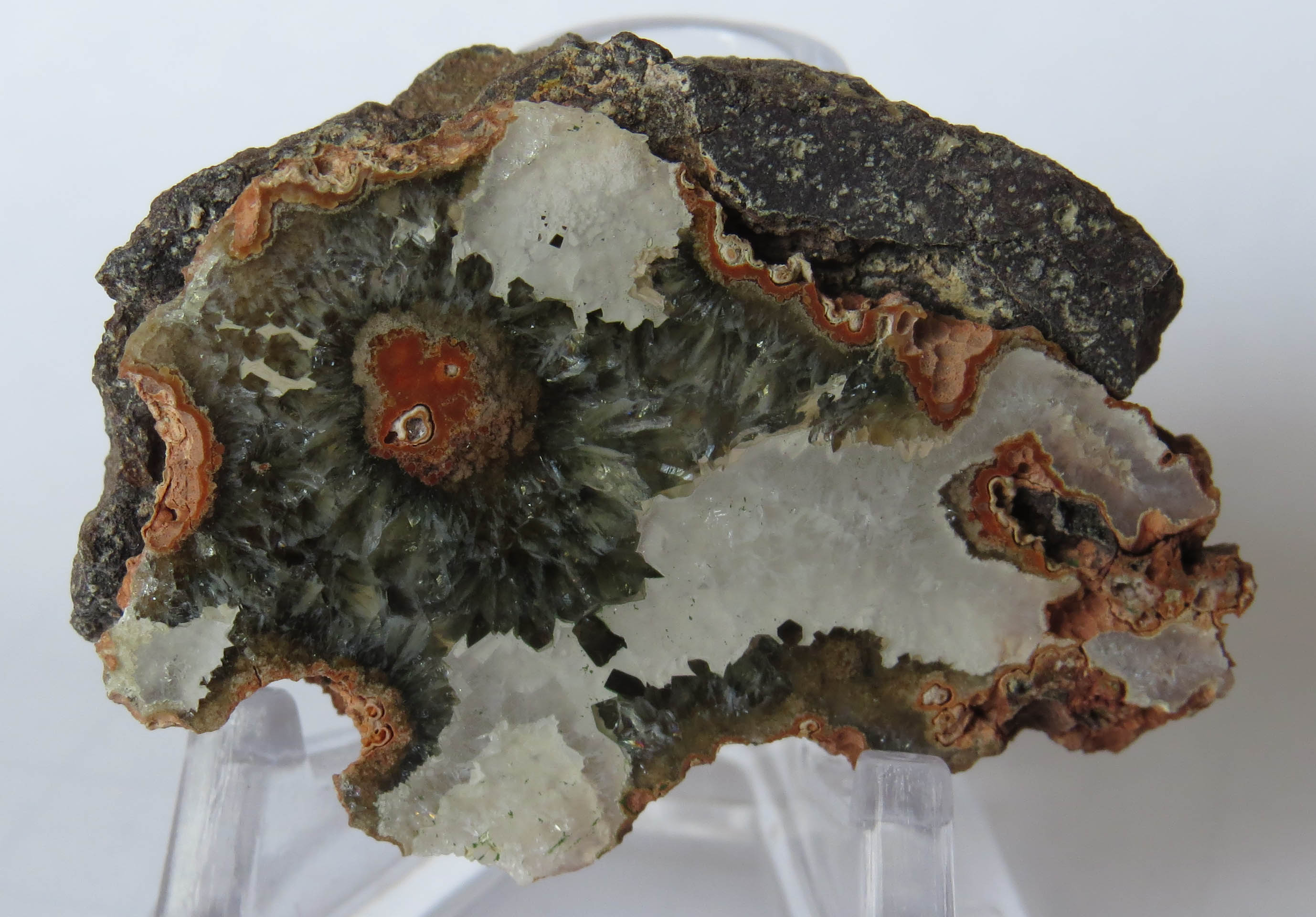
- Natural prasiolite from Różana, Nowy Kościół, Lower Silesian Voivodeship, Poland

General
- Category: Tectosilicate minerals
- Group: Quartz group
- IMA status: Variety of quartz
- Crystal system: Trigonal

Identification
- Color: Shades of green
- Crystal habit: Hexagonal prisms
- Cleavage: None
- Fracture: Conchoidal
- Tenacity: Brittle
- Mohs scale hardness: 7 – lower in impure varieties
- Diaphaneity: Transparent
- Specific gravity: 2.65
- Refractive index: 1.544 to 1.553
- Birefringence: 0.009
- Ultraviolet fluorescence: None

Prasiolite (also known as green amethyst or vermarine) is a green, transparent variety of quartz that derives its color from the presence of Fe^{2+} ions within the crystal structure. Prasiolite is not the only green variety of quartz, and it should not be confused with prase, chrysoprase, chrome chalcedony, or quartz colored by inclusions of chlorite or epidote.

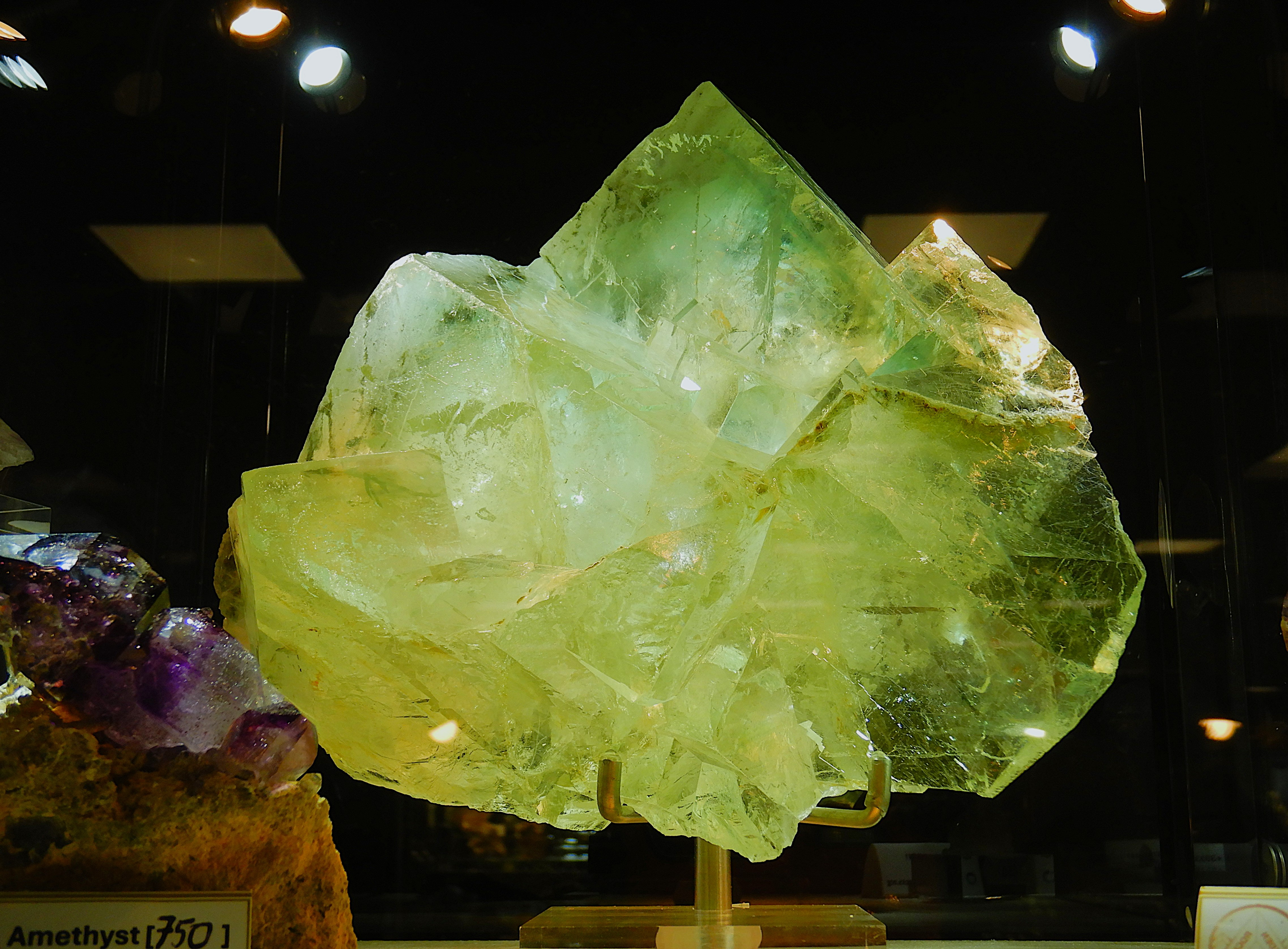
"Green amethyst" prasiolite

Natural prasiolite is exceedingly rare, having been first discovered in the early 19th century in Lower Silesia, Poland with only a few other deposits known to exist. Natural prasiolite deposits include Płóczki Górne (Poland), Bahia (Brazil), Thunder Bay (Canada), and Farm Rooisand (Namibia).

Nearly all commercially available prasiolite is artificial, either produced by heat-treating amethysts from certain locations to 400-500 °C, or irradiating yellow-tinged quartzes. Most amethyst will turn yellow or orange when heated, producing heat-treated amethysts which are often marketed as citrine, but some amethyst will turn green when treated. Significant prasiolite production began in the mid-1950s with the discovery that amethysts from the Montezuma mine in Minas Gerais, Brazil turned green when heat-treated.

Most prasiolite sold is used in jewellery settings, where it can substitute for far more expensive gemstones, such as peridot, tsavorite, and emerald. Prasiolite used for jewelry comes from two main sources: heat-treated amethyst from the Montezuma mine, and irradiated yellow-tinged quartz from various locations throughout Brazil.

Prasiolite is sometimes incorrectly called green amethyst, which is not an acceptable name for the material according to Federal Trade Commission Guidelines. Other names for green quartz include vermarine and lime citrine.

The word prasiolite literally means "leek-green stone" and is derived from Ancient Greek πράσον prason meaning "leek" and λίθος lithos meaning "stone". The stone was given its name due to its green-colored appearance.

Natural prasiolite is often a very light, translucent green. Darker green quartz is generally the result of artificial treatment, with lighter-colored prasiolite often irradiated with gamma rays as an attempt to obtain deeper colors.

== See also ==
- List of minerals
