= Nagórze, Lower Silesian Voivodeship =

Nagórze
- Village
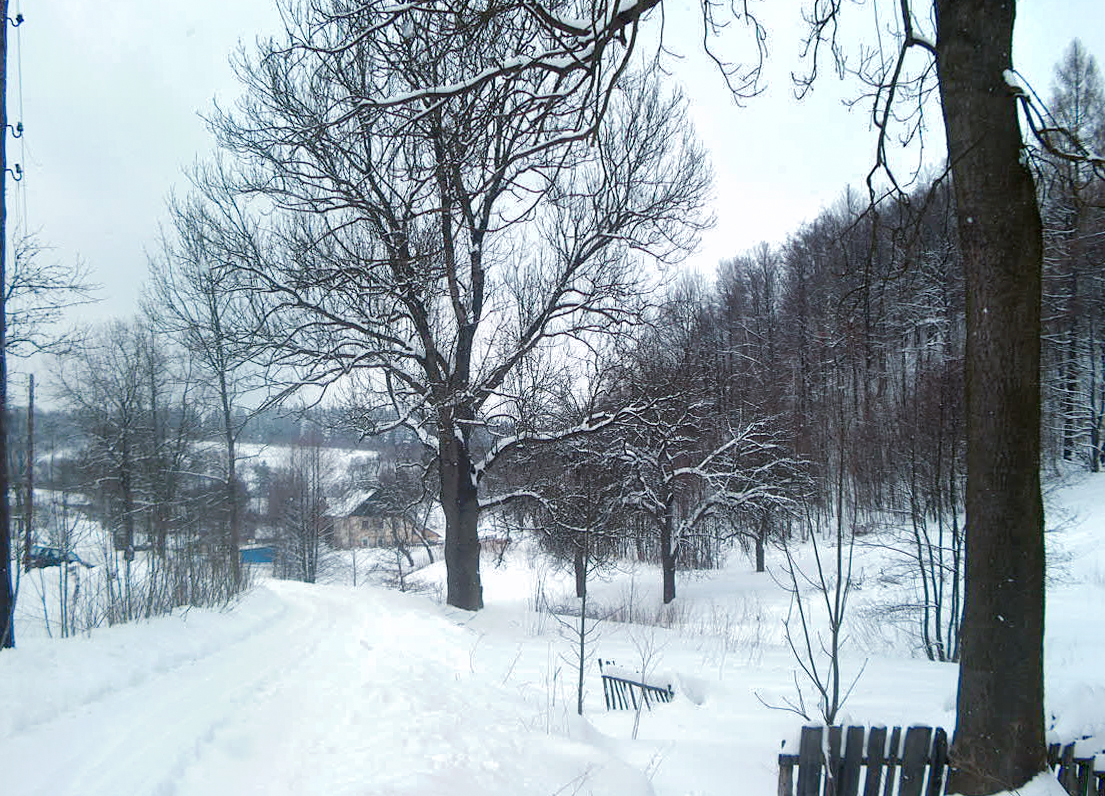

- Location within Poland
- Coordinates: 51°03′25″N 15°30′40″E
- Country: Poland
- Voivodeship: Lower Silesian
- County: Lwówek
- Gmina: Lwówek Śląski
- Population: 45

Nagórze [naˈɡuʐɛ] is a village in the administrative district of Gmina Lwówek Śląski, within Lwówek County, Lower Silesian Voivodeship, in south-western Poland.
