= Dłużec, Lower Silesian Voivodeship =

Dłużec
- Village
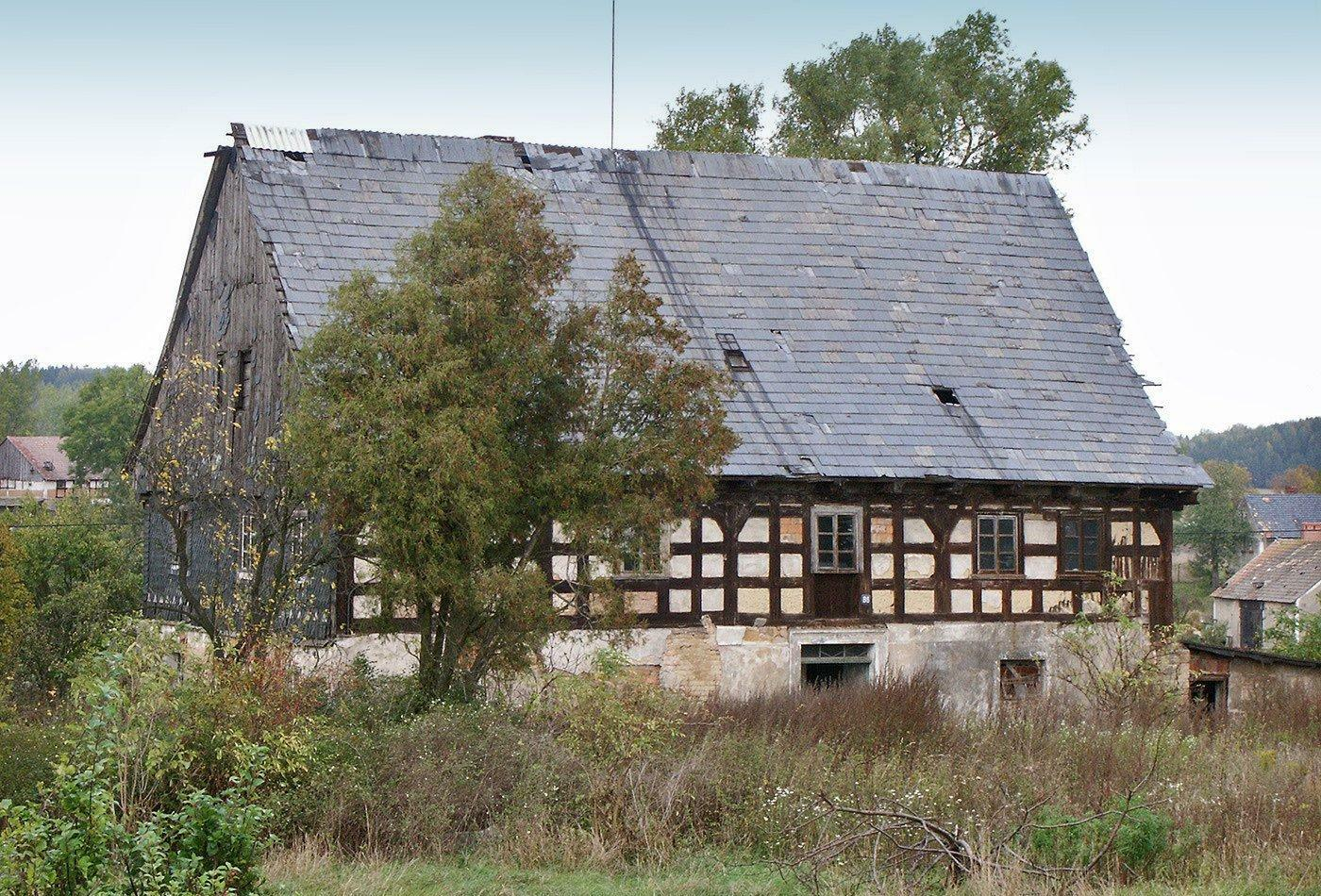

- Location within Poland
- Coordinates: 51°05′07″N 15°42′19″E
- Country: Poland
- Voivodeship: Lower Silesian
- County: Lwówek
- Gmina: Lwówek Śląski

Dłużec [ˈdwuʐɛt͡s] is a village in the administrative district of Gmina Lwówek Śląski, within Lwówek County, Lower Silesian Voivodeship, in south-western Poland.
