= Pieszków =

Pieszków may refer to the following places in Poland:

- Pieszków, Lubin County, in Gmina Lubin, Lower Silesian Voivodeship (SW Poland)
- Pieszków, Lwówek County, in Gmina Lwówek Śląski, Lower Silesian Voivodeship (SW Poland)
