= Brunów, Lwówek County =

Brunów
- Village
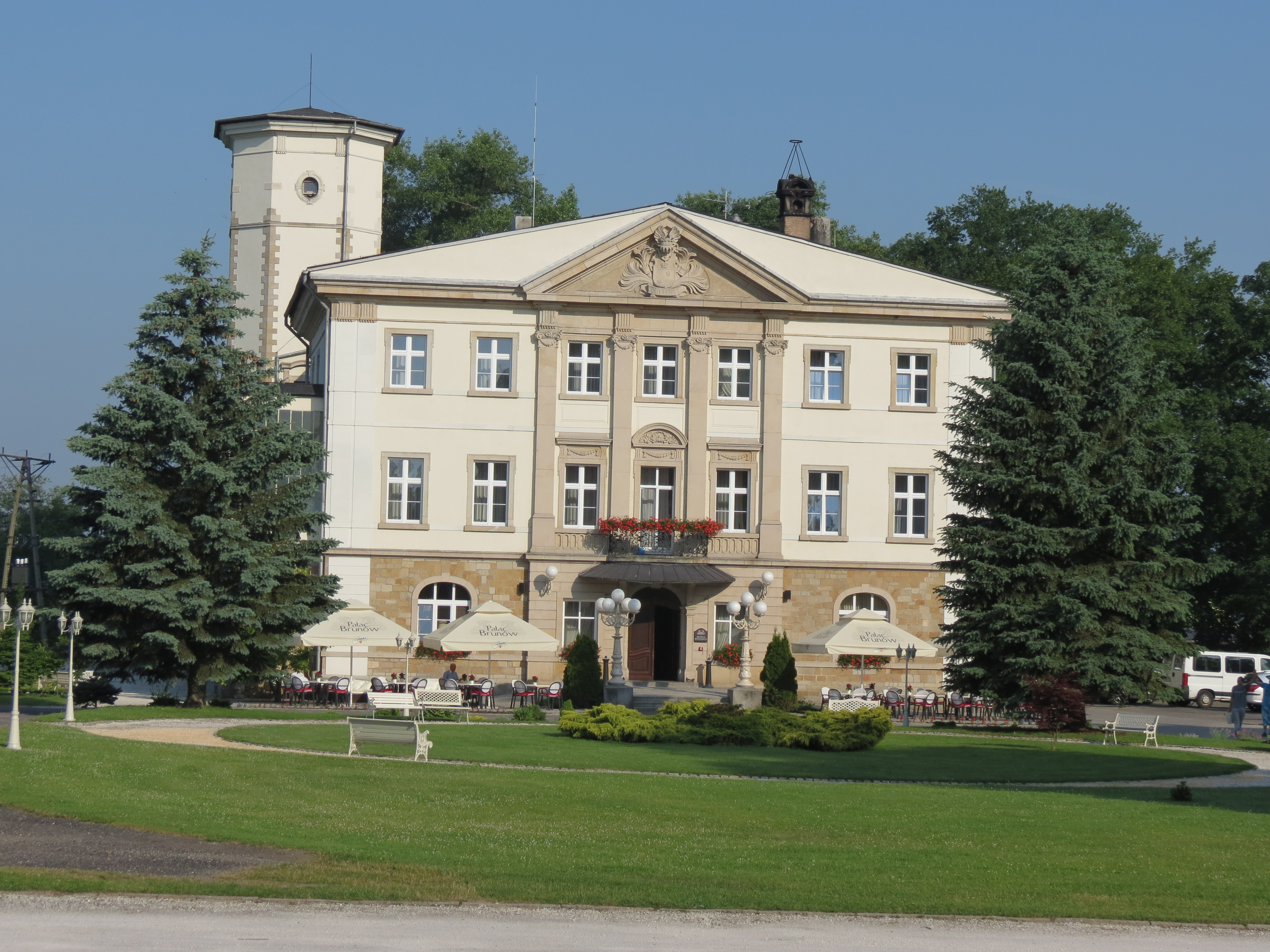
- Brunów Palace

- Location within Poland
- Coordinates: 51°08′03″N 15°35′03″E
- Country: Poland
- Voivodeship: Lower Silesian
- County: Lwówek
- Gmina: Lwówek Śląski
- Population: 125

Brunów [ˈbrunuf] is a village in the administrative district of Gmina Lwówek Śląski, within Lwówek County, Lower Silesian Voivodeship, in south-western Poland.
