= Dworek, Lower Silesian Voivodeship =

Dworek
- Village
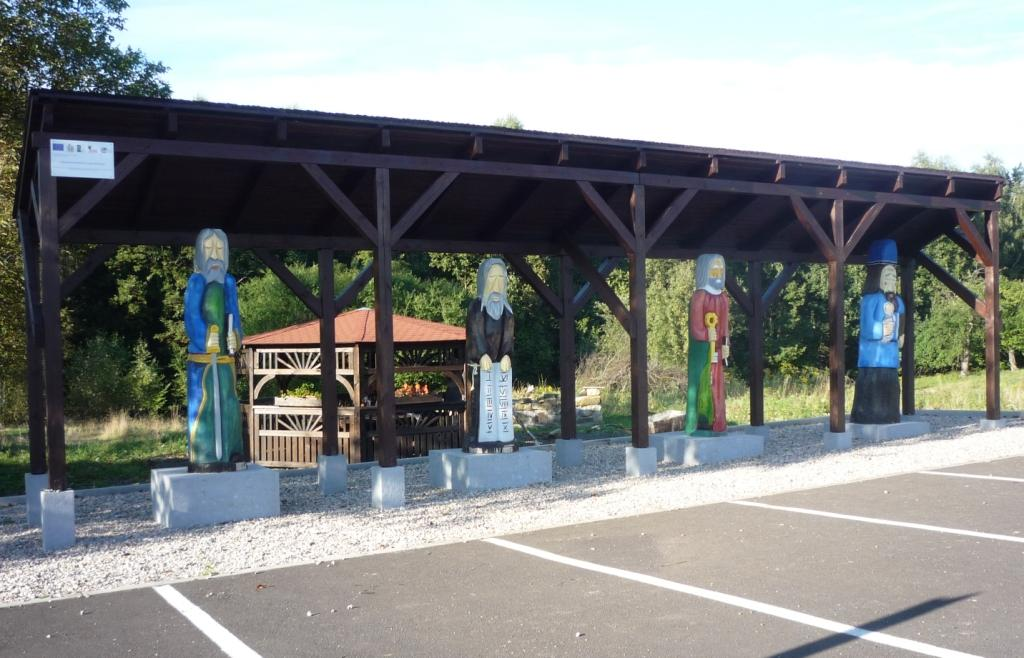

- Location within Poland
- Coordinates: 51°06′16″N 15°39′14″E
- Country: Poland
- Voivodeship: Lower Silesian
- County: Lwówek
- Gmina: Lwówek Śląski

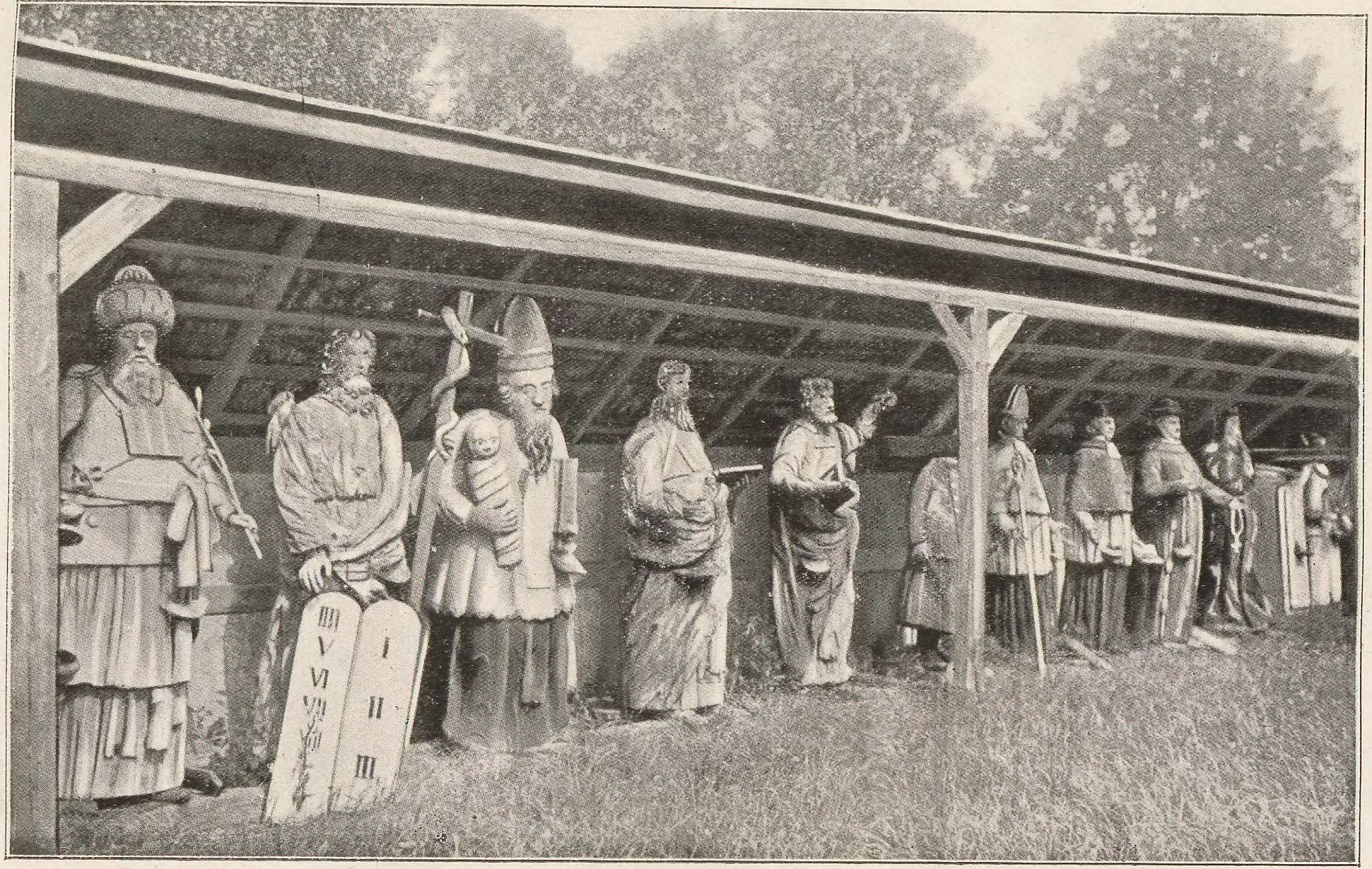
Old beehives

Dworek [ˈdvɔrɛk] is a village in the administrative district of Gmina Lwówek Śląski, within Lwówek County, Lower Silesian Voivodeship, in south-western Poland.
