= Niwnice =

- Village
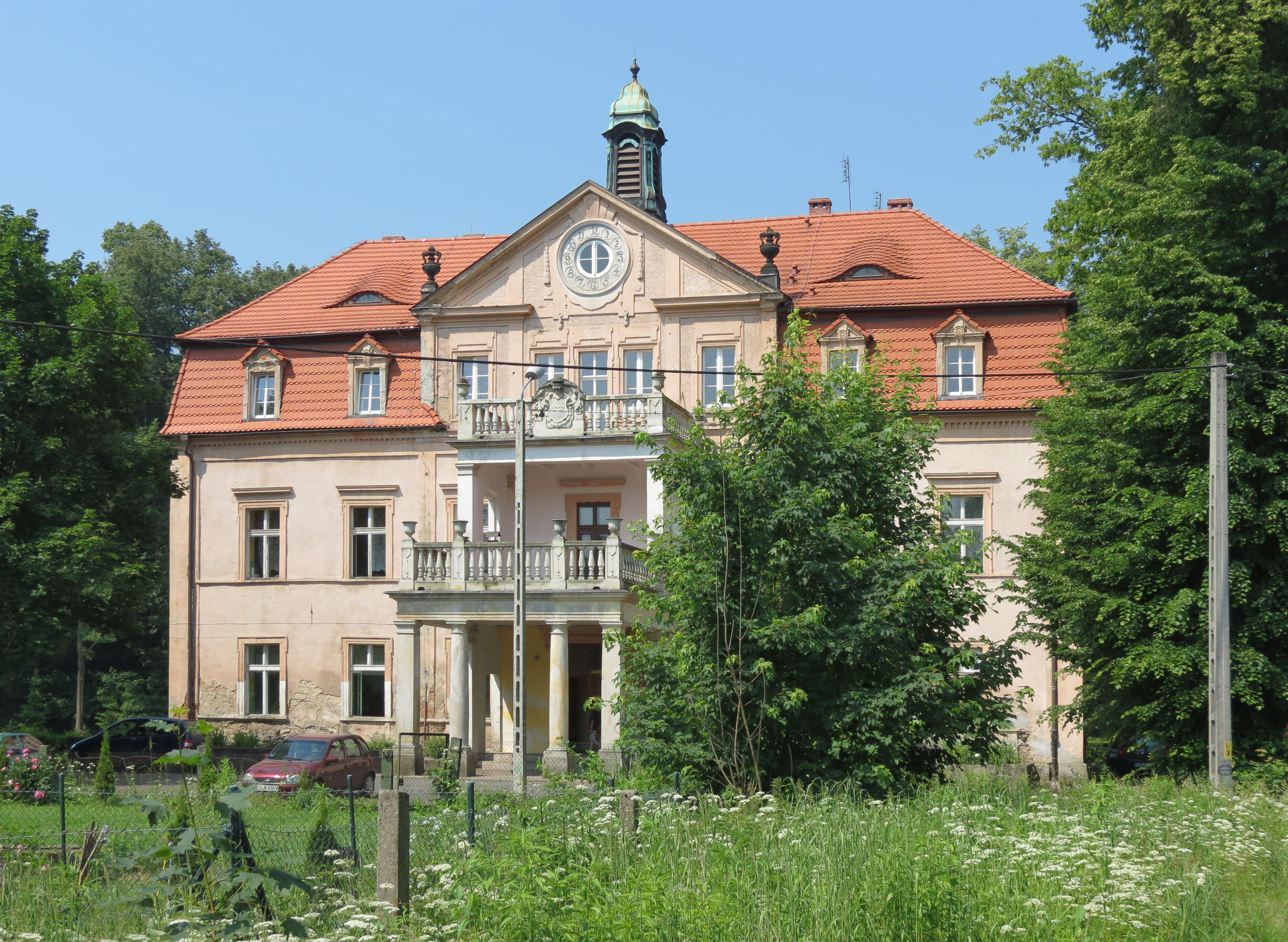
- Nostitz family palace

- Location within Poland
- Coordinates: 51°06′51″N 15°29′06″E
- Country: Poland
- Voivodeship: Lower Silesian
- County: Lwówek
- Gmina: Lwówek Śląski

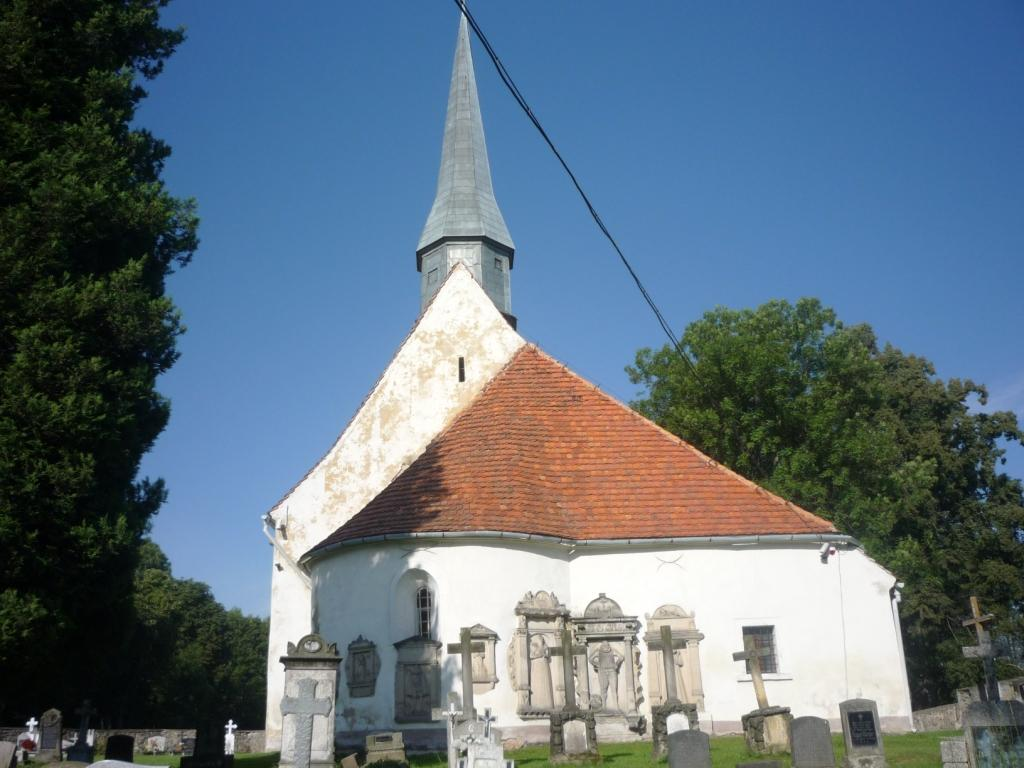
Church of Saint Hedwig of Andechs

Niwnice [nivˈnit͡sɛ] (German: Kunzendorf unter dem Walde) is a village in the administrative district of Gmina Lwówek Śląski, within Lwówek County, Lower Silesian Voivodeship, in south-western Poland.

== Notable residents ==
- Wend von Wietersheim (1900–1975), Wehrmacht general
