= Ustronie, Lwówek County =

Ustronie
- Village
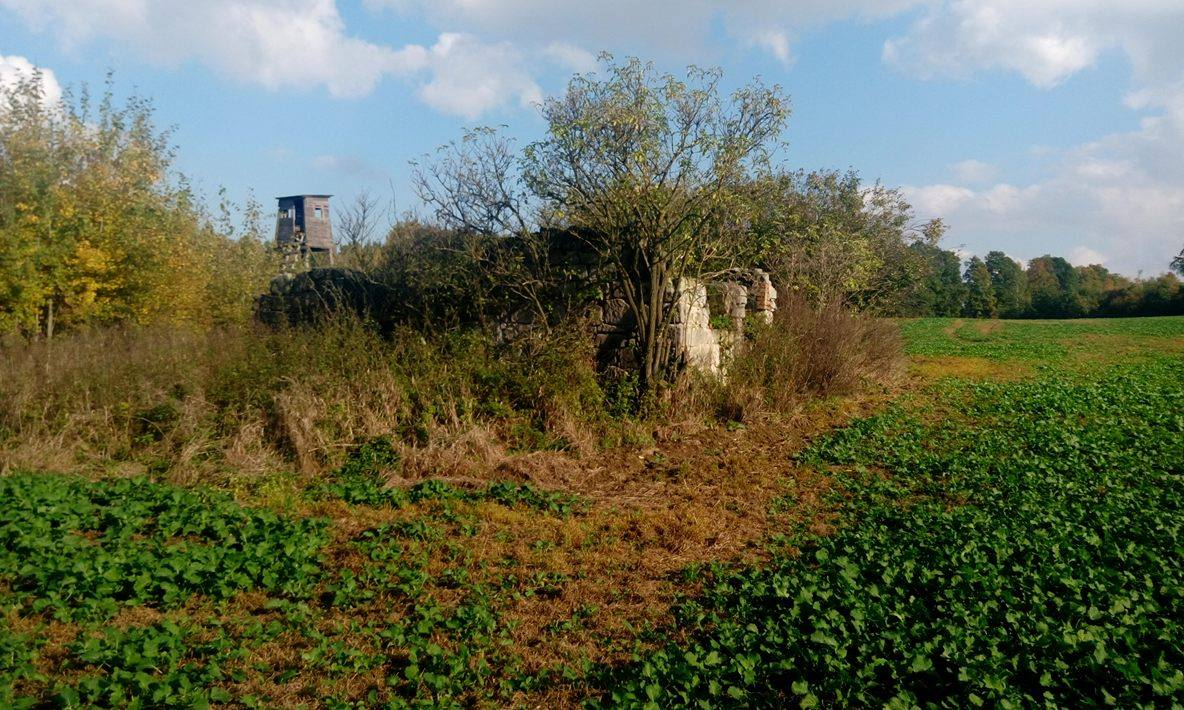

- Location within Poland
- Coordinates: 51°10′21″N 15°37′55″E
- Country: Poland
- Voivodeship: Lower Silesian
- County: Lwówek
- Gmina: Lwówek Śląski
- Population: 260

Ustronie [usˈtrɔɲɛ] is a village in the administrative district of Gmina Lwówek Śląski, within Lwówek County, Lower Silesian Voivodeship, in south-western Poland.
