= Dębowy Gaj =

- Village
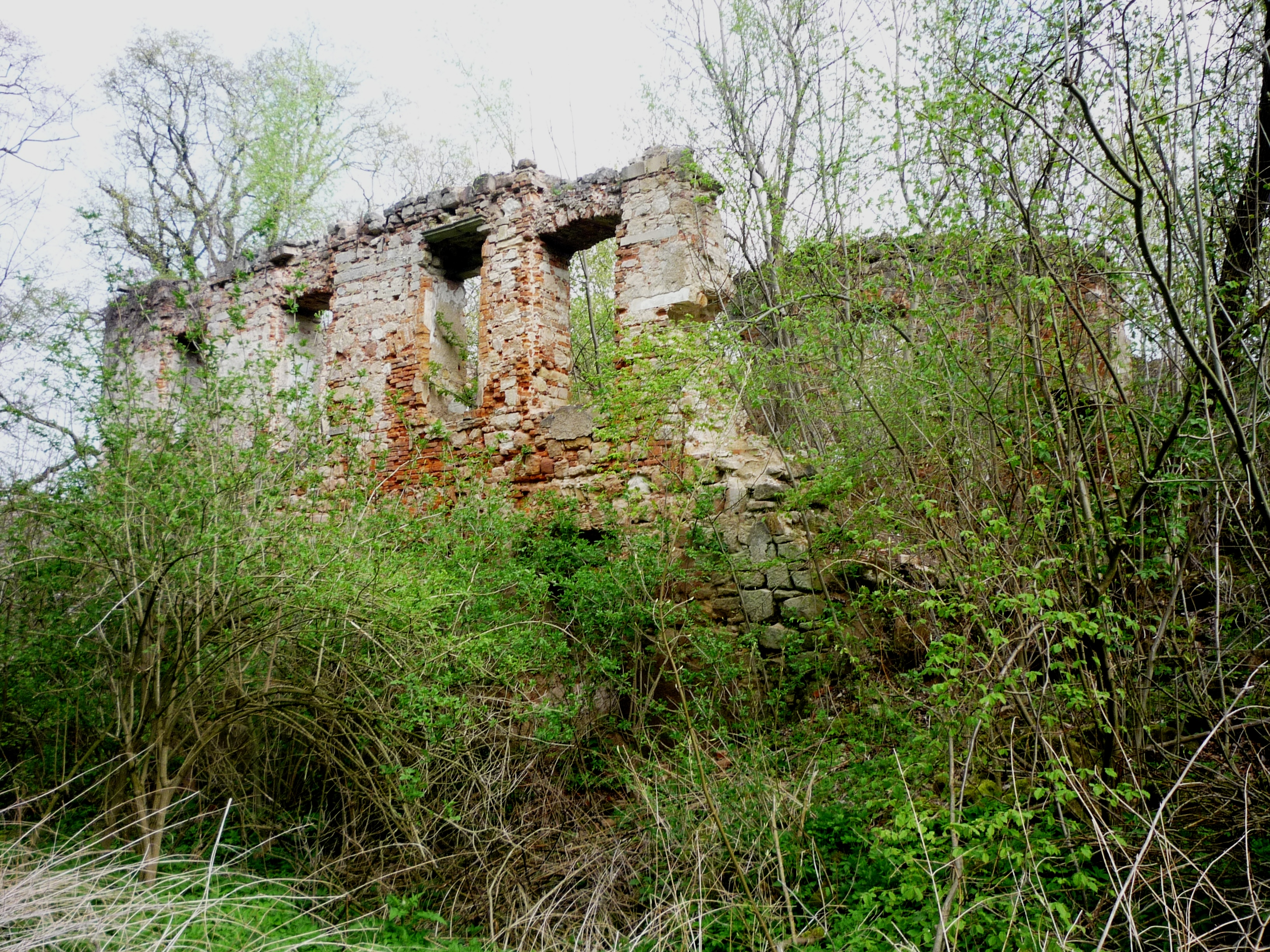

- Location within Poland
- Coordinates: 51°4′N 15°38′E
- Country: Poland
- Voivodeship: Lower Silesian
- County: Lwówek
- Gmina: Lwówek Śląski

Dębowy Gaj (Polish pronunciation: [dɛmˈbɔvɨ ˈɡaj]) is a village in the administrative district of Gmina Lwówek Śląski, within Lwówek County, Lower Silesian Voivodeship, in south-western Poland.
