= Kotliska, Lower Silesian Voivodeship =

Kotliska
- Village
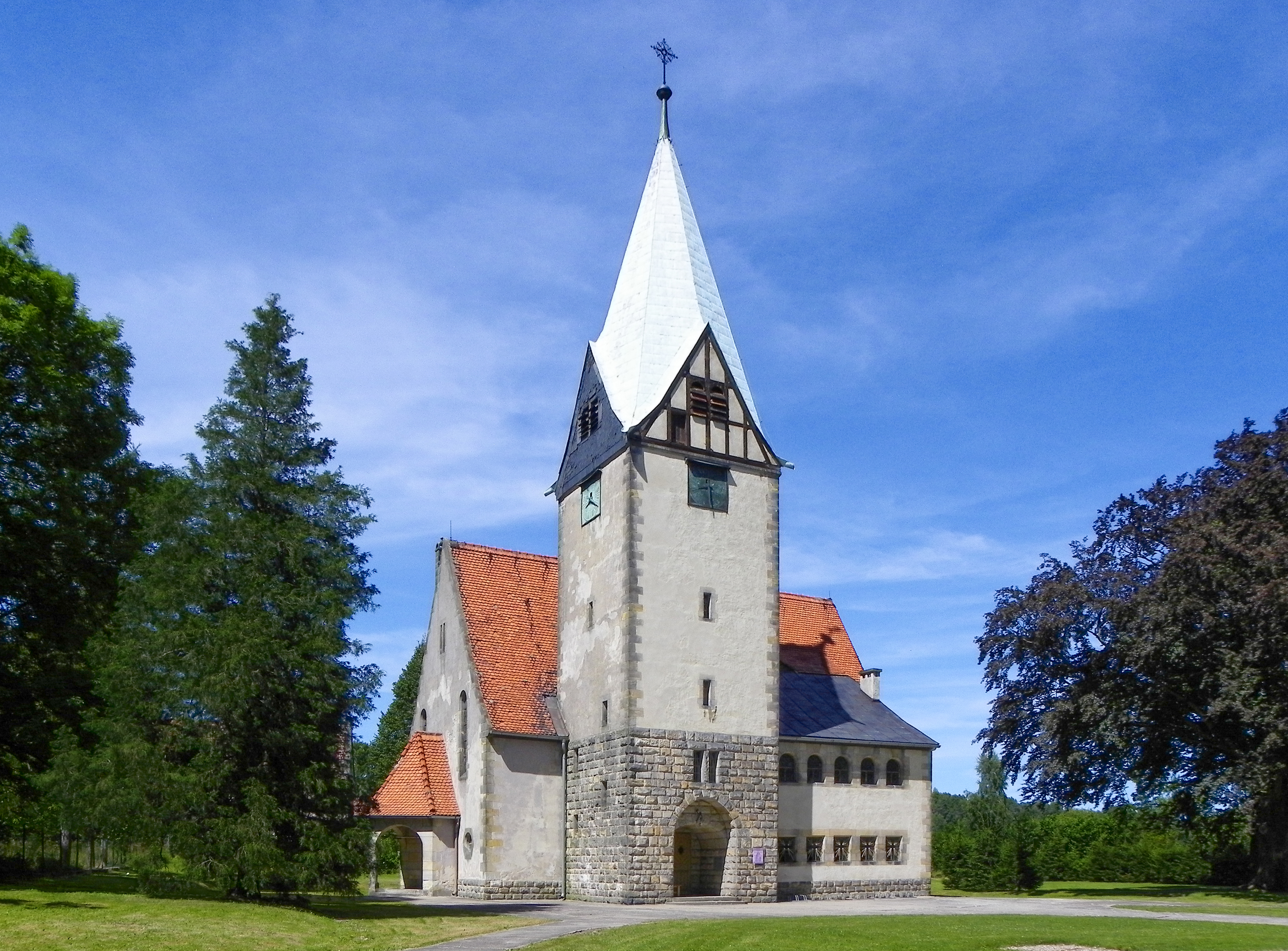

- Location within Poland
- Coordinates: 51°09′22″N 15°30′49″E
- Country: Poland
- Voivodeship: Lower Silesian
- County: Lwówek
- Gmina: Lwówek Śląski

Kotliska (Polish pronunciation: [kɔˈtliska]; German: Kesselsdorf) is a village in the administrative district of Gmina Lwówek Śląski, within Lwówek County, Lower Silesian Voivodeship, in south-western Poland.
