= Top Model. Zostań modelką season 1 =

Top Model. Zostań modelką
- Season 1
- No. of episodes: 13

Release
- Original network: TVN
- Original release: 8 September – 1 December 2010

Season chronology
- Next → Season 2

Top Model. Zostań modelką, Cycle 1 (Polish for Top Model. Become a Model) was the first cycle of an ongoing reality documentary based on Tyra Banks' America's Next Top Model that places contestants from Poland against each other in a variety of competitions to determine who will win the title of the next Polish Top Model and a modeling contract with NEXT Model Management and an appearance on the cover of the Polish issue of Glamour and a nationwide Max Factor campaign in hopes of a successful future in the modeling business.

The competition was hosted by Polish-born model Joanna Krupa who served as the lead judge alongside fashion designer, Dawid Woliński, journalist Karolina Korwin-Piotrowska and photographer Marcin Tyszka. International top models Anja Rubik and Magda Mielcarz made guest appearances and coached the contestants in multiple episodes.

The international destination this cycle was Milan.

The winner of the competition was 19-year-old Paulina Papierska from Zbąszynek.

== Contestants ==
(ages stated are at start of contest)

Contestant	Age	Height	Hometown	Finish	Place
Zuzanna 'Zuza' Walkowiak	18	1.74 m (5 ft 8 1/2 in)	Poznań	Episode 4	14
Sonia Wesołowska	18	1.75 m (5 ft 9 in)	Elbląg	Episode 5	13
Paulina Pszech	19	1.76 m (5 ft 9 1/2 in)	Lublin	Episode 6	12
Nicole Rosłoniec	19	1.76 m (5 ft 9 1/2 in)	Grudziądz	Episode 7	11 (quit)
Pamela Jedziniak	17	1.78 m (5 ft 10 in)	Gdynia	Episode 7	10
Marta Szulawiak	25	1.70 m (5 ft 7 in)	Warsaw	Episode 8	9
Emilia Pietras	23	1.73 m (5 ft 8 in)	Warsaw	Episode 9	8
Magdalena 'Magda' Swat	19	1.72 m (5 ft 7 1/2 in)	Ostrowiec Świętokrzyski	Episode 10	7
Beata Szarłowska	25	1.85 m (6 ft 1 in)	Gdańsk	Episode 11	6
Weronika Lewicka	18	1.83 m (6 ft 0 in)	Przysłuchy	Episode 12	5
Katarzyna 'Kasia' Smolińska	18	1.77 m (5 ft 9 1/2 in)	Kraków	Episode 12	4
Anna 'Ania' Piszczałka	19	1.78 m (5 ft 10 in)	Gradówek	Episode 13	3
Aleksandra 'Ola' Kuligowska	20	1.72 m (5 ft 7 1/2 in)	Wrocław	Episode 13	2
Paulina Papierska	19	1.72 m (5 ft 7 1/2 in)	Zbąszynek	Episode 13	1

== Episodes ==
=== Episode 1 ===
Original Air Date: 8 September 2010

Joanna Krupa is put in the host position of her own country's version of the world-famous Top Model franchise. She is more than excited to finally find a model, but she won't do it alone; she, Dawid Woliński, Karolina Korwin-Piotrowska and photographer Marcin Tyszka will scout the country in order to find the very first Poland's Next Top Model. Castings take place in Sopot and Warsaw.

=== Episode 2 ===
Original Air Date: 15 September 2010

The second week of casting continues, and after the first week of scouting, Poland's Next Top Model is ready to find a top model. Castings take place in Wrocław and Warsaw.

=== Episode 3 ===
Original Air Date: 22 September 2010

The third week of casting is the very last week of semi-finals, after the previous two weeks of casting. The 50 semi-finalists will be narrowed down to only 13 models who will officially start the competition.

The models are taken to the countryside. After Joanna's entrance, the contestants must endure a grueling model boot camp, and they are forced to change into army uniforms. They are later pushed to their limits in a series of intense physical tests. A number of girls are sent home, while the remaining ones get together and have a meal.

Zuza begins to say negative things about Paulina Ps.' appearance, such as the fact that she is trying to look like Lady Gaga. After a group photo shoot, the girls must face the judges for one final elimination.

Group	Models	Theme
**One**	Emilia, **Marika**, Pamela, Sonia, **Weronika C.**, Weronika L.	Pin-up girls
**Two**	**Marta Si.**, Marta Sz. Ola, Nicole, Paulina Pa., Paulina Ps.	Soldiers
**Three**	**Adela**, Ania, Beata, **Daniela**, Kasia, **Monika**, **Magda**	Barracks
**Four**	**Patrycja**, Zuza	Hippies

- Names in **bold** represent eliminated semi-finalists

The remaining semi-finalists are narrowed down to the final thirteen, and the remaining models begin their trip to the top model home.

=== Episode 4 ===
Original Air Date: 29 September 2010

The final thirteen are picked up and driven to their new home in Warsaw. All of the girls appear very impressed, but Zuza begins to clash with Ania. The following day, Ania wakes up in the morning and feels that all the drama has been resolved. The girls are later rushed to their second location.

They arrive at the hair salon where their makeovers will take place. There they met Polish model Anja Rubik. Marta receives the most drastic change, going from long locks of hair to a short blond pixie cut. She manages to embrace her make over well. Emilia has major issues with her makeover. As soon as she realizes how much the hairdresser is going to cut off, she frustratedly walks out of the salon before coming back in again.

After the make overs, the girls are driven to meet a special guest, Łukasz Jemioł, a very talented designer who has dressed Anja Rubik herself. He explains to the girls that they will all have to walk in his fashion show while holding onto shopping bags. Due to the narrow runway, many girls slip and tumble when passing other girls by. Weronika is heavily criticized due to taking too long between changes. After the challenge, the girls meet up with the editor-in-chief of Glamour Magazine in Poland, Anna Jurgas. Paulina Pa. is revealed to be the challenge winner. She gets to shoot for Glamour.

- Challenge winner: Paulina Papierska

The following day, the girls meet up with their photographer Robert Wolański, who explains that they will be doing a beauty shoot with deadly animals and reptiles. Kasia is praised for her performance with the snake, while Ania does a good job with her tarantula. Emilia initially struggles with the cockroaches.

At panel, the final thirteen contestants must face the judges for the first elimination. Paulina Ps. receives positive feedback for continuing to do the shoot despite her fear of the insect. Sonia is rushed to the hospital, and subsequently misses the remainder of the elimination ceremony. Ania, Marta and Zuza land in the bottom three. Ania and Marta are given another chance, while Zuza is sent home.

- First call-out: Beata Szarłowska
- Bottom three: Ania Piszczałka, Marta Szulawiak & Zuza Walkowiak
- Eliminated: Zuza Walkowiak
- Featured photographer: Robert Wolański
- Special guests: Lukasz Jemiol, Wojtek Rostowski, Ania Jurgas

=== Episode 5 ===
Original Air Date: 6 October 2010

After Zuza's elimination, a physical test of grace proves too hard for some. During the photo shoot, the contestants must portray the different sides between various social and political issues.

Political issue	Stance	
Political issue	For	Against
Abortion	Emilia	Sonia
Deforestation	Weronika	Beata
Fur farming	Paulina Pa.	Paulina Ps.
Gay marriage	Ania	Marta
Guns	Kasia	Nicole
Meat	Ola	Pamela

Ola, Beata, Nicole and Paulina Pa. excel during their sessions. They also receive positive feedback at panel.

During elimination, Ola receives best photo. Emilia, Pamela and Sonia land in the bottom three. Emilia is declared safe. Joanna hands the last photo to Pamela, and Sonia is eliminated from the competition.

- First call-out: Ola Kuligowska
- Bottom three: Emilia Pietras, Pamela Jedziniak & Sonia Wesołowska
- Eliminated: Sonia Wesołowska

=== Episode 6 ===
Original Air Date: 13 October 2010

The models must pose nude in a black and white photo shoot while they pose with miscellaneous fashion items.

Model	Item
Ania	Clutch
Beata	Hat
Emilia	Panties
Kasia	Scarf
Marta	Glasses
Nicole	High heel
Ola	Vest
Pamela	Bracelet
Paulina Pa.	Skirt
Paulina Ps.	Necklace
Weronika	Ring

At panel, Kasia receives best photo. Emilia, Pamela and Paulina Ps. are called forward as the bottom three. Emilia and Pamela are saved once again, and Paulina's declining performance gets her sent home.

- First call-out: Kasia Smolińska
- Bottom three: Emilia Pietras, Pamela Jedziniak & Paulina Pszech
- Eliminated: Paulina Pszech
- Featured photographer: Wojciech Witczak

=== Episode 7 ===
Original Air Date: 20 October 2010

The models arrive home after Paulina Ps.' elimination, and find Kasia's photo mounted on the television screen. Weronika is saddened after she finds a note from Paulina when she gets to her room. The following morning, Dawid drops by the house to wake up all the girls for a catwalk and styling lesson. Despite her incredible look, Beata comes under fire for her messy outfits. Dawid helps her and several other girls rearrange their wardrobe. Later in the day, the contestants meet creative consultant Simon Mayeski for a designing challenge in which they will use the information they learned during the lesson to create outfits from multiple fabrics. For having created the best ensembles, Emilia and Ania are chosen as the challenge winners.

- Challenge winners: Ania Piszczałka & Emilia Pietras

For the photo shoot, the girls must switch genders for a drag themed session. Immediately after her session, Nicole is taken to the hospital due to pain on her left leg. The doctor reveals that she is suffering from a knee effusion. Under the recommendation of the doctor, she sees herself forced to withdraw from the competition. Upon returning to the set, she reveals to the girls that she must quit the competition. She says her goodbyes and returns to the house to pack her belongings.

- Quit: Nicole Rosłoniec

After the photo shoot is over, Paulina is rewarded with a shopping spree for having performed the best on set.

- Challenge winner: Paulina Papierska

During deliberation, Emilia, Paulina and Ania receive the best feedback. Ola, Beata, Pamela and Kasia receive the heaviest critique. Ania is awarded best photo during elimination, while Kasia, Ola and Pamela are called forward as the bottom three. The former two are given another chance, and Joanna eliminates Pamela.

- First call-out: Ania Piszczałka
- Bottom three: Kasia Smolińska, Ola Kuligowska & Pamela Jedziniak
- Eliminated: Pamela Jedziniak
- Featured photographers: Sebastian Siębor & Alicja Wesołowska
- Special guests: Simon Mayeski

=== Episode 8 ===
Original Air Date: 27 October 2010

After the models have had breakfast, they receive a message from Joanna stating that due to Nicole's departure the previous episode, a new model would be arriving at the house to replace her. Previously eliminated semi-finalist Magda later enters the model home. Many of the girls are displeased with her arrival.

- Entered: Magda Swat

Later in the day, Anja Rubik drops by the house to talk to the models about her experiences as a model. She holds a mock casting with each contestant, giving them feedback after reviewing their walks and portfolios. Beata is critiqued on her proportions, while Paulina is quickly dismissed due to her inability to speak French or English. Kasia and Magda are singled out as having done the best. Paulina is singled out as the worst.

That night all the girls are treated for a night out. On their way to the venue, it is revealed that they will have to talk with and impress several important people, including various designers and magazine editors in addition to male model Sasha Knezevic and Lucyna Szymanska, head of D'Vision models. Their goal is to hand out several of their business cards in exchange for the identity of each guest.

After identifying several of the people there, each model meets with the guests for an individual interview. Magda is called out on interrupting others while speaking, while Ania is reprimanded for having invaded other people's personal space. Weronika is told that it is inappropriate to discuss personal problems with someone she doesn't know in a formal setting. Beata, Ola and Katrzyna do the best job handling themselves while talking to each guest. For having impressed the most with her knowledge and charisma, and having identified the most guests, Kasia is declared as the challenge winner.

- Challenge winner: Kasia Smolińska

For the photo shoot, the models must pose topless to create an 'ice' beauty shot while wearing jewelry from Apart. Magda is shot first, taking part in her first official photo shoot session. Ola does extremely well during her session, and most of the girls receive positive comments from the photographer. Anja helps Paulina with her confidence after her poor week in the competition.

At panel, Magda, Ola, Paulina and Emilia all receive positive feed back. Ania is told she looks like the cookie monster, while Weronika and Marta receive heavy criticism for their lukewarm photos.

Ola is awarded best picture. As a result, she is given the chance to shoot Apart's newest campaign.

- Challenge winner: Ola Kuligowska

Ania, Marta and Weronika are called forward as the bottom three. Joanna hands the last two photos to Ania and Weronika, and Marta is asked to leave the competition.

- First call-out: Ola Kuligowska
- Bottom three: Ania Piszczałka, Marta Szulawiak & Weronika Lewicka
- Eliminated: Marta Szulawiak
- Featured photographer: Aldona Karczmarczyk
- Special guests: Anja Rubik, Iza Bartosz, Marcin Brzozowski, Mariusz Paprocki, Rodrigo De La Garza, Sasha Knezevic, Lucyna Szymanska

=== Episode 9 ===
Original Air Date: 3 November 2010

Model	Movie
Ania	Tomb Raider
Beata	The Seven Year Itch
Emilia	Psycho
Kasia	Basic Instinct
Magda	Tarzan
Ola	American Beauty
Paulina Pa.	Another 9½ Weeks
Weronika	Dirty Dancing

- First call-out: Paulina Papierska
- Bottom four: Emilia Pietras, Kasia Smolińska, Magda Swat & Weronika Lewicka
- Eliminated: Emilia Pietras
- Featured photographer: Szymon Brodziak

=== Episode 10 ===
Original Air Date: 10 November 2010

- First call-out: Weronika Lewicka
- Bottom three: Ania Piszczałka, Magda Swat & Paulina Papierska
- Eliminated: Magda Swat

=== Episode 11 ===
Original Air Date: 17 November 2010

- First call-out: Kasia Smolińska
- Bottom three: Beata Szarłowska, Paulina Papierska & Weronika Lewicka
- Eliminated: Beata Szarłowska

=== Episode 12 ===
Original Air Date: 24 November 2010

- Eliminated outside of judging panel: Weronika Lewicka
- First call-out: Ola Kuligowska
- Bottom two: Kasia Smolińska & Paulina Papierska
- Eliminated: Kasia Smolińska
- Featured photographer: Fulvio Maiani

=== Episode 13 ===
Original Air Date: 1 December 2010

- Final three: Ania Piszczałka, Ola Kuligowska & Paulina Papierska
- Eliminated: Ania Piszczałka
- Final two: Ola Kuligowska & Paulina Papierska
- Poland's Next Top Model: Paulina Papierska

== Summaries ==
=== Call-out order ===
Order	Episodes											
Order	3	4	5	6	7	8	9	10	11	12	13	
1	Weronika	Beata	Ola	Kasia	Ania	Ola	Paulina Pa.	Weronika	Kasia	Ola	Ola	Paulina Pa.
2	Pamela	Sonia	Beata	Ania	Emilia	Paulina Pa.	Ania	Ola	Ola	Ania	Paulina Pa.	Ola
3	Emilia	Nicole	Nicole	Ola	Paulina Pa.	Emilia	Ola	Beata	Ania	Paulina Pa.	Ania	
4	Sonia	Paulina Ps.	Paulina Pa.	Nicole	Marta	Beata	Beata	Kasia	Paulina Pa.	Kasia		
5	Marta	Kasia	Kasia	Marta	Weronika	Magda	Magda	Ania	Weronika	Weronika		
6	Paulina Pa.	Weronika	Paulina Ps.	Paulina Pa.	Beata	Kasia	Kasia	Paulina Pa.	Beata			
7	Ola	Ola	Marta	Beata	Kasia	Ania	Weronika	Magda				
8	Nicole	Emilia	Weronika	Weronika	Ola	Weronika	Emilia					
9	Paulina Ps.	Paulina Pa.	Ania	Emilia	Pamela	Marta						
10	Ania	Pamela	Emilia	Pamela	Nicole							
11	Beata	Ania	Pamela	Paulina Ps.								
12	Kasia	Marta	Sonia									
13	Zuza	Zuza										

The contestant was eliminated
The contestant quit the competition
The contestant was eliminated outside of judging panel
The contestant won the competition

- Episodes 1, 2, and 3 were casting episodes. In episode 3, the pool of 50 semi-finalists was reduced to the 13 models who moved on to the main competition.
- In episode 4, Sonia had to be rushed to the hospital. When Beata was called forward to receive her photo, Joanna handed her Sonia's picture.
- Episode 5's call-out order was changed by editing: Kasia & Paulina Ps. were switched.
- In episode 7, Nicole quit the competition after the photo shoot due to a knee contusion. She was replaced by Magda, who had originally been cut in the semi-finals the following episode.
- In episode 8, Beata's call-out was omitted.
- In episode 12, Weronika was eliminated outside of judging panel.

=== Photo shoot guide ===
- Episode 3 photo shoot: Army boot camp in groups (semifinals)
- Episode 4 photo shoot: Beauty shots with insects
- Episode 5 photo shoot: Embodying political issues
- Episode 6 photo shoot:: Nude with accessories in B&W
- Episode 7 photo shoot: Gender swap with a drag queen
- Episode 8 photo shoot: Ice beauty shots with jewelry
- Episode 9 photo shoot: Re-enacting famous movie scenes
- Episode 10 photo shoot: Posing with a male model
- Episode 11 commercial: Pantene shampoo
- Episode 12 photo shoot: In the streets of Milan with male models
- Episode 13 photo shoots: Blend A Med; Glamour magazine covers; Max Factor commercials; posing underwater

== Rating figures ==
Episode	Date	Official rating 4+	Share 4+	Share 16–39
1	8 September 2010	2 019 365	15,55%	17,88%
2	15 September 2010	2 621 773	19,09%	23,45%
3	22 September 2010	2 495 414	19,45%	23,09%
4	29 September 2010	2 889 786	21,06%	26,54%
5	6 October 2010	2 553 756	19,21%	22,16%
6	13 October 2010	2 622 122	19,77%	23,45%
7	20 October 2010	2 705 559	19,95%	24,28%
8	27 October 2010	2 758 056	19,89%	24,58%
9	3 November 2010	2 522 787	19,07%	23,69%
10	10 November 2010	2 233 013	15,94%	20,51%
11	17 November 2010	2 147 477	14,81%	18,76%
12	24 November 2010	2 787 763	19,91%	24,97%
13	1 December 2010	2 630 517	20,06%	22,88%
Average		2 542 646	18,80%	22,80%
