= Zbylutów =

- Village
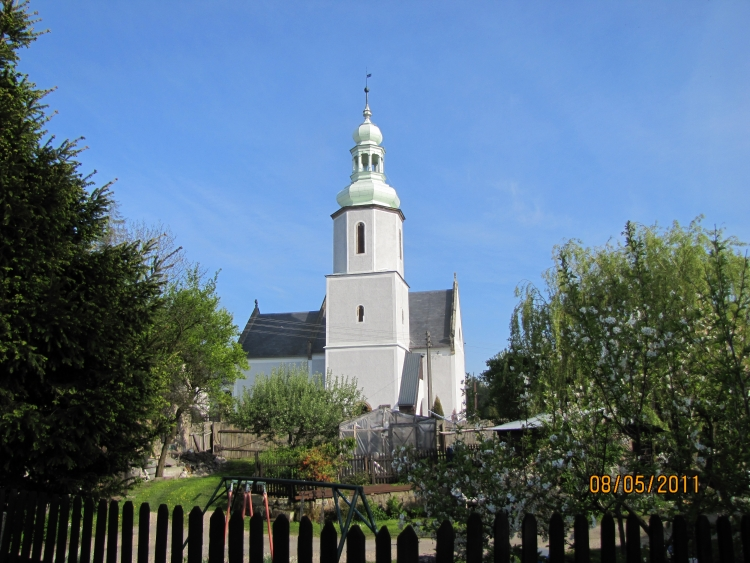
- Church of the Assumption of Mary in Zbylutów

- Location within Poland
- Coordinates: 51°8′N 15°39′E
- Country: Poland
- Voivodeship: Lower Silesian
- County: Lwówek
- Gmina: Lwówek Śląski
- Time zone: UTC+1 (CET)
  - Summer (DST): UTC+2 (CEST)
- Vehicle registration: DLW

Zbylutów [zbɨˈlutuf] is a village in the administrative district of Gmina Lwówek Śląski, within Lwówek County, Lower Silesian Voivodeship, in south-western Poland.

== History ==
The village was first mentioned in the 13th century, when it was part of Piast-ruled Poland. In 1223 Polish monarch Henry the Bearded granted the village to the monastery in Trzebnica. In the 18th century it was annexed by Prussia, and from 1871 to 1945 it also formed part of Germany. During World War II, a German forced labour subcamp of the prison in Jawor was operated in the village. After the defeat of Nazi Germany in the war in 1945, the village became again part of Poland.
