= MOIS =

MOIS or Mois may refer to:

== Initialisms ==
- Ministry of the Interior and Safety (South Korea)
- Ministry of Intelligence (Iran)

== People ==
- Aurel Moiș (born 1948), Romanian ice hockey player
- Dorel Moiș (born 1975), Romanian aerobic gymnast
- Jüri Mõis (born 1956), Estonian politician
- Mois Benarroch (born 1959), Moroccan-Israeli poet, translator and novelist

== Places ==
- German name for the village of Mojesz in Silesia
