= Chmielno, Lower Silesian Voivodeship =

Chmielno
- Village
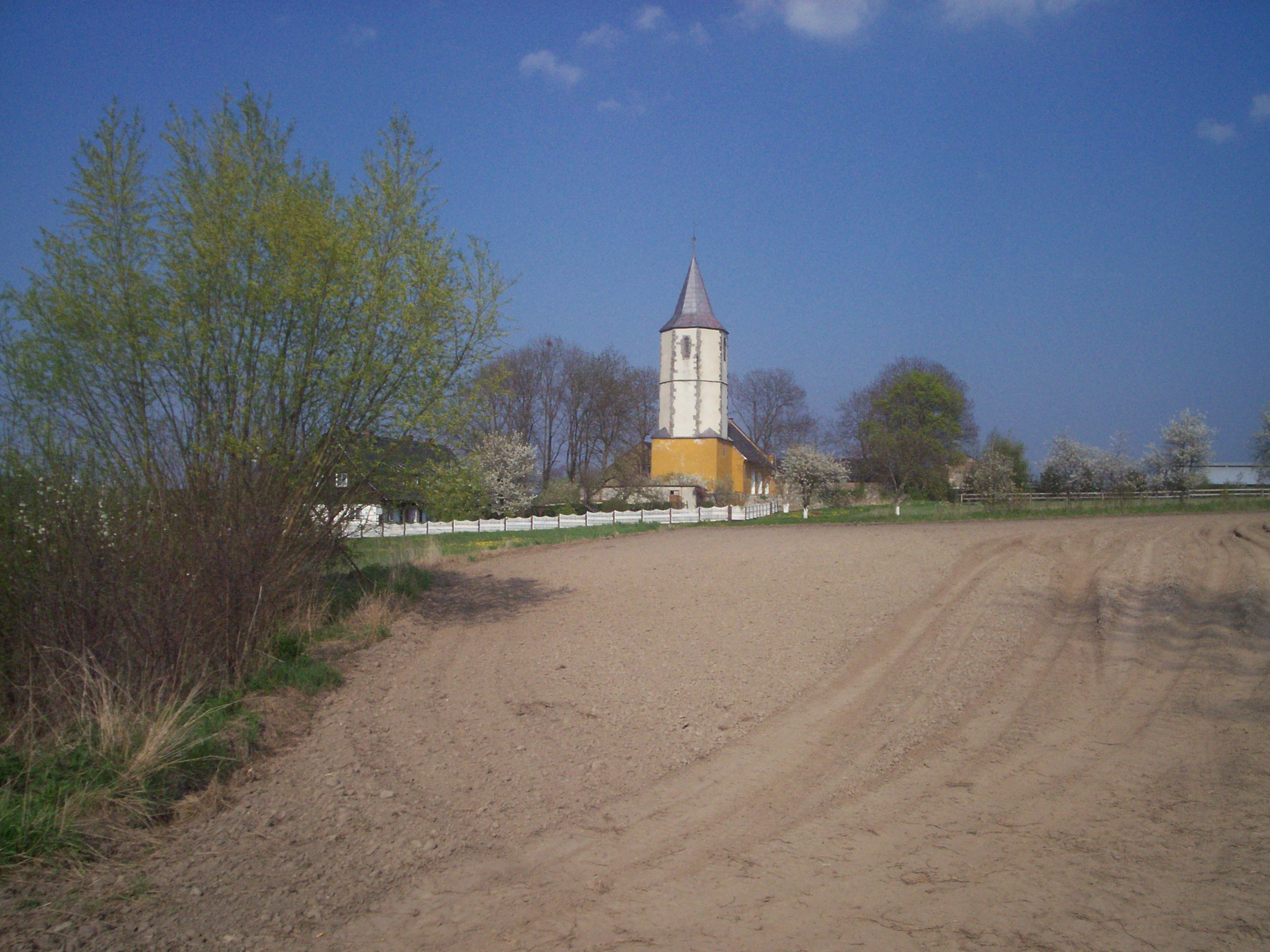

- Location within Poland
- Coordinates: 51°08′29″N 15°36′39″E
- Country: Poland
- Voivodeship: Lower Silesian
- County: Lwówek
- Gmina: Lwówek Śląski

Chmielno [ˈxmjɛlnɔ] is a village in the administrative district of Gmina Lwówek Śląski, within Lwówek County, Lower Silesian Voivodeship, in south-western Poland.
