= Sobota, Lower Silesian Voivodeship =

Sobota
- Village
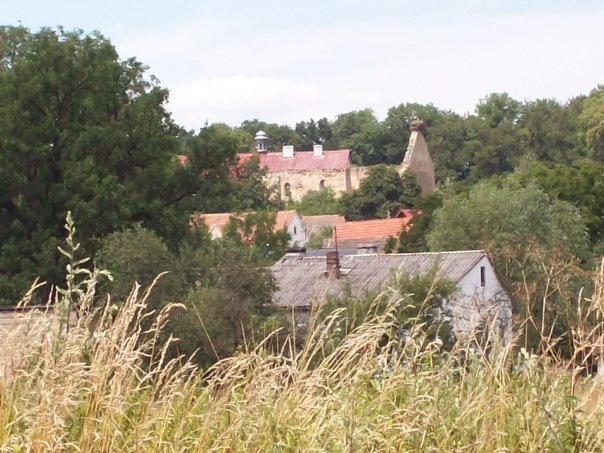
- View towards the village with the ruins of the Romanesque church in the background

- Location within Poland
- Coordinates: 51°5′N 15°40′E
- Country: Poland
- Voivodeship: Lower Silesian
- County: Lwówek
- Gmina: Lwówek Śląski

Sobota [sɔˈbɔta] (German: Zobten am Bober) is a village in the administrative district of Gmina Lwówek Śląski, within Lwówek County, Lower Silesian Voivodeship, in south-western Poland.
