= Skała, Lwówek County =

Skała
- Village
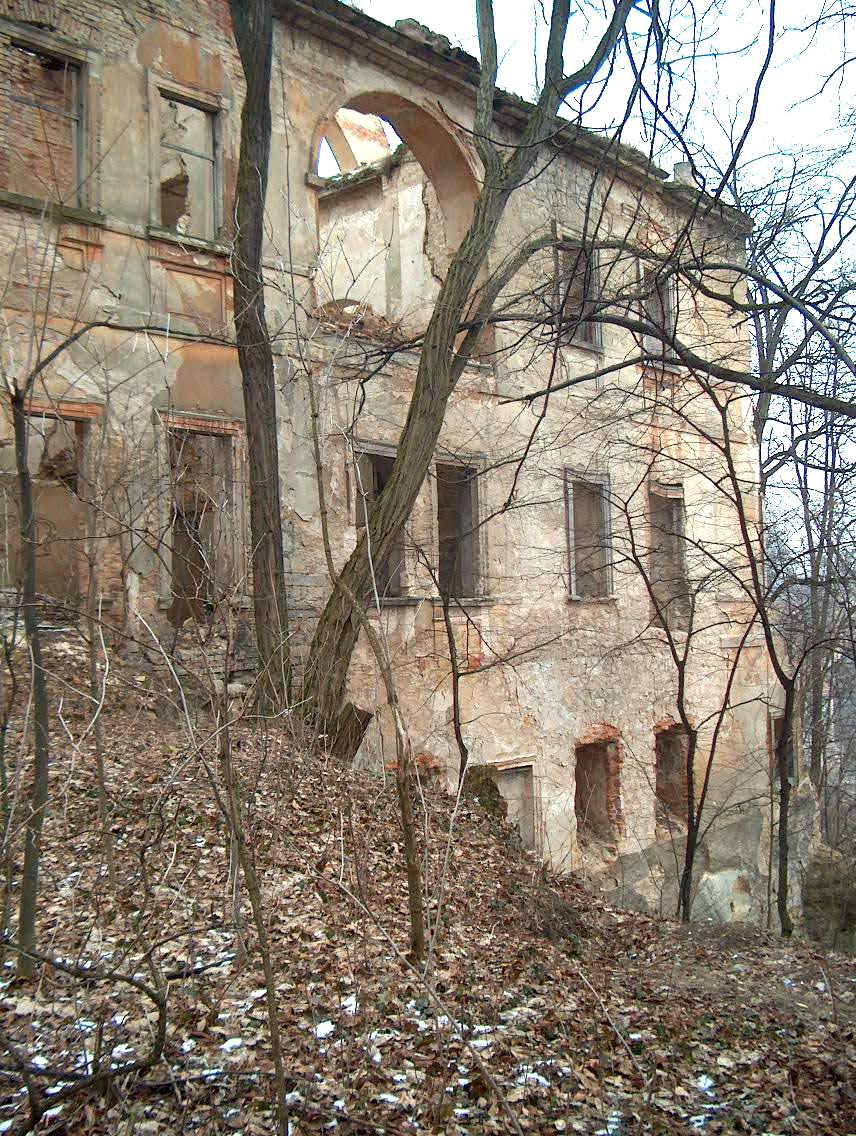

- Location within Poland
- Coordinates: 51°9′27″N 15°35′28″E
- Country: Poland
- Voivodeship: Lower Silesian
- County: Lwówek
- Gmina: Lwówek Śląski

Skała [ˈskawa] is a village in the administrative district of Gmina Lwówek Śląski, within Lwówek County, Lower Silesian Voivodeship, in south-western Poland.
