= Gmina Lwówek Śląski =

Gmina Lwówek Śląski Lwówek Śląski Commune
- Gmina
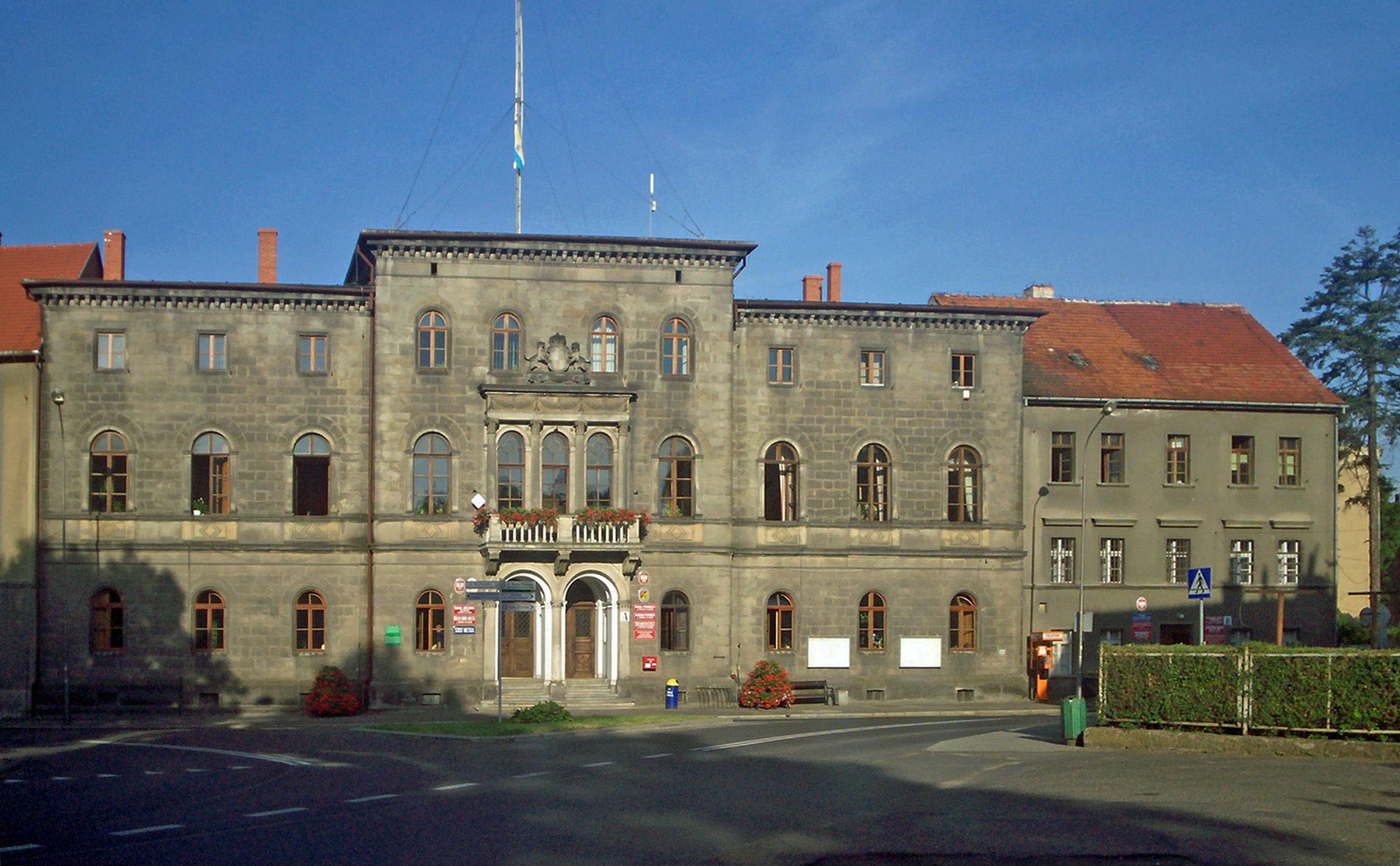
- Gmina office in Lwówek Śląski

- Flag Coat of arms
- Interactive map of Gmina Lwówek Śląski
- Coordinates (Lwówek Śląski): 51°07′N 15°35′E
- Country: Poland
- Voivodeship: Lower Silesian
- County: Lwówek
- Seat: Lwówek Śląski
- Sołectwos: Bielanka, Brunów, Chmielno, Dębowy Gaj, Dłużec, Dworek, Gaszów, Górczyca, Gradówek, Kotliska, Mojesz, Nagórze, Niwnice, Pieszków, Płóczki Dolne, Płóczki Górne, Radłówka, Radomiłowice, Rakowice Małe, Rakowice Wielkie, Skała, Skorzynice, Sobota, Ustronie, Włodzice Małe, Włodzice Wielkie, Zbylutów, Żerkowice

Area
  - Total: 240.37 km^{2} (92.81 sq mi)

Population (2019-06-30)
  - Total: 17,239
  - Density: 71.719/km^{2} (185.75/sq mi)
  - Urban: 8,869
  - Rural: 8,370
- Time zone: UTC+1 (CET)
  - Summer (DST): UTC+2 (CEST)
- Vehicle registration: DLW
- Website: http://www.lwowekslaski.pl

Gmina Lwówek Śląski is an urban-rural gmina (administrative district) in Lwówek County, Lower Silesian Voivodeship, in south-western Poland. Its seat is the town of Lwówek Śląski, which lies approximately 102 kilometres (63 mi) west of the regional capital Wrocław.

The gmina covers an area of 240.37 square kilometres (92.8 sq mi), and as of 2019 its total population is 17,239.

== Neighbouring gminas ==
Gmina Lwówek Śląski is bordered by the gminas of Bolesławiec, Gryfów Śląski, Lubomierz, Nowogrodziec, Pielgrzymka, Warta Bolesławiecka and Wleń.

== Villages ==
Apart from the town of Lwówek Śląski, the gmina contains the villages of Bielanka, Brunów, Chmielno, Dębowy Gaj, Dłużec, Dworek, Gaszów, Górczyca, Gradówek, Kotliska, Mojesz, Nagórze, Niwnice, Pieszków, Płóczki Dolne, Płóczki Górne, Radłówka, Radomiłowice, Rakowice Małe, Rakowice Wielkie, Skała, Skorzynice, Sobota, Ustronie, Włodzice Małe, Włodzice Wielkie, Zbylutów and Żerkowice.

== Twin towns – sister cities ==
Gmina Lwówek Śląski is twinned with:

- Chrastava, Czech Republic
- Heidenau, Germany
- Lwówek, Poland
- Noidans-lès-Vesoul, France
- Velký Šenov, Czech Republic
- Wilthen, Germany
