= Mojesz =

- Village
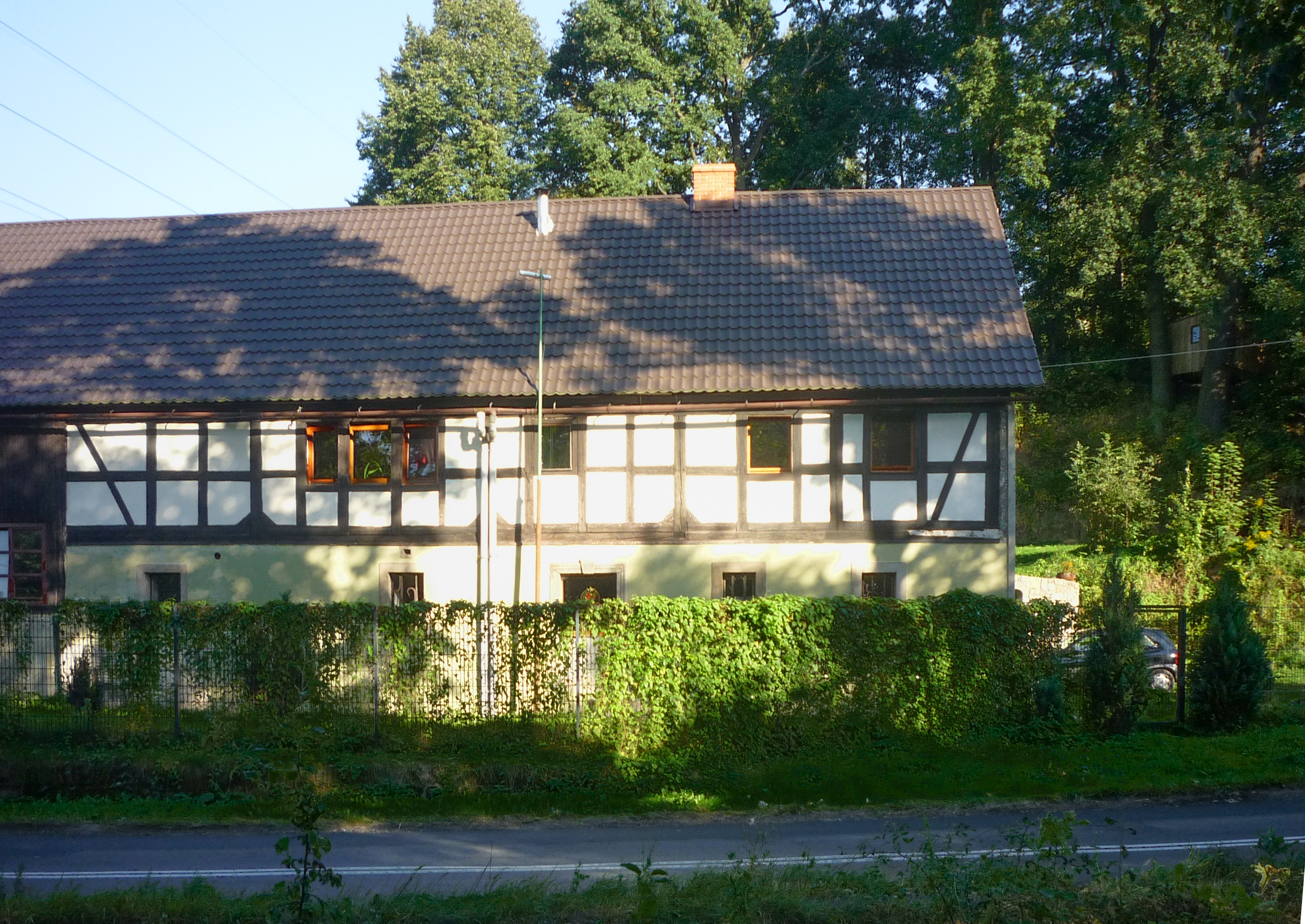
- 19th-century house in Mojesz

- Location within Poland
- Coordinates: 51°05′31″N 15°35′46″E
- Country: Poland
- Voivodeship: Lower Silesian
- County: Lwówek
- Gmina: Lwówek Śląski

Mojesz ([ˈmɔjɛʂ], German: Mois) is a village in the administrative district of Gmina Lwówek Śląski, within Lwówek County, Lower Silesian Voivodeship, in south-western Poland.
