= Pieszków, Lwówek County =

Pieszków
- Village
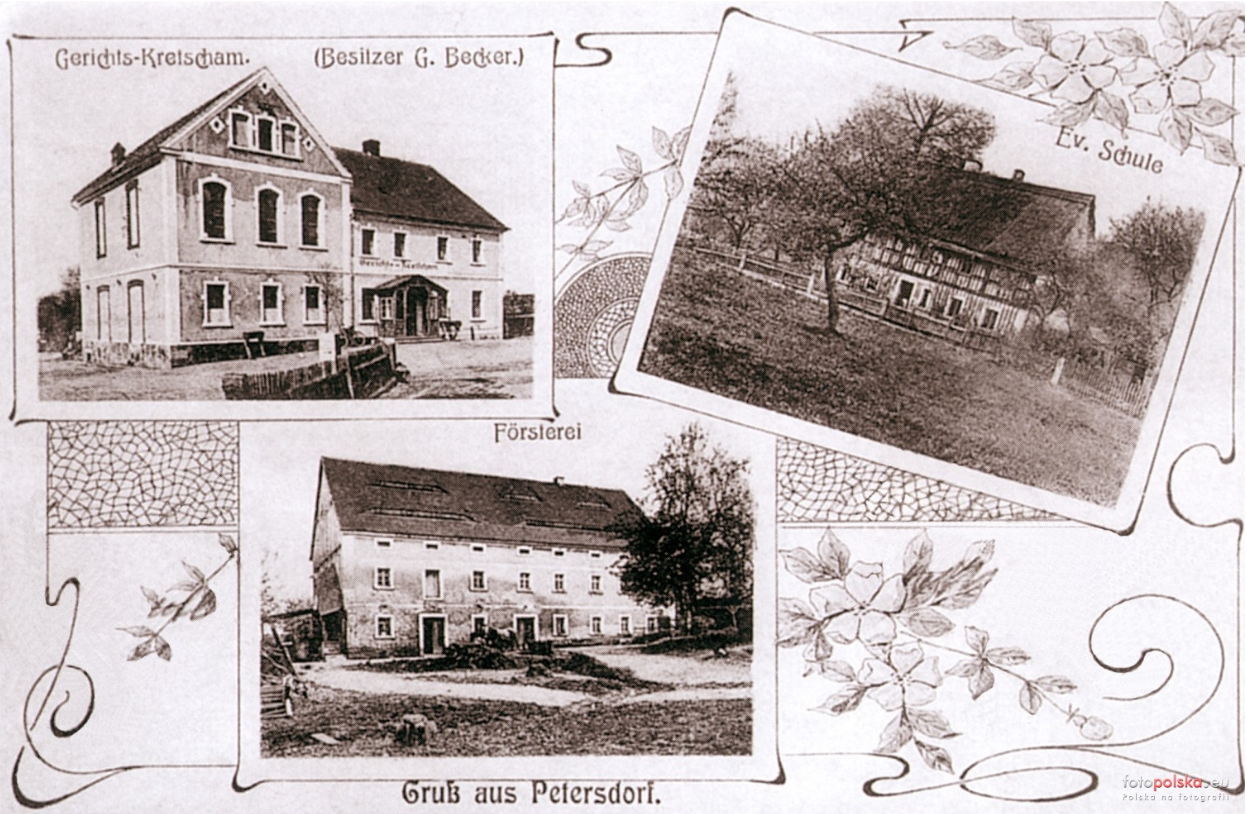

- Location within Poland
- Coordinates: 51°06′24″N 15°41′24″E
- Country: Poland
- Voivodeship: Lower Silesian
- County: Lwówek
- Gmina: Lwówek Śląski

Pieszków [ˈpjɛʂkuf] is a village in the administrative district of Gmina Lwówek Śląski, within Lwówek County, Lower Silesian Voivodeship, in south-western Poland.
