= Gradówek =

- Village
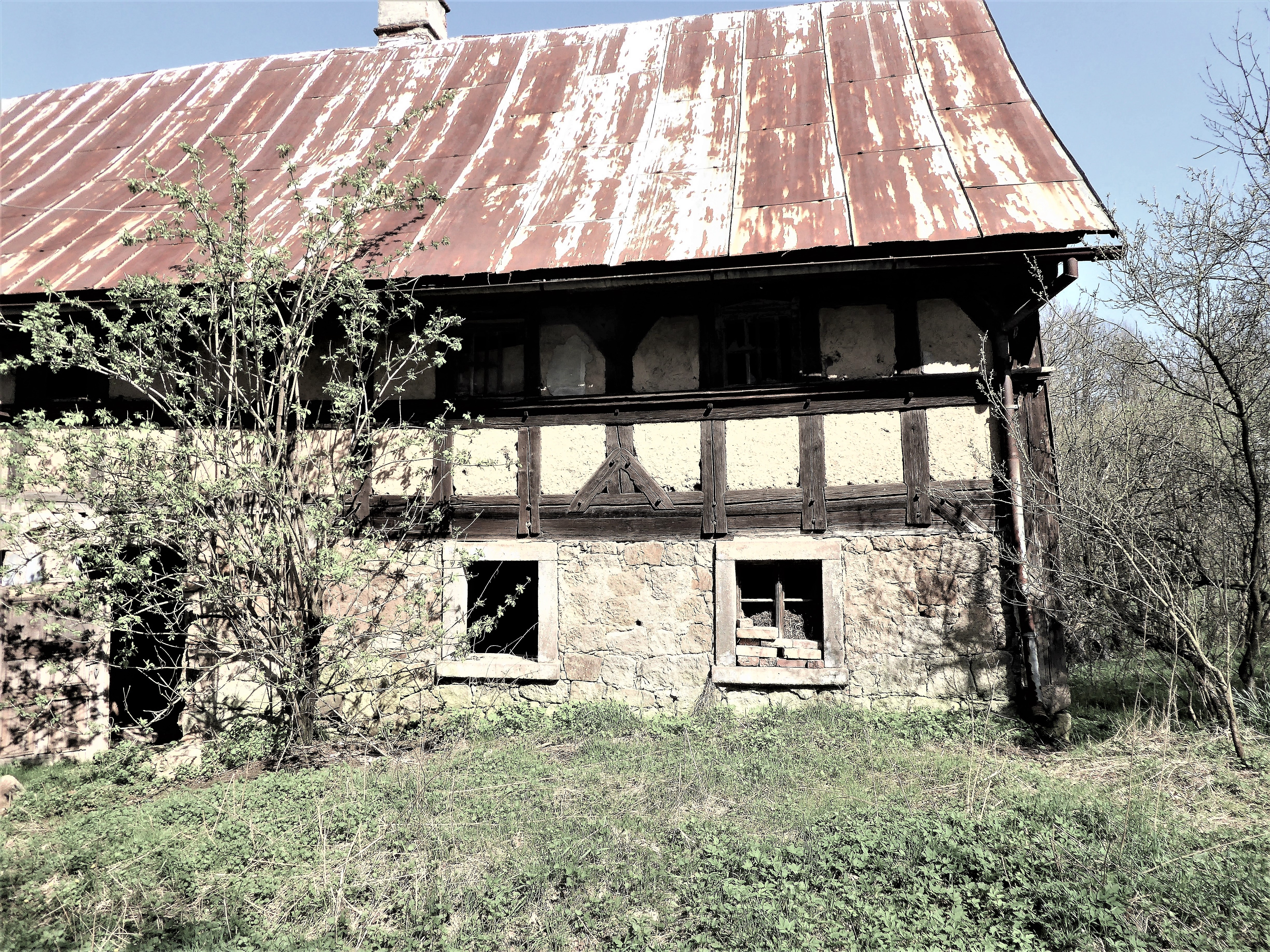

- Location within Poland
- Coordinates: 51°05′34″N 15°28′39″E
- Country: Poland
- Voivodeship: Lower Silesian
- County: Lwówek
- Gmina: Lwówek Śląski
- Population: 220

Gradówek [ɡraˈduvɛk] is a village in the administrative district of Gmina Lwówek Śląski, within Lwówek County, Lower Silesian Voivodeship, in south-western Poland.
