= Rakowice Małe =

- Village
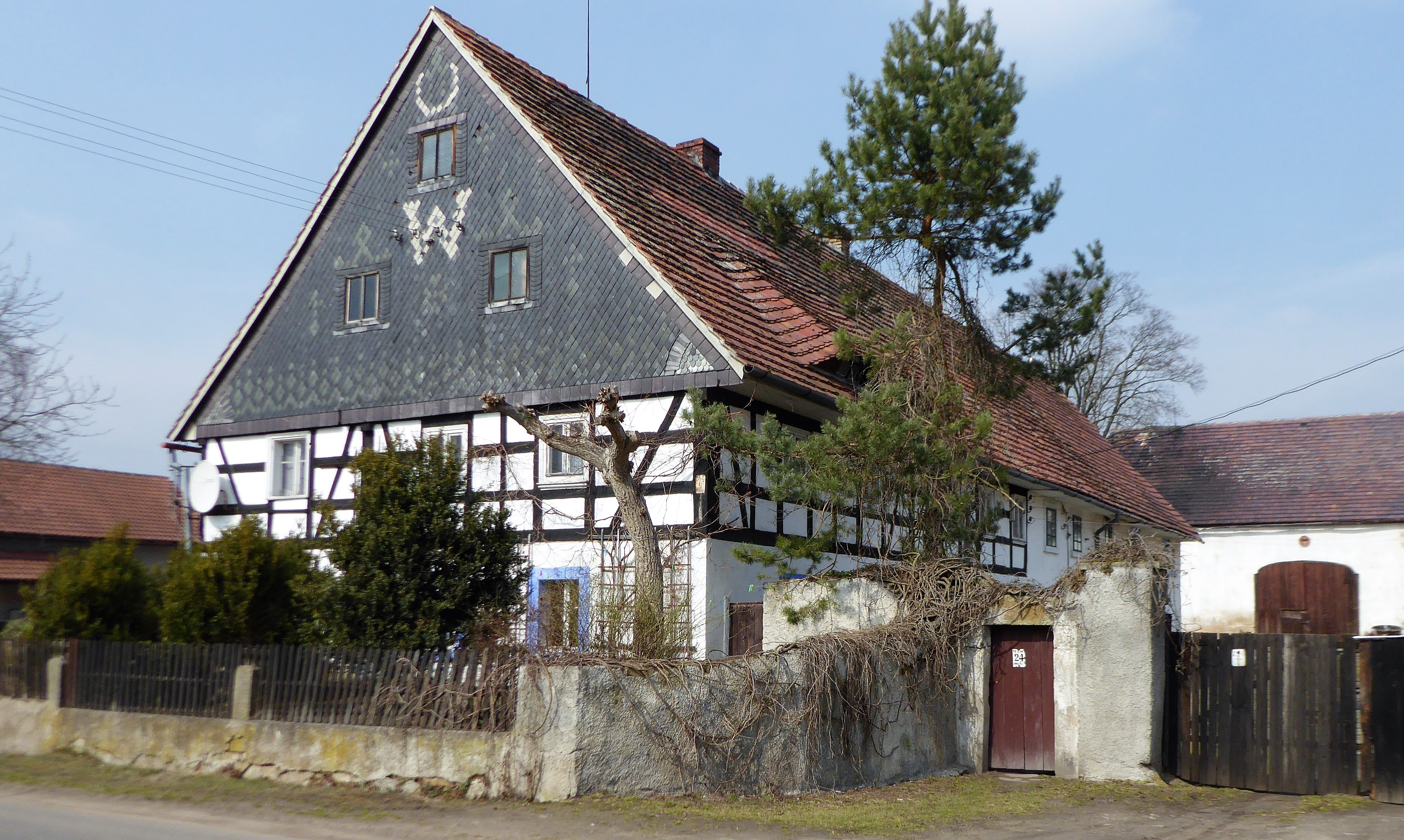

- Location within Poland
- Coordinates: 51°9′N 15°33′E
- Country: Poland
- Voivodeship: Lower Silesian
- County: Lwówek
- Gmina: Lwówek Śląski
- Vehicle registration: DLW

Rakowice Małe [rakɔˈvit͡sɛ ˈmawɛ] is a village in the administrative district of Gmina Lwówek Śląski, within Lwówek County, Lower Silesian Voivodeship, in south-western Poland.

The name of the village is of Polish origin and comes from the word rak, which means "crayfish".
