= Rakowice Wielkie =

- Village
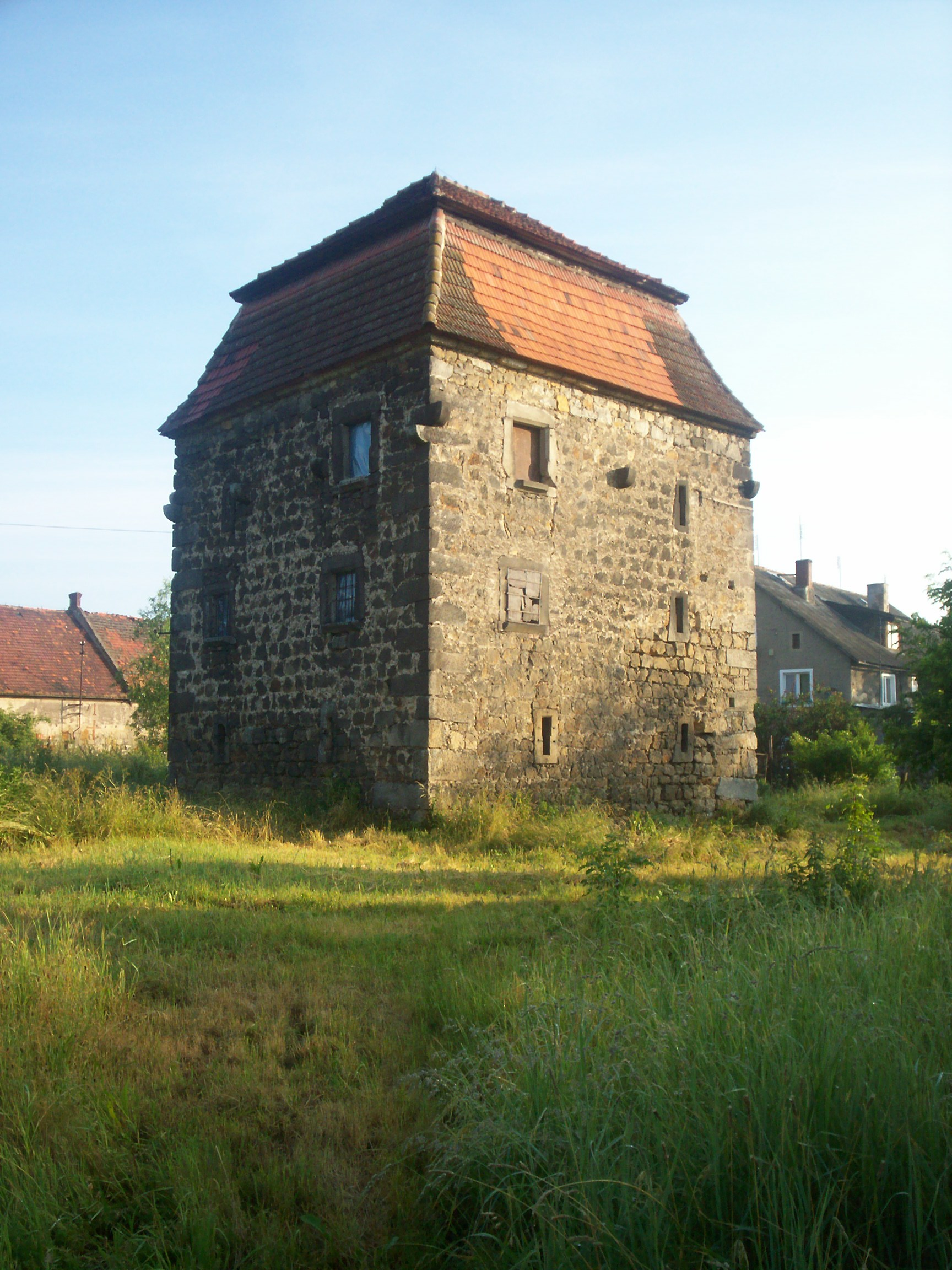
- Medieval knight's tower in Rakowice Wielkie

- Location within Poland
- Coordinates: 51°8′N 15°33′E
- Country: Poland
- Voivodeship: Lower Silesian
- County: Lwówek
- Gmina: Lwówek Śląski
- Time zone: UTC+1 (CET)
  - Summer (DST): UTC+2 (CEST)
- Vehicle registration: DLW

Rakowice Wielkie [rakɔˈvit͡sɛ ˈvjɛlkʲɛ] is a village in the administrative district of Gmina Lwówek Śląski, within Lwówek County, Lower Silesian Voivodeship, in south-western Poland.

The name of the village is of Polish origin and comes from the word rak, which means "crayfish".
