= Lwówek County =

Lwówek County Powiat lwówecki
- County
- Flag Coat of arms

- Location within the voivodeship
- Coordinates: 51°7′N 15°35′E
- Country: Poland
- Voivodeship: Lower Silesian
- Seat: Lwówek Śląski
- Gminas: Total 5: Gmina Gryfów Śląski; Gmina Lubomierz; Gmina Lwówek Śląski; Gmina Mirsk; Gmina Wleń

Area
  - Total: 709.94 km^{2} (274.11 sq mi)

Population (2019-06-30)
  - Total: 45,975
  - Density: 64.759/km^{2} (167.73/sq mi)
  - Urban: 23,129
  - Rural: 22,846
- Car plates: DLW
- Website: powiatlwowecki.pl

Lwówek County (Polish: powiat lwówecki) is a unit of territorial administration and local government (powiat) in Lower Silesian Voivodeship, south-western Poland. It came into being on January 1, 1999, as a result of the Polish local government reforms passed in 1998. The county covers an area of 709.9 square kilometres (274.1 sq mi). Its administrative seat is the town of Lwówek Śląski, and it also contains the towns of Gryfów Śląski, Mirsk, Wleń and Lubomierz.

As of 2019 the total population of the county is 45,975, the most populated towns are Lwówek Śląski with 8,869 inhabitants and Gryfów Śląski with 6,636 inhabitants.

== Neighbouring counties ==
Lwówek County is bordered by Lubań County to the west, Bolesławiec County to the north, Złotoryja County to the east and Karkonosze County to the south. It also borders the Czech Republic to the south.

== Administrative divisions ==
The county is subdivided into five gminas (all of them urban-rural, centred on the five towns). These are listed in the following table, in descending order of population.

Gmina	Type	Area (km^{2})	Population (2019)	Seat
Gmina Lwówek Śląski	urban-rural	240.4	17,239	Lwówek Śląski
Gmina Gryfów Śląski	urban-rural	66.6	9,697	Gryfów Śląski
Gmina Mirsk	urban-rural	186.6	8,622	Mirsk
Gmina Lubomierz	urban-rural	130.4	6,192	Lubomierz
Gmina Wleń	urban-rural	86.0	4,225	Wleń
