= Mirsk–Świeradów Nadleśnictwo railway =

Railway line in Poland

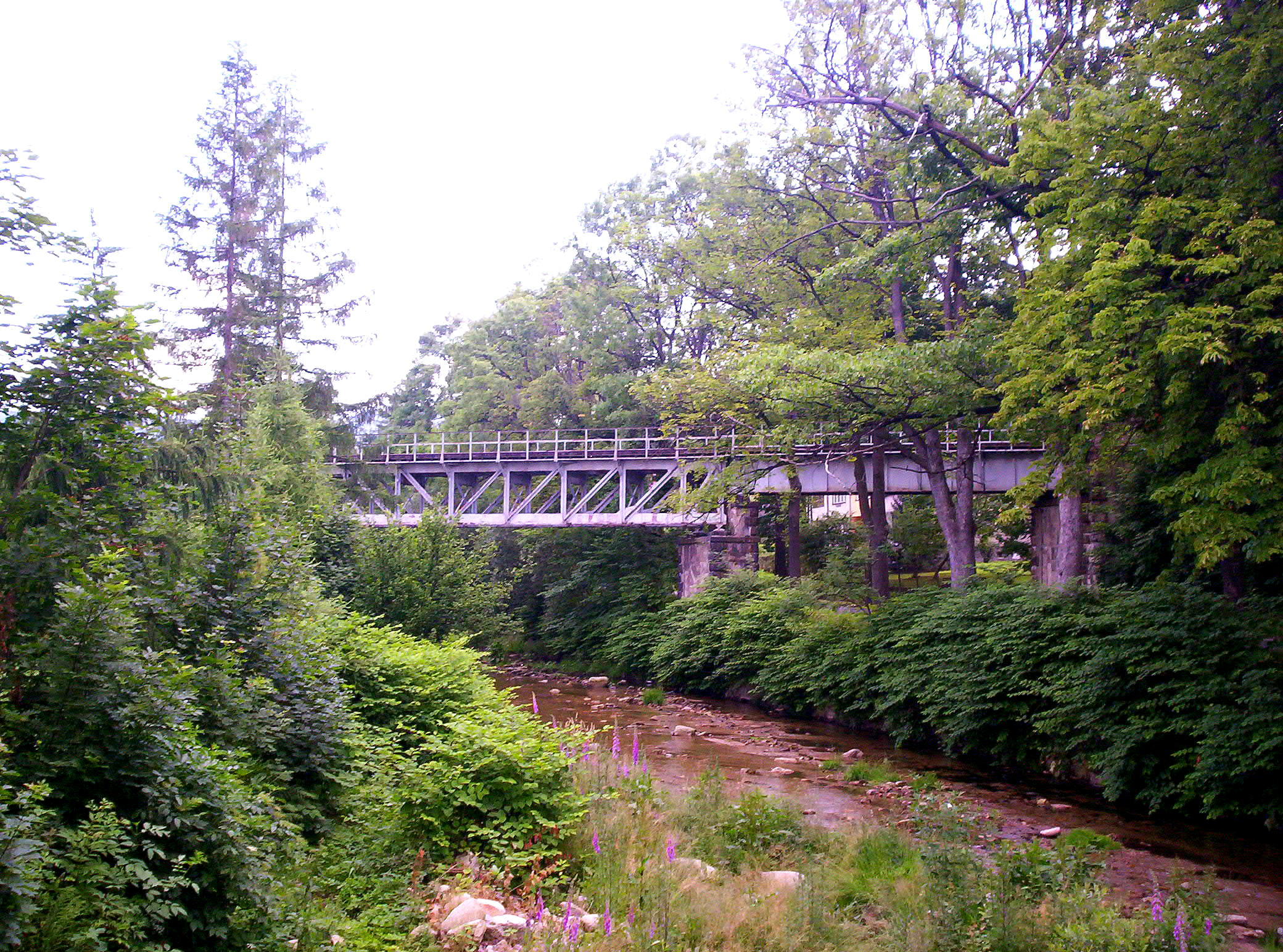
- Bridge over Kwisa river

Overview
- Owner: Polish State Railways
- Line number: 336
- Termini: Mirsk; Świeradów Nadleśnictwo

History
- Opened: 1910
- Closed: 1996 (passenger); 1998 (freight)

Technical
- Line length: 11.011 km (6.842 mi)
- Track gauge: 1,435 mm (4 ft 8 1/2 in)
Route map
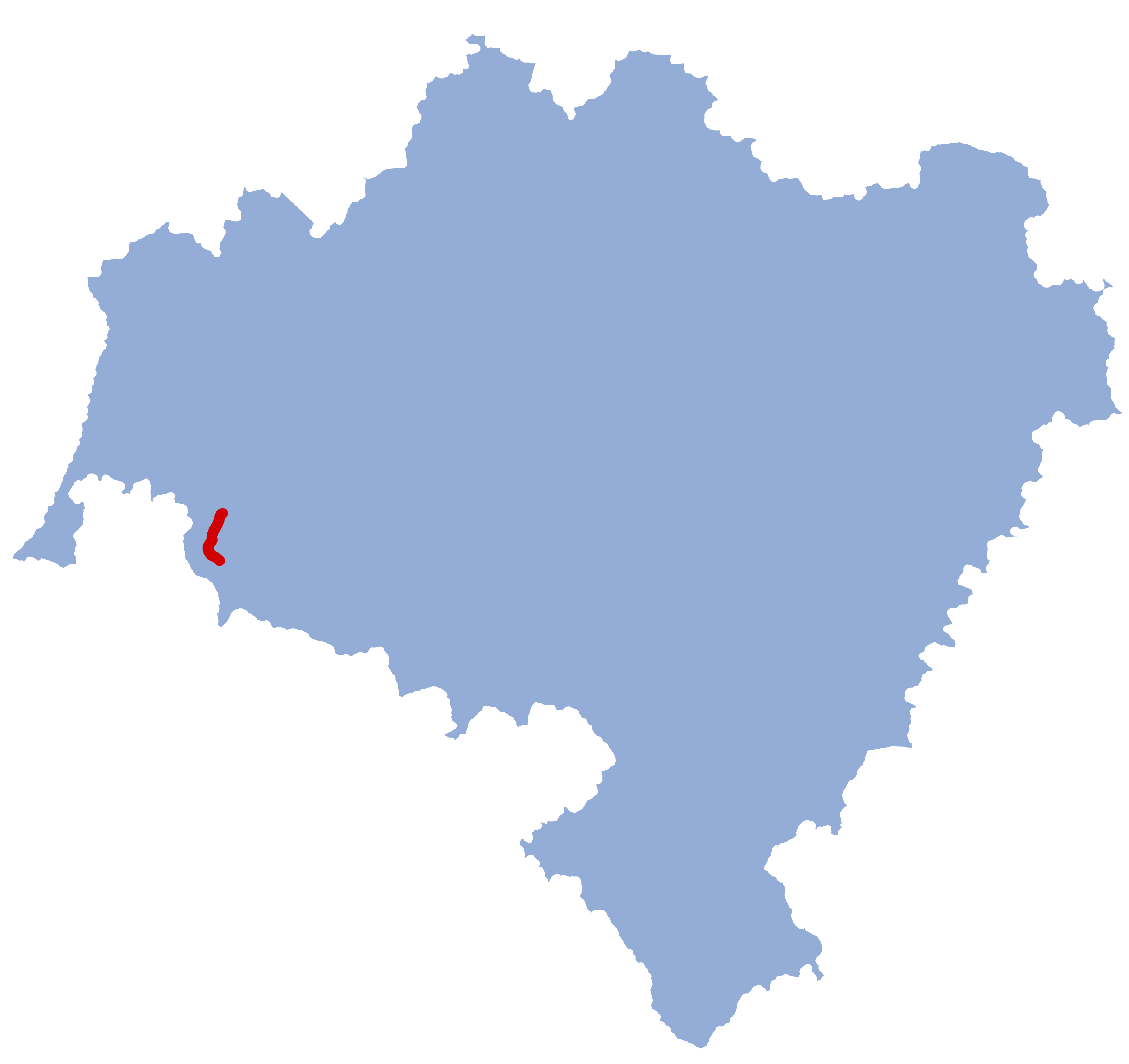

Mirsk–Świeradów Nadleśnictwo railway (before 1945 known as the Isergebirgsbahn or Izera Mountains Railway) was a single-track, non-electrified railway line with a length of 11.011 km, which connected Mirsk railway station with Świeradów Nadleśnictwo railway station. The line was located in the Lower Silesian Voivodeship, within the counties of Lwówek (Gmina Mirsk) and Lubań (town of Świeradów-Zdrój).

The construction of the line was initiated by private interests. The first work began in 1908, and regular operations on the Mirsk–Świeradów-Zdrój section started on 31 October 1909. The section to Świeradów Nadleśnictwo was opened for regular use on 10 June 1910. The newly built route was initially a narrow-gauge railway with a track gauge of 600 mm, which was later converted to standard gauge after a few years. After World War II, the line was taken over by Polish State Railways, and the first train ran on 18 December 1946 after the bridge over the Kwisa river was rebuilt. The section from Świeradów-Zdrój to Świeradów Nadleśnictwo was scheduled for closure on 15 December 1995. The last passenger train departed from Świeradów-Zdrój railway station on 11 February 1996, but freight traffic continued for another two years.

Between 2021 and 2023, the former Izera Mountains Railway, along with the section No. 317 from Gryfów Śląski to Mirsk, was revitalized, and regular passenger services were inaugurated on 10 December 2023. Since then, the entire route from Gryfów Śląski to Mirsk and Świeradów-Zdrój has been designated as Gryfów Śląski–Świeradów-Zdrój railway.

== Route ==
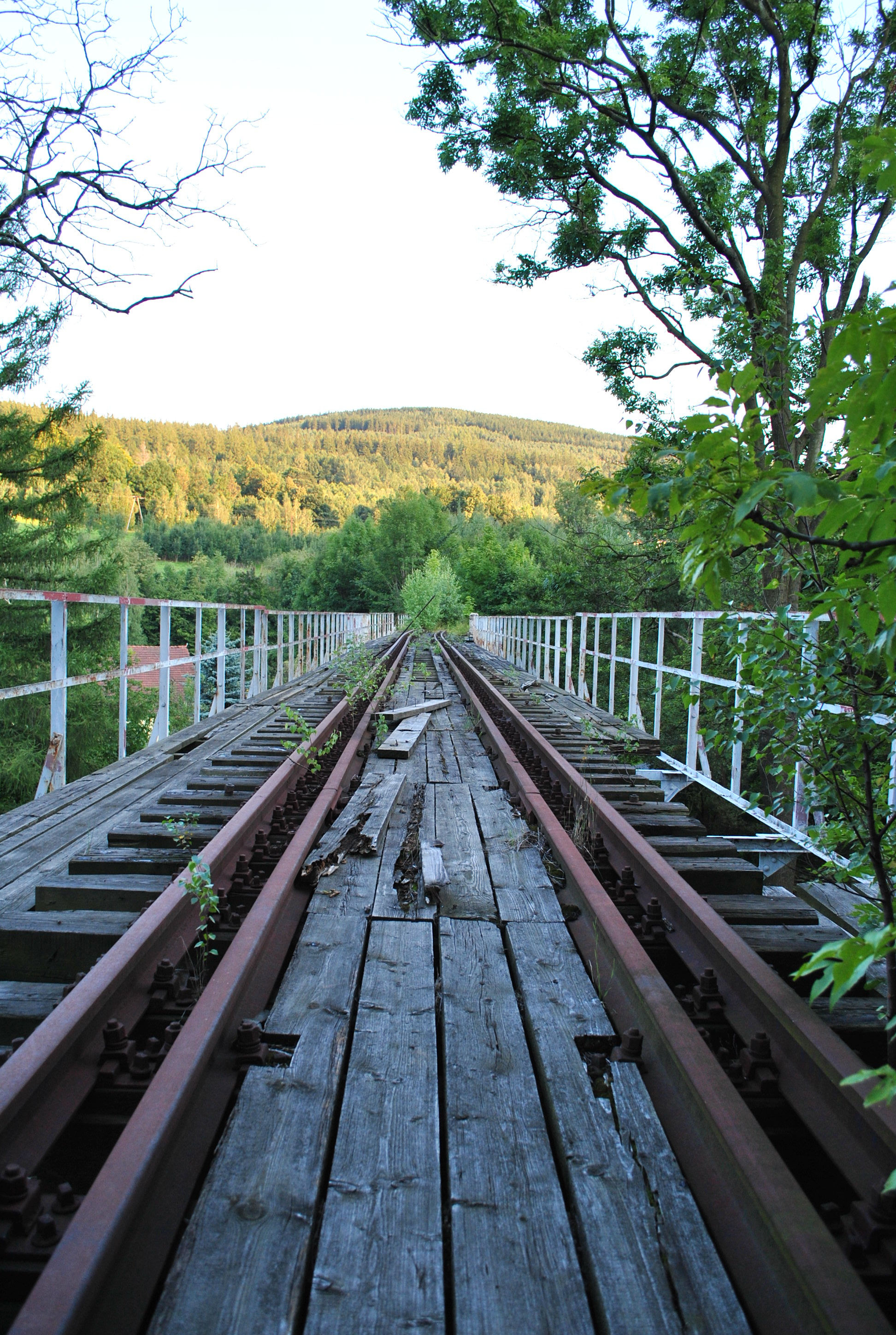
Izera Mountains railway line before entering the bridge over the Kwisa river

Mirsk–Świeradów Nadleśnictwo railway began at Mirsk railway station, where it connected with Legnica–Jerzmanice-Zdrój railway. In 1999, the Mirsk–Gryfów Śląski section was designated as Gryfów Śląski–Świeradów-Zdrój railway. Initially, the lines ran parallel in a southwesterly direction, with Legnica–Jerzmanice-Zdrój railway continuing toward Pobiedna and eventually the Czech border. After a road-rail crossing, the lines diverged, with the Izera Mountains Railway veering left, moving closer to Provincial Road No. 361.

The line continued over flat terrain, passing through agricultural fields in the Mirsk Basin, part of the Izera Foothills. Along the way, it crossed numerous country roads. The line maintained a southerly direction, parallel to the Kwisa river. Approximately 3.5 km from Mirsk station, it reached Mroczkowice railway station, with a 30-meter elevation difference between the two points.

After Mroczkowice, the line slightly diverged from the road, still passing through fields with several intersections with country roads. At approximately 4.7 km, near the junction with a siding to a timber mill, the line entered the Jizera Mountains, specifically the northeastern foothills of Zajęcznik. It then passed through Orłowice, continuing through a small forest before climbing a modest incline to reach Orłowice railway station (5.4 km). This segment saw an elevation gain of 25 meters.

At Orłowice station, there was a junction for a second siding, leading to a mica schist quarry. After the station, the line passed under a road overpass on Provincial Road No. 361, then followed a 400-meter curve, running on an embankment before crossing a railway bridge over the Kwisa river. It then made a 300-meter curve to the right, heading south along the village of Krobica.

The line continued through sparse residential areas, meadows, and small patches of forest, running along the Kwisa river valley at the base of Sępia Góra. After exiting the forest, the line passed under another road bridge and entered Świeradów-Zdrój railway station, having climbed an additional 50 meters from the previous station.

Beyond Świeradów-Zdrój station, the line gradually shifted to a southeast direction, again running through residential areas, meadows, and agricultural fields. It also crossed local roads, mainly those providing access to nearby properties. Finally, the line reached Świeradów Nadleśnictwo railway station, overcoming a further 60-meter elevation difference.

== History ==
=== Origins and initial construction plans ===
The area along the Mirsk–Świeradów Nadleśnictwo railway had a well-developed road network, but maintaining these roads was costly, partly due to the heavy traffic load. This region was also economically developed, with numerous industrial facilities such as water mills, sawmills, brickyards, and weaving mills. The proposed railway at that time could relieve the roads and further support industrial development. Świeradów-Zdrój, located to the south, was a rapidly growing spa town – in 1904, the town attracted 10,581 tourists and spa visitors.

Before the connection to Świeradów-Zdrój was established, a railway line to Mirsk was built. The decision to construct the railway line from Lwówek Śląski to Mirsk via Gryfów Śląski was made in 1882, and the line to Mirsk was officially opened on 1 November 1884.

After the line to Mirsk was completed, plans emerged to extend the route to Świeradów-Zdrój. The first project was initiated in 1897, as part of a narrow-gauge railway system proposed by the Schaffgotsch Chamber Office, aiming to build a 600 mm narrow-gauge line from Mirsk to Świeradów-Zdrój. The primary focus was on passenger transport for spa visitors, with freight transport as a secondary goal. The entire narrow-gauge railway system was intended to connect major towns of economic and tourist significance with the state railway network. However, this project did not receive approval from Liegnitz and was never realized.

The next project emerged in 1901 when the company Allgemeine Deutsche Kleinbahn-Gesellschaft AG from Berlin advocated for the construction of a standard-gauge line between Mirsk and Świeradów-Zdrój. Although the project received approval, it was not implemented for unknown reasons, likely due to a lack of financial resources. Two years later, the company Hutter, Walter & Co. from Hamburg sought to build a standard-gauge line. Despite receiving permission, the company did not proceed beyond preliminary studies.

The previous failures of private companies did not deter other potential investors from pursuing the construction of the line, as evidenced by petitions and requests sent to the Ministry of Public Works. On 23 April 1909, the President of the Province of Silesia issued a statement indicating that the state did not plan to construct new railway lines in the Jizera Mountains region in the near future.

=== Construction of the line ===
The construction of the railway line to Świeradów-Zdrój was finally initiated through private efforts. The company Eisenbahn Gesellschaft Becker & Co. from Berlin submitted a petition on 2 October 1905 to begin preliminary work on a standard-gauge connection between Mirsk and Świeradów-Zdrój. Permission was granted in January 1906, and the first work commenced on February 1 of that year. However, two weeks later, due to harsh winter conditions, the fieldwork was halted. On March 19 of the same year, work on the project resumed, driven by the need to create detailed maps.

By 1907, the project plan for the line was ready. The main objectives of the project included the construction of a sufficiently durable track (12-meter steel rails on pine sleepers) designed to withstand a load of 6 tons per wheel, the erection of four bridges, and in the future, three road bridges over the Kwisa river to accommodate roads leading to the stations. The plan also highlighted the absence of the need for tunnel construction, the shared use of station buildings with the state railway in Mirsk, the construction of stops at Mroczkowice and Krobica with identical facilities, the building of the Świeradów-Zdrój station (with the station building designed to harmonize architecturally with the town's buildings), the construction of the Świeradów Nadleśnictwo station (without the need for a station building there), communication between stations via telephone connections, and the performance of major rolling stock repairs in state-run facilities.

The initial total cost of construction was 1.3 million marks, which increased to 1.45 million marks by 1907. After gathering all necessary data, the County Office in Lwówek Śląski sought to obtain a loan. The decision to grant a loan of 342.5 thousand marks was made on 4 September 1907.

After receiving the first of five loan installments in January 1908, the company Friedeberg-Flinsberger Kleinbahn AG was established on February 1 of the same year. Four days later, on February 5, the president of Liegnitz granted the newly formed company permission to build and operate the railway using steam traction for a period of 90 years (until 1998).

The first fieldwork began in March 1908. Due to challenging construction tasks (such as building the bridge over the Kwisa river and blasting rocks along the Kamienicki Ridge), the first phase of construction was completed on 1 October 1909 (the Mirsk–Świeradów-Zdrój section). The remaining section (to Świeradów Nadleśnictwo) was finished on 29 July 1910. Regular operations on the Mirsk–Świeradów-Zdrój section began on 31 October 1909, while the section to Świeradów Nadleśnictwo was put into regular use on 5 June 1910. The newly constructed line was a narrow-gauge railway with a track gauge of 600 mm.

=== Railway before 1945 ===
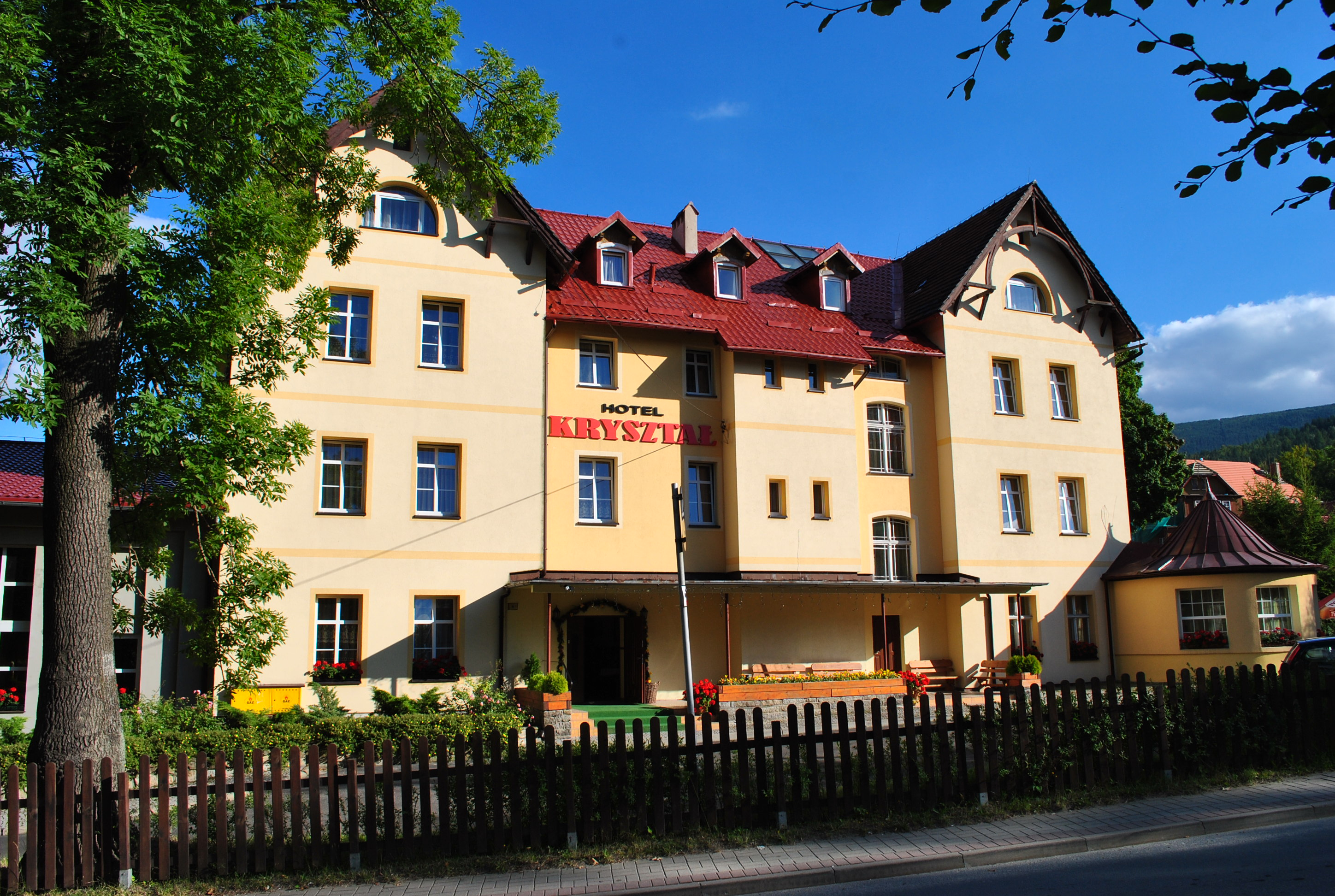
The building of the Kryształ hotel in Świeradów-Zdrój, where part of the rooms were occupied by Isergebirgsbahn AG

After the line was converted to standard gauge (1,435 mm), the company Friedeberg-Flinsberger Kleinbahn AG was renamed Isergebirgsbahn AG (Izera Mountains Railway SA). This company had its headquarters in rooms of the Rübezahl hotel (later known as the Kryształ hotel) in Świeradów-Zdrój.

Starting in 1929, the number of passengers using the Izera Mountains Railway began to decline. The decreasing passenger numbers, along with a reduction in freight traffic, made the railway less profitable. In response, efforts were made to introduce modern rolling stock (motorized railcars), as the lack of such vehicles was seen as a key factor in the drop in passenger numbers. However, these motorized railcars did not fully replace the existing rolling stock due to their high purchase cost. The first of these vehicles was acquired in 1934. That same year, on October 31, a ceremony was held to celebrate the 25th anniversary of the railway's opening, featuring a series of events and special tourist trains.

To save the Izera Mountains Railway, other measures were also taken, including the introduction of direct carriages from Berlin, Dresden, and Wrocław, as well as reducing operational costs (such as introducing mixed passenger and freight trains).

During World War II, traffic on the line decreased. Additionally, there was an accident related to brake failure in the winter of 1941 in Świeradów-Zdrój, when a coal wagon detached from a train and rolled towards Mirsk, where it collided with a passenger train. Although all people had been evacuated from the station beforehand, the wagons were damaged. Towards the end of the war, retreating German forces destroyed one of the supports of the bridge over the Kwisa river.

=== Plans to extend the line to Szklarska Poręba ===
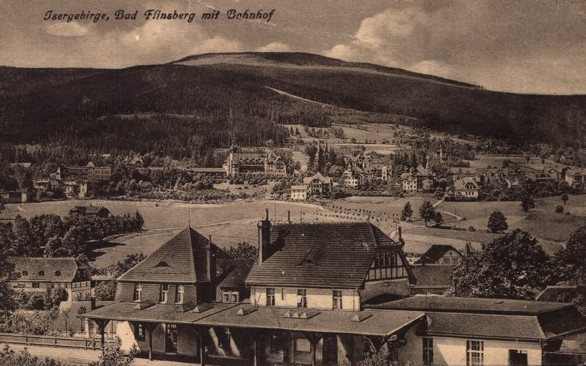
Postcard from between 1940 and 1945 showing a panorama of Świeradów-Zdrój; in the foreground is the Izera Mountains Railway station at Świeradów-Zdrój

Both before and after the opening of the line to Świeradów-Zdrój, there were plans to build or extend the line to Szklarska Poręba. Such a line could have shortened the route between Berlin and Szklarska Poręba by about 30 km. As early as the 1860s, plans existed to construct a line from Gryfów Śląski through Mirsk and Świeradów-Zdrój to Piechowice, but due to a lack of local interest, this idea was never realized.

After the construction of the line to Świeradów-Zdrój, between 1912 and 1913, despite negative opinions from the Ministry of Railways, a project was developed to extend the line to Górzyniec. This new line was planned to be 15 km long, with an estimated construction cost of 3 million marks (more than double the cost of building the Izera Mountains Railway). The project was abandoned during World War I. In 1925, the project was revived, this time aiming to build an electrified line to Szklarska Poręba. However, for economic reasons, this project was also never realized. The idea was revisited during the 25th anniversary celebrations of the railway in 1934, as well as later, in the period leading up to World War II.

It was not only economic factors that hindered the construction of this line. One reason was the fear of losing tourists to the neighboring resort (local authorities in Świeradów-Zdrój were concerned about tourists choosing Szklarska Poręba instead, and vice versa). Legal issues also prevented the construction of the line.

=== Post-War period ===
After World War II, the railway line came under Polish administration, transitioning from a private line to a state-owned one, becoming part of the Polish State Railways network. This formal transfer was made under Article 2 of the law passed on 3 January 1946 regarding the nationalization of key industries. The Isergebirgsbahn AG company was listed in an 26 August 1946 decree, which included the first list of enterprises subject to nationalization.

Polish railway workers took over the station in Świeradów-Zdrój in September 1945. Until the bridge was rebuilt, connections were maintained using horse-drawn vehicles or military trucks. The first train arrived in Świeradów-Zdrój on 18 December 1946 after the bridge was restored, ceremoniously led by the mayor of Mirsk, Ludwik Żak.

The line retained its local character after the war, primarily serving the local population. In the 1950s, the first attempts to close the line were made. In November 1950, the railway connection between Lwówek Śląski and Świeradów-Zdrój was discontinued. The Lwówek Śląski District Council Presidium appealed to the Regional Directorate of State Railways in Wrocław to resume service, which was eventually successful.

Over the years, the line became increasingly unprofitable and underfunded, with its infrastructure deteriorating. By the late 1960s, the platform and several tracks at Krobica station had been dismantled, and the locomotive shed in Mirsk was demolished in the early 1980s. The last significant renovation work began in 1984.

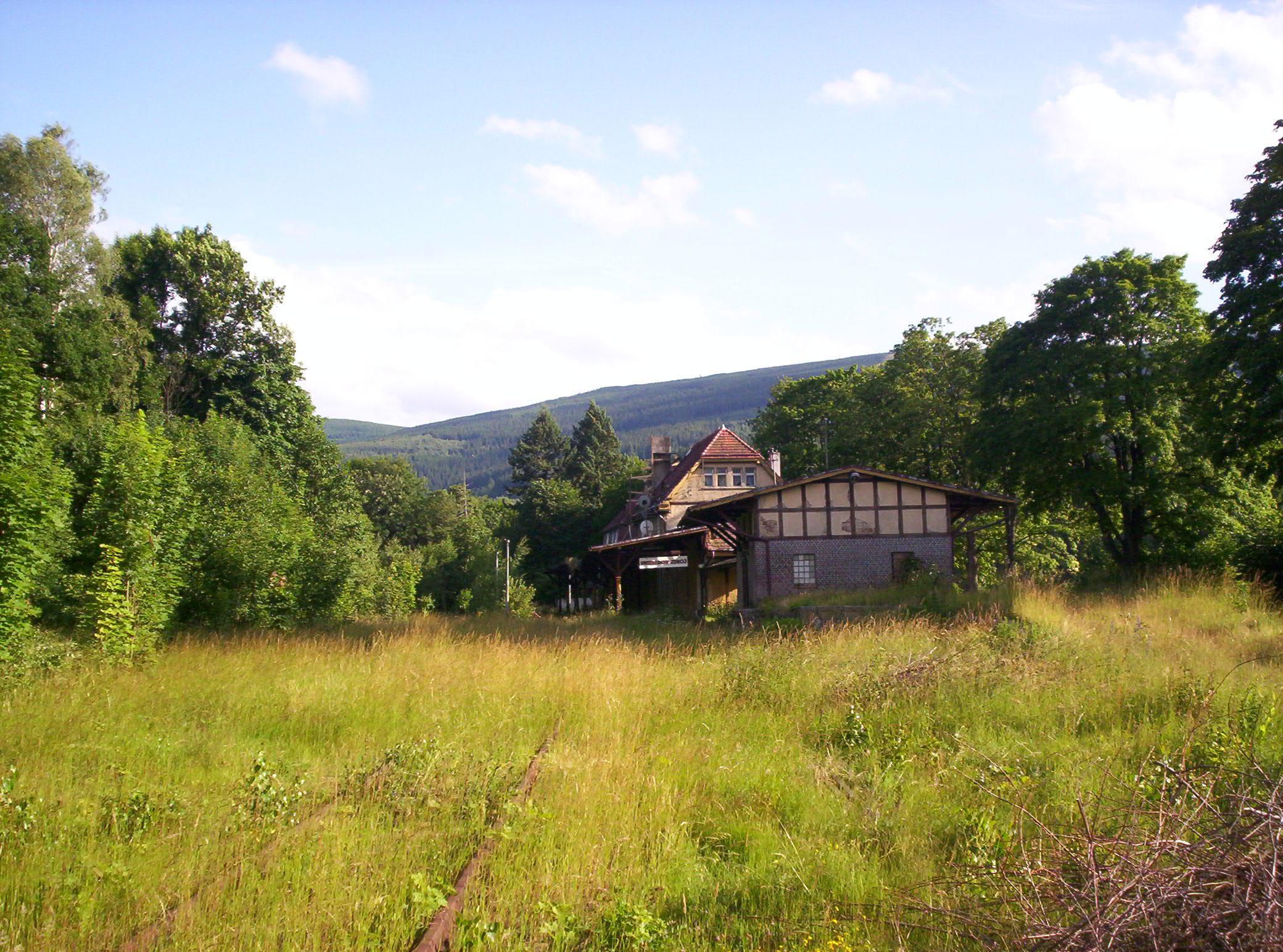
Świeradów-Zdrój railway station in 2008 (view from the north)

On 4 April 1985, at 7:55 PM, a passenger train (no. 77919) from Gryfów Śląski to Świeradów-Zdrój derailed between Krobica and Świeradów-Zdrój stations, causing a 3.5-hour service disruption. The derailment was caused by the SP45 locomotive hitting gravel and stones piled on both sides of the tracks, which were level with the rail head. An investigation revealed that local residents had illegally created a crossing over the tracks.

The decision to suspend passenger service was made on 30 November 1995, and from December 15, that year, the section from Świeradów-Zdrój to Świeradów Nadleśnictwo was earmarked for closure. The last train departed from Świeradów-Zdrój station on 11 February 1996 at 5:00 PM, with bus services replacing the trains. Starting from 1 January 1997, the line was officially closed to passenger, baggage, and express parcel services, and substitute bus service was also discontinued.

For the next two years, freight trains continued to operate. However, train service was completely suspended after a freight train from Świeradów-Zdrój failed to brake in time and collided with a coal wagon at Mirsk station. The rescue train also derailed at the derailer upon entering Mirsk station.

=== Railway line reactivation ===
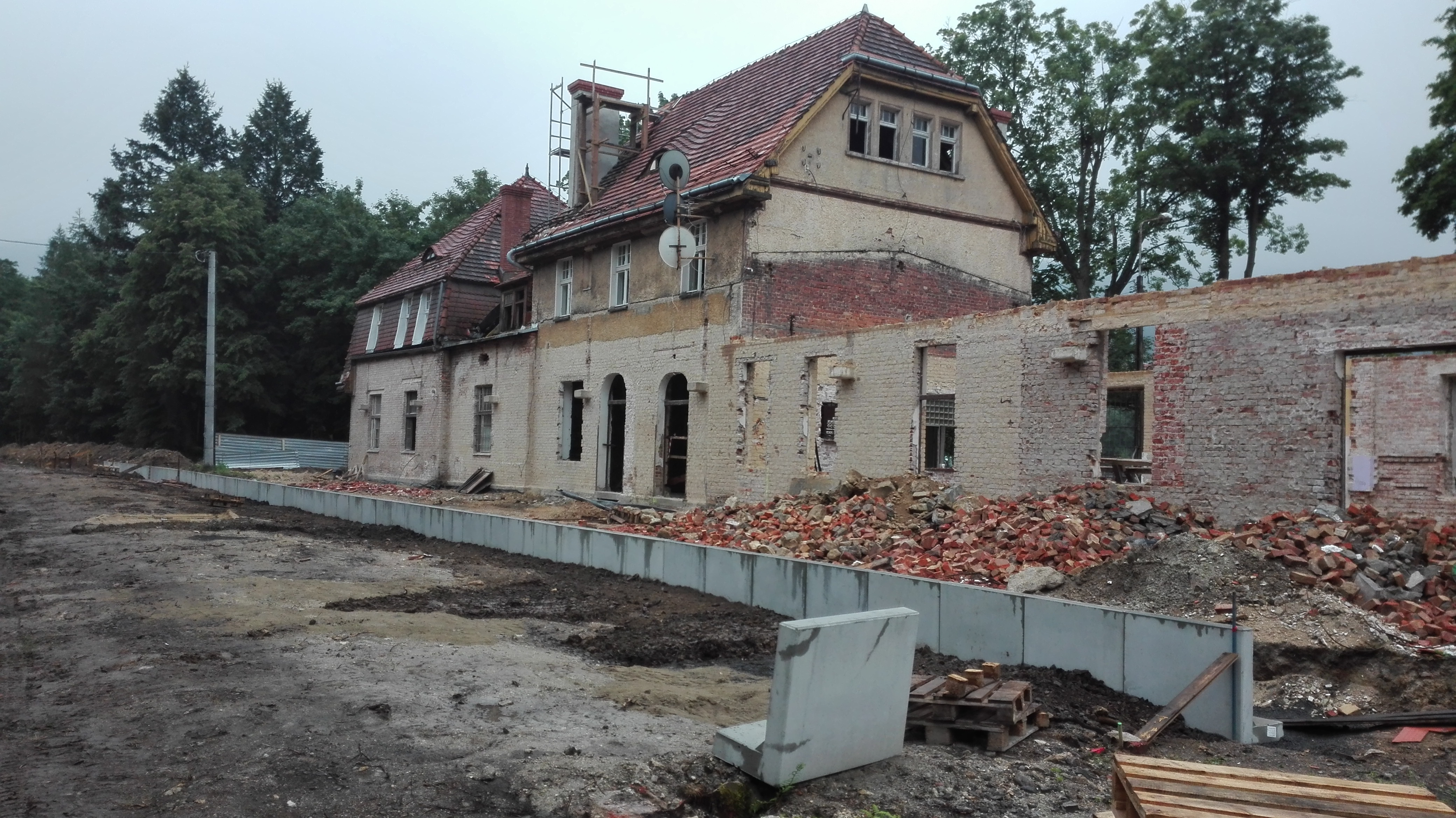
Station at Świeradów-Zdrój stop in the course of renovation

Since the suspension of rail services, several initiatives have emerged to revive the Mirsk–Świeradów Nadleśnictwo railway. Starting in 2008, the process of transferring a portion of the line within the city of Świeradów-Zdrój to the city itself began, which was completed on 27 December 2012. On 1 March 2019, the renovated Świeradów-Zdrój railway station reopened as the Station of Culture – the Municipal Center for Culture, Activity, and Promotion.

On 25 July 2013, Świeradów-Zdrój's mayor, Roland Marciniak, organized a meeting with local officials, including the mayor of Jindřichovice pod Smrkem and the mayors of Mirsk and Leśna, to discuss the Izera Mountains Railway project. This project proposed the reconstruction of the line to Świeradów-Zdrój and the restoration of the discontinued Legnica–Jerzmanice-Zdrój railway from Gryfów Śląski to Jindřichovice pod Smrkem. A partnership agreement was signed to support the restoration of the railway.

On 8 June 2020, a notarial deed was signed, transferring ownership of Mirsk–Świeradów Nadleśnictwo railway from the Polish State Railways to the Lower Silesian Voivodeship. By the end of May 2021, initial work began on revitalizing railway lines 317 (Gryfów Śląski–Mirsk) and 336 (Mirsk–Świeradów-Zdrój).

On 7 December 2023, a ceremony was held to reopen the railway line to Świeradów-Zdrój, and regular passenger services resumed three days later. This marked the return of passenger rail connections to Świeradów-Zdrój and Mirsk after 27 years. According to the PKP Polskie Linie Kolejowe's network timetable for 2023/2024, the entire line from Gryfów Śląski to Świeradów-Zdrój was designated as Gryfów Śląski–Świeradów-Zdrój railway.

== Infrastructure ==
As of 1996, the Mirsk–Świeradów Nadleśnictwo railway spanned a total length of 11.011 kilometers. The line was entirely single-tracked and non-electrified, although at that time, multiple tracks were present at all stations along the route. The elevation difference between Mirsk station and Świeradów Nadleśnictwo station was 177 meters, with an average gradient of 18‰.

The track bed was 4.2 meters wide. The tracks themselves were composed of 12-meter-long rails laid on 2.5-meter-long impregnated pine sleepers, with some sections also featuring metal sleepers. The curves of the track varied from 300 to 800 meters in radius. The track was laid on a basalt ballast bed, designed to withstand an axle load of up to 12 tons.

=== Traffic control posts ===
The Mirsk–Świeradów Nadleśnictwo railway originally featured a total of five stations and stops. The Mirsk station was initially a junction station. Over time, however, several of these facilities were downgraded – Mirsk and Świeradów-Zdrój stations were reduced to freight depots, and the Krobica station was downgraded to a passenger stop.

List of traffic control posts on Mirsk–Świeradów Nadleśnictwo railway (as of 1996)
Name	Track kilometer	Altitude (meters above sea level)	Original type	Number of platform edges	Infrastructure	Picture
Mirsk	–0.182	355	station	3	Railway station with warehouse and signal box; Execution signal box; Toilet; Water tower; 2 loading areas	
Mroczkowice	3.328	385	passenger stop	1	none	
Krobica	5.260	410	station	1	Railway station with warehouse; Toilet; Loading area; Lateral-end ramp	
Świeradów-Zdrój	7.701	460	station	3	Railway station with signal box; Warehouse with lateral-end ramp; Toilet; Loading area	
Świeradów Nadleśnictwo	10.829	520	freight station	0 (formerly 2)	Loading area	

=== Bridges and viaducts ===
Due to the varied terrain and the presence of numerous obstacles, such as the Kwisa river valley and streams, it was necessary to construct several crossings, both road and railway, as well as numerous culverts for mountain streams. All of these were built after the Krobica station, where the line takes on a mountainous character. The longest of these crossings is over 60 meters long and runs under the Kwisa river valley. In total, there were 2 railway bridges, 2 road viaducts, and over 15 culverts on the line.

List of bridges and viaducts on Mirsk–Świeradów Nadleśnictwo railway (as of 1996)
Type	Nearest station	Years of construction	Kilometers	Length (meters)	Number of spans	Characteristics	Picture
Road viaduct	Krobica	1908–1909	5.300	40	3	Viaduct just past the Krobica station heading towards Świeradów-Zdrój station; this viaduct is part of the Provincial Road No. 361	
Railway bridge	Krobica	1909	5.650	65	5	The longest bridge on the entire route, crossing three obstacles: Provincial Road No. 358, the Kwisa river, and a local road in Krobica; consists of 3 steel spans of 18 m each and 2 arched spans of 5 m each; the extreme spans rest on two sandstone-clad pillars; the central span is made of a simple riveted truss, and the two adjacent spans are I-beams	
Road viaduct	Świeradów-Zdrój	?	?	15	?	Small viaduct of a local road (Wiejska Street in Świeradów-Zdrój)	
Railway bridge	Świeradów Nadleśnictwo	?	?	15	?	Small railway crossing over the Bystrzyk stream	

=== Other infrastructure ===
Mirsk–Świeradów Nadleśnictwo railway was characterized by a considerable number of railway-road crossings, and in places where the line intersected with larger roads, it ran at different levels: either under the road (such as the road viaduct near the Krobica station) or over it (such as the bridge over the Kwisa river and Provincial Road No. 358). One of the largest railway-road crossings was located just past the Mirsk station, at the intersection with the county road between Mirsk and Giebułtów (Mickiewicz Street in Mirsk). Another crossing was located past the Świeradów-Zdrój station (crossing over Stawowa Street). The remaining crossings were mainly intersections with field roads and access roads, particularly numerous on the sections between Mirsk–Krobica and Świeradów-Zdrój–Świeradów Nadleśnictwo.

== Operation ==
=== Passenger transport ===
Passenger transport on the Mirsk–Świeradów-Zdrój route (1910–1939)
Period	Number of passengers
1910	121,966
1913–1914	121,755
1914–1918	≈80,000
1927	122,000
1928	167,000
1933	88,000
1935	144,156
1939	149,527

The Mirsk–Świeradów Nadleśnictwo railway primarily served local passenger traffic, transporting mostly local residents as well as spa guests and tourists. Over time, passenger numbers on the line fluctuated significantly. In the initial period of operation (until World War I), the number of passengers was relatively stable, averaging around 120,000 per year. During World War I, passenger numbers decreased by over 30%, dropping to below 80,000 per year. In the following years, passenger traffic increased, reaching its peak in 1928 with 167,000 passengers. After that, passenger numbers declined again. Overall, between 1909 and 1934, the line transported approximately 2.71 million passengers. Passenger numbers declined again during World War II.

After World War II, the passenger numbers never reached the pre-war levels, and gradually decreased in favor of road and bus transport.

==== Passenger connections ====
Mirsk–Świeradów Nadleśnictwo railway had a local character, which meant that long-distance trains did not typically run on this line. However, before 1945, special trains (including holiday trains) occasionally ran on this route, bringing tourists and spa guests to Świeradów-Zdrój. Additionally, long-distance carriages from Berlin, Wrocław, and Dresden also traveled on this line.

In local traffic, from the beginning of the line's operation until 1945, trains operated by the later company Isergebirgsbahn AG ran on the route from Mirsk to Świeradów-Zdrój to Świeradów Nadleśnictwo. Passengers transferred to state-operated trains at the Mirsk station, and most of these were scheduled to connect with the Mirsk–Świeradów Nadleśnictwo railway trains.

Scheduled travel times of passenger trains
Period	Segment									Source
Period	Mirsk–Świeradów-Zdrój (12.9 km)			Świeradów-Zdrój–Świeradów Nadleśnictwo (3.1 km)			Average commercial speed (km/h)			Source
Period	min.	avg.	max.	min.	avg.	max.	max.	avg.	min.	Source
1914	0:20	0:22	0:23	0:09	0:09	0:10	38.7	35.1	33.7	
1939	0:15	0:15	0:16	0:05	0:06	0:06	51.6	51.6	48.4	
1947	0:28	0:32	0:47	0:10	0:14	0:30	27.6	24.2	16.5	
1966/1967	0:18	0:20	0:21	–	–	–	43.0	38.7	36.9	
1975/1976	0:18	0:20	0:21	–	–	–	43.0	38.7	36.9	
1988/1989	0:27	0:28	0:28	–	–	–	28.7	27.6	27.6	
1995/1996	0:19	0:19	0:19	–	–	–	40.7	40.7	40.7	

For a long time after the line's opening, direct carriages did not run, mainly because the idea was blocked by the State Railways Management for nearly 30 years. It wasn't until 1934, when the neighboring Karkonosze Railway (later Mysłakowice–Karpacz railway) obtained permission to introduce direct carriages on the Berlin/Wrocław–Karpacz route, that the Mirsk–Świeradów Nadleśnictwo railway soon received similar permission. This allowed the introduction of direct carriages on the Wrocław Świebodzki–Zgorzelec railway trains to Świeradów-Zdrój. Carriages ran to Berlin (via Zgorzelec), Dresden, and Wrocław (via Jelenia Góra). There were also a significant number of local connections. In the interwar period, there were 7 pairs of trains on the Mirsk–Świeradów-Zdrój section, and in 1939, there were 10 pairs (including 3 to Świeradów Nadleśnictwo station).

After the line was taken over by the Polish State Railways, local train connections were extended, but their frequency decreased (on average, 4 pairs of trains). Trains no longer terminated at the former Mirsk station (which significantly reduced its function as a junction station), but ran to Legnica via Mirsk, Gryfów Śląski, Lwówek Śląski, Jerzmanice-Zdrój, and Złotoryja, i.e., along almost the entire Legnica–Jerzmanice-Zdrój railway, as well as to Jelenia Góra, but via Lwówek Śląski. With the suspension of passenger train service on the Lwówek Śląski–Gryfów Śląski section in 1984/1985, passenger trains ended their route at Gryfów Śląski station, and some trains that used to run to Jelenia Góra via Lwówek Śląski from then on ran via Stara Kamienica (along Legnica–Jerzmanice-Zdrój railway). At various times, other connections also appeared: according to the timetable for 1988/1989, there was a connection to Zgorzelec and Lubań, but no longer to Jelenia Góra. In the 1994/1995 period, a train ran to Lubań, and in the 1995/1996 period, two connections were to Lubań. Additionally, some of these trains were connected in Gryfów Śląski with trains to Jelenia Góra.

Number of passenger train pairs per day
Segment	1914	1939	1947	1966/1967	1975/1976	1988/1989	1995/1996
Mirsk–Świeradów-Zdrój	6	10	3	5	5	4	3/2
Świeradów-Zdrój–Świeradów Nadleśnictwo	4	3	3	–	–	–	–

=== Freight traffic ===
In the period before World War II, freight transport fluctuated less than passenger transport. In 1911, 27,000 tons of goods were transported. In the period from 1909 to 1934, approximately 565,000 tons of cargo were transported, averaging 25,000 to 28,000 tons per year. In 1935 and 1938, about 21,000 tons of goods were transported. At that time, timber from the forest and coal were mainly transported along the line.

Freight transport was supported by two sidings: one to a wood processing plant and one to a mica schist mine (Orłowice), as well as warehouses, loading ramps, and storage areas at the Mirsk, Krobica, and Świeradów-Zdrój stations, as well as the Świeradów Nadleśnictwo station, which was used for timber transshipment.

=== Rolling stock operation ===
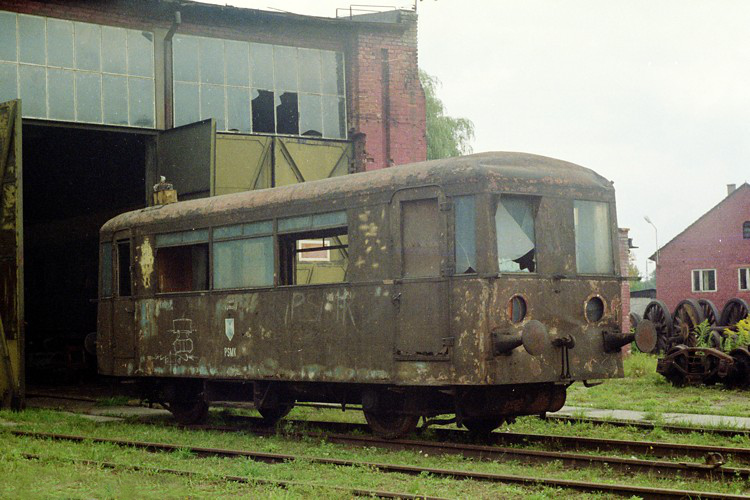
Motor coach VT-10 operated on the Mirsk–Świeradów Nadleśnictwo railway from 1934 to 1938, stationed at the Roundhouse Skierniewice

In the first year of operation, the line was serviced by:

- 5 T3³ locomotives
- 1 postal wagon
- 6 freight wagons (including a wagon for transporting lighting gas)
- 4 third-class passenger cars

Over time, older locomotives were replaced with newer or used ones. Efforts were also made to introduce motor coaches, as they were more attractive from the passengers' perspective. The first of these, the VT-10, was purchased in 1934. Its inaugural run took place on October 2 of that year, coinciding with the 25th anniversary of the line's opening. However, it ultimately proved too small, so two larger coaches – VT-11 – were purchased later.

In 1935, the Isergebirgsbahn AG company operated the line with the following rolling stock:

- 4 locomotives
- 1 motor coach
- 1 postal wagon
- 4 passenger cars
- 6 freight wagons

Rolling stock operated on the line by Isergebirgsbahn AG from 1909 to 1945
Prussian name	Polish name/Equivalent	Quantity	Manufacturer	Start of operation	End of operation	Notes
Locomotives (1909–1945)
T3³	TKh1	5	Vulkan	1909	1929 (2 locomotives)	The first tank locomotives operated on this line; they were chosen due to the significant elevation differences on the line and relatively short distances between stations.
T3^{4}	TKh1	1 1	Hohenzollern Henschel & Son	1929 1930	?	
T26 (T9²)	TKi2	2	Union	1930	1934	Previously, these locomotives served a rack railway in Thuringia; after rebuilding, they were reclassified as T9².
T9³	TKi3	?	?	1934	?	
BR86	TKt3	?	Henschel & Son	?	?	
Motor cars (1909–1945)
VT-10	SN51	1	Waggonbau Görlitz	1934	1938	Operated routes with low passenger numbers; 31 seats; after the Mirsk–Świeradów Nadleśnictwo railway purchased the VT-11, the VT-10 was transferred to the Zgorzelec Railway, as it proved too small.
VT-11	–	2	Waggonbau Görlitz	1938 (?)	1945	70 seats; after World War II, they were likely taken to the Soviet Union.

After the war, the VT-11 motor coaches were likely taken to the Soviet Union, while the VT-10 coach, which survived World War II near Zgorzelec, was brought to the Roundhouse Skierniewice depot in 1990. After the line was taken over by the Polish State Railways following World War II, initially, post-war operations resumed in November 1946 using German rolling stock. Polish steam locomotives adapted to mountain lines – TKt48 and TKt2 (the latter operated the line until the mid-1960s) – were also introduced on the route. In later years, diesel locomotives such as SM42, SU42, and SU45 were used, pulling various wagons, including those phased out from main routes by the 1980s. In the final years of operation, the SP42 and SP45 locomotives also ran on the route, pulling 1 or 2 second-class carriages, including both compartment cars and 120A-type wagons.

== Bibliography ==
- Bossowski, J. A. (2004). Kolej do Świeradowa Zdroju (in Polish). Lwówek Śląski: Bud-Stal-Test II. ISBN 83-919960-2-6.
- Gołaszewski, J. (1997). "Kolejka Izerska 1909–1945". Rocznik Jeleniogórski (in Polish). Jelenia Góra: Towarzystwo Przyjaciół Jeleniej Góry. ISSN 0080-3480.
