= Kotlina =

Kotlina may refer to:

the following places in Poland:

- Kotlina in Gmina Mirsk, Lwówek County in Lower Silesian Voivodeship (SW Poland)
- Other places called Kotlina (listed in Polish Wikipedia)

place in Croatia:

- Kotlina, settlement in Croatian Baranja
