= Mlądz =

Mlądz may refer to the following places in Poland:

- Mlądz, Lwówek County in Gmina Mirsk, Lwówek County, Lower Silesian Voivodeship (SW Poland)
- Other places called Mlądz (listed in Polish Wikipedia)
