= Brzeziniec =

Brzeziniec may refer to the following places in Poland:

- Brzeziniec, Lower Silesian Voivodeship (south-west Poland)
- Brzeziniec, Pomeranian Voivodeship (north Poland)
