= Querbach =

Querbach may refer to:

- Querbach (Westerbach), a river of Bavaria, Germany, headwater of the Westerbach
- Przecznica, German name Querbach, a village in the administrative district of Gmina Mirsk, Lower Silesian Voivodeship, Poland
