= Henryk Maculewicz =

Polish footballer

Personal information
- Full name: Henryk Józef Maculewicz
- Date of birth: 24 April 1950 (age 76)
- Place of birth: Grudza, Poland
- Height: 1.80 m (5 ft 11 in)
- Position: Defender

Senior career*
Years	Team	Apps	(Gls)
1970–1971	BKS Bolesławiec		
1970–1971	Garbarnia Kraków		
1971–1979	Wisła Kraków	193	(11)
1979–1981	RC Lens	51	(1)
1981–1984	Paris FC		
1984–1987	Nanterre		

International career
1974–1978	Poland	23	(0)

Managerial career
- CSB Batevall
- * Club domestic league appearances and goals

Henryk Józef Maculewicz (born 24 April 1950) is a Polish former professional footballer who played as a defender.

During his club career, he played for Wisła Kraków and RC Lens. He earned 23 caps for the Poland national team, and participated in the 1978 FIFA World Cup.

== Honours ==
Wisła Kraków

- Ekstraklasa: 1977–78
