= Proszowa =

- Village
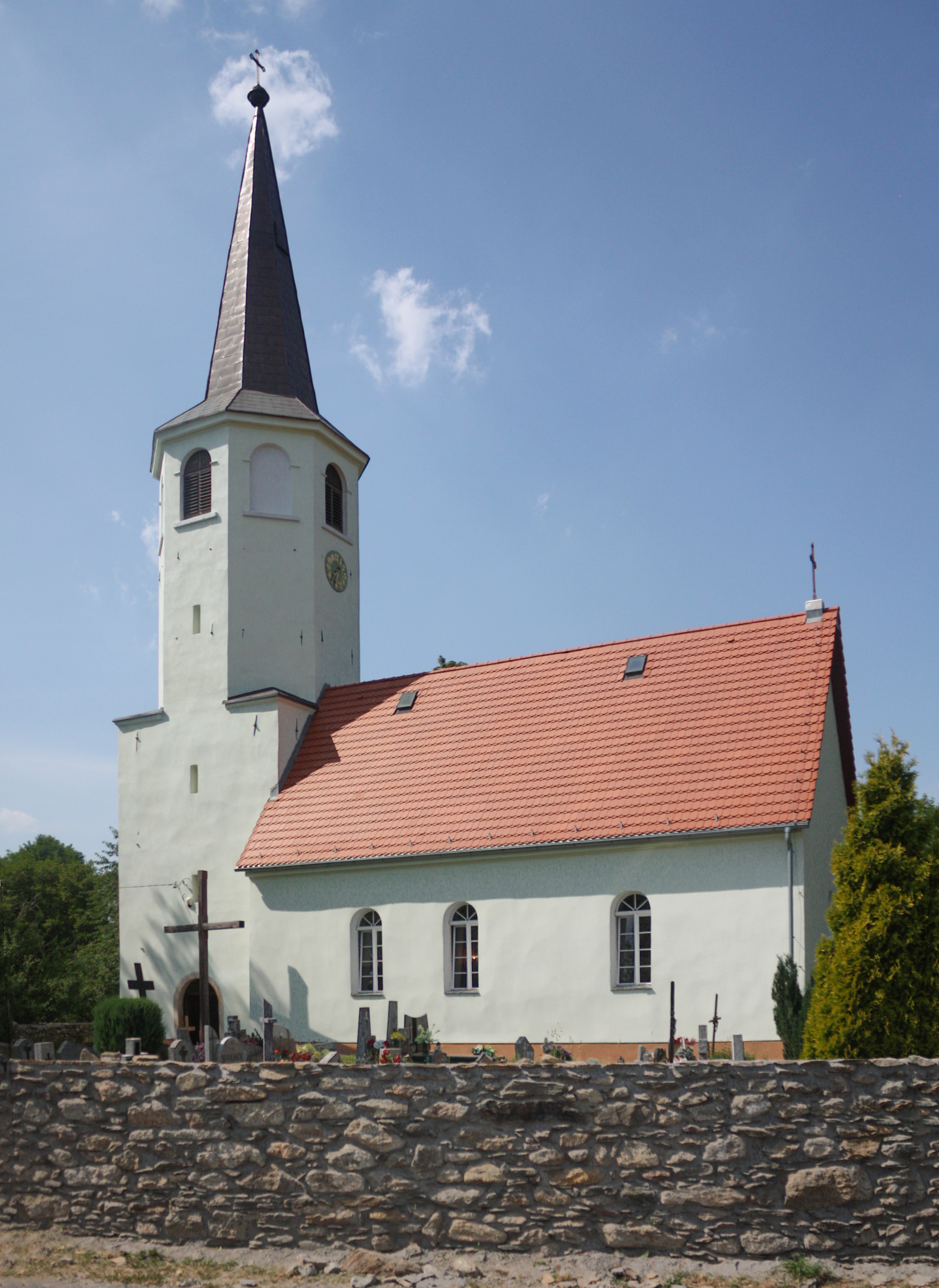
- Church of Saint John the Baptist

- Location within Poland
- Coordinates: 50°56′N 15°29′E
- Country: Poland
- Voivodeship: Lower Silesian
- County: Lwówek
- Gmina: Mirsk
- Highest elevation: 510 m (1,670 ft)
- Lowest elevation: 455 m (1,493 ft)

Population
  - Total: 139
- Time zone: UTC+1 (CET)
  - Summer (DST): UTC+2 (CEST)
- Vehicle registration: DLW

Proszowa [prɔˈʂɔva] is a village in the administrative district of Gmina Mirsk, within Lwówek County, Lower Silesian Voivodeship, in south-western Poland, close to the Czech border.
