= Gierczyn =

- Village
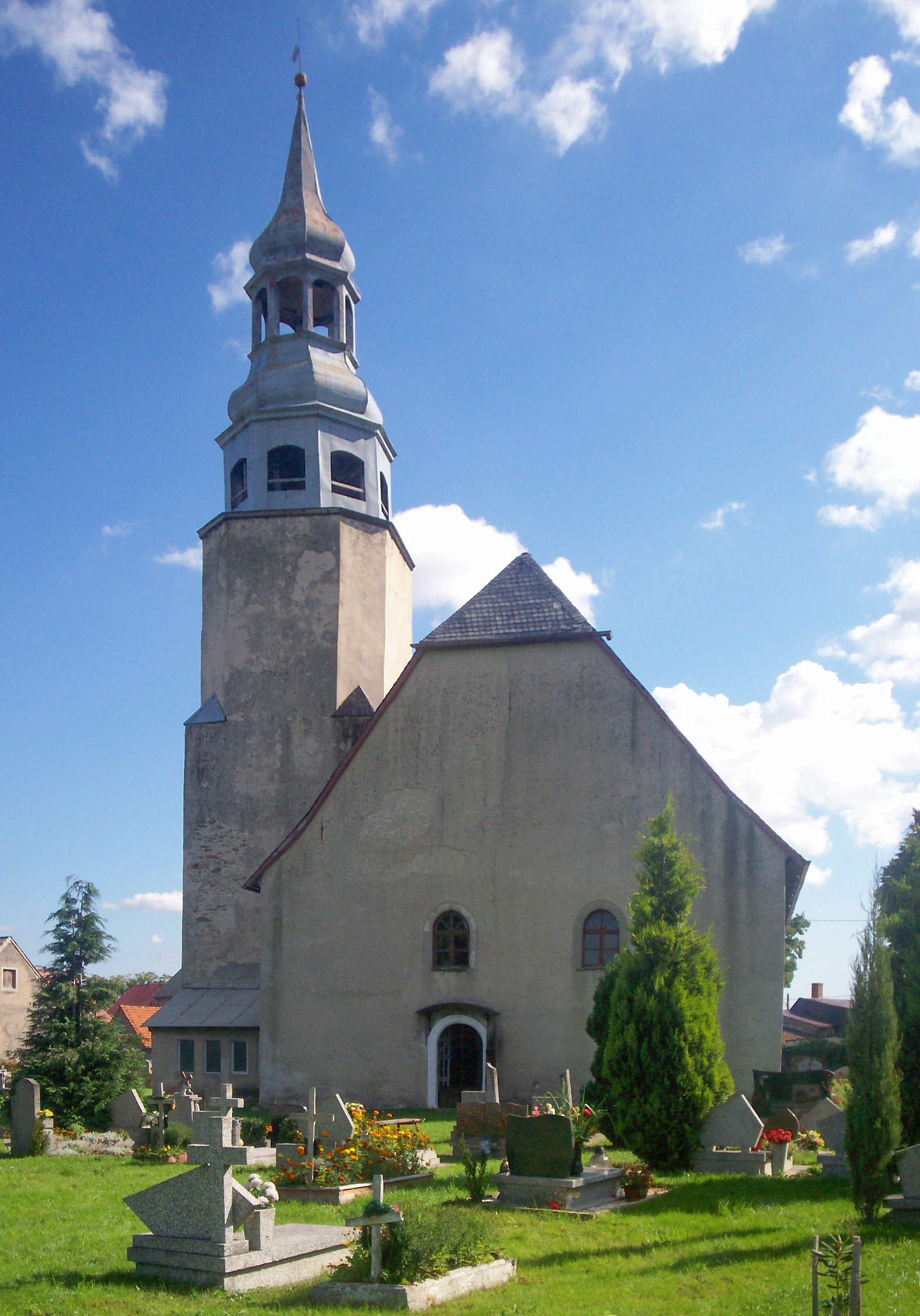
- Church of the Nativity of the Virgin Mary

- Location within Poland
- Coordinates: 50°55′N 15°24′E
- Country: Poland
- Voivodeship: Lower Silesian
- County: Lwówek
- Gmina: Mirsk
- Highest elevation: 600 m (2,000 ft)
- Lowest elevation: 420 m (1,380 ft)

Population
  - Total: 300
- Time zone: UTC+1 (CET)
  - Summer (DST): UTC+2 (CEST)
- Vehicle registration: DLW

Gierczyn [ˈɡʲɛrt͡ʂɨn] is a village in the administrative district of Gmina Mirsk, within Lwówek County, Lower Silesian Voivodeship, in south-western Poland, close to the Czech border.

A trade route connecting Jelenia Góra with Frýdlant and Zittau passed through the village in the late medieval and early modern periods.

== Notable people ==
- Andrzej Biegalski, Polish boxer

== Bibliography ==
- Birecki T., 1959, "Złoże cyny w Przecznicy (Dolny Śląsk)." [Lode Of Tin Ore In Przecznica (Lower Silesia)]; in: Zeszyty Naukowe AGH, No. 22, Geologia vol.3, pp. 35–53, Kraków (in Polish)
