= Gajówka, Lower Silesian Voivodeship =

Gajówka
- Village
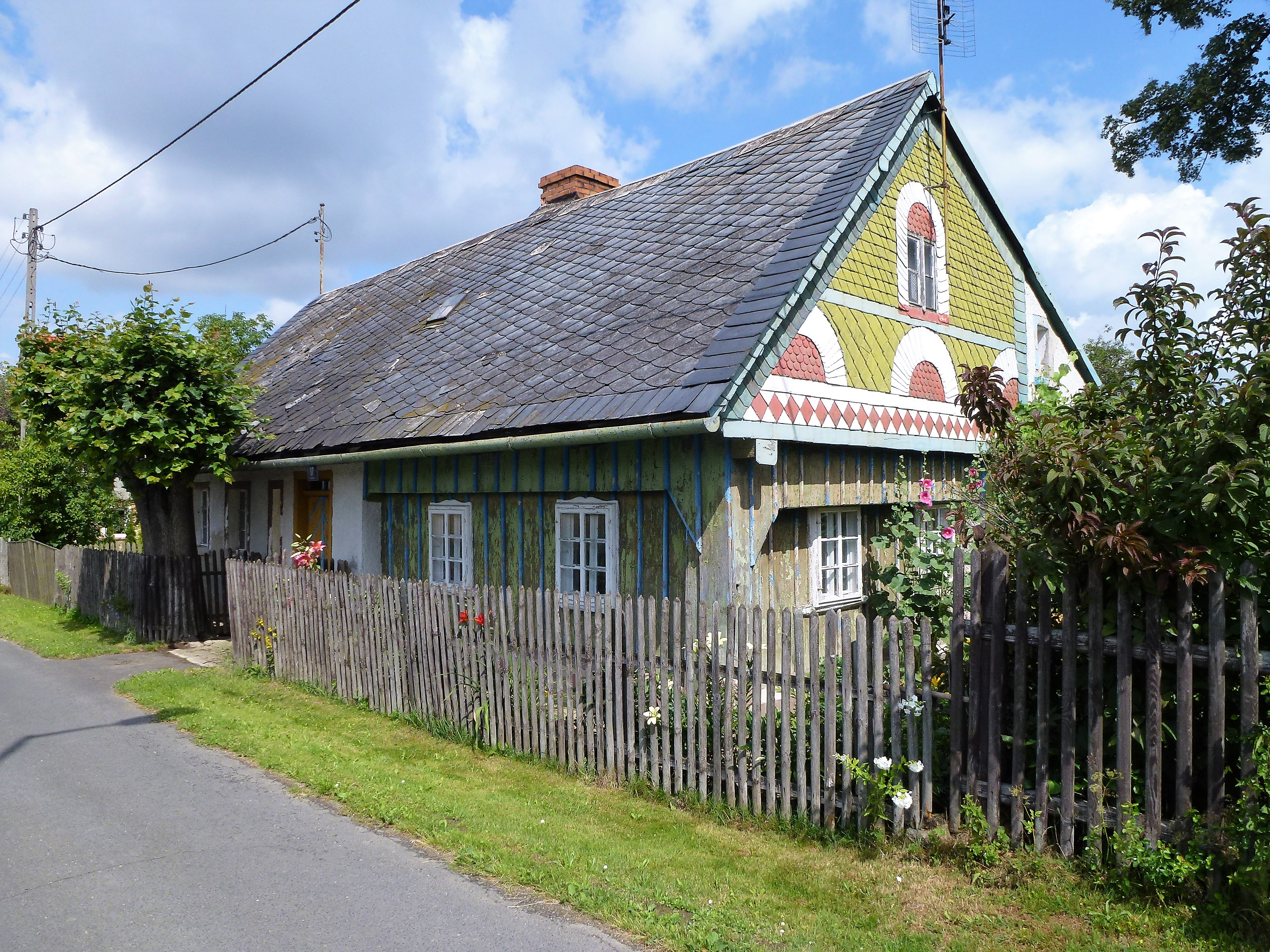

- Location within Poland
- Coordinates: 50°58′13″N 15°27′28″E
- Country: Poland
- Voivodeship: Lower Silesian
- County: Lwówek
- Gmina: Mirsk

Gajówka [ɡaˈjufka] is a village in the administrative district of Gmina Mirsk, within Lwówek County, Lower Silesian Voivodeship, in south-western Poland, close to the Czech border.
