= Kamień, Lwówek County =

Kamień
- Village
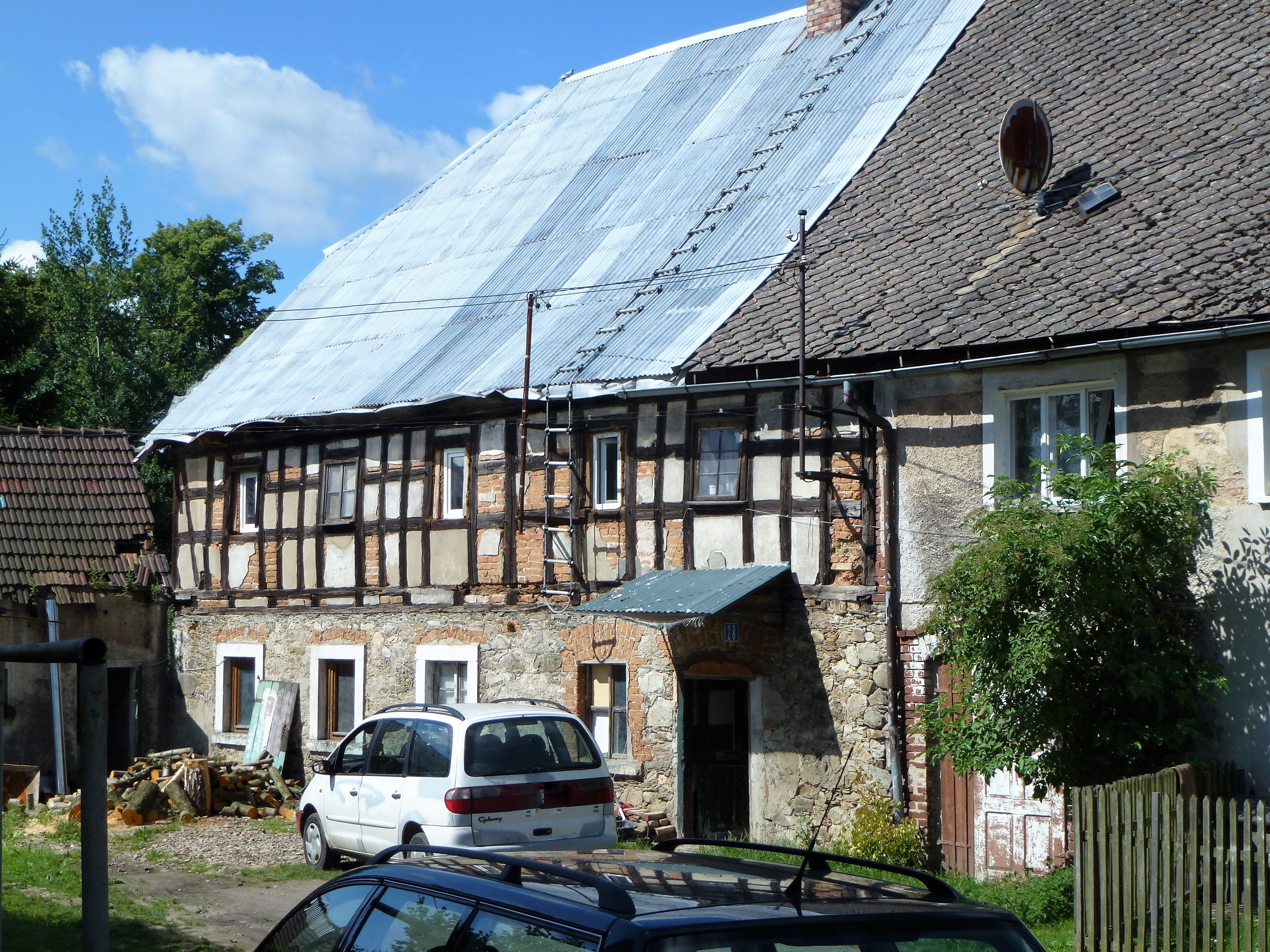

- Location within Poland
- Coordinates: 50°57′10″N 15°22′17″E
- Country: Poland
- Voivodeship: Lower Silesian
- County: Lwówek
- Gmina: Mirsk

Kamień (Polish pronunciation: [ˈkamjɛj̃]) is a village in the administrative district of Gmina Mirsk, within Lwówek County, Lower Silesian Voivodeship, in south-western Poland, close to the Czech border.
