= Andrzej Biegalski =

Polish boxer

- Born: 5 March 1953; Gierczyn, Poland
- Died: 14 March 2017 (aged 64); Jastrzębie-Zdrój, Poland

Andrzej Biegalski (5 March 1953 – 14 March 2017) was a Polish heavyweight amateur boxing champion. He reached the quarterfinal round in the World Championships in Havana, 1974.

Biegalski's greatest success came with gold in European Championship in Katowice, Poland, June 1975 when he beat Peter Hussing from Germany by a heavy KO. However, he was not able to follow that success with more achievement due to overexploitation. During 1976 Summer Olympics, he lost his first bout to John Tate. He also participated in the European Championship in 1979.

Biegalski was a three time national champion in 1974 and in 1978 in a heavyweight division, and in 1979 in a superheavyweight competition.

Later in life he was also involved in politics.

== 1976 Olympic results ==
Below is the record of Andrzej Biegalski, a Polish heavyweight boxer who competed at the 1976 Montreal Olympics:

- Round of 32: bye
- Round of 16: lost to John Tate (United States) by decision, 0-5
