= Kwieciszowice =

- Village
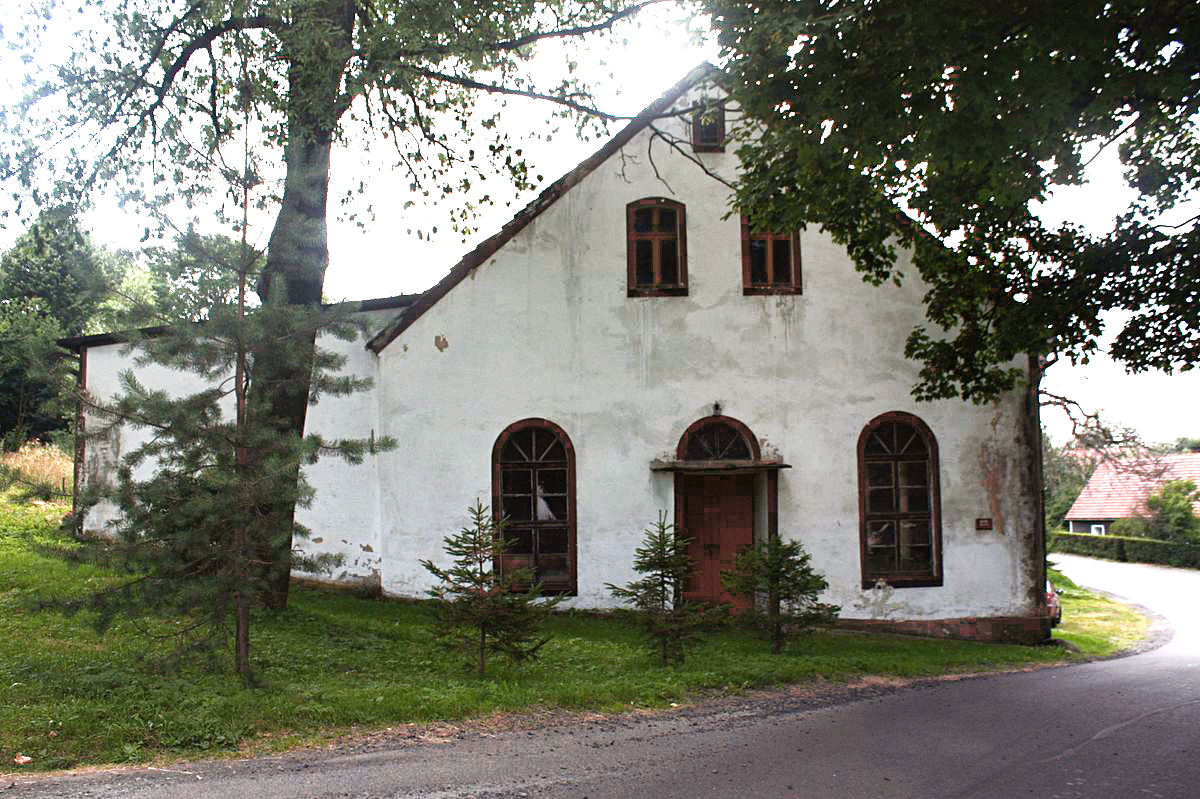
- Church in Kwieciszowice

- Location within Poland
- Coordinates: 50°55′10.56″N 15°29′49.24″E
- Country: Poland
- Voivodeship: Lower Silesian
- County: Lwówek
- Gmina: Mirsk
- Highest elevation: 480 m (1,570 ft)
- Lowest elevation: 435 m (1,427 ft)

Population
  - Total: 135
- Time zone: UTC+1 (CET)
  - Summer (DST): UTC+2 (CEST)
- Vehicle registration: DLW

Kwieciszowice [kfjɛt͡ɕiʂɔˈvit͡sɛ] is a village in the administrative district of Gmina Mirsk, within Lwówek County, Lower Silesian Voivodeship, in south-western Poland, close to the Czech border.

The village is located in the Jizera Mountains.

A trade route connecting Jelenia Góra with Frýdlant and Zittau passed through the village in the late medieval and early modern periods.
