= Giebułtów, Lower Silesian Voivodeship =

Giebułtów
- Village
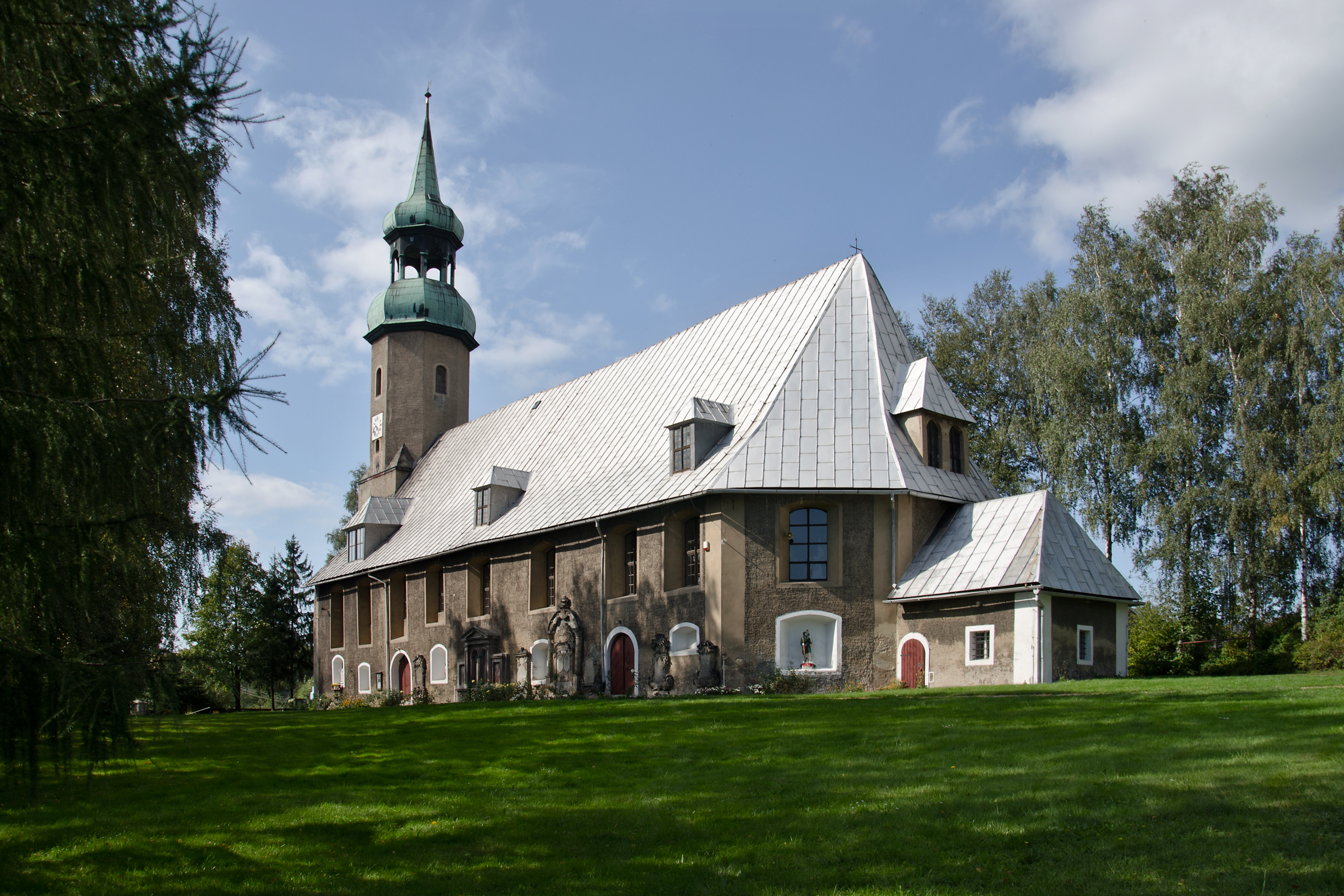
- Church of Saint Michael

- Location within Poland
- Coordinates: 50°59′N 15°21′E
- Country: Poland
- Voivodeship: Lower Silesian
- County: Lwówek
- Gmina: Mirsk
- Time zone: UTC+1 (CET)
  - Summer (DST): UTC+2 (CEST)

Giebułtów [ɡʲɛˈbuu̯tuf] is a village in the administrative district of Gmina Mirsk within Lwówek County, Lower Silesian Voivodeship, in south-western Poland, close to the Czech border. Giebułtów lies approximately 3 km (2 mi) north-west of Mirsk, 23 km (14 mi) south-west of Lwówek Śląski, and 120 km (75 mi) west of the regional capital Wrocław.

== History ==
The village was established in the Middle Ages. It was since ruled by local Polish, Bohemian, Hungarian, and Saxon rulers. In 1815 it was annexed by the Kingdom of Prussia, within which it formed part of the provinces of Silesia and Lower Silesia. From 1871 it was also part of the German Empire.

During World War II Giebułtów was the location of the Nazi German slave labour camp called FAL Gebhardsdorf, one of nearly one hundred subcamps of the Gross-Rosen concentration camp system. The prisoners included 500 Jewish women from Poland and Hungary, who were transported after a selection at Auschwitz, to work for the airplane parts manufacturer Aerobau – Heinrich Lehmann KG in Gebhardsdorf / Isergebirge. They were sent on a death march westward on 18 January 1945.

This region was finally ceded to Poland in 1945 after the border shift after the defeat of Nazi Germany in the war.

== See also ==
- List of subcamps of Gross-Rosen
