= Kłopotnica =

- Village
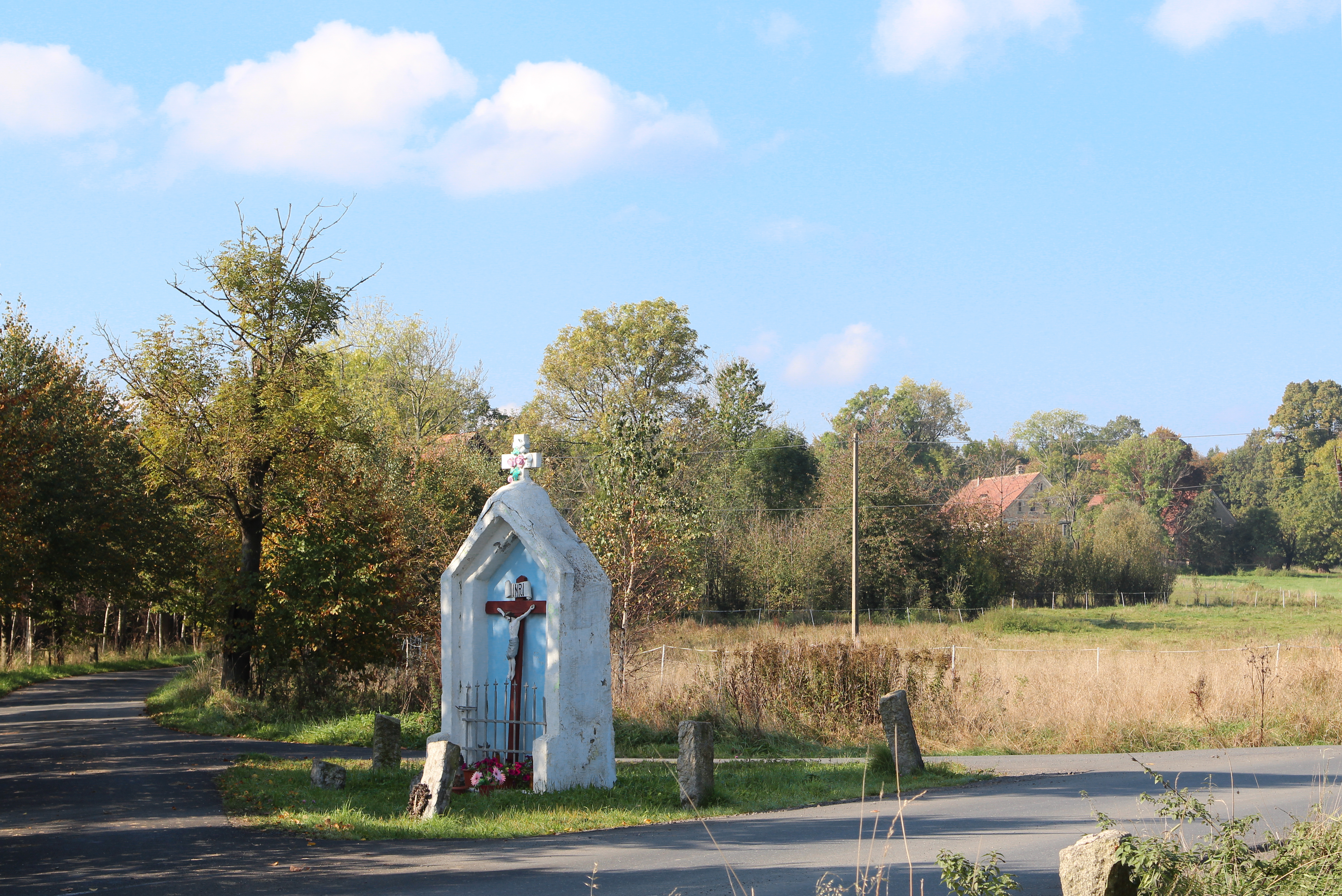
- Center of village.

- Location within Poland
- Coordinates: 50°56′01″N 15°29′42″E
- Country: Poland
- Voivodeship: Lower Silesian
- County: Lwówek
- Gmina: Mirsk
- Time zone: UTC+1 (CET)
  - Summer (DST): UTC+2 (CEST)
- Vehicle registration: DLW

Kłopotnica [kwɔpɔtˈnit͡sa] is a village in the administrative district of Gmina Mirsk, within Lwówek County, Lower Silesian Voivodeship, in south-western Poland, close to the Czech border.
