= Mirsk =

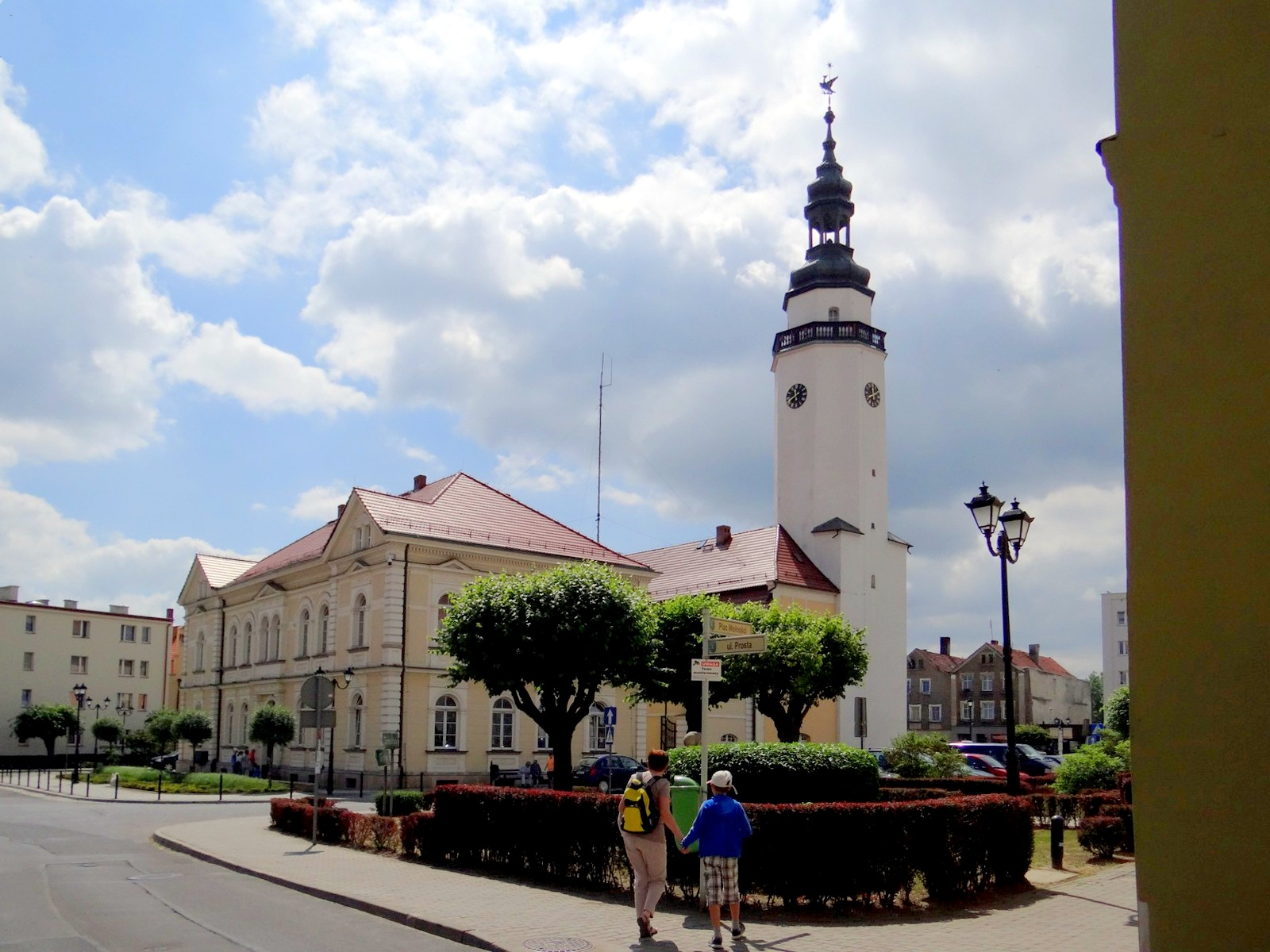
- Mirsk Town Hall

- Flag Coat of arms

- Location within Poland
- Coordinates: 50°58′9″N 15°22′58″E
- Country: Poland
- Voivodeship: Lower Silesian
- County: Lwówek
- Gmina: Mirsk
- Town rights: 1329/1337

Area
  - Total: 14.66 km^{2} (5.66 sq mi)
- Elevation: 350 m (1,150 ft)

Population (2019-06-30)
  - Total: 3,886
  - Density: 265.1/km^{2} (686.5/sq mi)
- Time zone: UTC+1 (CET)
  - Summer (DST): UTC+2 (CEST)
- Area code: +48 75
- Vehicle registration: DLW
- Climate: Dfb
- Website: http://www.mirsk.pl

Mirsk [mʲirsk] (German: Friedeberg am Queis) is a town in Lwówek County, Lower Silesian Voivodeship, in south-western Poland. It is the seat of the administrative district (gmina) called Gmina Mirsk, close to the Czech border. It is situated on the upper Kwisa river north of the Jizera Mountains, within the historic region of Lower Silesia. As of 2019, the town has a population of 3,886.

== History ==
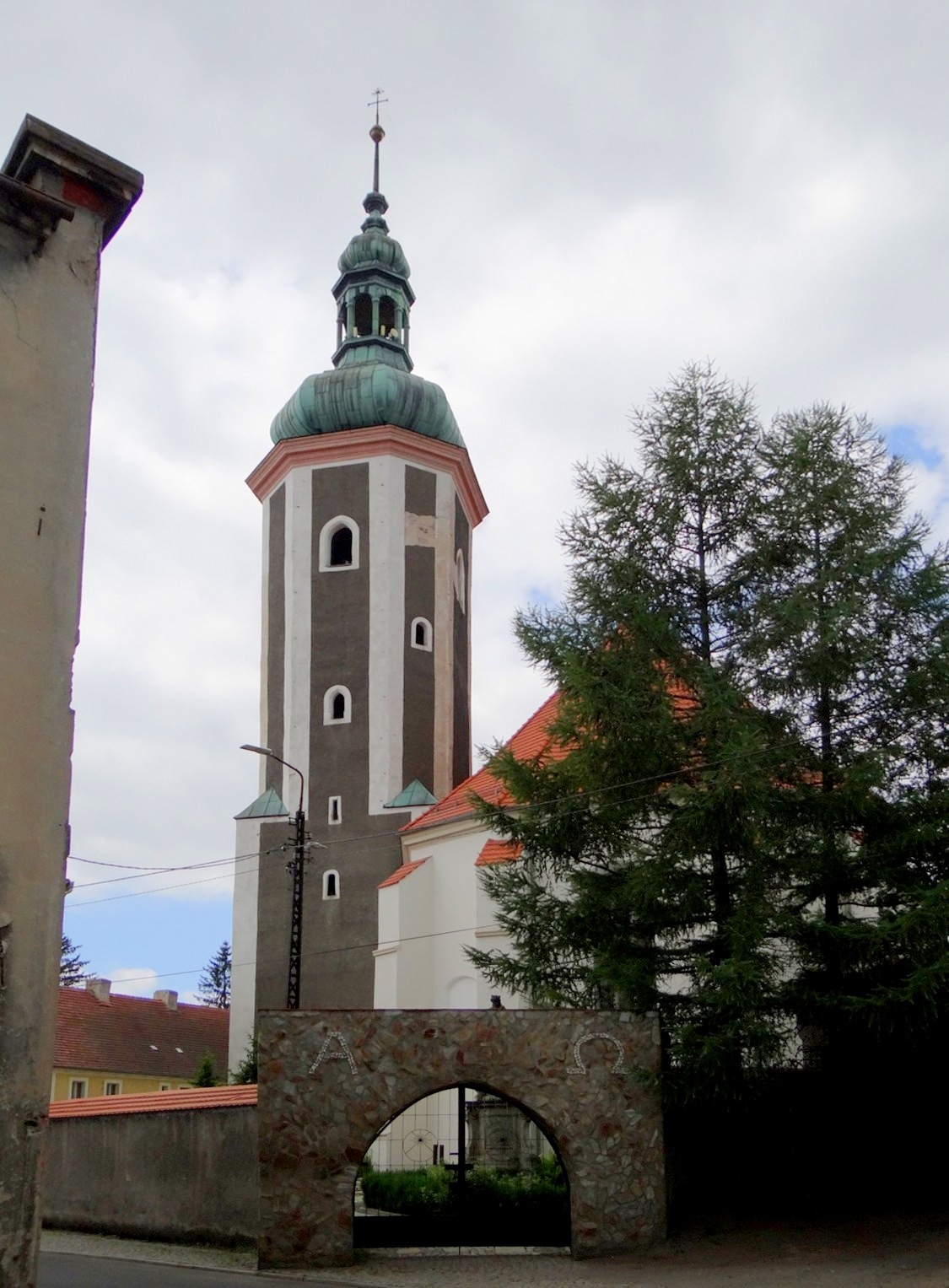
Gothic-Renaissance Church of the Annunciation of Mary

The settlement arose in the 13th century where the medieval trade route from Hirschberg (Jelenia Góra) to Zittau crossed the border with Upper Lusatia. As a result of the fragmentation of Poland, in 1319 it became part the small Piast-ruled Duchy of Jawor. It was granted town privileges modelled after nearby Löwenberg (Lwówek Śląski) by the Duke Henry I of Jawor in 1337 (according to other sources in 1329). Upon the death of his successor Duke Bolko II the Small in 1368, it passed to the Bohemian Crown and was enfeoffed to the noble House of Schaffgotsch in 1425. In 1431 it was successfully defended against the Hussites. An annual fair took place in the town from 1521. The town was one of the largest centers of linen cloth production in Silesia, as of the late 16th century. During the Thirty Years' War, troops from various countries plundered the town as many as 31 times.

With most of Silesia, Austria ceded Friedeberg to Prussia in the Treaty of Breslau of 1742. The town was incorporated into the Silesia Province. Barracks for French troops were built near the town during the Napoleonic Wars. Four annual fairs were held in the town in the late 19th century. The town received railroad connections with Gryfów in 1884, Jindřichovice pod Smrkem in 1904 and Świeradów in 1909.

In 1938, part of the village of Skarbków was merged with the town. During World War II, the Nazis created a forced labour camp for Jewish women at a linen spinning mill in Skarbków, which in 1944 became a subcamp of the Gross-Rosen concentration camp. In January 1945, the camp was dissolved and the prisoners were moved to a subcamp of Gross-Rosen in Chrastava in German-occupied Czechoslovakia.

After surrender of Nazi Germany, the border changes demanded by the Soviet Union at the Potsdam Conference placed the town in Poland. On June 24, 1945, Polish troops forced deportation of many townspeople, who had to march for two days by Mroczkowice, Wolimierz and finally to Radomierzyce. However, most returned to their homes, and suffered oppression and plundering by Polish militia. Eventually, all population had to leave their home on July 11, 1945. Polish settlers arrived to settle the town.

In 1961 the entire village of Skarbków was included within the town limits.

=== Former names ===
German names, 1201–1945: Eulendorf, Fridberg, Friedeberg; Friedeberg am Queis to distinguish it from Brandenburgian Friedeberg (Strzelce Krajeńskie), Friedeberg/Isergebirge from 1934; for a short period after World War II literally translated as Polish: Spokojna Góra meaning "peaceful mountain". The present name, adopted in 1947, is derived from the word "mir", an archaic word for "peace".

== Demographics ==
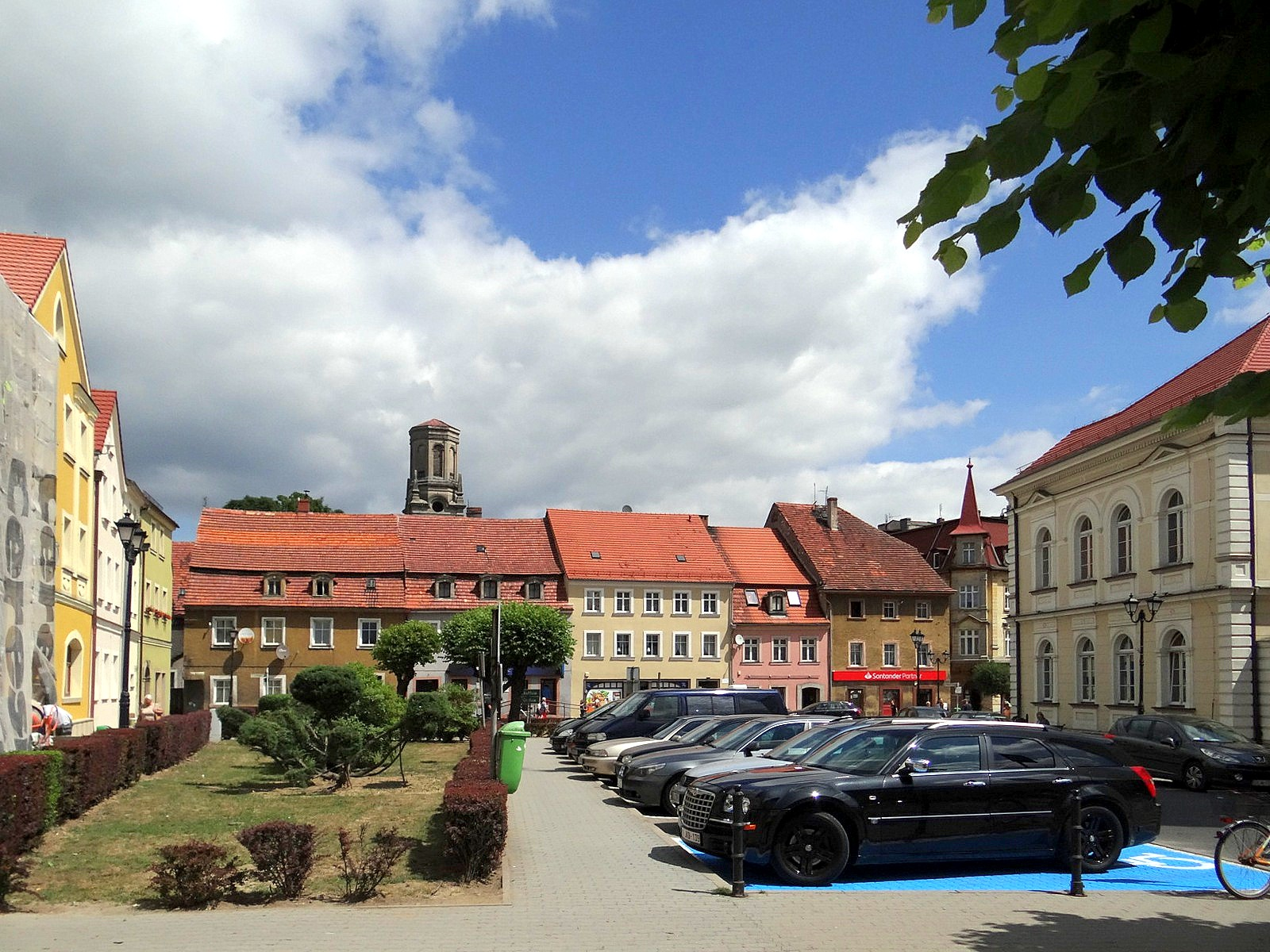
Plac Wolności (Freedom Square)

Historical population

Year	Pop.	±%
1880	2,722	—
1890	2,670	−1.9%
1900	2,631	−1.5%
1910	2,553	−3.0%
1925	2,523	−1.2%

Year	Pop.	±%
1939	2,883	+14.3%
1950	2,388	−17.2%
1960	3,962	+65.9%
2010	4,111	+3.8%

== Sports ==
The local football club is Włókniarz Mirsk. It competes in the lower divisions.

== Twin towns – sister cities ==
See twin towns of Gmina Mirsk.
