= Brzeziniec, Lower Silesian Voivodeship =

Brzeziniec
- Village
- Location within Poland
- Coordinates: 50°59′44″N 15°23′44″E
- Country: Poland
- Voivodeship: Lower Silesian
- County: Lwówek
- Gmina: Mirsk
- Time zone: UTC+1 (CET)
  - Summer (DST): UTC+2 (CEST)
- Vehicle registration: DLW

Brzeziniec [bʐɛˈʑiɲɛt͡s] is a village in the administrative district of Gmina Mirsk, within Lwówek County, Lower Silesian Voivodeship, in south-western Poland, close to the Czech border.

During World War II, a German forced labour subcamp of the prison in Jawor was operated in the village.
