= Grudza =

- Village
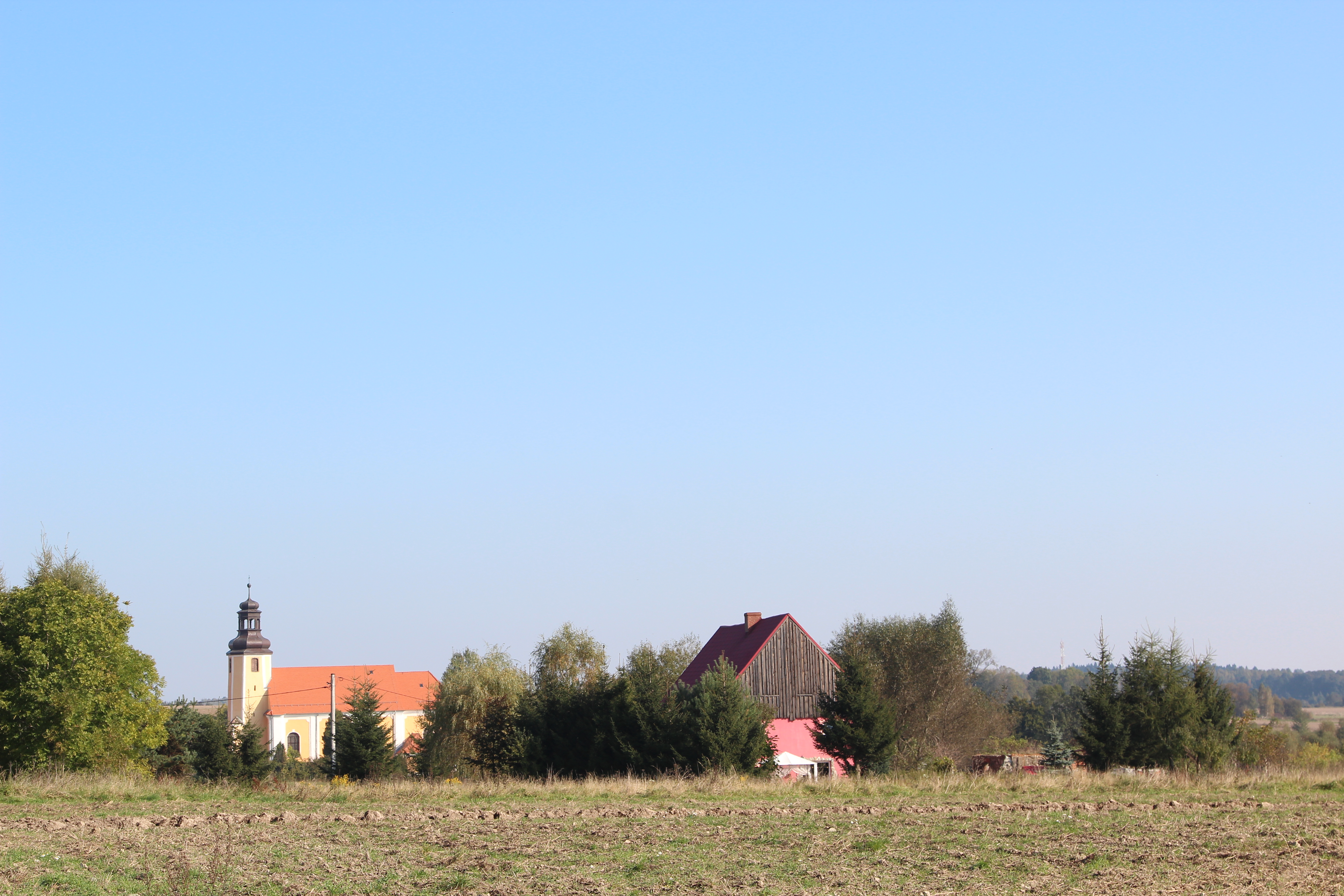

- Location within Poland
- Coordinates: 50°56′51″N 15°30′24″E
- Country: Poland
- Voivodeship: Lower Silesian
- County: Lwówek
- Gmina: Mirsk

Grudza [ˈɡrud͡za] is a village in the administrative district of Gmina Mirsk, within Lwówek County, Lower Silesian Voivodeship, in south-western Poland, close to the Czech border.
