= Mlądz, Lwówek County =

Mlądz
- Village
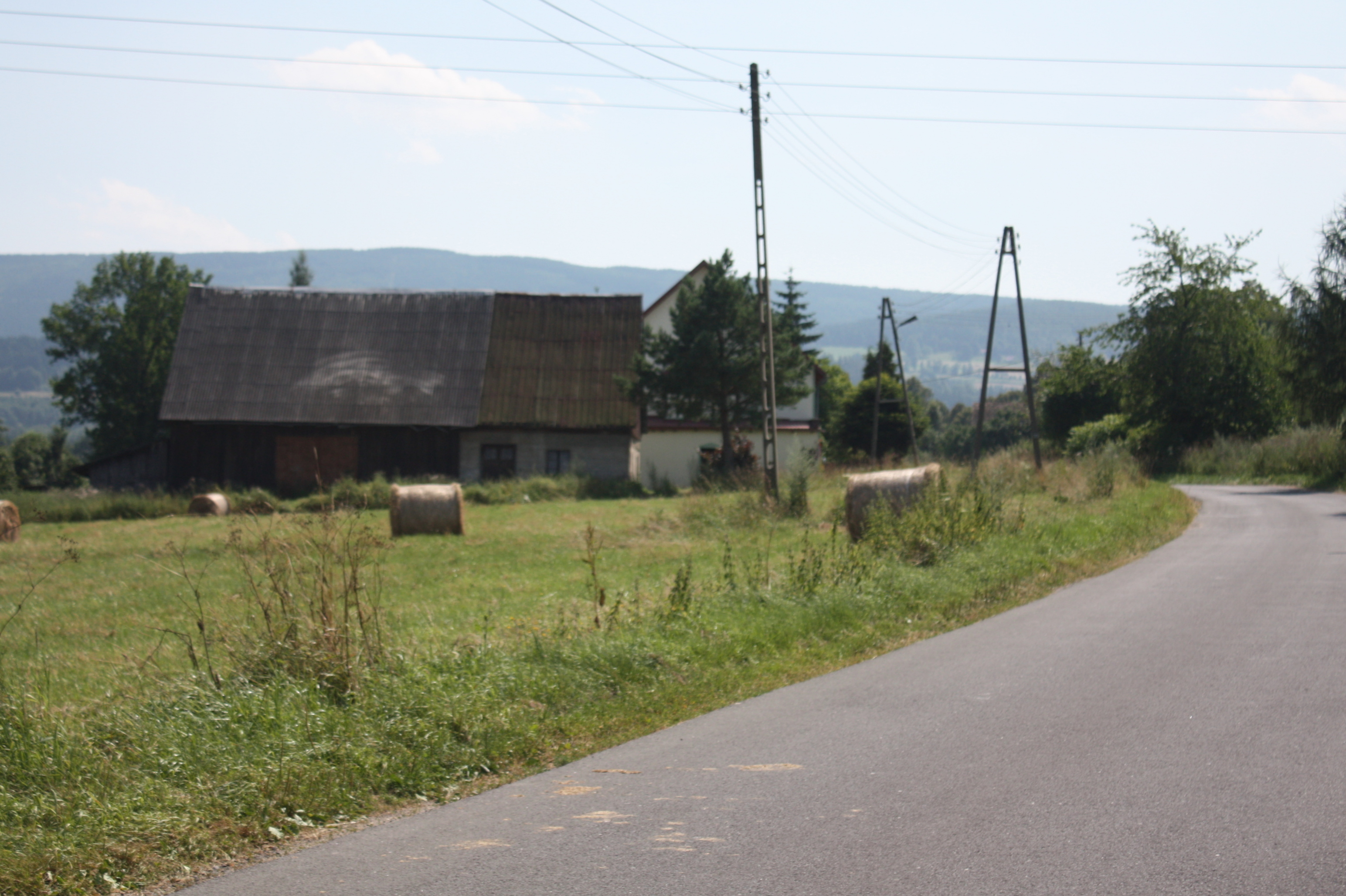

- Location within Poland
- Coordinates: 50°57′N 15°25′E
- Country: Poland
- Voivodeship: Lower Silesian
- County: Lwówek
- Gmina: Mirsk
- Population (approx.): 100

Mlądz [mlɔnt͡s] is a village in the administrative district of Gmina Mirsk, within Lwówek County, Lower Silesian Voivodeship, in south-western Poland, close to the Czech border.
