= Krobica =

- Village
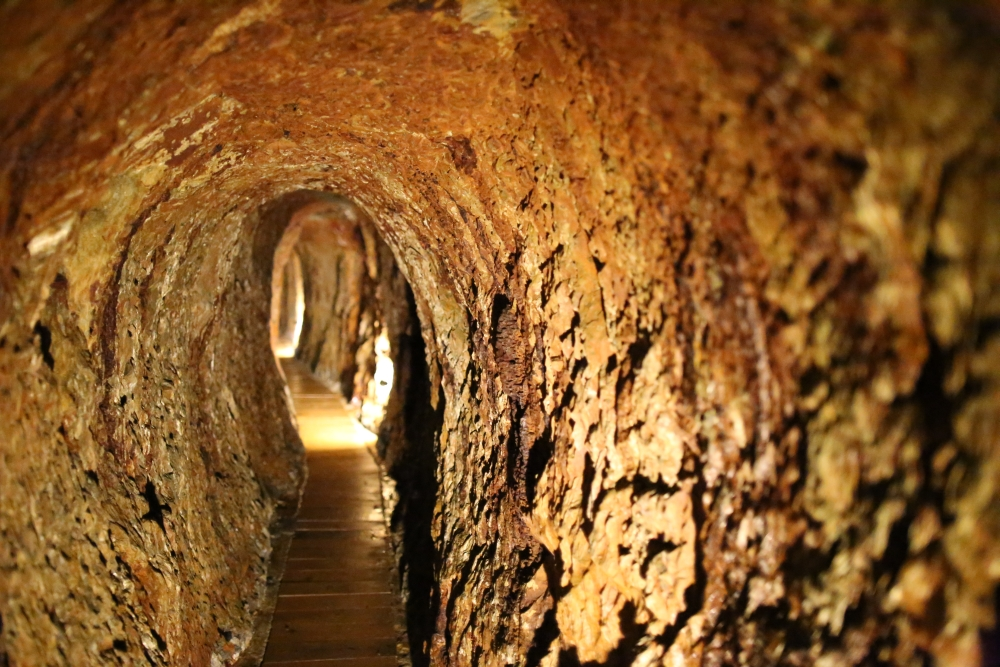
- Underground tourist route in a former tin and cobalt mine

- Location within Poland
- Coordinates: 50°55′40″N 15°21′08″E
- Country: Poland
- Voivodeship: Lower Silesian
- County: Lwówek
- Gmina: Mirsk
- Highest elevation: 460 m (1,510 ft)
- Lowest elevation: 400 m (1,300 ft)

Population
  - Total: 360
- Time zone: UTC+1 (CET)
  - Summer (DST): UTC+2 (CEST)
- Vehicle registration: DLW

Krobica [krɔˈbit͡sa] is a village in the administrative district of Gmina Mirsk, within Lwówek County, Lower Silesian Voivodeship, in south-western Poland, close to the Czech border.

There is an underground tourist route in the former tin and cobalt mine.

A trade route connecting Jelenia Góra with Frýdlant and Zittau passed through the village in the late medieval and early modern periods.
