= Orłowice =

- Village
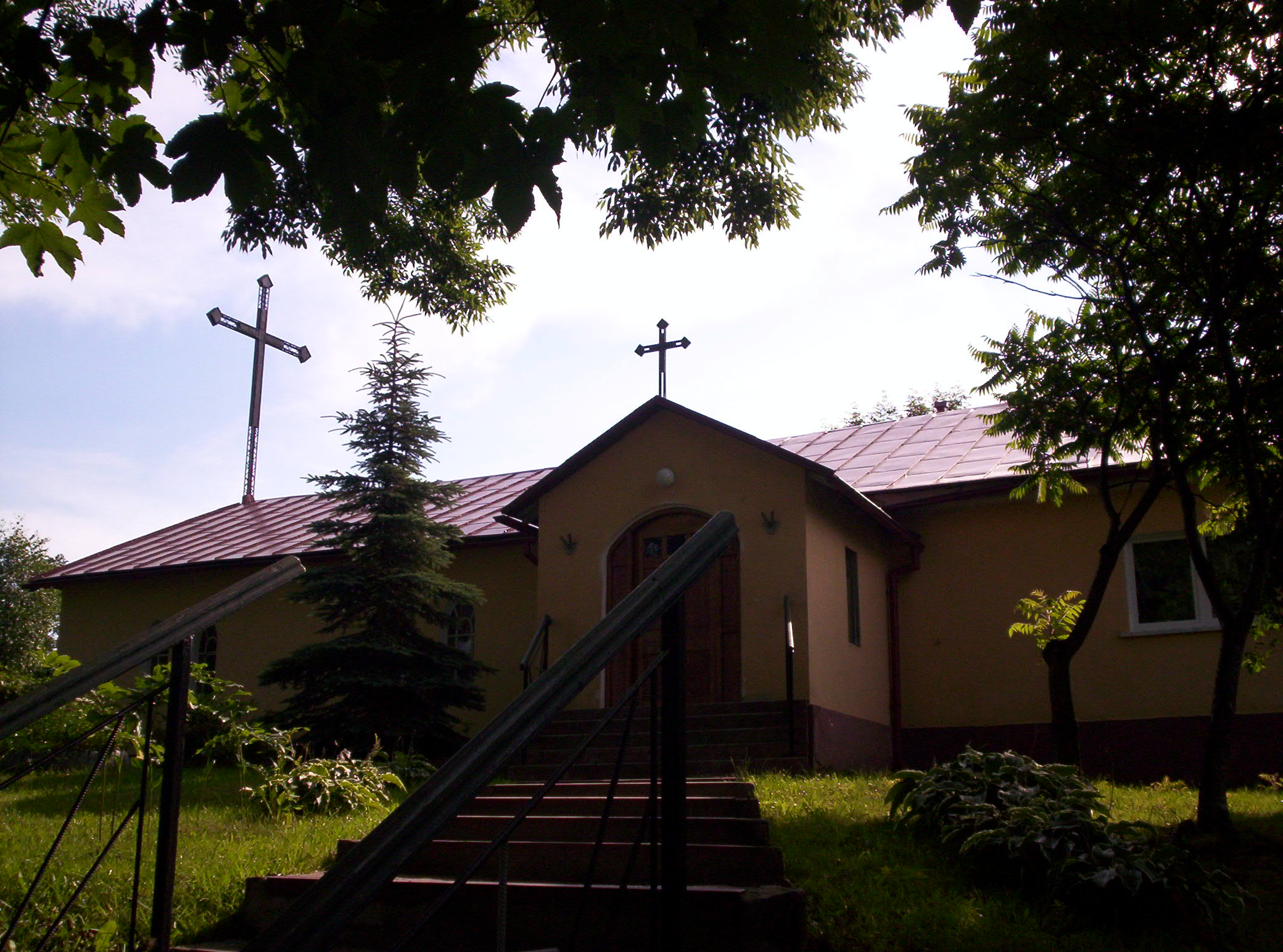
- Orłowice chapel

- Location within Poland
- Coordinates: 50°55′N 15°21′E
- Country: Poland
- Voivodeship: Lower Silesian
- County: Lwówek
- Gmina: Mirsk
- Earliest record: 1373

Government
  - Sołtys: Zdzisław Panasewicz
- Highest elevation: 450 m (1,480 ft)
- Lowest elevation: 390 m (1,280 ft)
- Population (2005): 343
- Time zone: UTC+1 (CET)
  - Summer (DST): UTC+2 (CEST)
- Vehicle registration: DLW=

Orłowice [ɔrwɔˈvit͡sɛ] is a village in the administrative district of Gmina Mirsk, within Lwówek County, Lower Silesian Voivodeship, in south-western Poland, close to the Czech border.

== History ==
The village is first mentioned in 1373, when it was called Albrechtsdorf. In 1575 its name changed to Ullersdorf, in honour of Ulryk von Schaffgotsch. The village's paper mill is first mentioned in 1575, making it the oldest such mill in this part of the Sudetes.

A railway passing through the village was opened in 1909. The line was closed in 1997.

== Industry ==
On west from village, at Zajęcznik (595 m) foot is quarry "Jerzy" state in which was mined. The factory of felt plates was in village second the largest industrial institution. This institution does not function at present (it was done away). It from acting at present in village of typically industrial institutions there is the sawmill.

== Transport ==
They through village lead two province roads:

- province road No. 361
- province road No. 404
