= Kotlina, Lower Silesian Voivodeship =

Kotlina
- Village
- Location within Poland
- Coordinates: 50°55′31″N 15°23′12″E
- Country: Poland
- Voivodeship: Lower Silesian
- County: Lwówek
- Gmina: Mirsk

Kotlina [kɔˈtlina] is a village in the administrative district of Gmina Mirsk, within Lwówek County, Lower Silesian Voivodeship, in south-western Poland, close to the Czech border.
