= Mroczkowice, Lower Silesian Voivodeship =

Mroczkowice
- Village
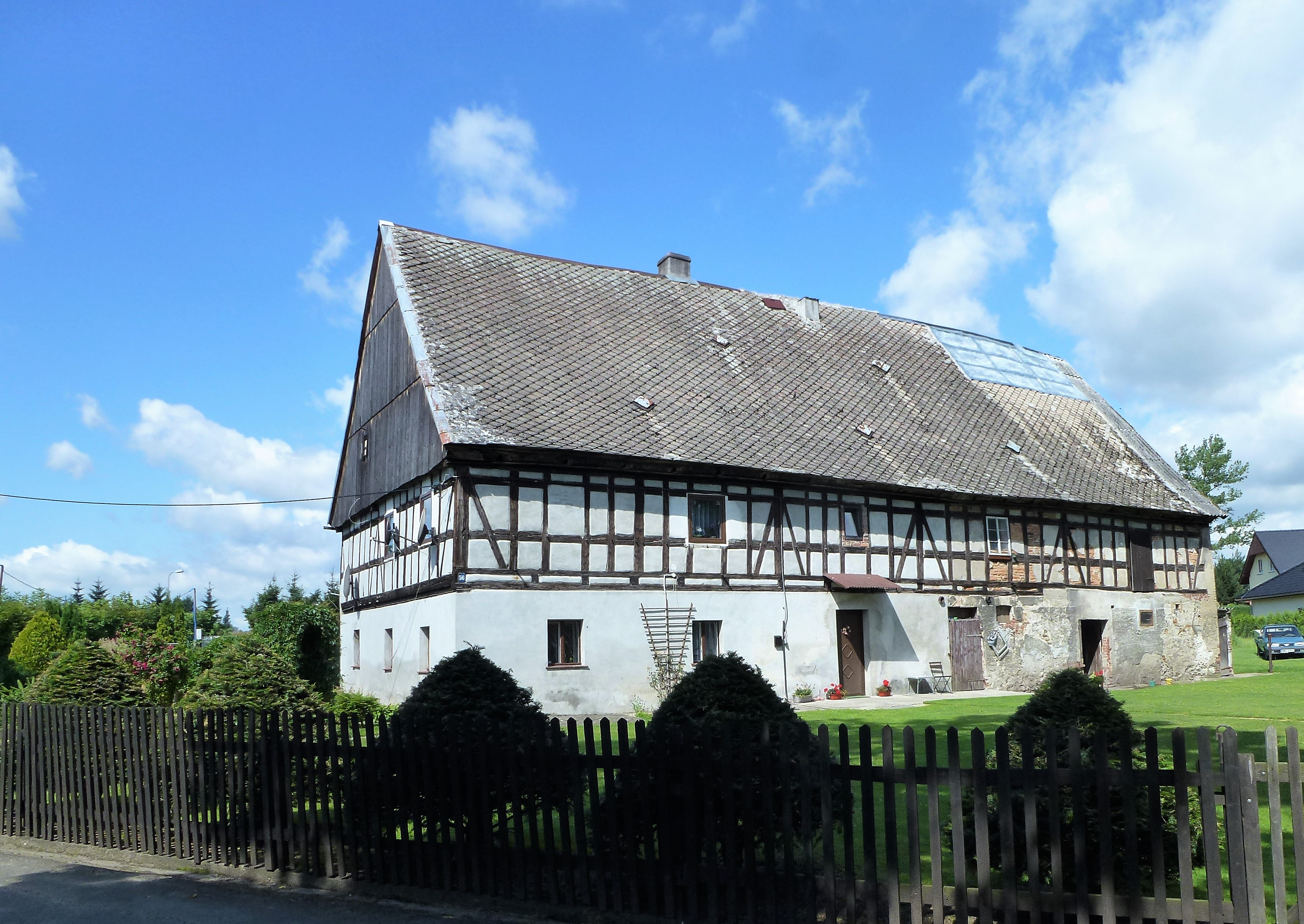

- Location within Poland
- Coordinates: 50°57′14″N 15°22′07″E
- Country: Poland
- Voivodeship: Lower Silesian
- County: Lwówek
- Gmina: Mirsk

Population
  - Total: 284
- Time zone: UTC+1 (CET)
  - Summer (DST): UTC+2 (CEST)
- Postal code: 59-630
- Vehicle registration: DLW

Mroczkowice (Polish: [mrɔt͡ʂkɔˈvit͡sɛ]) is a village in the administrative district of Gmina Mirsk, within Lwówek County, Lower Silesian Voivodeship, in south-western Poland, close to the Czech border.

During World War II, Nazi Germany operated a forced labour camp for Jews in the village.
