= Gmina Mirsk =

Gmina Mirsk Mirsk Commune
- Gmina
- Coat of arms
- Interactive map of Gmina Mirsk
- Coordinates (Mirsk): 50°58′9″N 15°22′58″E
- Country: Poland
- Voivodeship: Lower Silesian
- County: Lwówek
- Seat: Mirsk
- Sołectwos: Brzeziniec, Gajówka, Giebułtów, Gierczyn, Grudza, Kamień, Karłowiec, Kłopotnica, Kotlina, Krobica, Kwieciszowice, Mlądz, Mroczkowice, Orłowice, Proszowa, Przecznica, Rębiszów

Area
  - Total: 186.57 km^{2} (72.04 sq mi)

Population (2019-06-30)
  - Total: 8,622
  - Density: 46.21/km^{2} (119.7/sq mi)
  - Urban: 3,886
  - Rural: 4,736
- Website: http://www.mirsk.pl

Gmina Mirsk is an urban-rural gmina (administrative district) in Lwówek County, Lower Silesian Voivodeship, in south-western Poland, on the Czech border. Its seat is the town of Mirsk, which lies approximately 22 kilometres (14 mi) south-west of Lwówek Śląski, and 118 kilometres (73 mi) west of the regional capital Wrocław.

The gmina covers an area of 186.57 square kilometres (72.0 sq mi), and as of 2019 its total population is 8,622.

== Neighbouring gminas ==
Gmina Mirsk is bordered by the towns of Świeradów-Zdrój and Szklarska Poręba, and the gminas of Gryfów Śląski, Leśna, Lubomierz and Stara Kamienica. It also borders the Czech Republic.

== Villages ==
Apart from the town of Mirsk, the gmina contains the villages of Brzeziniec, Gajówka, Giebułtów, Gierczyn, Grudza, Kamień, Karłowiec, Kłopotnica, Kotlina, Krobica, Kwieciszowice, Mlądz, Mroczkowice, Orłowice, Proszowa, Przecznica and Rębiszów.

== Twin towns – sister cities ==
Gmina Mirsk is twinned with:

- Dubá, Czech Republic
- Lázně Libverda, Czech Republic
- Nové Město pod Smrkem, Czech Republic
