= Feliks Petančić =

Diplomat, historian and miniature painter

Feliks Petančić (c. 1455 – c. 1520), known in Latin as Felix Petancius and in Italian as Felice Petanzio, was a Renaissance humanist, historian, scribe and illustrator. A native of Dubrovnik, he worked as a diplomat for both the Republic of Ragusa and the Kingdom of Hungary. His diplomatic travels took him to France, Italy and the Ottoman Empire.

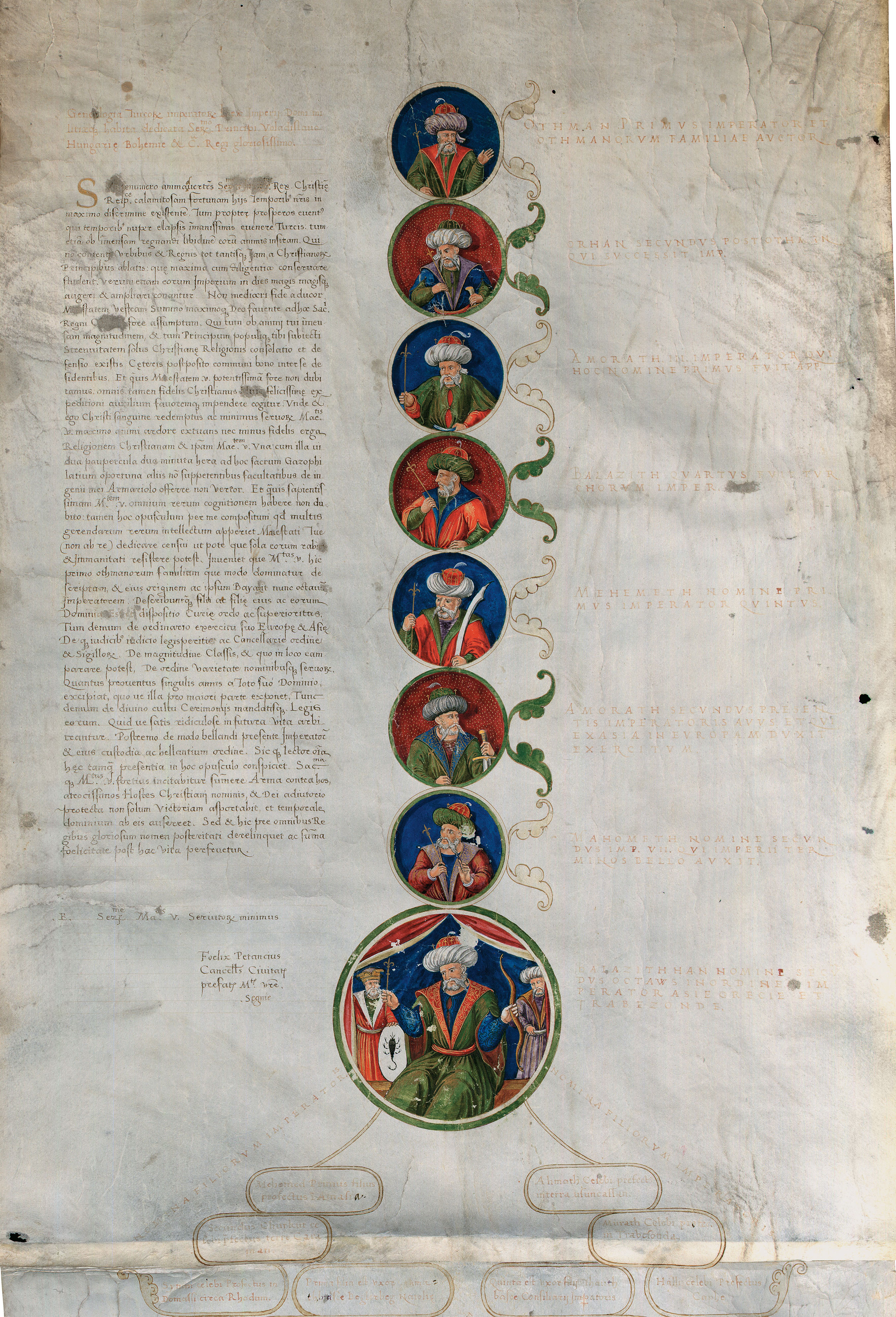
Illustrated list of Ottoman sultans in the presentation copy of the Genealogia

Petančić is considered one of the Croatian Latinists. Three works of varying originality are attributed to him. All concern the Ottoman wars in Europe. Historia Turcica, a history of the Ottoman Empire, is partially original and partially copied from a work by Niccolò Sagundino. Quibus itineribus Turci sint aggrediendi, on the geography of the Ottoman Balkans, is plagiarised from a work by Martin Segon. Genealogia Turcorum imperatorum discusses the internal state of the Ottoman Empire. It is based on firsthand experience. In addition to his writings, Petančić contributed illuminated manuscripts to the Bibliotheca Corviniana in Hungary.

== Life ==
Petančić was born in Dubrovnik in the Republic of Ragusa around 1455. His godfather and patron was Kristofor Stojković, bishop of Modruš. He was educated locally and worked as a teacher from 1478 to 1482, when he became the chancellor of the criminal court. Through the influence of Stojković, he was appointed supervisor or lector of the scriptorium of the Hungarian royal court in Buda in 1487. He worked as a calligrapher and miniaturist. Following the death of King Matthias Corvinus in 1490, he returned to Dubrovnik. In 1492, 1493 and 1495, he represented the Republic on diplomatic missions to Hungary. He was also sent to Naples.

In 1496, Petančić became a notary and judge. Also that year, probably through the influence of Stojković, he was appointed chancellor of Senj in Croatia. King Vladislaus II sent him on diplomatic missions to France (1500) and Venice in connection with the Ottoman–Hungarian war of 1500–1503. In 1502, he was sent to Rhodes to negotiate with the Knights Hospitaller for a crusade against the Ottomans. In 1510, he was sent to Spain as part of Hungary's negotiations regarding joining the League of Cambrai. He then went to Dubrovnik to court the Republic into an alliance against Venice to reconquer Dalmatia. Nothing came of these proposals.

In 1512, Petančić was sent to Constantinople to negotiate an extension to the Ottoman–Hungarian truce. Records indicate that this was not his first trip to Constantinople, but of the circumstances of his earlier visits nothing is known. He returned from his embassy in late June 1512. The date of his death is uncertain. He was still living in 1517, when he built a funerary monument to Stojković in the church of Saints Philip and James in Novi Vinodolski. It is still there. Petančić was already dead when his book Quibus itineribus Turci sint aggrediendi was first printed in 1522.

== Works ==
Bayezid II depicted as more fond of food, drink and his harem than of his throne in a copy of the Historia Turcica

Petančić's three known works are Historia Turcica, Quibus itineribus Turci sint aggrediendi and Genealogia Turcorum imperatorum. They were all written during his period of diplomatic activity in connection with the 1500–1503 war. All concern the Ottoman Empire, were written in Latin for the Hungarian court and are dedicated to Vladislaus II. The Quibus itineribus and the Genealogia were reprinted many times in the sixteenth century, establishing Petančić's reputation as an Ottoman expert. Petančić himself copied and illustrated the dedication copies of his Historia and the Genealogia. Several other manuscripts illustrated by him have been identified among the former collection of the Bibliotheca Corviniana. The only contemporary source that explicitly refers to him as a painter is Nicolaus Olahus's Hungaria et Attila.

=== Historia Turcica ===
The earliest is conventionally entitled Historia Imperatorum Regni Turcici, or Historia Turcica ("Turkish History") for short. It was written between June and October 1501. It is a history of the Ottomans from the first sultan, Osman I, down to the reigning sultan, Bayezid II. About half the work is devoted to the reign of Mehmed II (1444–1446, 1451–1481). The first part of the work, down to the start of Mehmed's reign, is drawn without attribution from Niccolò Sagundino's De familia Otthomanorum epitome. The remainder appears to be mostly an original work. The prologue and epilogue encourage Vladislaus and the other monarchs of Europe to avenge the Crusade of Varna (1443–1444) by waging war against the Ottomans.

The Historia is preserved in a single manuscript, now shelfmark Solger 31.2 in the Stadtbibliothek Nürnberg. It lacks both a title and an attribution. It is partially damaged because some miniatures depicting the sultans were cut out at some point. Other illustrations were left unfinished and the manuscript was probably never presented to the king. The text is attributed to Petančić on the basis of its script and illustrations, making it an autograph manuscript. Agostino Pertusi has questioned this attribution, but it remains standard. Alberto Saviello questions whether Petančić was in fact the illustrator. The text has never been printed.

=== Quibus itineribus Turci sint aggrediendi ===
The Quibus itineribus Turci sint aggrediendi ("The Routes By Which the Turks Should Be Attacked") is attributed to Petančić in the first edition published at Vienna by Johannes Cuspinian in 1522 under the title De itineribus in Turciam libellus Felice Petantio cancellario Segniae autore. It was published 23 times down to 1664. No manuscript earlier than the first printing is known. All surviving manuscript copies are based on the printed text. It was a popular work. A German translation was on its third printing in 1558, an Italian translation survives in manuscript from the sixteenth century and Serbian and Croatian translations were published in the nineteenth century.

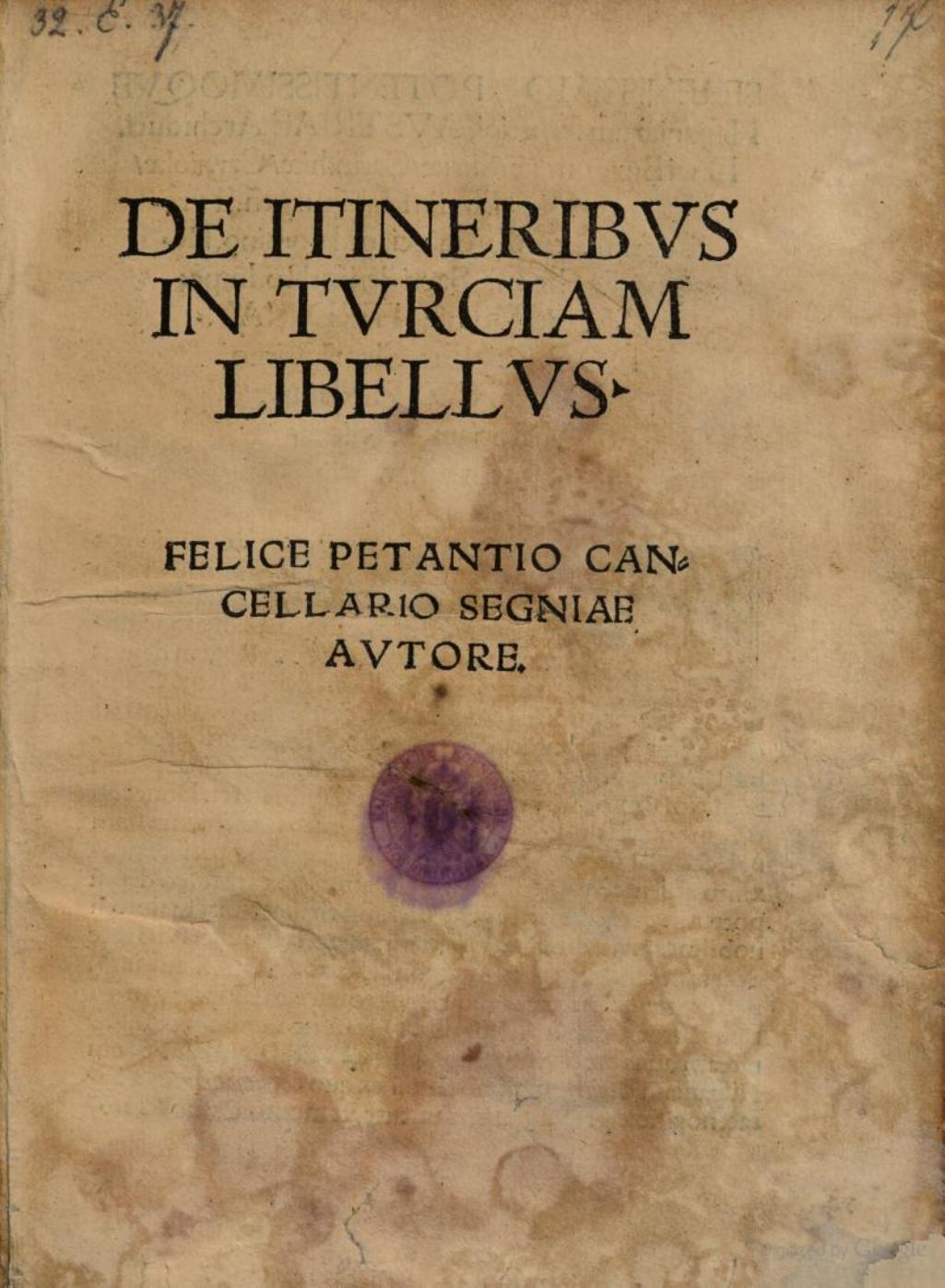
Titlepage from the first edition of the Quibus itineribus

In 1981, Pertusi published a critical edition of the text and demonstrated that it is not an original work by Petančić. Quibus itineribus was written by Martin Segon in 1480 and survives in a single manuscript. The text printed in Petančić's name is almost identical. He copied the text in 1502, omitting a few chapters and changing the dedication. It provides advice on the land routes to and through the Ottoman Empire in the Balkans for the purposes of military planning. Petančić's purpose in plagiarizing an obscure treatise and rededicating it to Vladislaus under his own name was almost certainly to promote an anti-Ottoman crusade.

=== Genealogia Turcorum imperatorum ===
The Genealogia Turcorum imperatorum, lex imperii domi militiaeque habita ("Genealogy of the Turkish Emperors and the Regulation of Their Empire at Home and at War") is an account of the Ottoman administration, judiciary, army and finances with a description of Ottoman origins, their empire's territorial extent and a list of sultans. In the epilogue of the first redaction, Petančić describes his work thus:

These are the things that I have ascertained by careful investigation about the Empire of the Turks during my long travels; for indeed, my city, Dubrovnik, which is located on their borders, conducts a lot of business with these peoples.

The Genealogia is preserved in two redactions. The first and longer is preserved in two manuscripts, including Cuspinian's copy from the 1520s. The abridged second redaction is known only from the illustrated dedication copy in the form of a roll made for Vladislaus II in 1502, now Lat. 378 in the National Széchényi Library. The second redaction includes a short section on Ottoman laws and customs, which is the only place in his works that he discusses Islam in any depth, commenting on jihad, ritual ablution, abstinence from alcohol, virgins in heaven, the call to prayer and Ramadan ending in Bayram. The roll is commonly assumed to have been the work of Petančić himself.

The first edition of the Genealogia was printed by Konrad Adelmann at Haguenau in 1530 under the title De origine, ordine et militari disciplina Magni Turcae domi forisque habita Libellus. It was printed four more times in the sixteenth century. In 1596, Nicolaus Reusner published the Genealogia under the title Oratio exhortatio ad bellum Turcis inferendum as an anonymous speech given before the Emperor Maximilian I.

== Bibliography ==
- Fodor, Pál; Dávid, Géza (1994). "Hungarian–Ottoman Peace Negotiations in 1512–1514". In Pál Fodor; Géza Dávid (eds.). Hungarian–Ottoman Military and Diplomatic Relations in the Age of Süleyman the Magnificent. Budapest. pp. 9–45.
- Pálosfalvi, Tamás (2018). From Nicopolis to Mohács: A History of Ottoman–Hungarian Warfare, 1389–1526. Brill.
- "Petànzio, Felice Bruto". Enciclopedia on line. Treccani.
- Rakova, Snezhana (2019). "The Last Crusaders: Felix Petančić and the Unfulfilled Crusade of 1502". In Snezhana Rakova; Gheorghe Lazār (eds.). Au Nord et au Sud du Danube: Dynamiques politiques, sociales et religieuses dans le passé [North and South of the Danube: Political, Social and Religious Aspects of the Past]. Brăila. pp. 49–73.
- Saviello, Alberto (2014). "Felix Petancic's Historia Turcica: A Central European View of the Ottoman Empire?". In Robert Born; Andreas Puth (eds.). Osmanischer Orient und Ostmitteleuropa: Perzeptionen und Interaktionen in den Grenzzonen zwischen dem 16. und 18. Jahrhundert. Franz Steiner Verlag. pp. 131–156.
- Špoljarić, Luka (2015). "Feliks Petančić". In David Thomas; John Chesworth; John Azumah; Stanisław Grodź; Andrew Newman; Douglas Pratt (eds.). Christian-Muslim Relations: A Bibliographical History. Vol. 7: Central and Eastern Europe, Asia, Africa and South America (1500–1600). Brill. pp. 50–57.
