= Lwówek Śląski =

Town in Lower Silesian Voivodeship, Poland

- Town
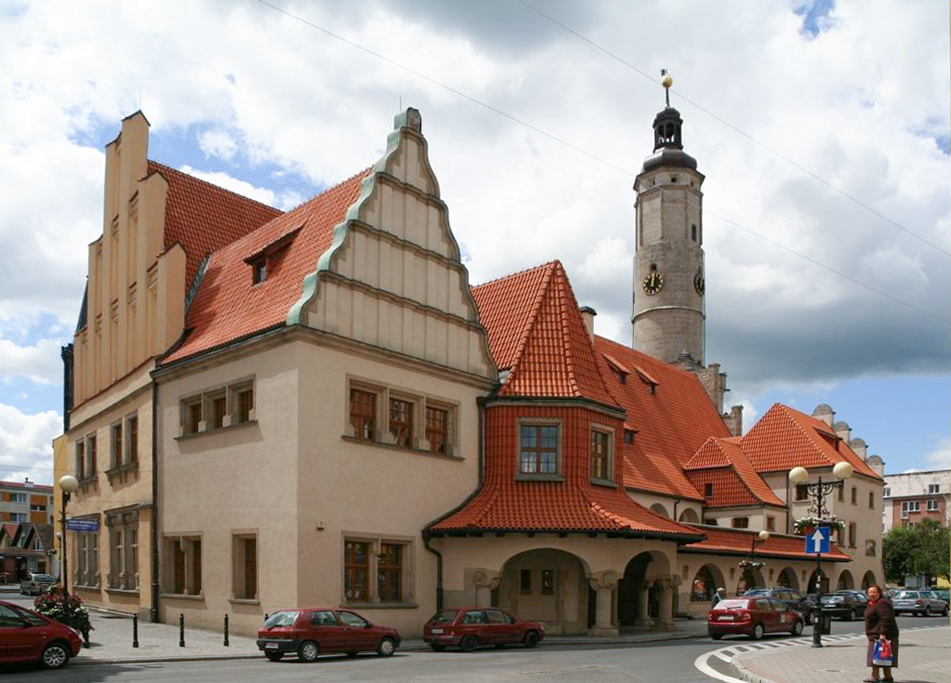
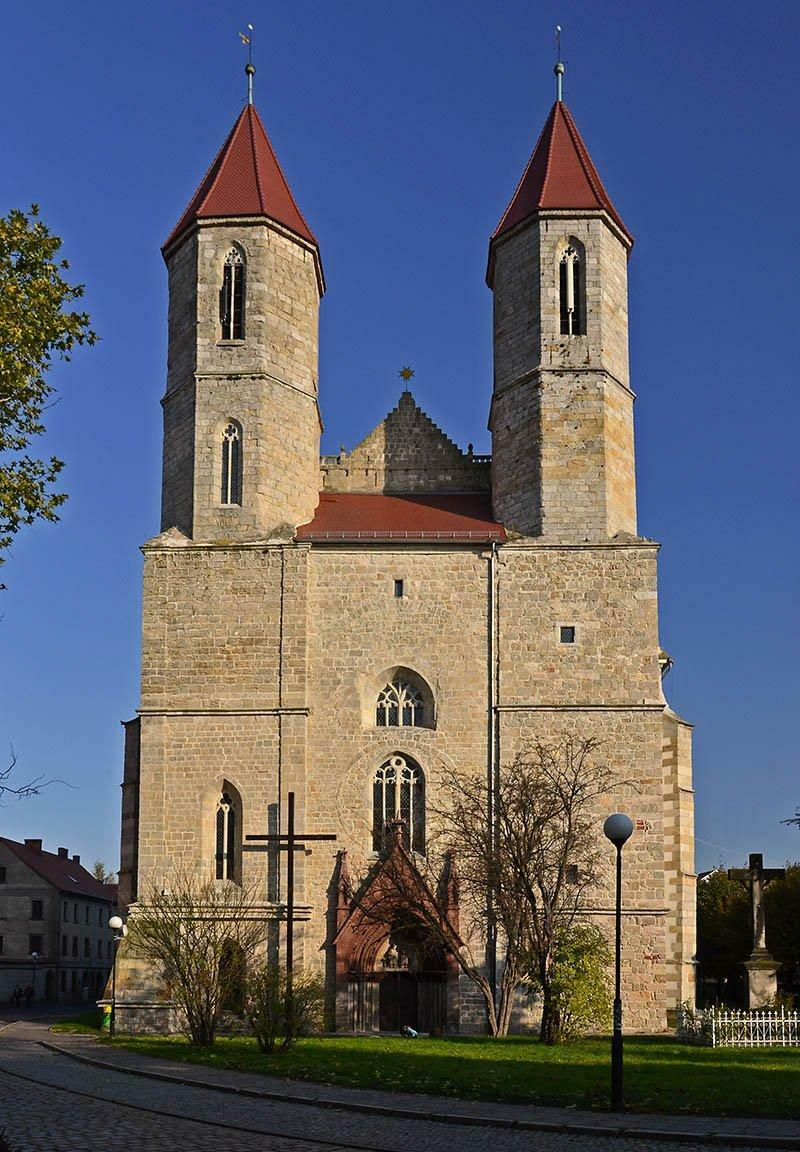
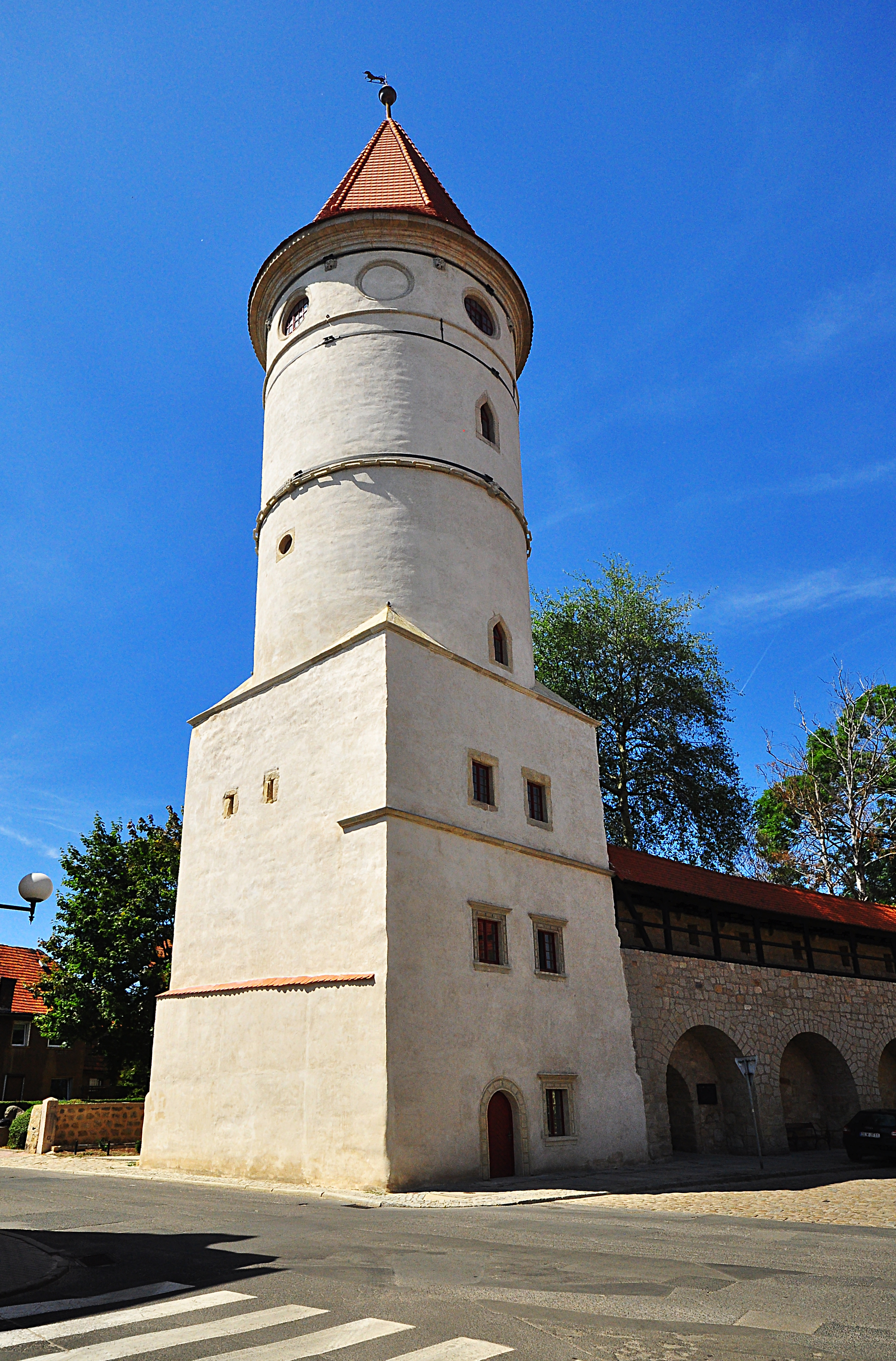
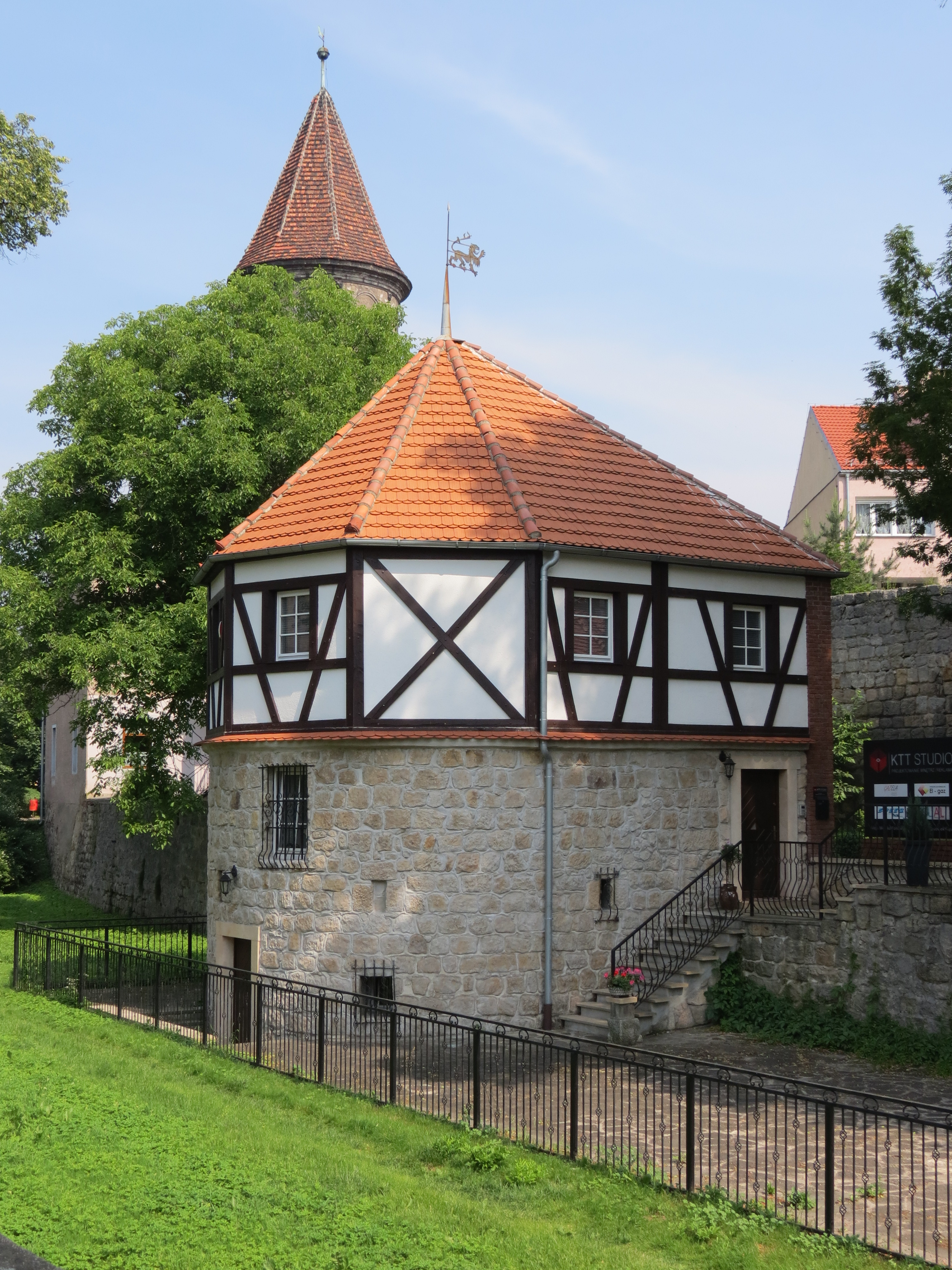
- Town Hall Saint Mary Church Lubań Gate Tower Defensive walls

- Flag Coat of arms
- Nickname: Agate Capital of Poland
- Motto: I love Lwówek Śląski
- Location within Poland
- Coordinates: 51°7′N 15°35′E
- Country: Poland
- Voivodeship: Lower Silesian
- County: Lwówek
- Gmina: Lwówek Śląski
- Established: before 1209
- Town rights: 1217
- Founder: Henry the Bearded
- Named for: Lion

Government
  - Mayor: Dawid Kobiałka

Area
  - Total: 16.65 km^{2} (6.43 sq mi)
- Highest elevation (Skałka): 300 m (980 ft)
- Lowest elevation (Market Square): 205 m (673 ft)

Population (2019-06-30)
  - Total: 8,869
  - Density: 532.7/km^{2} (1,380/sq mi)
- Time zone: UTC+1 (CET)
  - Summer (DST): UTC+2 (CEST)
- Postal code: 59-600
- Area code: +48 75
- Car plates: DLW
- Climate: Dfb
- Website: http://www.lwowekslaski.pl

Lwówek Śląski ([ˈlvuvɛk ˈɕlɔ̃skʲi]; formerly Lwów; German: Löwenberg in Schlesien) is a town in the Lower Silesian Voivodeship in south-western Poland. Situated on the Bóbr River, Lwówek Śląski is about 30 kilometres (19 miles) NNW of Jelenia Góra and has a population of about 9,000 inhabitants. It is the administrative seat of Lwówek County and of the municipality Gmina Lwówek Śląski.

Founded in the 13th century, it was granted town rights in 1217, which became a model of municipal rights for a number of towns in southern Poland, including Cieszyn and Oświęcim, and from 1281 to 1286 it was a local Ducal seat of the Piast dynasty. Its prosperity came from the exploitation of gold and silver deposits, and after their depletion it was a center for cloth and linen making. Lwówek has also been a brewing center since the 13th century, with "Browar Lwówek" brewery being the oldest company in Poland.

Lwówek Śląski is called the Agate Capital of Poland, and hosts the annual Lwówek Agate Summer, the largest mineralogical event in Poland, every second weekend of July.

== History ==
=== Middle Ages ===
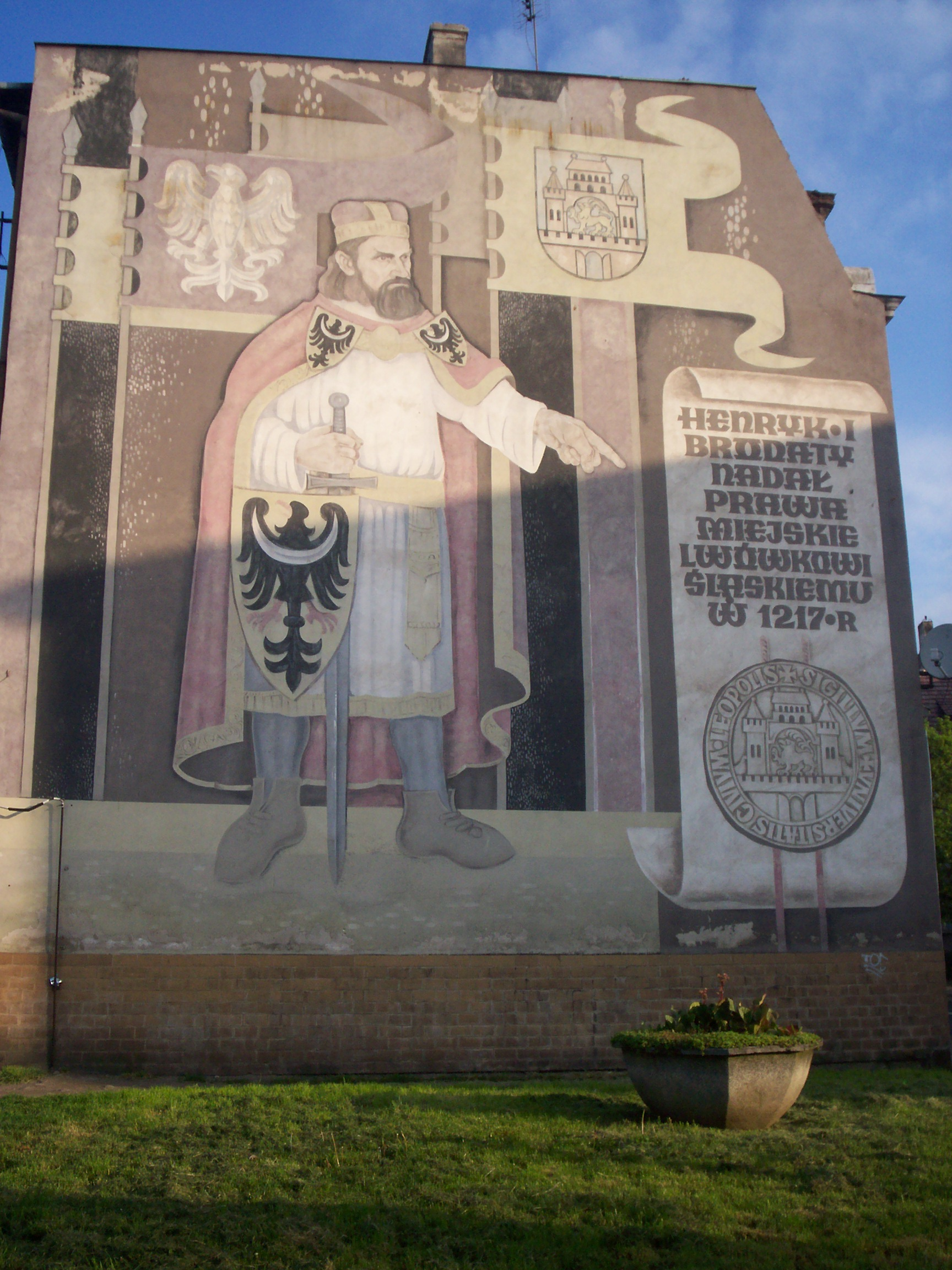
Mural commemorating the granting of town rights by Henry the Bearded in 1217

The vicinity of present-day Lwówek Śląski, densely wooded and located on the inner side of the unsettled Silesian Przesieka within the medieval Kingdom of Poland was gradually cleared and populated by German peasants in the first half of the 13th century during the Ostsiedlung. The town was founded by Duke of Poland Henry the Bearded who designated it for an administrative centre in a previously uninhabited, borderline Polish–Lusatian territory. In 1209 Henry granted it important privileges, such as rights to brew, mill, fish, and hunt within a mile from settlement. German colonists expanded upon the preexisting settlement and in 1217 it was granted town rights by Henry the Bearded, as one of the first cities in Poland (Opole and Racibórz received town rights that same year, earlier only Złotoryja); its style of governance was duplicated by other local towns, such as Bolesławiec, as Löwenberg Rights or Lwówek Śląski Rights. In 1243 Duke Bolesław II Rogatka organized the first knight tournament in Poland in the town. The dukes then constructed a castle, documented for the first time in 1248. In the 13th century Franciscans and Knights Hospitaller settled in the town. As a result of the fragmentation of Poland, it was part of the Duchy of Legnica from 1248, the Duchy of Jawor from 1274, from 1278 to 1286 it was the capital of an eponymous duchy under its only duke Bernard the Lightsome, who took the title of a Duke of Silesia and Lord of Lwówek, and afterwards it was again part of the Duchy of Jawor, which was soon included in the larger Duchy of Świdnica-Jawor, part of which it remained until its dissolution in 1392. In 1327 the town received the right to mint its own coin from Duke Henry I of Jawor, before Wrocław. In 1329 it was one of the largest cities in Silesia. In the 13th and 14th centuries distinctive landmarks of Lwówek were built, including the defensive walls with the Lubańska and Bolesławiecka towers, the town hall (later expanded) and the Gothic churches of St. Mary and of St. Francis.

After the death of Duchess Agnes of Habsburg, the widow of Bolko II, the last Polish Piast Duke of Świdnica, the town with the duchy passed to the Kingdom of Bohemia in 1392. Löwenberg's placement on a trade route allowed it to become one of the more prosperous towns in Bohemia. In 1469 it passed to Hungary and in 1490 again to Bohemia, then ruled by Polish prince Vladislaus II Jagiellon, son of King Casimir IV of Poland. In 1498 Vladislaus II granted the coat of arms, still used today. The town remained under the rule of the Jagiellonian dynasty until 1526 when it passed with the Bohemian Crown to the Habsburg monarchy of Austria.

=== Modern era ===
During the Thirty Years' War, Löwenberg was devastated by Swedish and Imperial troops, especially between 1633 and 1643. By the Peace of Westphalia in 1648, the town was largely destroyed and had a decimated population of only hundreds.

The prints of Lwówek Śląski during the centuries
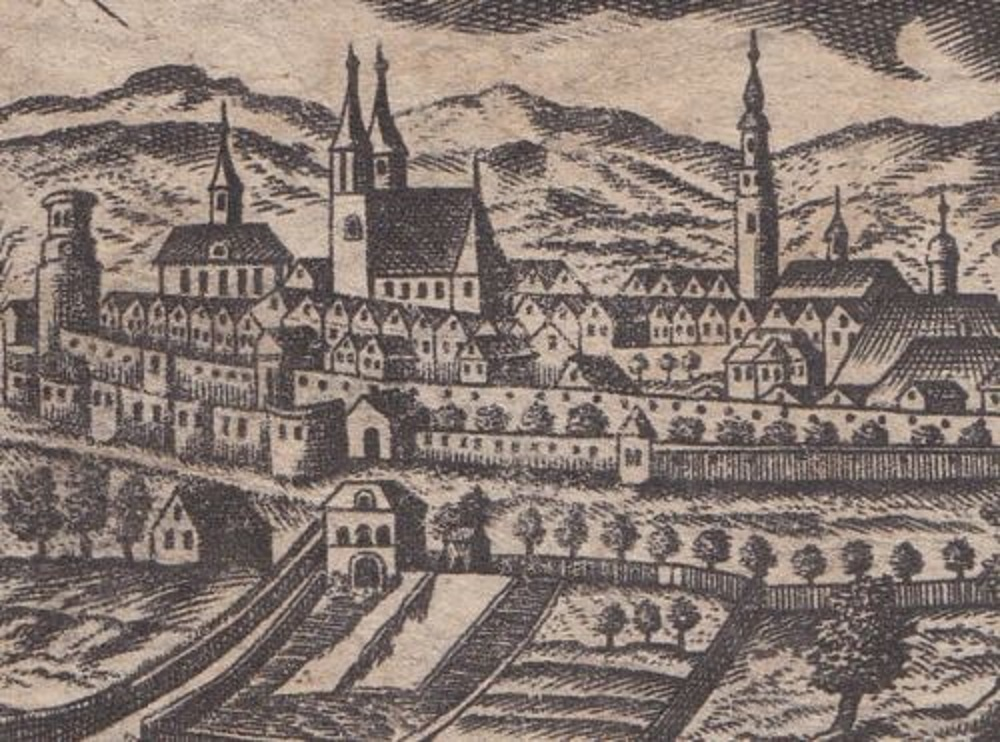
Panorama from 16th century

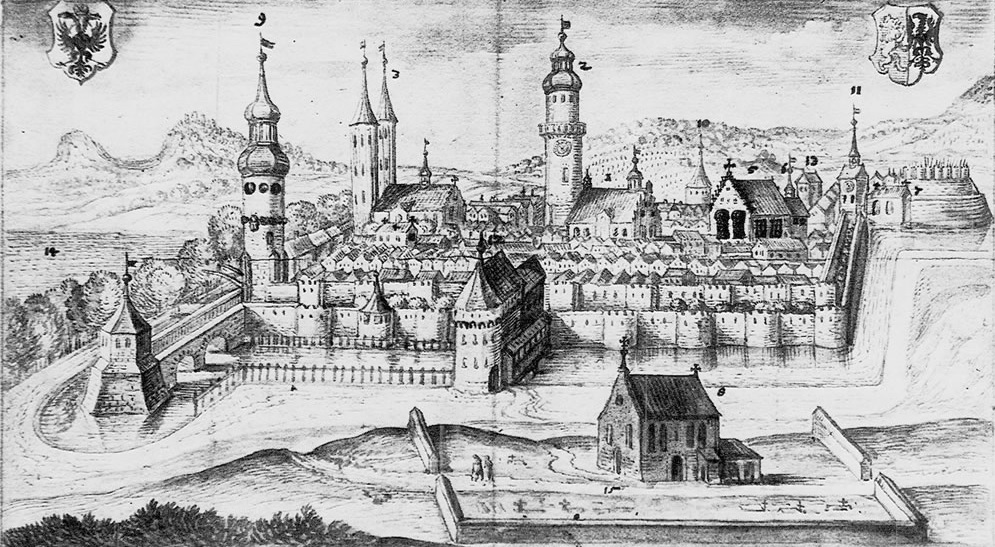
Panorama from 17th century

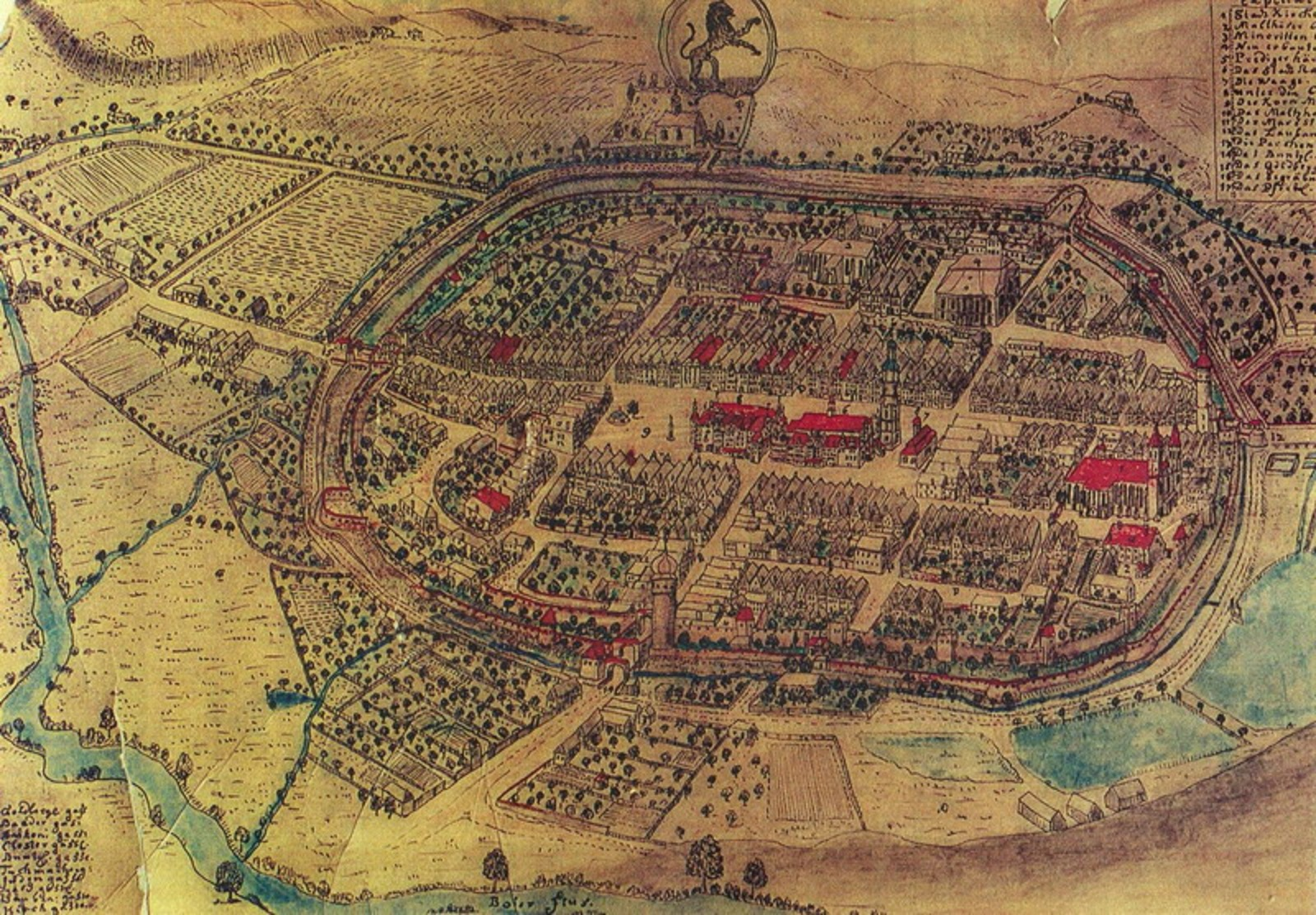
Panorama from 18th century

Löwenberg slowly recovered during its reconstruction, but began to prosper again after its acquisition by the Kingdom of Prussia in 1741 during the Silesian Wars. Troops of the First French Empire occupied the town in May 1813. Polish writer Aleksander Fredro joined the Napoleonic troops in the town. On August 21, 1813, the present-day district of Płakowice was the site of a battle, in which French and Polish troops defeated the Prussians, and Napoleon Bonaparte stayed in the town on August 21–23 while organizing his defenses against the Prussian troops of General Gebhard von Blücher. Following Macdonald's retreat after the Battle of the Katzbach with Blucher, General Puthod's Division, including Vacherau's Brigade (The Irish Regiment, 134th & 143rd Regiments), became isolated from the rest of the army. The Bóbr River had risen out of its banks from the heavy rains and the bridges were underwater. The division had been reduced to six thousand men and twelve pieces of artillery. On the morning of 29 August, they reached the town of Lowenberg. It took up the best position it could find, on the narrow ridge above Płakowice, with its back to the river. All the bridges had been washed away and there was no possibility of constructing a bridge with the river flooding its banks on both sides. A combined Russian and Prussian Army of overwhelming superiority faced the Division but could only attack at the one narrow south-eastern end of the ridge. The battle began at 8:00 am and lasted until after 4:00 pm. When the Division had expended the last of its ammunition, the enemy attacked and overran its position. Most of the officers waded into the river and swam to the opposite shore. The riverbed itself was not terribly wide although the current was strong. They were able to wade about half the distance, swim a short way, and walk through the water to dry land. The total French casualties of killed, wounded, drowned and captured were more the 3,000.

Löwenberg was included within the Province of Silesia after the 1814 Prussian administrative reorganization. Like the rest of the Kingdom of Prussia, the town became part of the German Empire in 1871 during the unification of Germany.

=== 20th century ===
It became part of the Prussian Province of Lower Silesia after World War I. In the interwar period and during World War II there was an economic recession.

In the last days of World War II, the medieval center was 40% destroyed and numerous Gothic, Renaissance, and Baroque buildings were lost. After the German surrender, a time of oppression began for the German populace in their own hometown. More and more Polish arrived who took possession of the town. No Germans were allowed in the streets after dusk. Every Sunday, Germans were forced to public works. However, Germans were also not allowed to move westwards. Finally, on July 1, 1946, the Polish administration announced that all Germans were to be "repatriated" to diminished Germany and had to leave their homes.

The town became part of Poland in accordance with the Potsdam Agreement, first under its historic Polish name Lwów. The town was repopulated by Poles, some of whom were expelled from former eastern Poland annexed by the Soviet Union, while some were settlers from war-devastated central Poland or former prisoners of German Nazi concentration camps and forced labour camps. In 1946, the town was renamed to its other historic, but more modern, name Lwówek Śląski, to distinguish it from Poland's lost city of Lwów.

Following the Korean War, in 1953, Poland admitted 1,000 North Korean orphans in the present-day district of Płakowice, however, some were relocated to Szklarska Poręba and Bardo in the following years. Remaining children returned to North Korea in 1959.

A memorial to Napoleon Bonaparte was unveiled in 2003.

== Coat of arms ==
The coat of arms of Lwówek Śląski is a vertically divided shield depicting the red-white chessboard of the Świdnica Piasts in the sinister field and a right-facing crowned red lion in the dexter field.

== Population ==
Year	1329	1543	1740	1784	1797	1816	1825	1840	1861	1871	1885	1905
Population number	~11,000	4,100	1,495	2,397	3,928	3,684	3,552	3,770	4,628	4,798	4,720	5,682
Year	1920	1941	1945	1950	1960	1970	1978	1988	1999	2000	2006	2016
Population number	6,319	6,063	6,238	3,411	5,517	6,714	7,776	9,312	9,249	10,045	9,687	8,940

- Graph of population of the city of Lwówek Śląski, over the last 2 centuries:

== Climate ==
Climate data for Lwówek Śląski (1979–2013)
Month	Jan	Feb	Mar	Apr	May	Jun	Jul	Aug	Sep	Oct	Nov	Dec	Year
Record high °C (°F)	14.5 (58.1)	16.3 (61.3)	20.4 (68.7)	28.4 (83.1)	30.2 (86.4)	34.2 (93.6)	35.9 (96.6)	35.9 (96.6)	28.5 (83.3)	25.1 (77.2)	17.2 (63.0)	13.3 (55.9)	35.9 (96.6)
Mean daily maximum °C (°F)	1.3 (34.3)	2.7 (36.9)	7.4 (45.3)	13.3 (55.9)	18.7 (65.7)	21.3 (70.3)	23.4 (74.1)	23.3 (73.9)	18.3 (64.9)	13.0 (55.4)	6.3 (43.3)	2.6 (36.7)	12.6 (54.7)
Mean daily minimum °C (°F)	−4.1 (24.6)	−3.6 (25.5)	−0.4 (31.3)	3 (37)	7.4 (45.3)	10.6 (51.1)	12.4 (54.3)	12.0 (53.6)	8.7 (47.7)	4.8 (40.6)	0.8 (33.4)	−2.4 (27.7)	4.1 (39.3)
Record low °C (°F)	−26.3 (−15.3)	−23.9 (−11.0)	−14.6 (5.7)	−6.9 (19.6)	−2.9 (26.8)	1.3 (34.3)	5.1 (41.2)	3.9 (39.0)	−0.1 (31.8)	−6.0 (21.2)	−13.5 (7.7)	−22.9 (−9.2)	−26.3 (−15.3)
Average precipitation mm (inches)	43 (1.7)	36 (1.4)	44 (1.7)	36 (1.4)	53 (2.1)	66 (2.6)	90 (3.5)	75 (3.0)	52 (2.0)	37 (1.5)	44 (1.7)	48 (1.9)	623 (24.5)
Average precipitation days (≥ 1.0 mm)	12	10	11	8	10	12	12	11	10	8	10	12	126
Source: http://eca.knmi.nl/

== Culture and entertainment ==
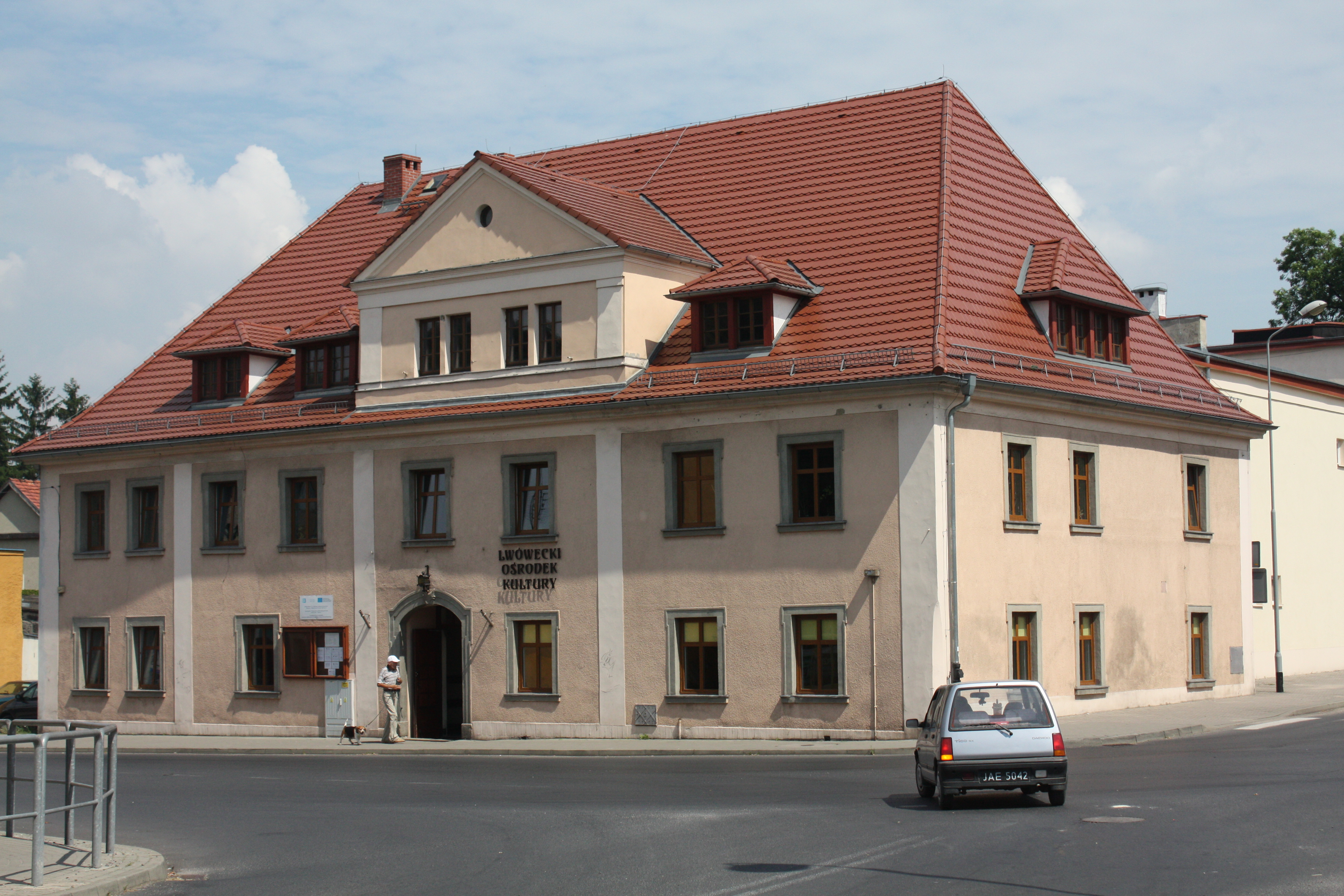
Lwówek's Culture Centre

=== Lwówek's Culture Centre ===
Lwówek's Culture Centre is located in Przyjaciół Żołnierza St. 5. In town's culture centre there are:

- Cinema LOK;
- Office of providers the cable TV;
- Art gallery Kla-Tka;
- Dance School Vega;
- Music room;
- School of painting and drawing.

=== City events ===
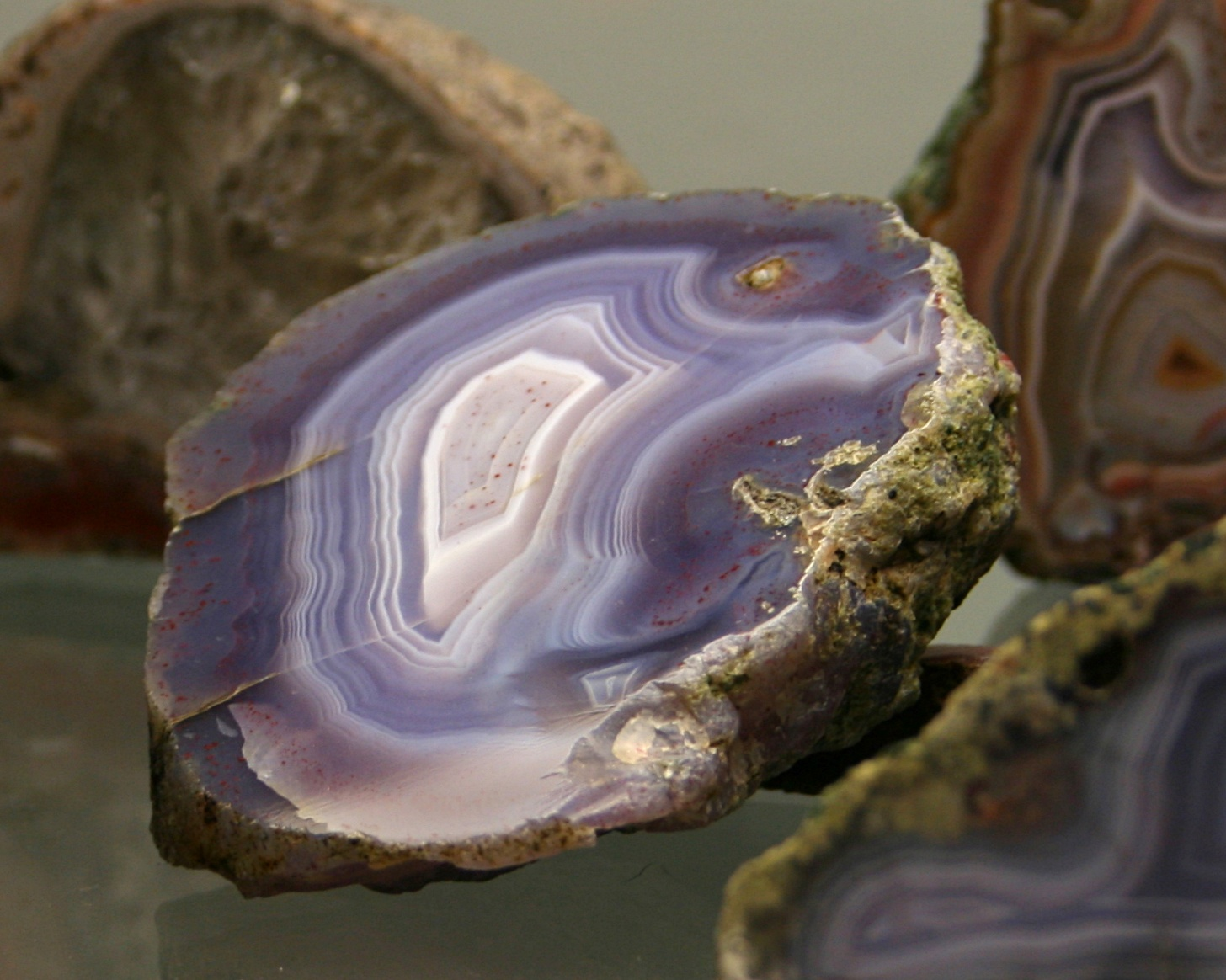
Agate from Płóczki Górne

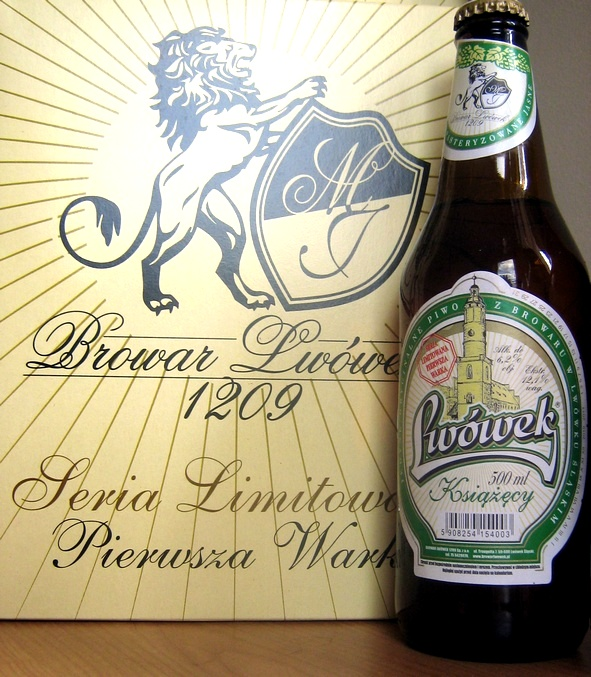
Famous beer from Lwówek Śląski's Brewery - "Lwówek Książęcy"

Every year in the second weekend of July takes place Lwóweckie Lato Agatowe.

- In January – The Kings Parade in the Feast of Three Kings(06.01);
- In March – Lwówek talent fest;
- In April – Nationwide Orientation Fest (III round of Polish Cup);
- In May – International canoeing trip on the Bóbr river;
- In May – Turist rally name Henryk the Bearded;
- In July – Lwówek Agat Summer;
- In July – Lwówek motorcycle jamboree;
- In September – Unusual Heritage Fairs - Napoleonic Picknic, Lower Silesian Festival Of Gifts Of The Forest;
- In October – Lwówek Mineralogical Meeting;
- In December – Christmas Fair, Santa Claus Run, Christmas nativity play.

=== Museums ===
The museums in Lwówek Śląski include:

- Museum - historical facility in the town hall (Wolności Sq. 1);
- Museum of the Brewery in the town brewery "Lwówek" (Traugutta St. 4).

In the second weekend of July, when Lwówek Agat Summer lasts, visitors can access Lubańska Tower for views of the town.

== Notable people ==
- Nikolaus von Reusner (1545–1602), jurist
- Martin Moller (1547–1606), mystic
- Georg Schultze (1599–1634), jurist
- Esaias Reusner (1636–1679), lutist and composer
- Franz Schmidt (1818–1853), preacher, representative in the Frankfurt Parliament in 1848, fled to Switzerland, then to St. Louis, MO, USA; founder of the German Lyceum there.
- Günther Klammt (1898–1971), major-general
- Eberhard Zwirner (1899–1984), physician and phonetician
- Stefan Hüfner (1935–2013), physicist
- Krzysztof Zawadzki (born 1970), actor
- Lucjan Błaszczyk (born 1974), table tennis player
- Anna Rostkowska (born 1980), Polish Olympic athlete

== Twin towns – sister cities ==
See twin towns of Gmina Lwówek Śląski.

== Gallery ==
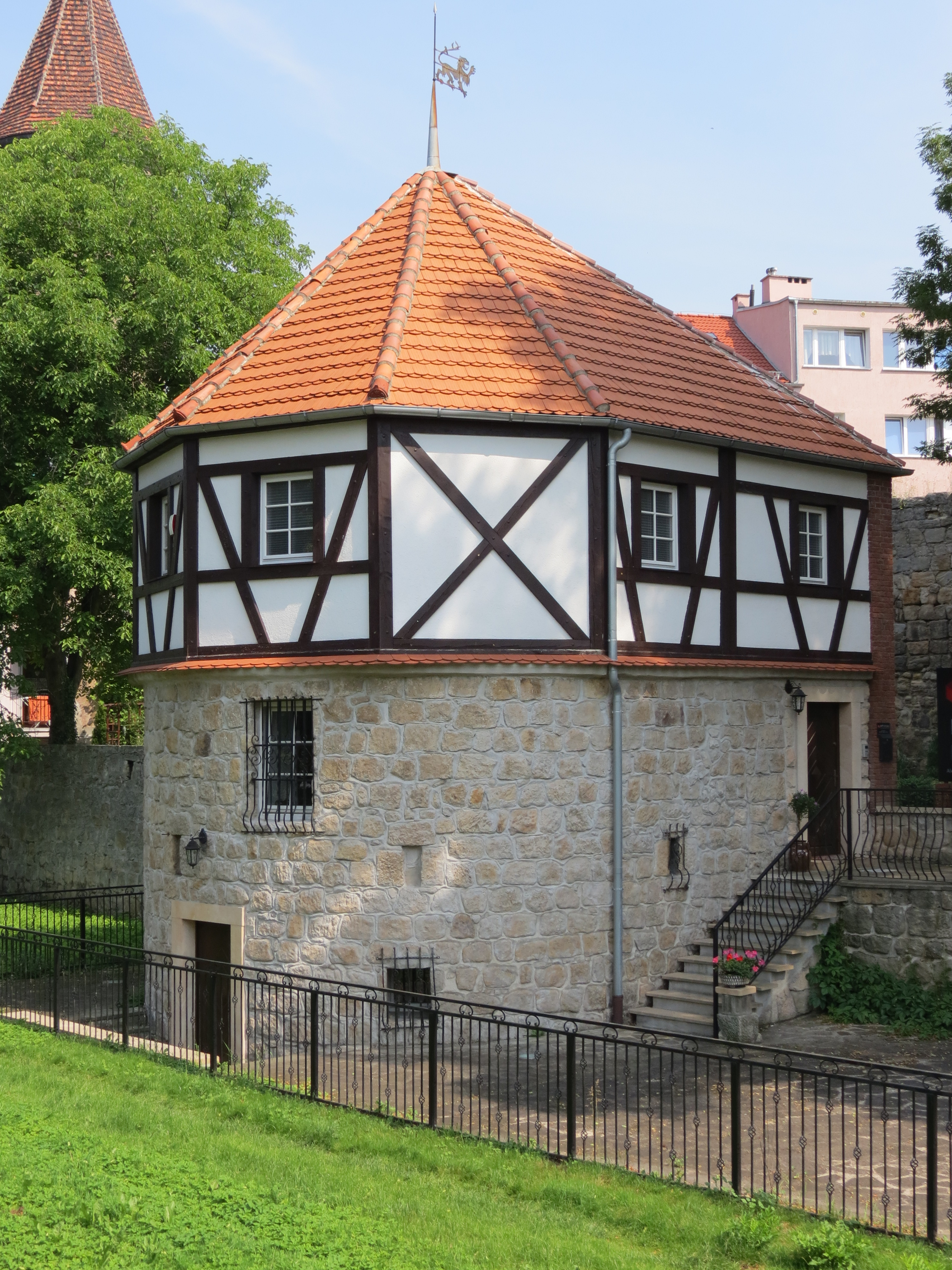
Defensive walls

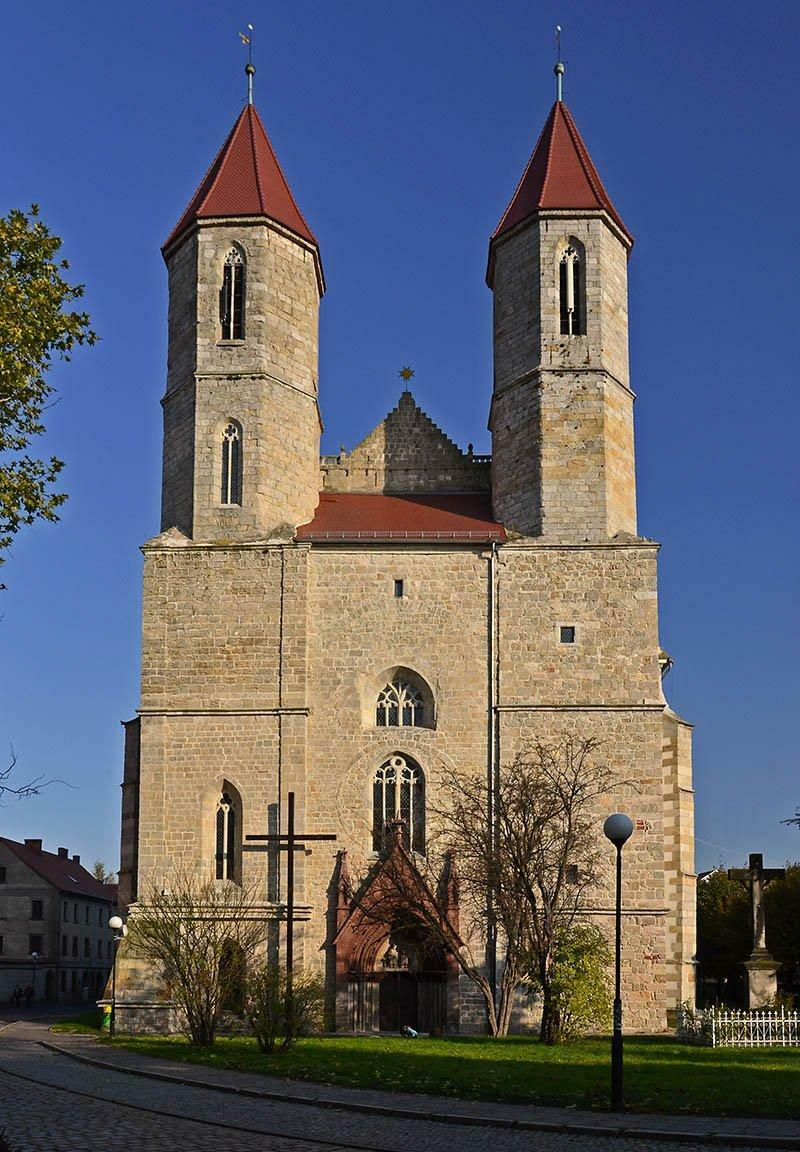
Church of the Blessed Virgin Mary

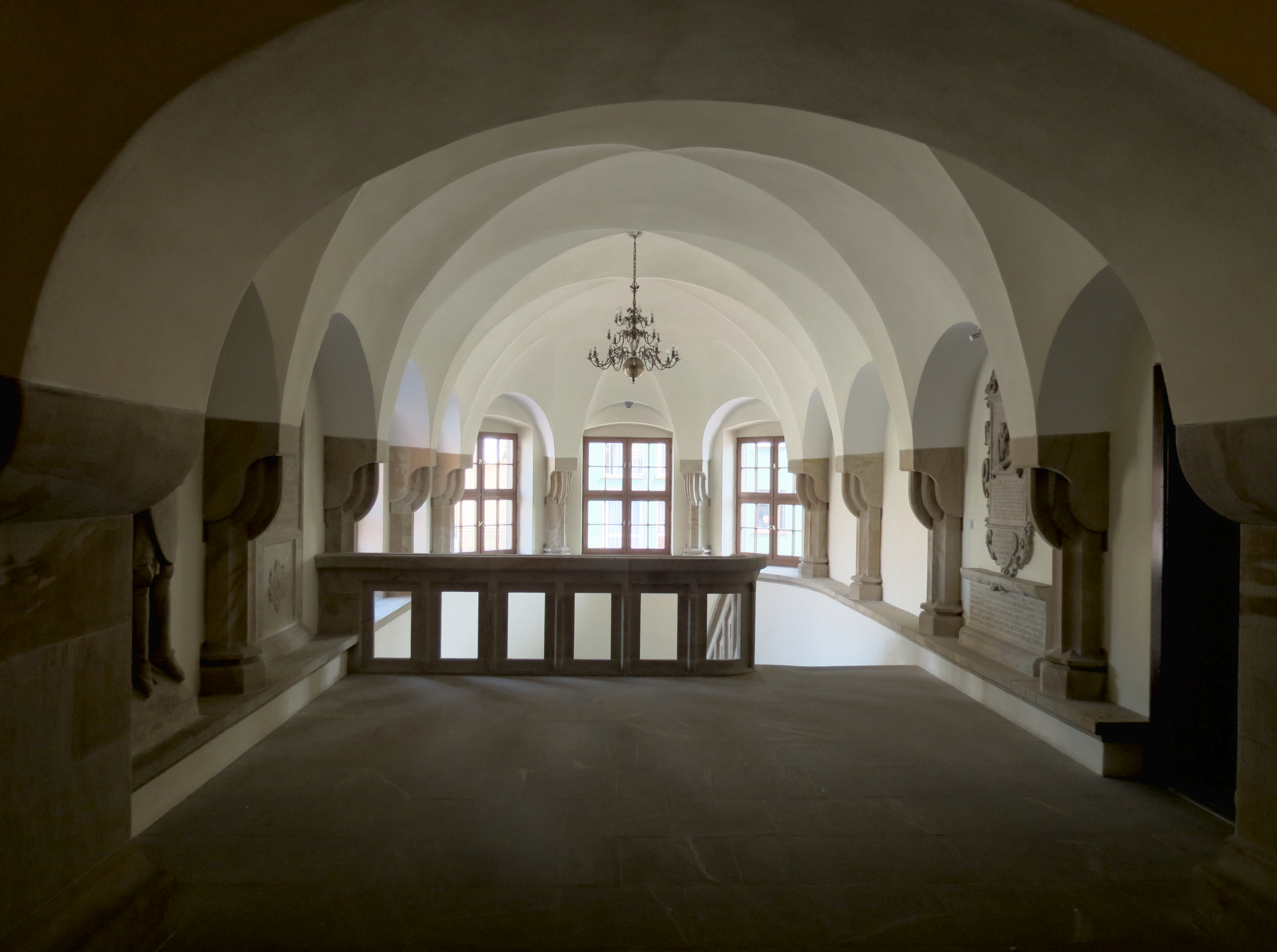
Town hall interior

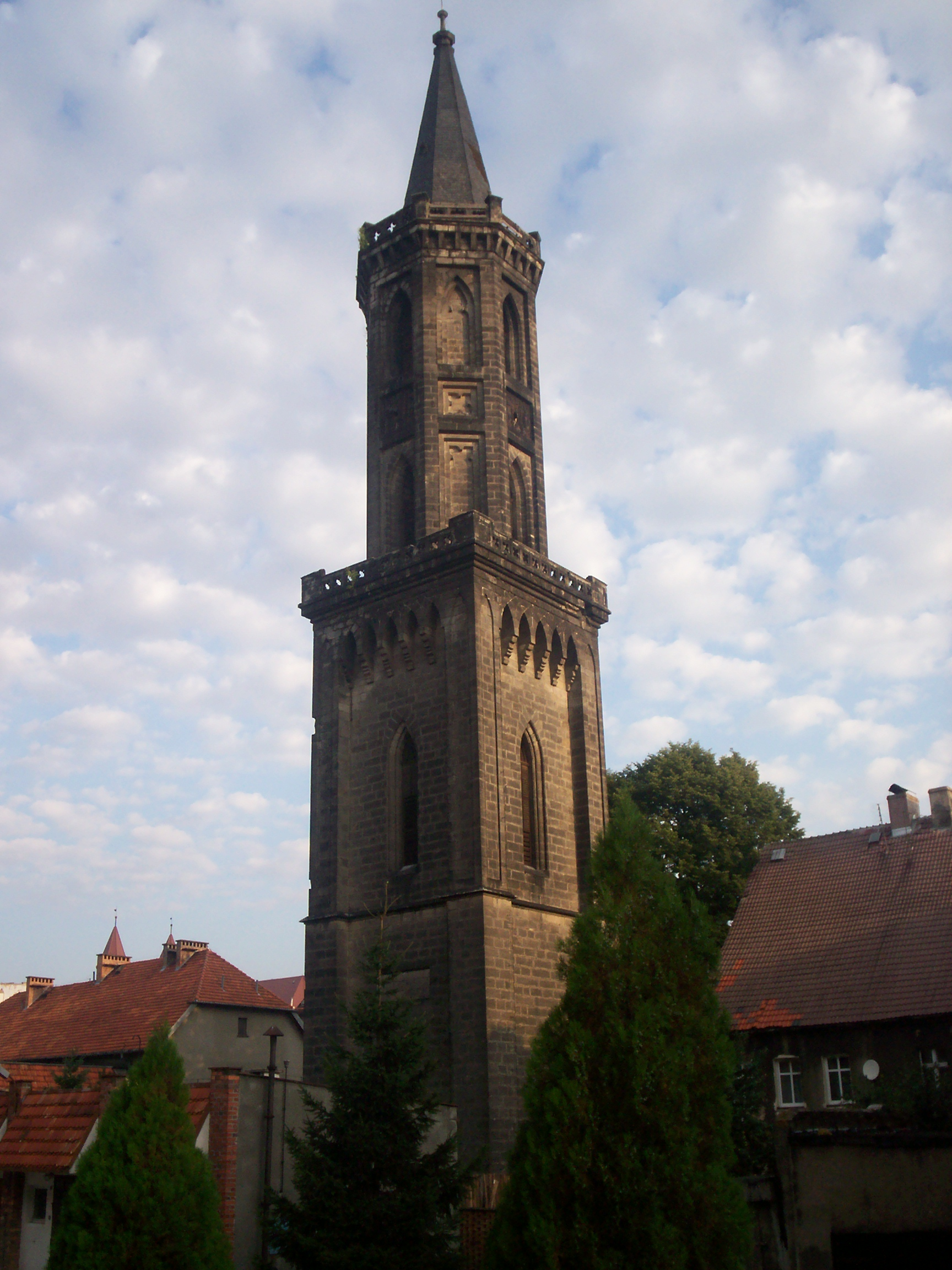
The remaining tower of the Protestant Church

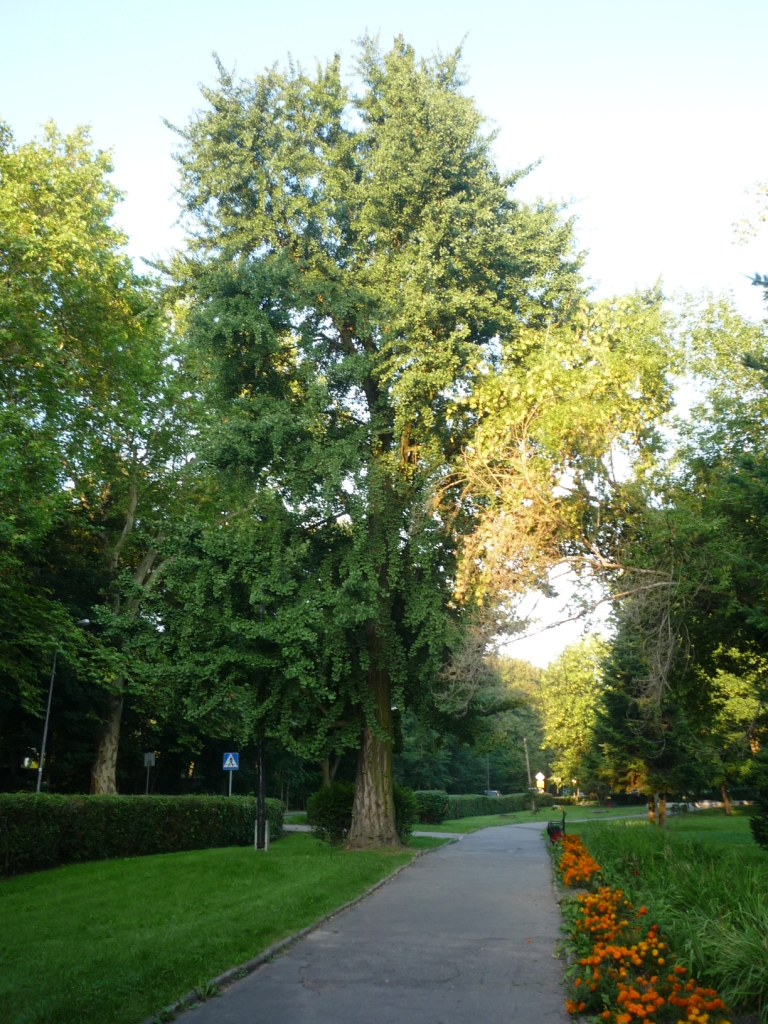
City park

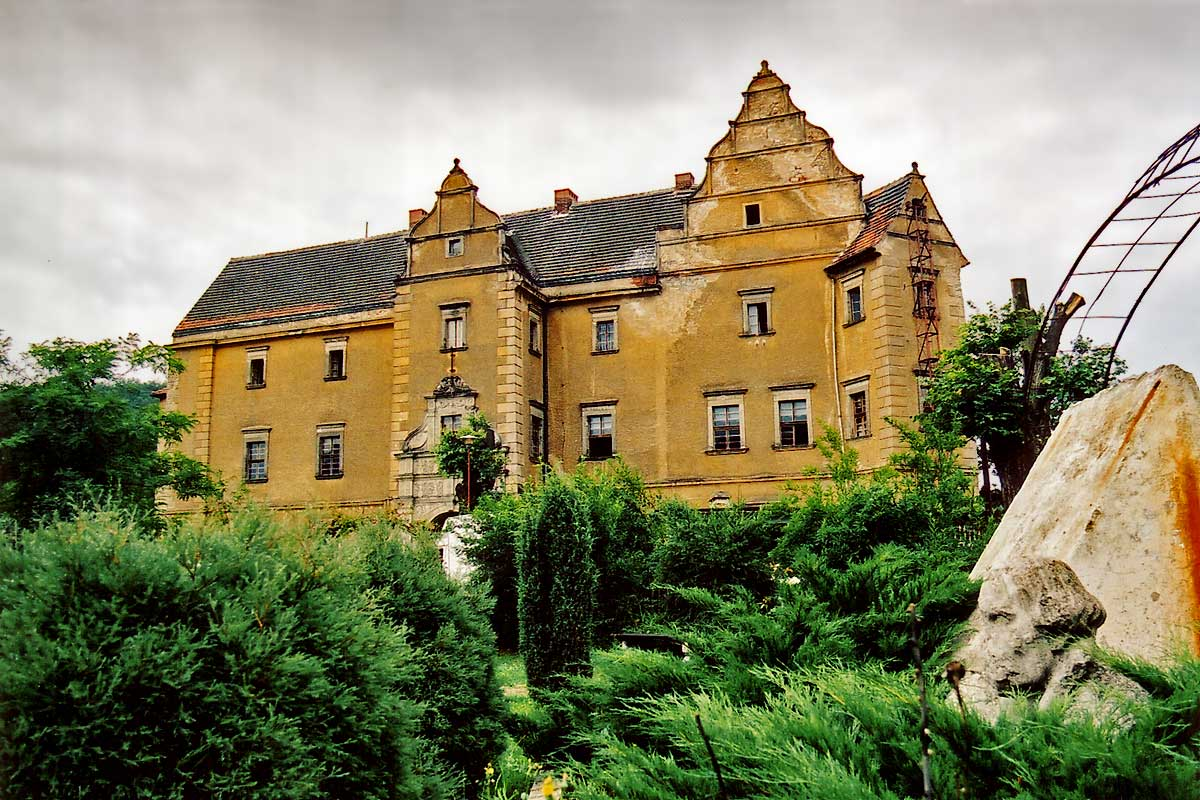
Renaissance Płakowice Castle

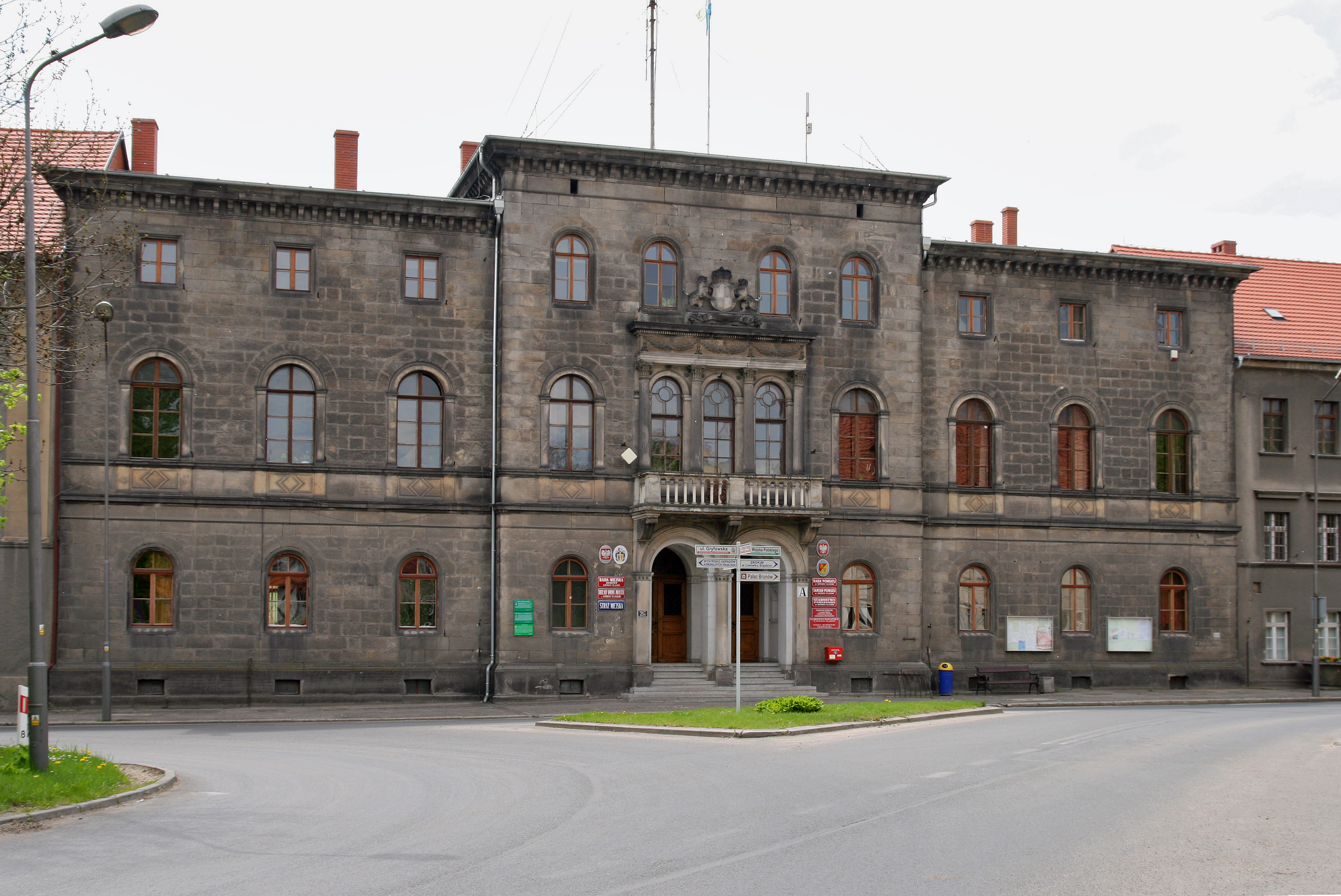
Gmina office
