= Browar Lwówek =

- Interactive map of Browar Lwówek
- Type: Private enterprise
- Location: Traugutta 7, Lwówek Śląski, Lower Silesia, Poland
- Opened: 1209
- Website: www.browarlwowek.pl

Browar Lwówek is the oldest brewery and company in Lwówek Śląski, Lower Silesian Voivodship, Poland. The first written record of its existence is a document from 1209, from an entry in the Wrocław City Book.

Lwówek Śląski was granted town privileges and the right to brew beer in 1209 by Henry I the Bearded. Under the law, the town held a monopoly on the sale of its beer within a radius of one mile, which led to disputes with the noble breweries of other towns.

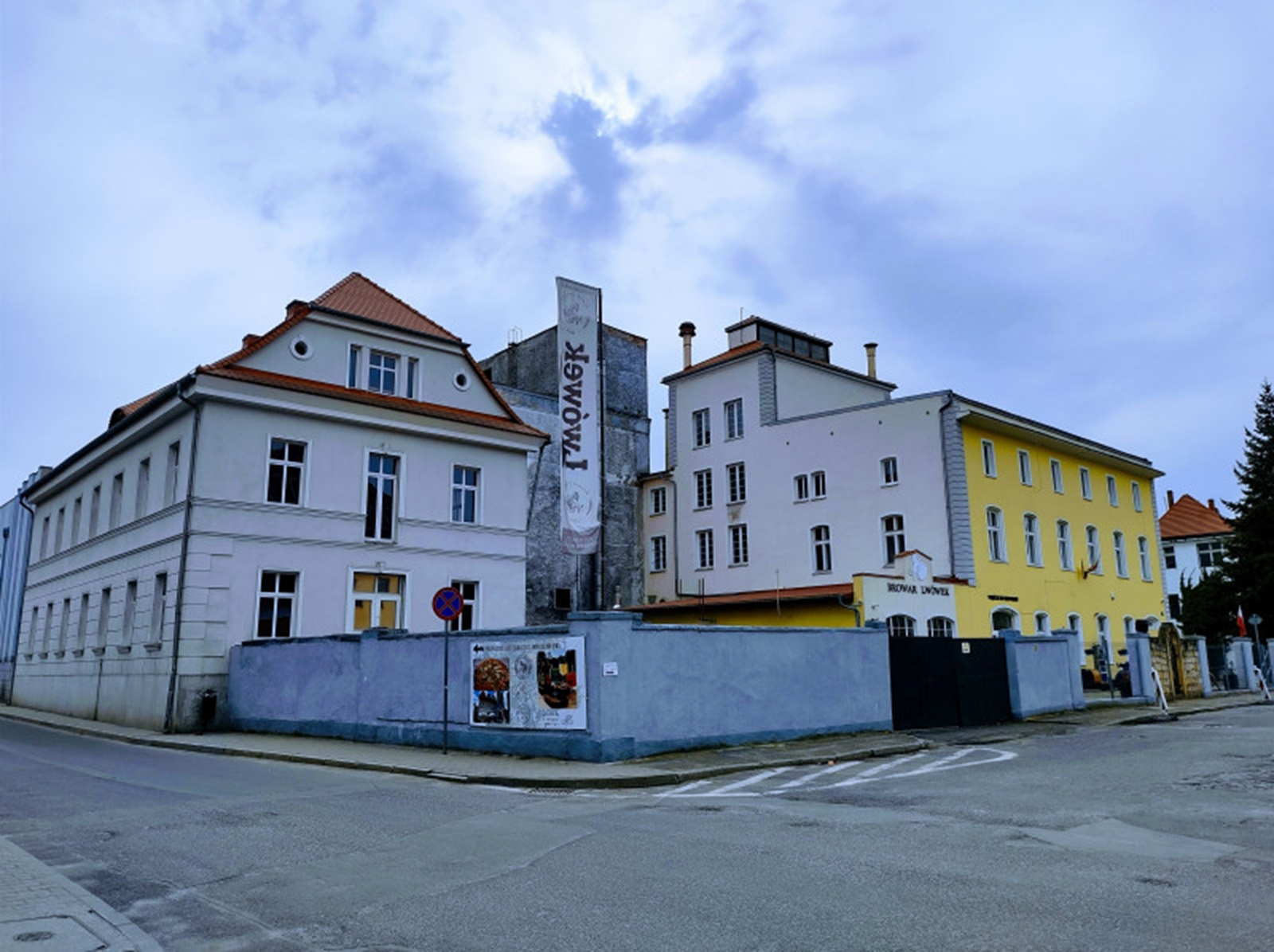
Brewery "Lwówek" in 2024

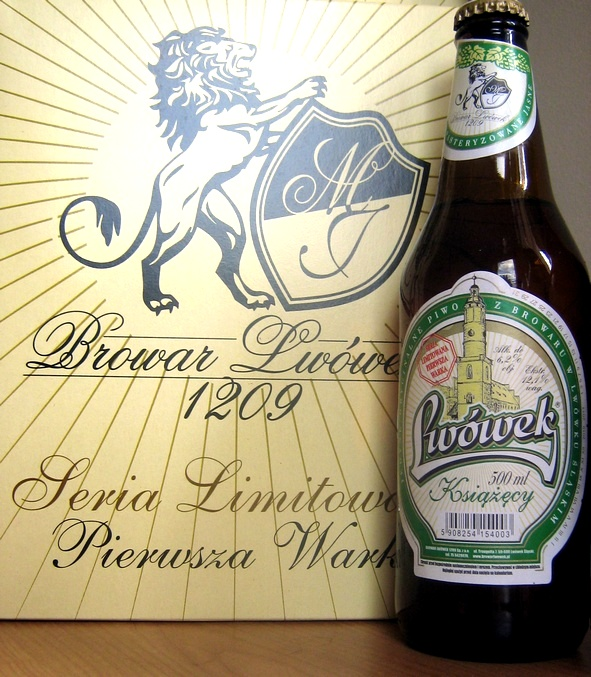
"Lwówek Książęcy"

Beer had been brewed in the same place since the early 13th century. However, during two fires at the castle, the brewery also burned down. The Piasts abandoned the reconstruction and transferred the castle fief to the Town of Lwówek. The town councillors soon decided to rebuild the brewery; the supports of the 15th-century brewing kettle have survived to this day.

The Municipal Brewery operated for around 300 years, though, unfortunately, it was not renowned for the quality of its beers. In 1580 the Evangelical Order of St John, a Protestant knightly order, opened its own brewery here. Legend has it that a monk once drowned in a vat, and the beer brewed on that occasion was exceptionally tasty. Consumers therefore began to demand that the ‘monk brothers’ be added to the beer from then on.

In 1850 the brewery was taken over by the Brewers’ Guild and built on the site of a former castle, that was demolished in 1444. Eleven years later, in 1861, the brewery was sold to Julius Hohberg.

The modern, industrial brewery in Lwówek Śląski was established in the 19th century by Julius Hohberg in 1861. The new owner expanded the business and turned it into one of the largest of its kind in Lower Silesia. After Julius Hohberg's death in 1907, his sons Edwin and Paul became the owners of the brewery. The co-owners continued to expand the plant. Thanks to their efforts, the brewery's area was enlarged, and a new administrative building and a drying room were erected.

In June 2010 a brewing museum was opened at the brewery in Lwówek Śląski, featuring a memorabilia room; visits to the museum are combined with tours of the brewery.

== See also ==
- List of oldest companies
