= Martin Segon =

Serbian writer, Catholic bishop and humanist

- Born: Novo Brdo, Serbian Despotate
- Died: 1482 or 1485
- Citizenship: Serbian, Venetian
- Education: PhD in Law; PhD in Canon law
- Alma mater: University of Padua
- Occupations: Writer, Catholic bishop and humanist (Bishop of Ulcinj)
- Relatives: Jovan de Segonis (parent)
- Writing career
- Subjects: Description of the national customs of the late medieval Balkans; Biographical sketch of Skanderbeg
- Notable works: Martino Segono di Novo Brdo, vescovo di Dulcigno. Un umanista serbo-dalmata del tardo Quattrocento
- Literary movement: Humanism

Martin Segon (Serbian Cyrillic: Мартин Сегон, Latin: Martinus Segonius Nouomotanus, Italian: Martino Segono) was a Serbian writer, Catholic Bishop of Ulcinj, and a notable 15th-century humanist.

== Biography ==
Segon was born in Novo Brdo, in the Serbian Despotate. The name of Segon's father was Jovan de Segonis and he was from Kotor. Segon was a canon in the church of St. Maria in Novo Brdo. He probably moved to Ulcinj when Novo Brdo was captured by the Ottoman Empire in 1455.

He was educated in Padua and wrote his works in Latin language. Segon received a PhD in "both laws" (Doctor of law and Doctor of Canon Law) at the University of Padua in 1475. Segon was a prelate when he died in 1482, or in 1485.

== Works ==
When the Ottoman Empire started to capture more and more European territory, the Popes sent missionaries to the Balkans to spy on the Ottoman forces and their organization of the territories they captured. One of the missionaries was Martin Segon. Pope Sixtus IV instructed Martin Segon to travel across the Balkans and investigate routes which could be used to intercept the Ottomans. He sent the text he wrote to pope Sixtus IV at the beginning of 1480, before Gedik Ahmed Pasha organized the Ottoman invasion of Otranto. Segon's report overcame its main purpose because it included Segon's observations mainly about Serbia (and in less extent other regions) at the end of the 15th century, its history, ethnology, geography, castles, monasteries, Ragusan traders, people and their character, Battle of Kosovo, epic poetry etc. Feliks Petančić used the manuscript written by Martin Segon and published it in 1522 under the title De itineribus in Turciam libellus.

Only one section of his work that was translated in Italian is preserved. That extract was unknown until professor Agostino Petrusi from Milan published it in 1981 within his book titled Martino Segono di Novo Brdo, vescovo di Dulcigno. Un umanista serbo-dalmata del tardo Quattrocento. A part of the text he wrote is short but very important biographical sketch on Skanderbeg (Italian: Narrazioni di Giorgio Castriotto, da i Turchi nella lingua loro chiamato Scander beg, cioe Alesandro Magno).
