= Nicolaus Reusner =

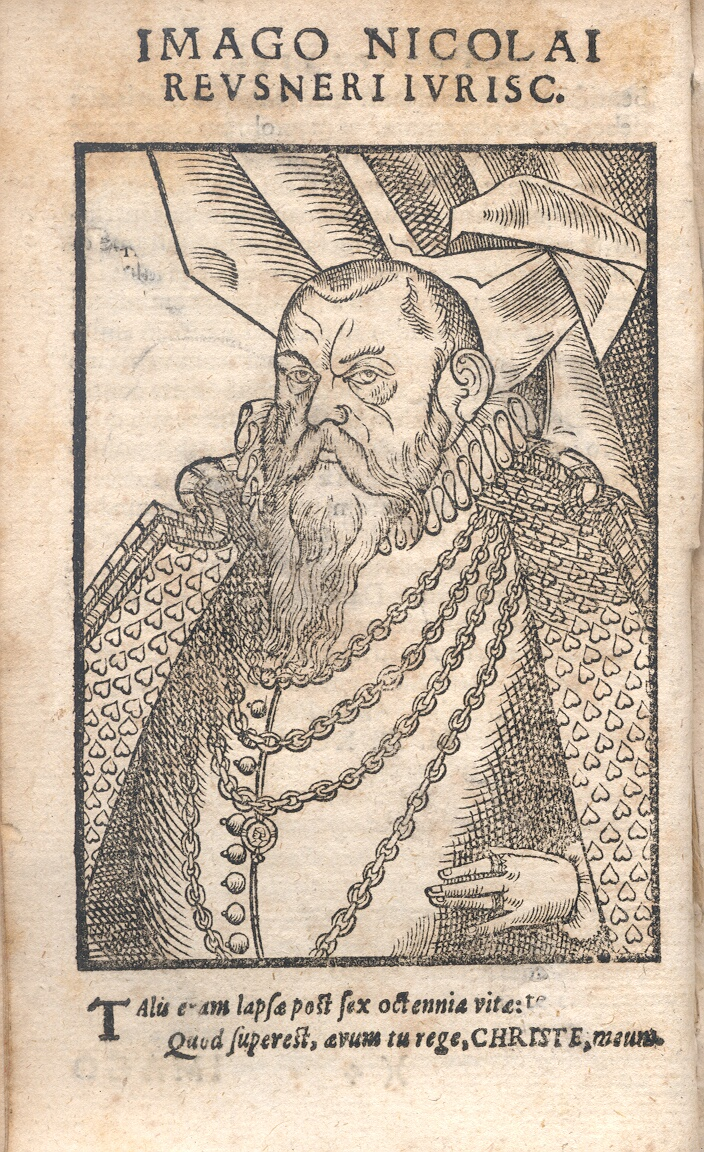
Nicolaus Reusner

Nicolaus Reusner (also von Reusner, Reusnerus; 1545–1602) was a German jurist and publisher. He was born into a family of wealthy German landowners in Löwenberg, Silesia, who had recently moved there from Transylvania. Several members of his family became famous in the fields of law and medicine in the 16th century, including his brothers Bartholomäus von Reusner (1532–1572, medicine), Elias Reusner (1555–1612, history and medicine) and Jeremias von Reusner (law). Reusner studied in Wittenberg and Leipzig, under Modestinus Pistoris, and Leonhard Badehorn. In Leipzig, imperial personal physician Georg Wirth (1524–1613) persuaded him to abandon medicine and study law.

He participated in the Reichstag of 1565 in Augsburg. While he was there, he published the poem Germania ad Caesarem et Electores Imperii, for which he was rewarded by the emperor. From 1566, Reusner worked as a teacher at Lauingen gymnasium, where he was promoted to rector in 1572. In 1571 he married Magdalena Weihemajer (1543–1605) In 1583 he moved to Basel, where he received the title of doctor in jurisprudence. He received a call to the Reichskammergericht on behalf of the Swabian Circle but he preferred an offer from the University of Strasbourg. In 1589, he moved to Jena. In 1594 he was sent on an (unsuccessful) diplomatic mission to Krakau, to petition military support against the Turks on behalf of Mecklenburg. In recognition of his service, emperor Rudolph II awarded him the heritable title of comes Palatinus (which was however extinct upon his death because he had no children).

Reusner is described as a polyhistor of great learning and of gentle character. He authored a total of 83 works on a wide range of topics, including poetry, biography, history, rhetorics, philosophy and natural science besides his proper field of civil and feudal law.

== Works ==
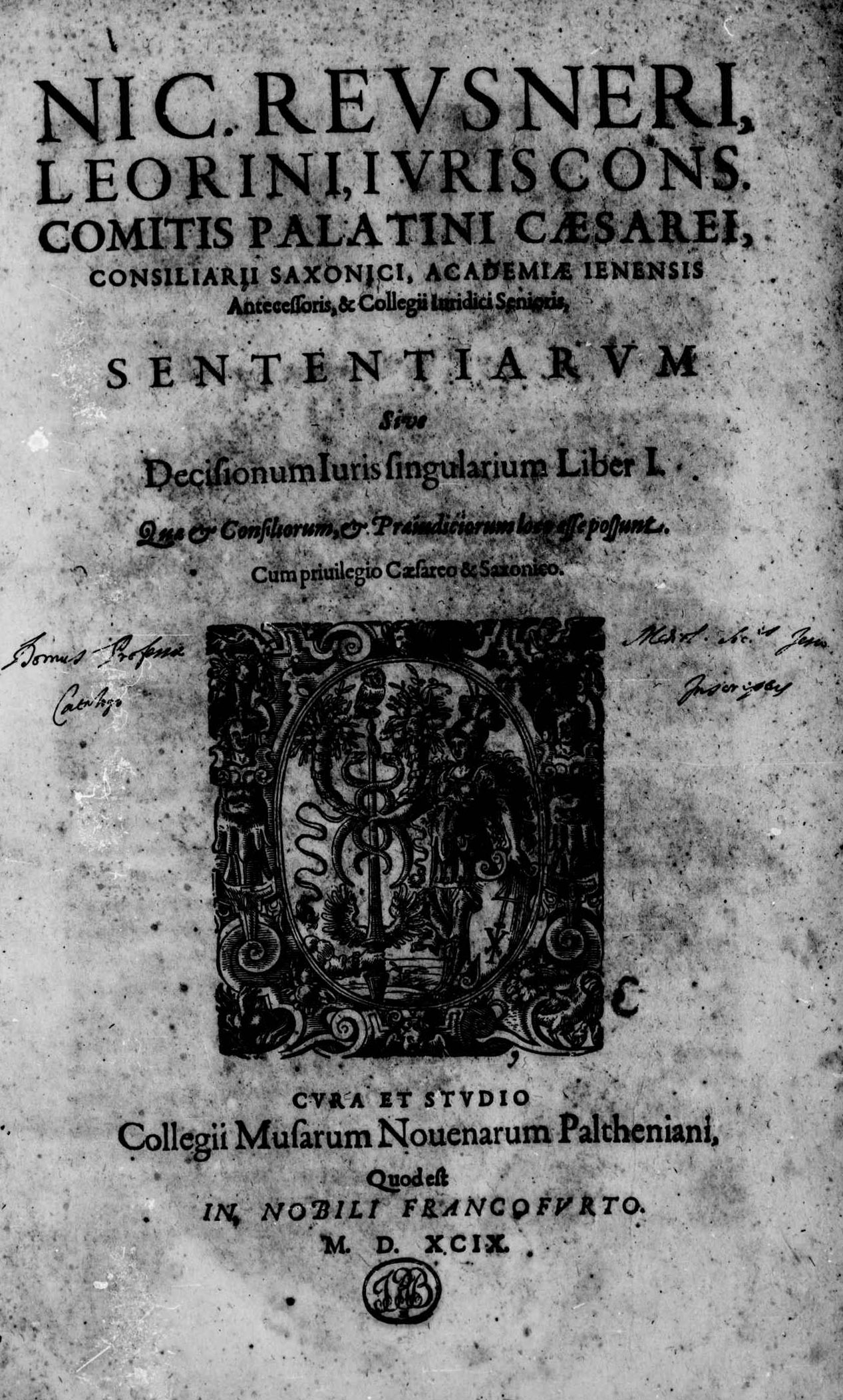
Sententiae sive decisiones iuris singulares, 1599

- Emblematum liber. 1567, woodcuts by Tobias Stimmer, reprinted 1587 etc,
- Elementorum artis rhetoricae, Strasbourg 1571.
- Elementorum artis dialecticae, Lauingen 1571.
- Carmina Sacra, Seu Christias, Lauingen 1571. online facsimile
- Paradisus poeticus. Basel 1578.
- Picta poesis Ovidiana. Frankfurt am Main 1580.
- Oeconomia juris utriusque. Straßburg 1584.
- Ethica philosophica et Christiana. Jena 1590.
- Selectissimarum Orationum et consultationum de bello Turcico, volumina IV. Leipzig 1595. 1596.
- Orationum panegyricarum volumina duo. Jena 1595
- Icones sive Imagines Virorum Literis Illustrium. 1578. Augsburg 1587. (Frankfurt 1719).
- Icones sive imagines vivae, literis Cl. Virorum, Italiae, Greaciae, Germaniae, Galliae, Angliae, Ungariae. Basel 1589. online facsimile
- Icones sive imagines impp. regum, principum, electorum et ducum Saxoniae. Jena 1597.
- Sententiae sive decisiones iuris singulares (in Latin). Vol. 1. Frankfurt am Main: Zacharias Palthenius. 1599.
  - Sententiae sive decisiones iuris singulares (in Latin). Vol. 2. Frankfurt am Main: Zacharias Palthenius. 1600.
  - Sententiae sive decisiones iuris singulares (in Latin). Vol. 3. Frankfurt am Main: Zacharias Palthenius. 1601.
  - Sententiae sive decisiones iuris singulares (in Latin). Vol. 4. Frankfurt am Main: Zacharias Palthenius. 1601.
