= Czecho =

Czecho may refer to:

- Czecho No Republic, a Japanese pop band
- Czecho-Slovakia, an alternate name for Czechoslovakia

== See also ==
- Czech Republic
- Czechoslovakia
- Czech (disambiguation)
- Czechy (disambiguation)
- Čechy (disambiguation)
