= Czechy =

Czechy may refer to:

- Czechy, Gmina Kostomłoty, Środa County, Lower Silesian Voivodeship (south-west Poland)
- Czechy, Świdnica County, Lower Silesian Voivodeship (south-west Poland)
- Czechy, Łódź Voivodeship (central Poland)
- Czechy, Lesser Poland Voivodeship (south Poland)
- Czechy, Greater Poland Voivodeship (west-central Poland)
- Czechy, Pomeranian Voivodeship (north Poland)
- Czechy, West Pomeranian Voivodeship (north-west Poland)

== See also ==
- Čechy (disambiguation)
- Csehi
- Czech (disambiguation)
- Čech (disambiguation)
