= Čechy =

Čechy may refer to:

== Place names ==
Czech Republic

- Čechy, the Czech name for Bohemia
  - Střední Čechy, the Central Bohemian Region
- Čechy (Přerov District), a village and municipality (obec) in Přerov District, Olomouc Region
- Čechy pod Kosířem, a village and municipality (obec) in Prostějov District, Olomouc Region

Slovakia

- Čechy (Komáromcsehi), a village and municipality in the Nové Zámky District, Nitra Region, Slovakia

== Other ==
- 21257 Jižní Čechy, a main belt asteroid

== See also ==
- Lech, Czech and Rus
- Czechy (disambiguation)
- Csehi, a village in Hungary
- Čech (disambiguation)
- Czech (disambiguation)
