= Młyńsko =

Młyńsko may refer to the following:

- Młyńsko, Lower Silesian Voivodeship (south-west Poland)
- Młyńsko, Pomeranian Voivodeship (north Poland)
- Młyńsko railway station (Lower Silesian Voivodeship)
