= Ubocze =

Ubocze may refer to the following places in Poland:

- Ubocze, Lower Silesian Voivodeship (south-west Poland)
- Ubocze, West Pomeranian Voivodeship (north-west Poland)
- Ubocze railway station, Lower Silesian Voivodeship
