= Marek Čech =

Marek Čech may refer to:

- Marek Čech (Slovak footballer) (born 1983), retired Slovak footballer
- Marek Čech (Czech footballer) (born 1976), Czech international football goalkeeper

== See also ==
- Čech (surname)
