= Cech =

Cech may refer to:

- Čech/Cech, a surname
- Čech (disambiguation)
- CECH, acronym for University of Cincinnati College of Education Criminal Justice and Human Services
- CECh, the Catholic Episcopal Conference of Chile
