= Csehipuszta =

Csehipuszta (Csehi-Puszta, meaning "Czech Puszta") may refer to:

- Csehipuszta (Iregszemcse), nearby Iregszemcse
- Hungarian name of Șimleu Silvaniei, Sălaj County
