= Glasenapp =

Glasenapp may refer to:

- German name of Godzisław, West Pomeranian Voivodeship
- Glasenapp family, German noble family from Pomerania
  - Caspar Otto von Glasenapp (1664–1747), military officer and general of the Prussian Army
  - Helmuth von Glasenapp (1891–1963), German scholar and professor
  - Otto Georg Bogislaf von Glasenapp (1853–1928), German banker of the Reichsbank

== See also ==
- Glazenap
