= CEH =

CEH, or Ceh may refer to:

- Certified Ethical Hacker, a professional certification
- Centre for Ecology and Hydrology
- Historical Clarification Commission, Spanish: Comisión para el Esclarecimiento Histórico
- Coast Entertainment, ASX ticker code
- Coleshill Parkway railway station (England), National Rail station code "CEH"
- Clyde Edwards-Helaire (born 1999), American football player
- Cystic endometrial hyperplasia, a condition in animals that can cause pyometra
- Čeh, a Slovene surname
- Czech Republic, UNDP country code
