= Mieszałki =

- Village
- Location within Poland
- Coordinates: 53°53′N 16°25′E
- Country: Poland
- Voivodeship: West Pomeranian
- County: Szczecinek
- Gmina: Grzmiąca

Mieszałki [mjɛˈʂau̯ki] (formerly German Grünewald) is a village in the administrative district of Gmina Grzmiąca, within Szczecinek County, West Pomeranian Voivodeship, in north-western Poland. It lies approximately 6 km (4 mi) north of Grzmiąca, 26 km (16 mi) north-west of Szczecinek, and 132 km (82 mi) north-east of the regional capital Szczecin.

For the history of the region, see History of Pomerania.
