= Storkowo, Szczecinek County =

Storkowo
- Village
- Location within Poland
- Coordinates: 53°48′N 16°28′E
- Country: Poland
- Voivodeship: West Pomeranian
- County: Szczecinek
- Gmina: Grzmiąca
- Population: 150

Storkowo [stɔrˈkɔvɔ] (formerly German Storkow) is a village in the administrative district of Gmina Grzmiąca, within Szczecinek County, West Pomeranian Voivodeship, in north-western Poland. It lies approximately 6 km (4 mi) south-east of Grzmiąca, 17 km (11 mi) north-west of Szczecinek, and 132 km (82 mi) east of the regional capital Szczecin.

For the history of the region, see History of Pomerania.

The village has a population of 150.
