= Boleszkowice =

Boleszkowice refers to the following places in Poland:

- Boleszkowice, Myślibórz County
- Boleszkowice, Szczecinek County
- Gmina Boleszkowice, gmina (administrative district) in Myślibórz County
