= Przeradz, West Pomeranian Voivodeship =

Przeradz
- Village
- Location within Poland
- Coordinates: 53°46′N 16°33′E
- Country: Poland
- Voivodeship: West Pomeranian
- County: Szczecinek
- Gmina: Grzmiąca

Przeradz [ˈpʂɛrat͡s] (German: Eschenriege) is a village in the administrative district of Gmina Grzmiąca, within Szczecinek County, West Pomeranian Voivodeship, in north-western Poland. It lies approximately 13 km (8 mi) south-east of Grzmiąca, 11 km (7 mi) north-west of Szczecinek, and 136 km (85 mi) east of the regional capital Szczecin.

For the history of the region, see History of Pomerania.
