= Slovak Republic (disambiguation) =

Following states have had Slovak Republic in their name:

- Slovakia, a current state that became an independent country by the dissolution of Czechoslovakia in 1993, sometimes also called the Second Slovak Republic
- Slovak Socialist Republic, a federal republic within Czechoslovakia from 1969 (losing the "Socialist" from the name in 1990)
- Slovak Republic (1939–1945), Germany's puppet ally during (and shortly before) World War II, also called the First Slovak Republic or the Slovak state
- Slovak Soviet Republic, a short-lived communist state in south and eastern Slovakia in summer 1919

== See also ==
- Slovak (disambiguation)
- Czechoslovak (disambiguation)
- Czechoslovakia, former state
