= Čech =

Čech (feminine: Čechová) is a Czech surname meaning 'inhabitant of Bohemia', 'Czech'. The surname was given to the Czech (Bohemian) people abroad, in Moravia and in the German-speaking regions of Bohemia. The surname could also have originated as an abbreviation of the given name Čechoslav. The German-language counterpart of the name is Böhm. Notable people with the surname include:

- Dana Čechová (born 1983), Czech table tennis player
- Donovan Cech (born 1974), South African rower
- Eduard Čech (1893–1960), Czech mathematician
- Filip Čech (born 1980), Czech ice hockey player
- František Čech (born 1998), Czech footballer
- František Ringo Čech (born 1943), Czech musician and politician
- Heda Čechová (1928–2020), Czech television anchorwoman, radio presenter and politician
- Karel Čech (1844–1913), Czech opera singer
- Kateřina Čechová (born 1988), Czech athlete
- Marek Čech (Czech footballer) (born 1976), Czech footballer
- Marek Čech (Slovak footballer) (born 1983), Slovak footballer
- Martin Čech (1976–2007), Czech ice hockey player
- Miya Cech (born 2004), American actress
- Olga Čechová (1925–2010), Czech printmaker
- Petr Čech (born 1982), Czech footballer
- Petr Čech (hurdler) (1944–2022), Czech hurdler
- Soňa Čechová (1930–2007), Slovak translator
- Svatopluk Čech (1846–1908), Czech writer, journalist and poet
- Thomas Cech (born 1947), American chemist
- Vladimír Čech (1951–2013), Czech actor, presenter and politician

== See also ==
- Čeh, South Slavic variant
- Chekh, East Slavic variant
- Cseh, Hungarian variant
- Czech (surname), Polish variant
