= Czechoslovak =

Czechoslovak may refer to:

- A demonym or adjective pertaining to Czechoslovakia (1918–93)
  - First Czechoslovak Republic (1918–38)
  - Second Czechoslovak Republic (1938–39)
  - Third Czechoslovak Republic (1945–48)
  - Fourth Czechoslovak Republic (1948–89); Czechoslovak Republic (1948-1960), Czechoslovak Socialist Republic (1960-1989)
  - Czech and Slovak Federative Republic (1990–93)
- Czechoslovak, also Czecho-Slovak, any grouping of the Czech and Slovak ethnicities:
  - As a national identity, see Czechoslovakism
  - The title of Symphony no. 8 in G Major op. 88 by Antonín Dvořák in 1889/90
- The Czech–Slovak languages, a West Slavic dialect continuum
  - The Czechoslovak language, a theoretical standardized form defined as the state language of Czechoslovakia in its Constitution of 1920
  - Comparison of Czech and Slovak

== See also ==
- Slovak Republic (disambiguation)
- Czech Republic (disambiguation)
- Czechia (disambiguation)
- Slovak (disambiguation)
- Czech (disambiguation)
