= Czech Republic (disambiguation) =

The Czech Republic is a nation state in Europe.

Czech Republic may also refer to:

- Czech Republic (European Parliament constituency)
- Czech Socialist Republic, constituent part of Czechoslovakia in 1969–1990, named Czech Republic in 1990–1992

== See also ==
- Czechia (disambiguation)
- Czech (disambiguation)
- Czechoslovak (disambiguation)
- Czecho No Republic, Japanese band named after the country
