= Krzewie Wielkie =

- Village
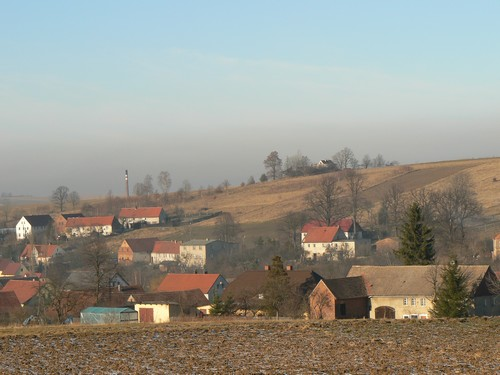

- Location within Poland
- Coordinates: 51°2′N 15°26′E
- Country: Poland
- Voivodeship: Lower Silesian
- County: Lwówek
- Gmina: Gryfów Śląski
- Website: http://www.krzewie.go.pl

Krzewie Wielkie [ˈkʂɛvjɛ ˈvjɛlkʲɛ] is a village in the administrative district of Gmina Gryfów Śląski, within Lwówek County, Lower Silesian Voivodeship, in south-western Poland.
