= Czech =

Czech may refer to:

- Anything from or related to the Czech Republic, a country in Europe
  - Czech language
  - Czechs, the people of the area
  - Czech culture
  - Czech cuisine
- One of three mythical brothers, Lech, Czech, and Rus
- Czech (surname)
- Czech, Łódź Voivodeship, Poland

== See also ==
- Čech (disambiguation)
- Čech, a surname
- Czech lands
- Check (disambiguation)
- Czechoslovak (disambiguation)
- Czech Republic (disambiguation)
- Czechia (disambiguation)
