= Proszówka =

- Village
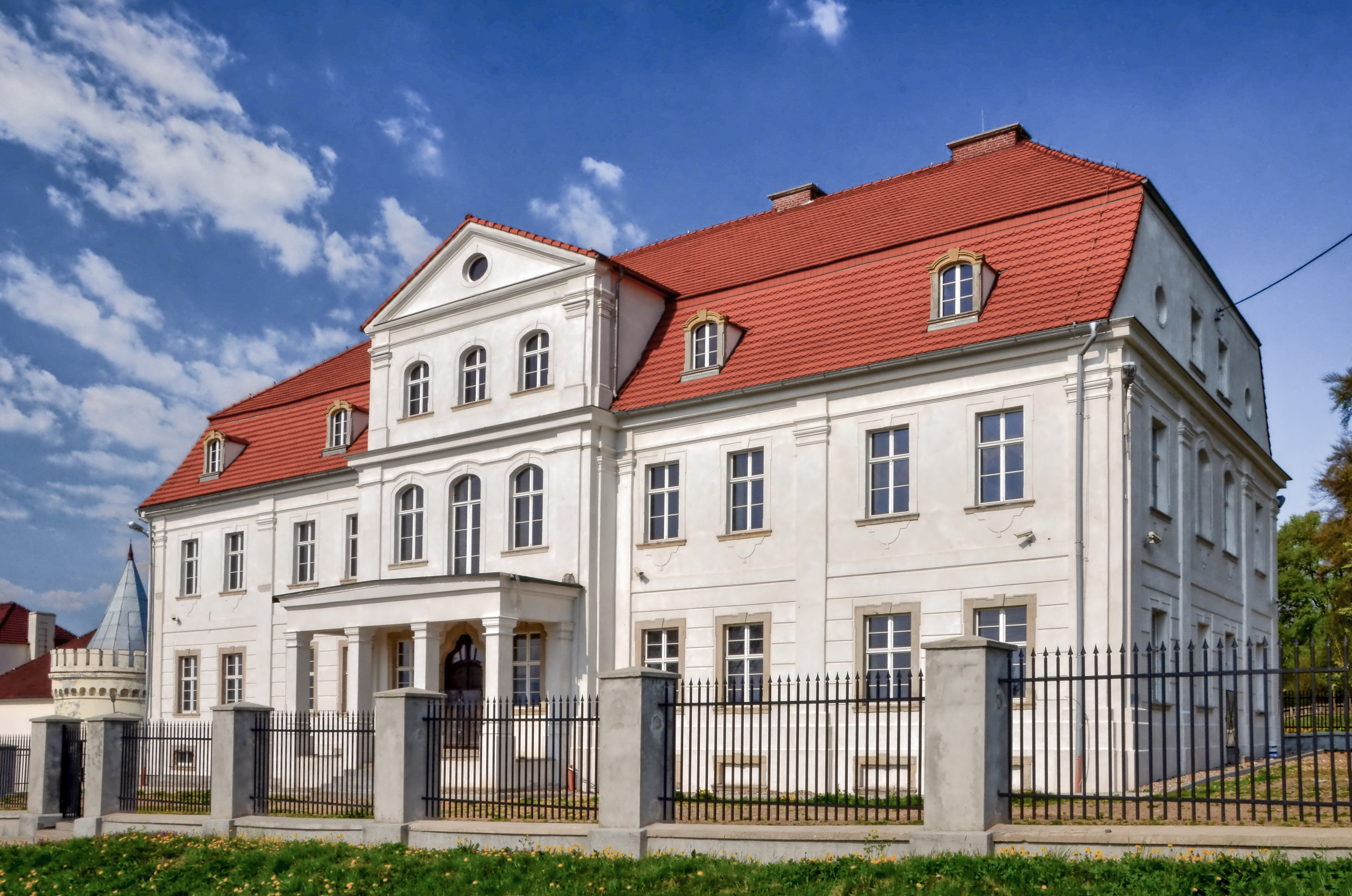
- Palace in Proszówka

- Location within Poland
- Coordinates: 51°00′28″N 15°25′30″E
- Country: Poland
- Voivodeship: Lower Silesian
- County: Lwówek
- Gmina: Gryfów Śląski
- Time zone: UTC+1 (CET)
  - Summer (DST): UTC+2 (CEST)

Proszówka [prɔˈʂufka] is a village in the administrative district of Gmina Gryfów Śląski, within Lwówek County, Lower Silesian Voivodeship, in south-western Poland.

The most prominent landmark of Proszówka is the Gryf Castle, a medieval stronghold of local Polish dukes of the Piast dynasty. Other landmarks are the 17th-century Baroque chapel of St. Leopold and the 18th-century palace complex.

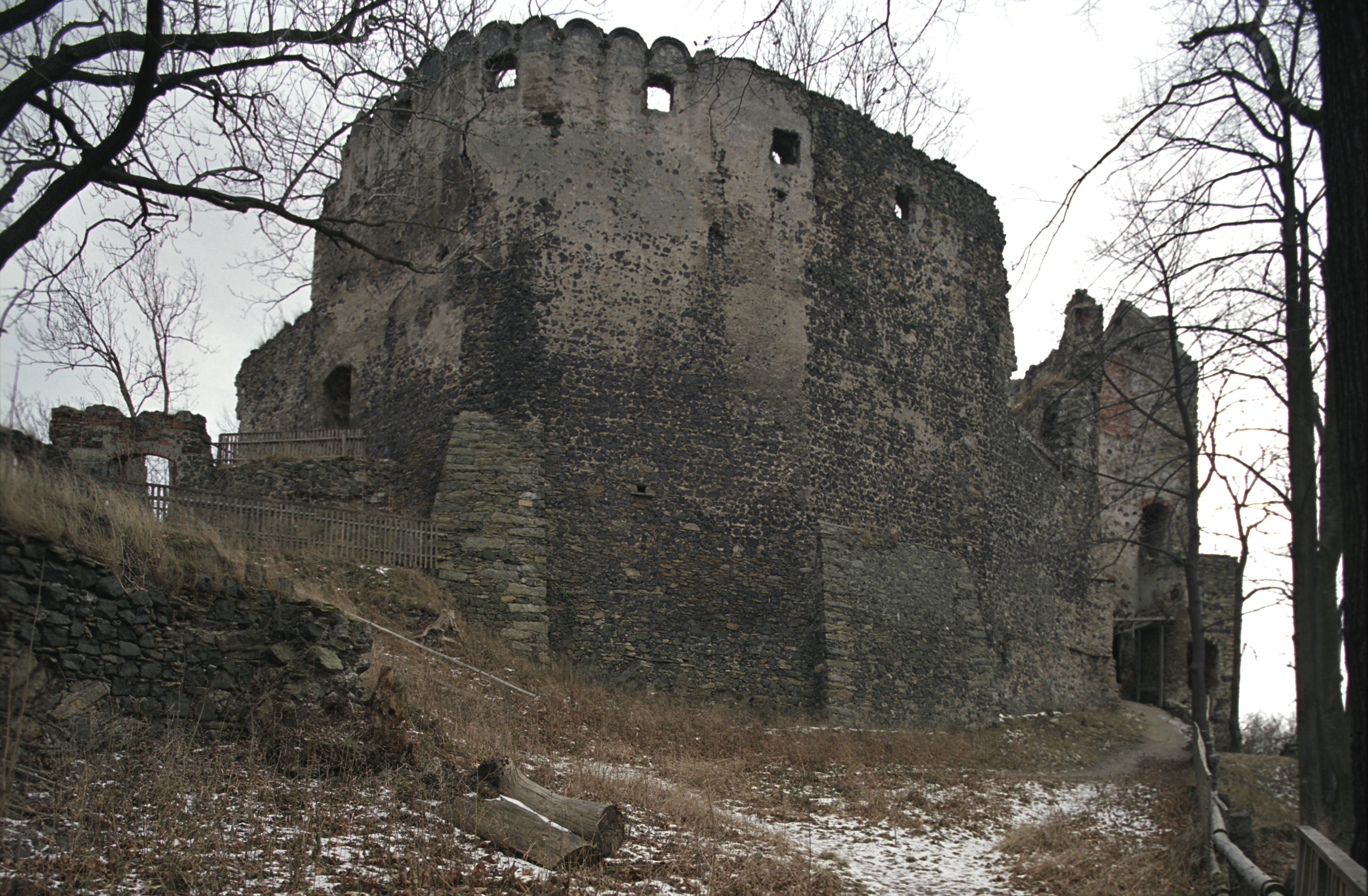
Gryf Castle

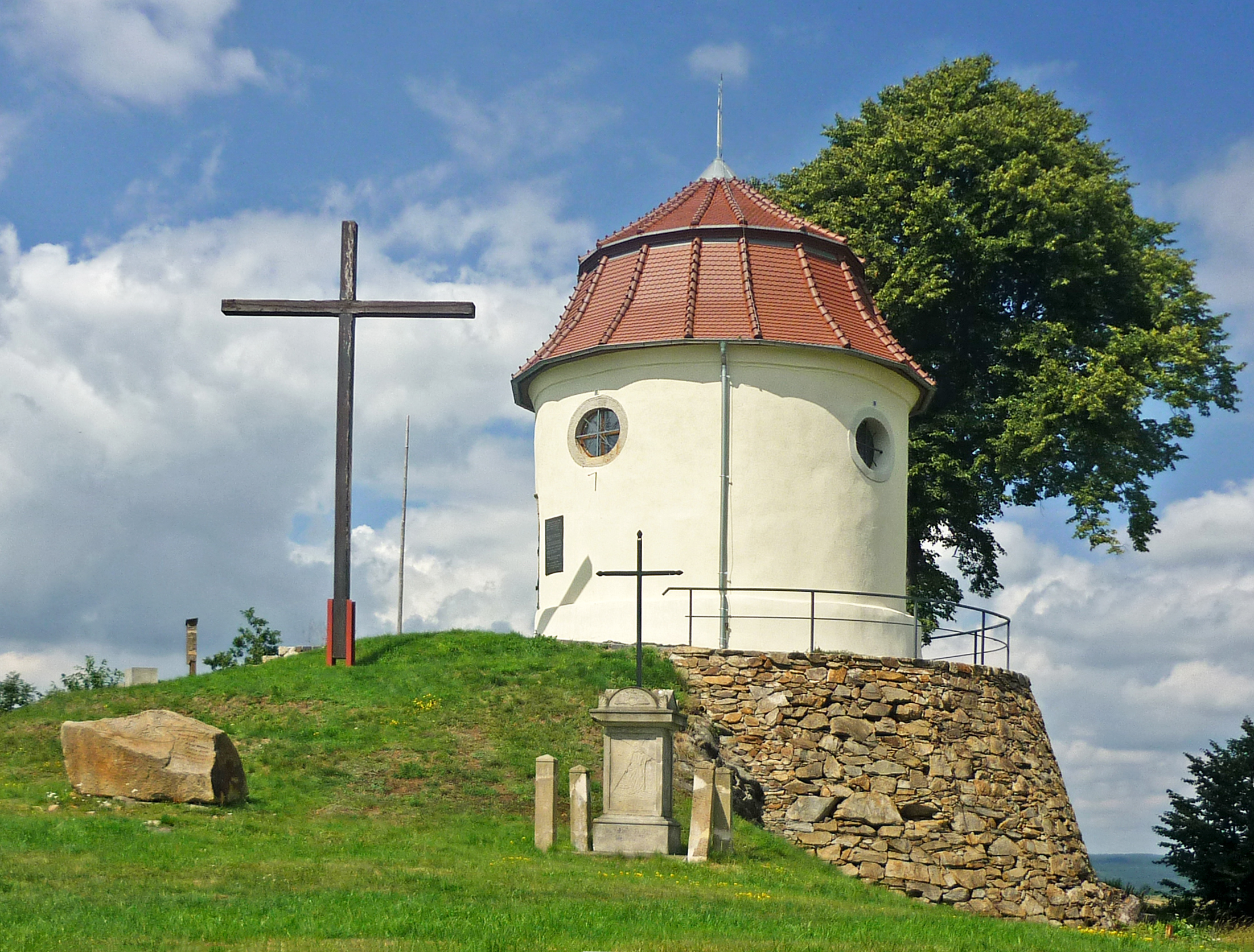
St. Leopold chapel

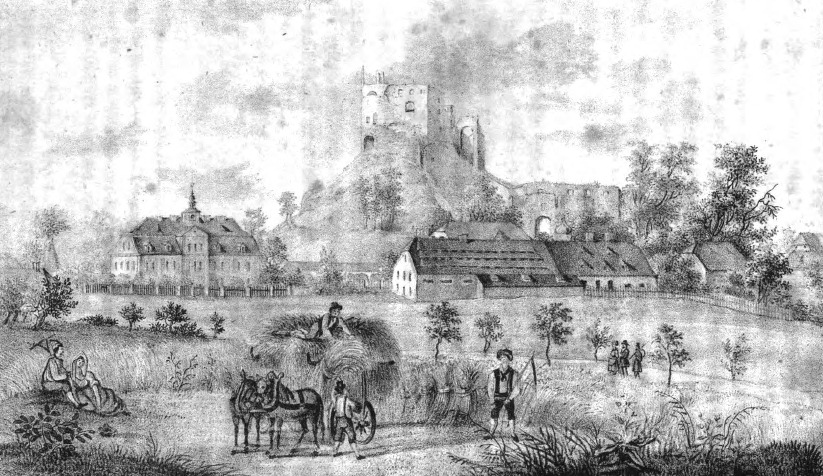
19th-century view of the village
