= Wolbromów =

- Village
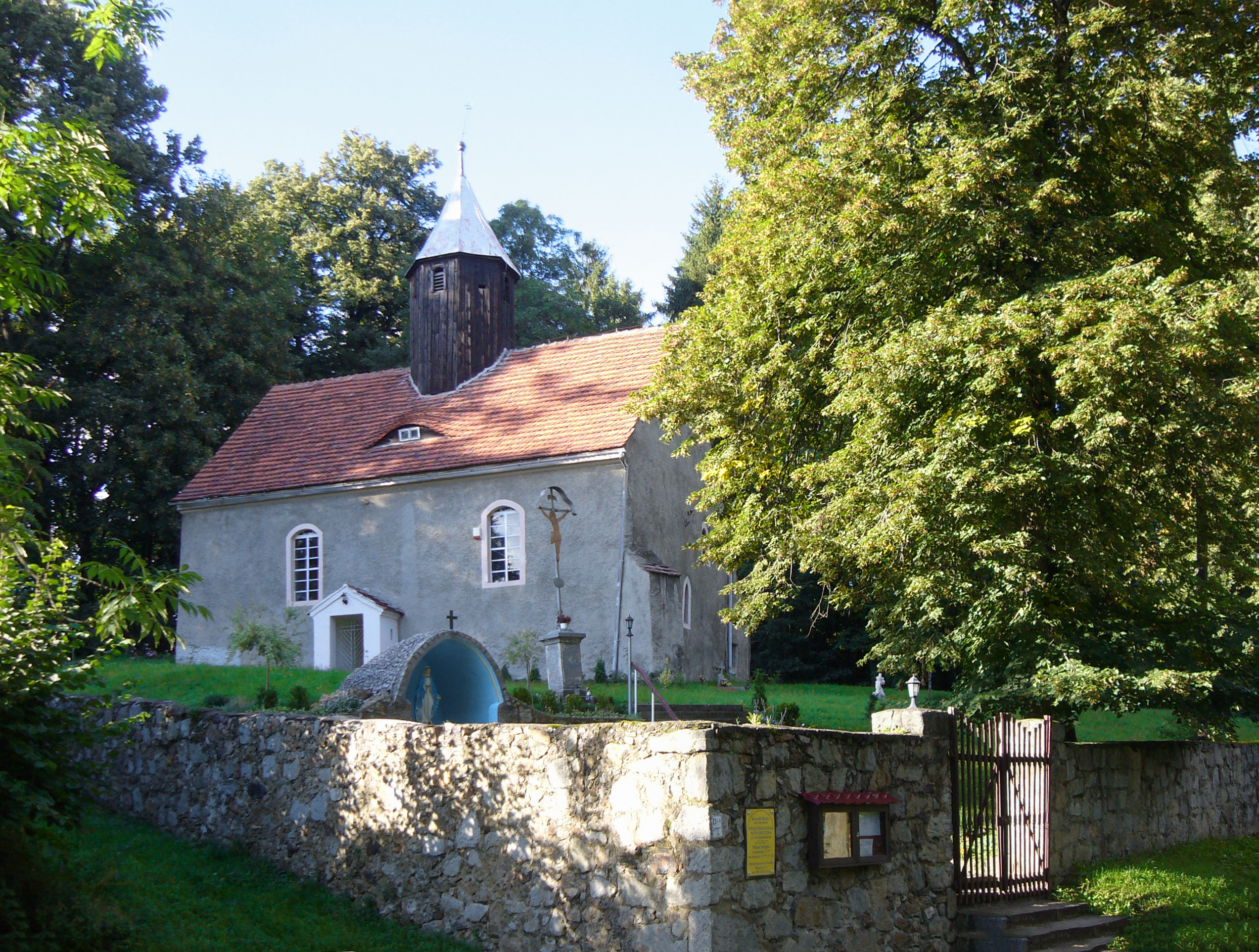
- Church of Saint John of Nepomuk

- Location within Poland
- Coordinates: 51°6′N 15°26′E
- Country: Poland
- Voivodeship: Lower Silesian
- County: Lwówek
- Gmina: Gryfów Śląski

Wolbromów [vɔlˈbrɔmuf] is a village in the administrative district of Gmina Gryfów Śląski, within Lwówek County, Lower Silesian Voivodeship, in south-western Poland.
