= Wielanowo =

- Village
- Location within Poland
- Coordinates: 53°52′N 16°19′E
- Country: Poland
- Voivodeship: West Pomeranian
- County: Szczecinek
- Gmina: Grzmiąca
- Population: 110

Wielanowo [vjɛlaˈnɔvɔ] (formerly German Villnow) is a village in the administrative district of Gmina Grzmiąca, within Szczecinek County, West Pomeranian Voivodeship, in north-western Poland. It lies approximately 30 km (19 mi) north-west of Szczecinek and 125 km (78 mi) north-east of the regional capital Szczecin.

For the history of the region, see History of Pomerania.

The village has a population of 110.
