= Czech (surname) =

Czech is a Polish surname. It may be an ethnonymic surname literally meaning "Czech person" or it may be derived from an abbreviation of given names starting with 'Cze-', such as "Czesław". The surname has archaic feminine forms, still used colloquially: Czechowa (by husband) and Czechówna (by father). Notable people with the surname include:

- Aleksandra Czechówna (1839–1923), Polish diarist
- Bronisław Czech (1908–1944), Polish sportsman and artist
- Danuta Czech (1922–2004), Polish Holocaust historian
- Hermann Czech (born 1936), Austrian architect
- Mirosław Czech (born 1962), Polish politician and journalist of Ukrainian origin
- Zbigniew Czech (born 1970), Polish diplomat

== See also ==
- Chekh, East Slavic variant
- Čech, Czech and Slovak variant
- Čeh, South Slavic variant
- Cseh, Hungarian variant
