= Sucha, Szczecinek County =

Sucha
- Village
- Location within Poland
- Coordinates: 53°50′26″N 16°22′51″E
- Country: Poland
- Voivodeship: West Pomeranian
- County: Szczecinek
- Gmina: Grzmiąca
- Population: 386

Sucha [ˈsuxa] (German: Zuch) is a village in the administrative district of Gmina Grzmiąca, within Szczecinek County, West Pomeranian Voivodeship, in north-western Poland. It lies approximately 25 km (16 mi) north-west of Szczecinek and 128 km (80 mi) east of the regional capital Szczecin.

For the history of the region, see History of Pomerania.

The village has a population of 386.

== Geography ==
- Perznica river

== Notable residents ==
- Gerlach von Gaudecker-Zuch (1909–1970), Wehrmacht officer
