= Glazenap =

Glazenap is a Russian surname of the noble Glasenapp family of Pomeranian origin, a variant of Glasenapp. Notable people with the surname include:

- Bogdan Alexandrovich Glazenap (1811–1892; Gottlieb Friedrich von Glasenapp), Russian admiral
- Sergey Glazenap (1848–1937), Russian astronomer
- Vladimir Grigoryevich Glazenap (1784—1862; Wilhelm Otto von Glasenapp), Russian general

== Fictional characters ==
- Glazenap, fictional army officer from Military Aphorisms by Kozma Prutkov
