= Sławno, Szczecinek County =

Sławno
- Village
- Location within Poland
- Coordinates: 53°51′9″N 16°31′33″E
- Country: Poland
- Voivodeship: West Pomeranian
- County: Szczecinek
- Gmina: Grzmiąca
- Population: 10

Sławno [ˈswavnɔ] (German Schofhütten) is a village in the administrative district of Gmina Grzmiąca, within Szczecinek County, West Pomeranian Voivodeship, in north-western Poland. It lies approximately 19 km (12 mi) north-west of Szczecinek and 138 km (86 mi) east of the regional capital Szczecin.

For the history of the region, see History of Pomerania.

The village has a population of 10.
