= Strzeszyn, Gmina Grzmiąca =

Strzeszyn
- Settlement
- Location within Poland
- Coordinates: 53°52′36″N 16°23′07″E
- Country: Poland
- Voivodeship: West Pomeranian
- County: Szczecinek
- Gmina: Grzmiąca

Strzeszyn [ˈstʂɛʂɨn] (German Altmühl) is a settlement in the administrative district of Gmina Grzmiąca, within Szczecinek County, West Pomeranian Voivodeship, in north-western Poland.

For the history of the region, see History of Pomerania.
