= Kamionka, Szczecinek County =

Kamionka
- Village
- Location within Poland
- Coordinates: 53°51′44″N 16°23′41″E
- Country: Poland
- Voivodeship: West Pomeranian
- County: Szczecinek
- Gmina: Grzmiąca
- Population: 10

Kamionka [kaˈmjɔnka] (German Steinburg) is a village in the administrative district of Gmina Grzmiąca, within Szczecinek County, West Pomeranian Voivodeship, in north-western Poland. It lies approximately 25 km (16 mi) north-west of Szczecinek and 130 km (81 mi) north-east of the regional capital Szczecin.

For the history of the region, see History of Pomerania.

The village at one time had a population of 10.
