= Rząsiny =

- Village
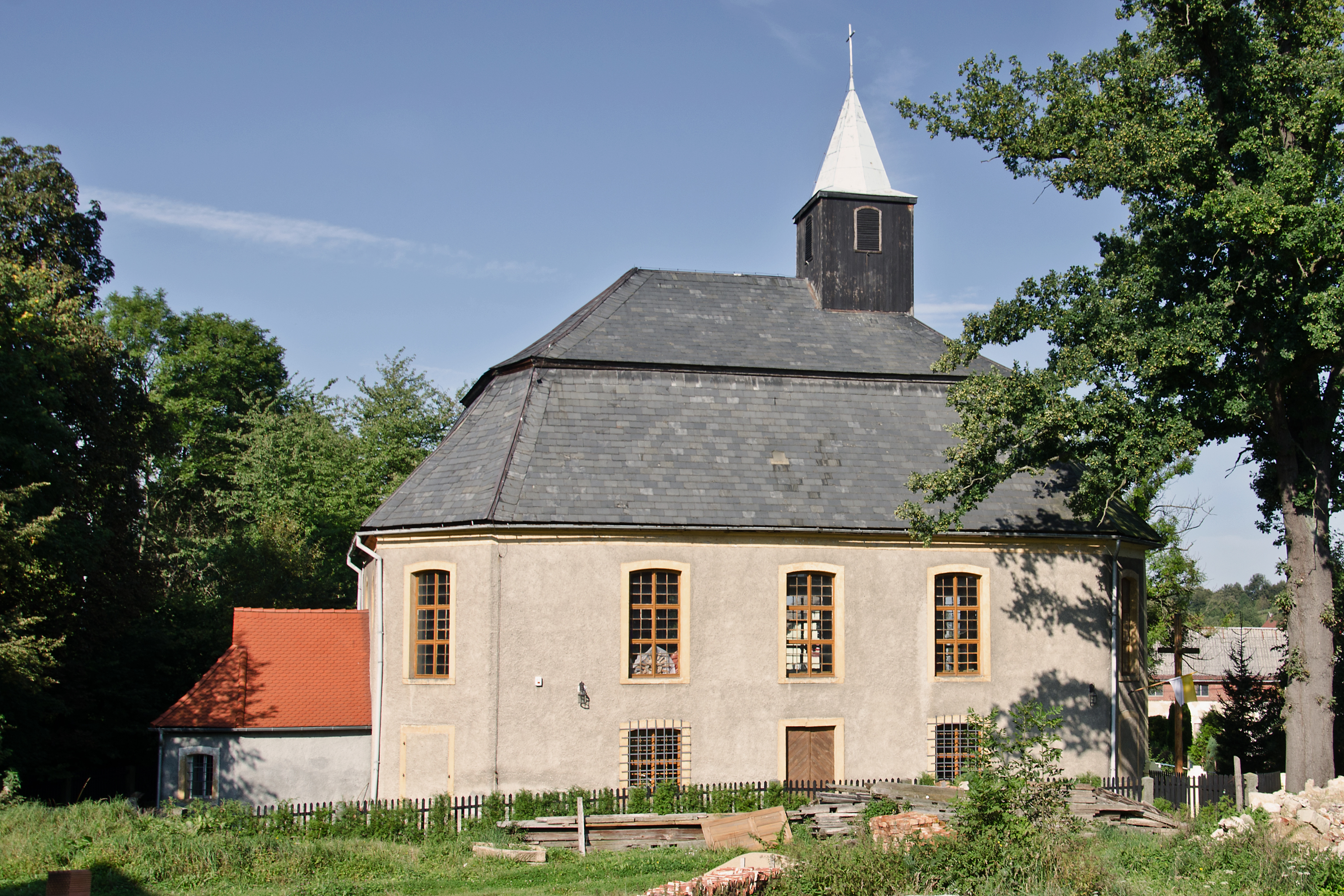
- Church of Our Lady of Ostra Brama

- Location within Poland
- Coordinates: 51°5′N 15°27′E
- Country: Poland
- Voivodeship: Lower Silesian
- County: Lwówek
- Gmina: Gryfów Śląski

Rząsiny [ʐɔ̃ˈɕinɨ], until 1945 Wilcza-Góra, is a village in the administrative district of Gmina Gryfów Śląski, within Lwówek County, Lower Silesian Voivodeship, in south-western Poland.
