= Lubogoszcz, West Pomeranian Voivodeship =

Lubogoszcz
- Village
- Location within Poland
- Coordinates: 53°49′5″N 16°28′0″E
- Country: Poland
- Voivodeship: West Pomeranian
- County: Szczecinek
- Gmina: Grzmiąca
- Population: 360

Lubogoszcz [luˈbɔɡɔʂt͡ʂ] is a village in the administrative district of Gmina Grzmiąca, within Szczecinek County, West Pomeranian Voivodeship, in north-western Poland. It lies approximately 19 km (12 mi) north-west of Szczecinek and 133 km (83 mi) east of the regional capital Szczecin.

For the history of the region, see History of Pomerania.
