= Gdaniec =

- Village
- Location within Poland
- Coordinates: 53°51′38″N 16°26′44″E
- Country: Poland
- Voivodeship: West Pomeranian
- County: Szczecinek
- Gmina: Grzmiąca
- Population: 100

Gdaniec [ˈɡdaɲɛt͡s] (German: Hasendanz) is a village in the administrative district of Gmina Grzmiąca, within Szczecinek County, West Pomeranian Voivodeship, in north-western Poland. It lies approximately 23 km (14 mi) north-west of Szczecinek and 133 km (83 mi) east of the regional capital Szczecin.

The village has a population of 100.

== See also ==
History of Pomerania
