= Czechy, West Pomeranian Voivodeship =

Czechy
- Village
- Location within Poland
- Coordinates: 53°53′N 16°30′E
- Country: Poland
- Voivodeship: West Pomeranian
- County: Szczecinek
- Gmina: Grzmiąca

Czechy [ˈt͡ʂɛxɨ] (German: Zechendorf) is a village in the administrative district of Gmina Grzmiąca, within Szczecinek County, West Pomeranian Voivodeship, in north-western Poland. It lies approximately 9 km (6 mi) north-east of Grzmiąca, 23 km (14 mi) north-west of Szczecinek, and 137 km (85 mi) east of the regional capital Szczecin.

== See also ==
History of Pomerania
