= Przystawy, Szczecinek County =

Przystawy
- Village
- Location within Poland
- Coordinates: 53°52′12″N 16°28′36″E
- Country: Poland
- Voivodeship: West Pomeranian
- County: Szczecinek
- Gmina: Grzmiąca

Przystawy [pʂɨsˈtavɨ] (formerly German Ernsthöhe) is a village in the administrative district of Gmina Grzmiąca, within Szczecinek County, West Pomeranian Voivodeship, in north-western Poland.

For the history of the region, see History of Pomerania.
