= Chekh =

Chekh (pre-reform Russian: Чехъ; Russian: Чех; Ukrainian: Чех; Belarusian: Чэх) is an East Slavic surname, likely of ethnonymic origin, literally meaning "Czech person".

Notable people with the surname include:

- Artem Chekh (born 1985), Ukrainian writer and journalist
- Maksym Chekh (born 1999), Ukrainian footballer
- Yan Chekh (born 1991), Russian yachtsman

== See also ==
- Čech, Czech and Slovak variant
- Čeh, South Slavic variant
- Cseh, Hungarian variant
- Czech, Polish variant
