= Równe, West Pomeranian Voivodeship =

Równe
- Village
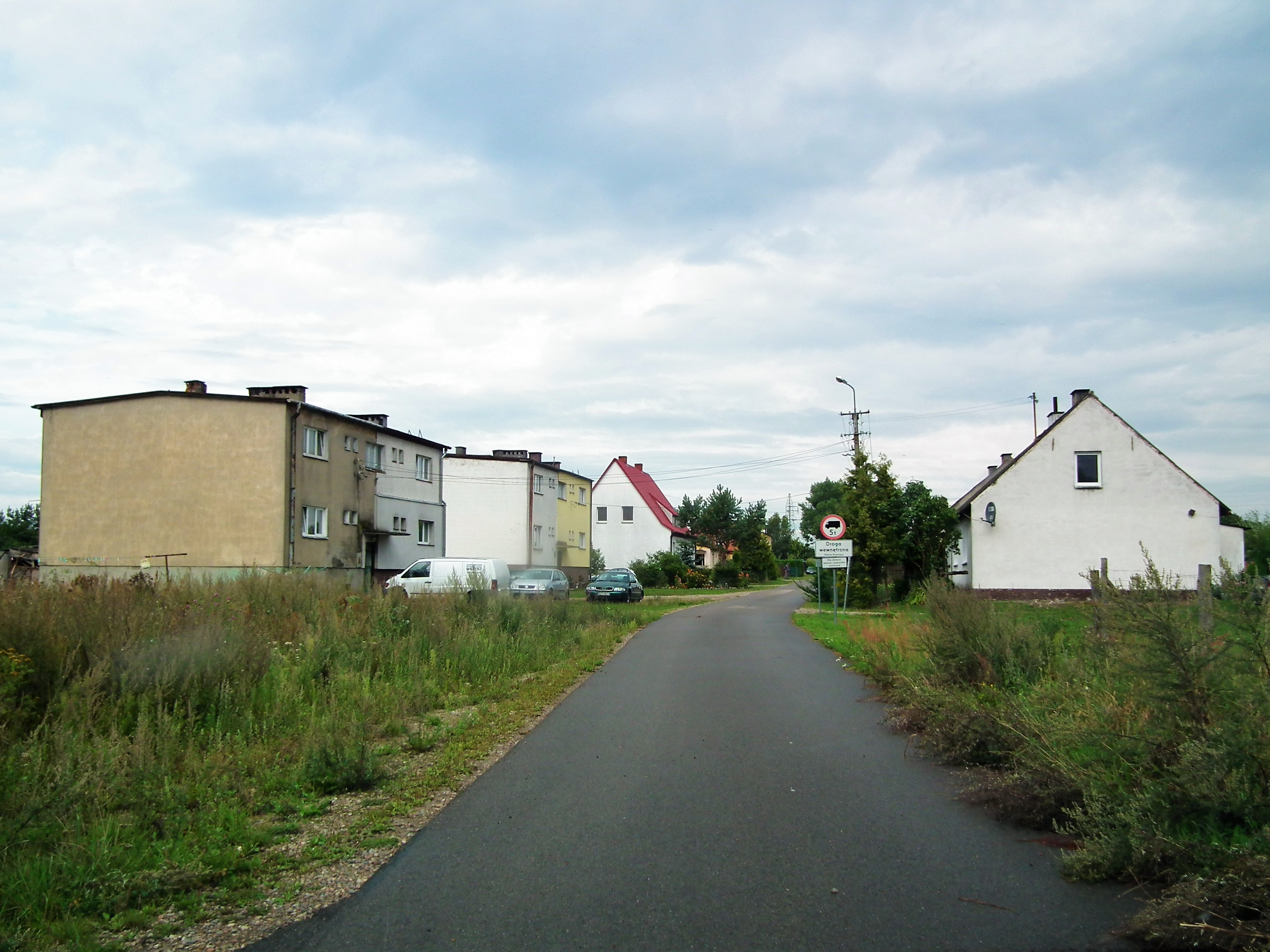

- Location within Poland
- Coordinates: 53°50′35″N 16°27′52″E
- Country: Poland
- Voivodeship: West Pomeranian
- County: Szczecinek
- Gmina: Grzmiąca

Population
  - Total: 170
- Time zone: UTC+1 (CET)
  - Summer (DST): UTC+2 (CEST)
- Postal code: 78-450
- Vehicle registration: ZSZ

Równe [ˈruvnɛ] (German: Raffenberg) is a village in the administrative district of Gmina Grzmiąca, within Szczecinek County, West Pomeranian Voivodeship, in north-western Poland. It lies approximately 21 km (13 mi) north-west of Szczecinek and 133 km (83 mi) east of the regional capital Szczecin.

The village has a population of 170.
