= Wieża =

- Village
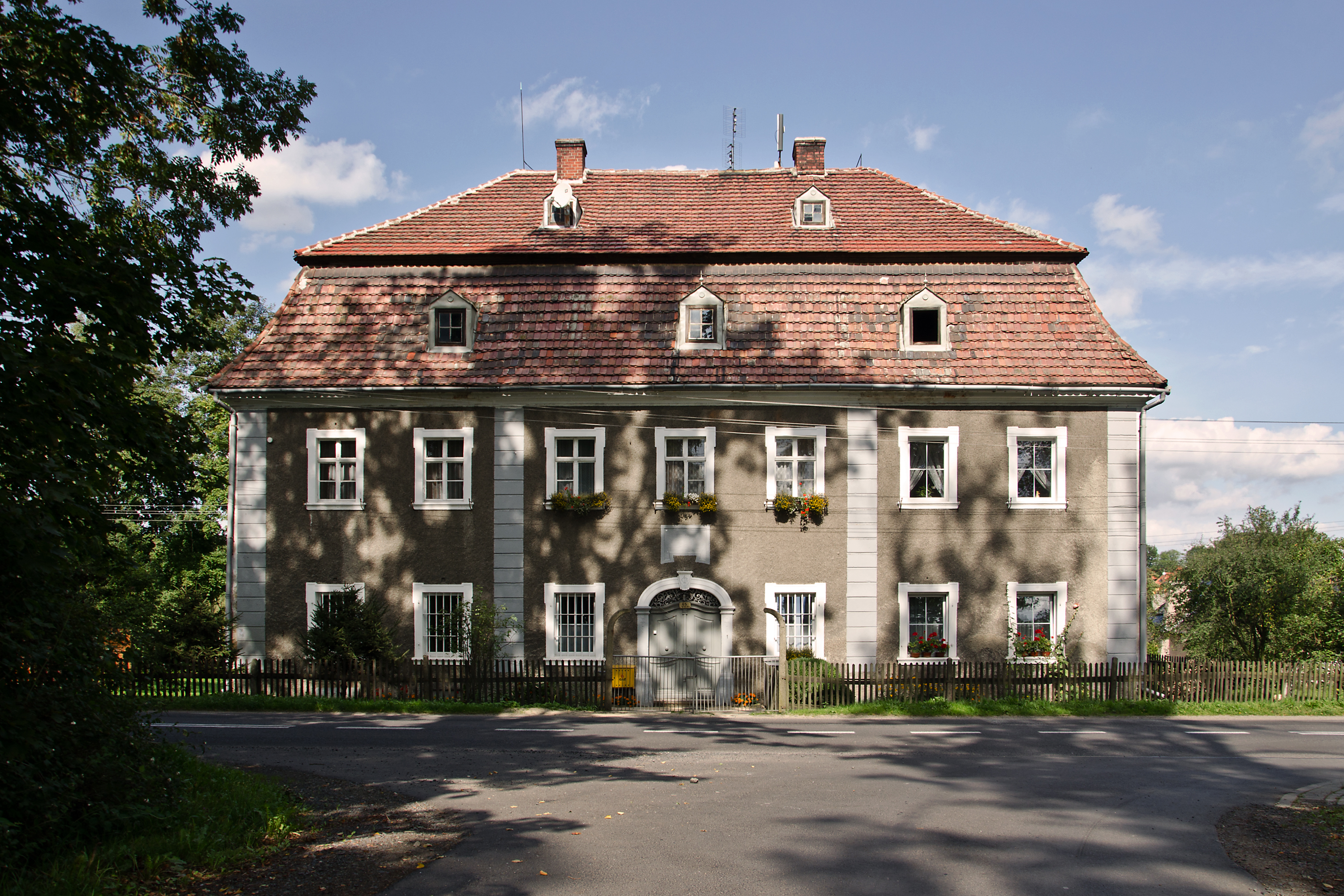
- Former Protestant priest's residence

- Location within Poland
- Coordinates: 51°1′N 15°24′E
- Country: Poland
- Voivodeship: Lower Silesian
- County: Lwówek
- Gmina: Gryfów Śląski

Wieża [ˈvjɛʐa] is a village in the administrative district of Gmina Gryfów Śląski, within Lwówek County, Lower Silesian Voivodeship, in south-western Poland.
