= Nosibądy =

- Village
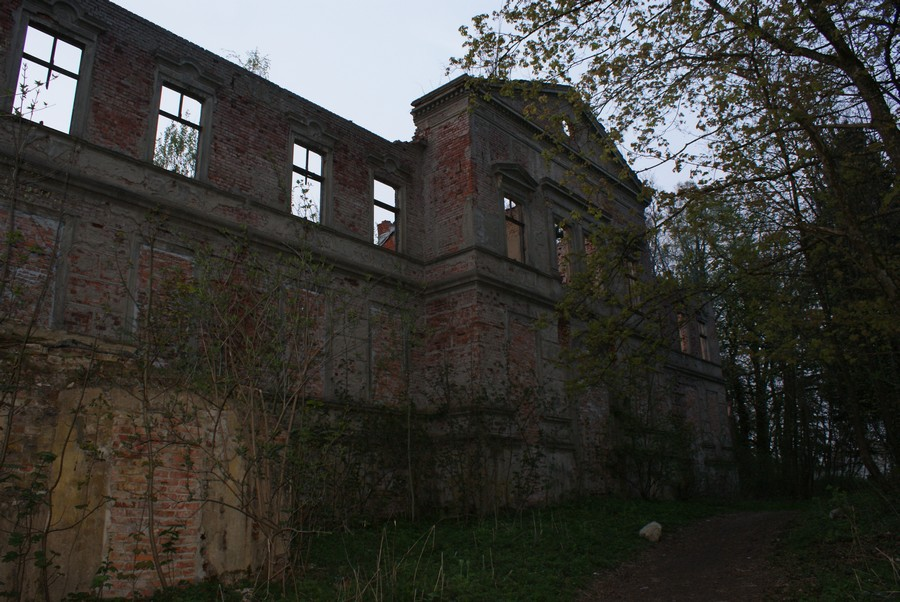
- Derelict palace in Nosibądy

- Location within Poland
- Coordinates: 53°53′31″N 16°21′42″E
- Country: Poland
- Voivodeship: West Pomeranian
- County: Szczecinek
- Gmina: Grzmiąca
- Population: 300

Nosibądy [nɔɕiˈbɔndɨ] (formerly German Naseband) is a village in the administrative district of Gmina Grzmiąca, within Szczecinek County, West Pomeranian Voivodeship, in north-western Poland.

For the history of the region, see History of Pomerania.

The village has a population of 300.
