= Kłośno =

- Settlement
- Location within Poland
- Coordinates: 53°51′41″N 16°21′57″E
- Country: Poland
- Voivodeship: West Pomeranian
- County: Szczecinek
- Gmina: Grzmiąca

Kłośno [ˈkwɔɕnɔ] (German Krämerwinkel) is a settlement in the administrative district of Gmina Grzmiąca, within Szczecinek County, West Pomeranian Voivodeship, in north-western Poland.

For the history of the region, see History of Pomerania.
