= Slovák (disambiguation) =

Slovák may refer to:

- Slovák, a Slovak surname
- Slovák, the official newspaper of the Slovak People's Party

== See also ==
- Slovak (disambiguation)
