= Owczary, West Pomeranian Voivodeship =

Owczary
- Settlement
- Location within Poland
- Coordinates: 53°47′11″N 16°32′01″E
- Country: Poland
- Voivodeship: West Pomeranian
- County: Szczecinek
- Gmina: Grzmiąca

Owczary [ɔfˈt͡ʂarɨ] (German Neuschäferei) is a settlement in the administrative district of Gmina Grzmiąca, within Szczecinek County, West Pomeranian Voivodeship, in north-western Poland.
