= Perznica =

Location
- Country: Poland

Physical characteristics
- Mouth
  - location: Parsęta
  - coordinates: 53°49′22″N 16°20′51″E

Basin features
- Progression: Parsęta→ Baltic Sea

Perznica is a river of Poland, a tributary of the Parsęta near Sucha.
