= Radomyśl, Szczecinek County =

Radomyśl
- Village
- Location within Poland
- Coordinates: 53°45′N 16°31′E
- Country: Poland
- Voivodeship: West Pomeranian
- County: Szczecinek
- Gmina: Grzmiąca

Population
  - Total: 150
- Time zone: UTC+1 (CET)
  - Summer (DST): UTC+2 (CEST)

Radomyśl [raˈdɔmɨɕl] (German Klingbeck) is a village in the administrative district of Gmina Grzmiąca, within Szczecinek County, West Pomeranian Voivodeship, in north-western Poland. It lies approximately 12 km (7 mi) west of Szczecinek and 134 km (83 mi) east of the regional capital Szczecin.

The village has a population of 150.
