= Gmina Gryfów Śląski =

Gmina Gryfów Śląski Gryfów Śląski Commune
- Gmina
- Flag Coat of arms
- Interactive map of Gmina Gryfów Śląski
- Coordinates (Gryfów Śląski): 51°01′38″N 15°25′09″E
- Country: Poland
- Voivodeship: Lower Silesian
- County: Lwówek
- Seat: Gryfów Śląski
- Sołectwos: Krzewie Wielkie, Młyńsko, Proszówka, Rząsiny, Ubocze, Wieża, Wolbromów

Area
  - Total: 66.61 km^{2} (25.72 sq mi)

Population (2019-06-30)
  - Total: 9,697
  - Density: 145.6/km^{2} (377.0/sq mi)
  - Urban: 6,636
  - Rural: 3,061
- Website: http://www.gryfow.pl

Gmina Gryfów Śląski is an urban-rural gmina (administrative district) in Lwówek County, Lower Silesian Voivodeship, in south-western Poland. Its seat is the town of Gryfów Śląski, which lies approximately 16 kilometres (10 mi) south-west of Lwówek Śląski, and 114 kilometres (71 mi) west of the regional capital Wrocław.

The gmina covers an area of 66.61 square kilometres (25.7 sq mi), and as of 2019 its total population is 9,697.

== Neighbouring gminas ==
Gmina Gryfów Śląski is bordered by the gminas of Leśna, Lubań, Lubomierz, Lwówek Śląski, Mirsk, Nowogrodziec and Olszyna.

== Villages ==
Apart from the town of Gryfów Śląski, the gmina contains the villages of Krzewie Wielkie, Młyńsko, Proszówka, Rząsiny, Ubocze, Wieża and Wolbromów.

== Twin towns – sister cities ==
Gmina Gryfów Śląski is twinned with:

- Bischofswerda, Germany
- Gryfice, Poland
- Raspenava, Czech Republic
