= Glewo, West Pomeranian Voivodeship =

Glewo
- Settlement
- Location within Poland
- Coordinates: 53°51′52″N 16°20′54″E
- Country: Poland
- Voivodeship: West Pomeranian
- County: Szczecinek
- Gmina: Grzmiąca

Glewo [ˈɡlɛvɔ] (German Klewerhof) is a settlement in the administrative district of Gmina Grzmiąca, within Szczecinek County, West Pomeranian Voivodeship, in northwest Poland.

== See also ==
History of Pomerania
