= Grzmiączka =

- Settlement
- Location within Poland
- Coordinates: 53°50′N 16°31′E
- Country: Poland
- Voivodeship: West Pomeranian
- County: Szczecinek
- Gmina: Grzmiąca

Grzmiączka [ˈɡʐmjɔnt͡ʂka] (German Gramenzer Busch) is a settlement in the administrative district of Gmina Grzmiąca, within Szczecinek County, West Pomeranian Voivodeship, in northwestern Poland. It lies approximately 17 km (11 mi) northwest of Szczecinek and 136 km (85 mi) east of the regional capital, Szczecin.

For the history of the region, see History of Pomerania.
