= Gmina Grzmiąca =

Gmina Grzmiąca Grzmiąca Commune
- Gmina
- Coat of arms
- Interactive map of Gmina Grzmiąca
- Coordinates (Grzmiąca): 53°50′N 16°24′E
- Country: Poland
- Voivodeship: West Pomeranian
- County: Szczecinek
- Seat: Grzmiąca

Area
  - Total: 204.49 km^{2} (78.95 sq mi)

Population (2006)
  - Total: 5,012
  - Density: 24.51/km^{2} (63.48/sq mi)
- Website: http://www.grzmiaca.org.pl/

Gmina Grzmiąca is a rural gmina (administrative district) in Szczecinek County, West Pomeranian Voivodeship, in north-western Poland. Its seat is the village of Grzmiąca, which lies approximately 23 kilometres (14 mi) north-west of Szczecinek and 129 km (80 mi) east of the regional capital Szczecin.

The gmina covers an area of 204.49 square kilometres (79.0 sq mi), and as of 2006 its total population is 5,012.

Gmina Grzmiąca is bordered by the gminas of Barwice, Bobolice, Borne Sulinowo, Szczecinek and Tychowo.

== Villages ==
Gmina Grzmiąca contains the villages and settlements of:

- Boleszkowice
- Czechy
- Gdaniec
- Glewo
- Godzisław
- Grzmiąca
- Grzmiączka
- Iwin
- Kamionka
- Klepary
- Kłośno
- Krosino
- Lubogoszcz
- Mieszałki
- Nosibądy
- Owczary
- Przeradz
- Przystawy
- Pustkowie
- Radomyśl
- Radostowo
- Radusz
- Równe
- Sławno
- Storkowo
- Strzeszyn
- Sucha
- Świętno
- Ubocze
- Wielanowo
- Wielawino
- Żarnowo
- Zwartowo
