= Radusz, West Pomeranian Voivodeship =

Radusz
- Village
- Location within Poland
- Coordinates: 53°52′20″N 16°25′52″E
- Country: Poland
- Voivodeship: West Pomeranian
- County: Szczecinek
- Gmina: Grzmiąca
- Population: 80

Radusz [ˈraduʂ] (formerly German bef. 1939 Altmühl bei Grünwalde, 1939 Burghof) is a village in the administrative district of Gmina Grzmiąca, within Szczecinek County, West Pomeranian Voivodeship, in north-western Poland.

For the history of the region, see History of Pomerania.

The village has a population of 80.
