= Zwartowo, Szczecinek County =

Zwartowo
- Settlement
- Location within Poland
- Coordinates: 53°49′N 16°20′E
- Country: Poland
- Voivodeship: West Pomeranian
- County: Szczecinek
- Gmina: Grzmiąca

Zwartowo [zvarˈtɔvɔ] (German Schwartow) is a settlement in the administrative district of Gmina Grzmiąca, within Szczecinek County, West Pomeranian Voivodeship, in north-western Poland. It lies approximately 26 km (16 mi) north-west of Szczecinek and 124 km (77 mi) east of the regional capital Szczecin.

For the history of the region, see History of Pomerania.
