= Świętno, West Pomeranian Voivodeship =

Świętno
- Village
- Location within Poland
- Coordinates: 53°49′18″N 16°30′29″E
- Country: Poland
- Voivodeship: West Pomeranian
- County: Szczecinek
- Gmina: Grzmiąca
- Population: 50

Świętno (Polish: [ˈɕfjɛntnɔ]; German: Marienruh) is a village in the administrative district of Gmina Grzmiąca, within Szczecinek County, West Pomeranian Voivodeship, in north-western Poland. It lies approximately 17 km (11 mi) north-west of Szczecinek and 135 km (84 mi) east of the regional capital Szczecin.

For the history of the region, see History of Pomerania.

The village has a population of 50.
