= Klepary, West Pomeranian Voivodeship =

Klepary
- Settlement
- Location within Poland
- Coordinates: 52°51′00″N 18°28′52″E
- Country: Poland
- Voivodeship: West Pomeranian
- County: Szczecinek
- Gmina: Grzmiąca
- Population: 140

Klepary [klɛˈparɨ] (German Oberhof) is a settlement in the administrative district of Gmina Grzmiąca, within Szczecinek County, West Pomeranian Voivodeship, in north-western Poland.

For the history of the region, see History of Pomerania.

The settlement has a population of 140.
