= Pustkowie, West Pomeranian Voivodeship =

Pustkowie
- Settlement
- Location within Poland
- Coordinates: 53°45′21″N 16°30′58″E
- Country: Poland
- Voivodeship: West Pomeranian
- County: Szczecinek
- Gmina: Grzmiąca
- Population: 8

Pustkowie [pustˈkɔvjɛ] (German Pustkowie) is a settlement in the administrative district of Gmina Grzmiąca, within Szczecinek County, West Pomeranian Voivodeship, in north-western Poland. It lies approximately 12 km (7 mi) west of Szczecinek and 134 km (83 mi) east of the regional capital Szczecin.

For the history of the region, see History of Pomerania.

The settlement has a population of 8.
