= Krosino, Szczecinek County =

Krosino
- Village
- Location within Poland
- Coordinates: 53°50′28″N 16°18′19″E
- Country: Poland
- Voivodeship: West Pomeranian
- County: Szczecinek
- Gmina: Grzmiąca
- Population: 530

Krosino [krɔˈɕinɔ] (formerly German: Groß Krössin) is a village in the administrative district of Gmina Grzmiąca, within Szczecinek County, West Pomeranian Voivodeship, in north-western Poland.

For the history of the region, see History of Pomerania.

The village has a population of 530.
