= Czechia (disambiguation) =

Czechia is the official short form name of the Czech Republic. It may also refer to:

- Historical Czech lands
- Czechoslovakia (1918–1993)
- Czech Socialist Republic (1969–1990)
- Protectorate of Bohemia and Moravia (1939–1945)

== See also ==
- Bohemia, the largest part of the Czech Republic; its name is similar to "Czechia" in many languages, and may occasionally be called so in translations into English
- Czech Republic (disambiguation)
- Czech (disambiguation)
- Czechoslovak (disambiguation)
- Name of the Czech Republic
