= Młyńsko railway station =

Railway station in Młynsko, south-western Poland

Młyńsko
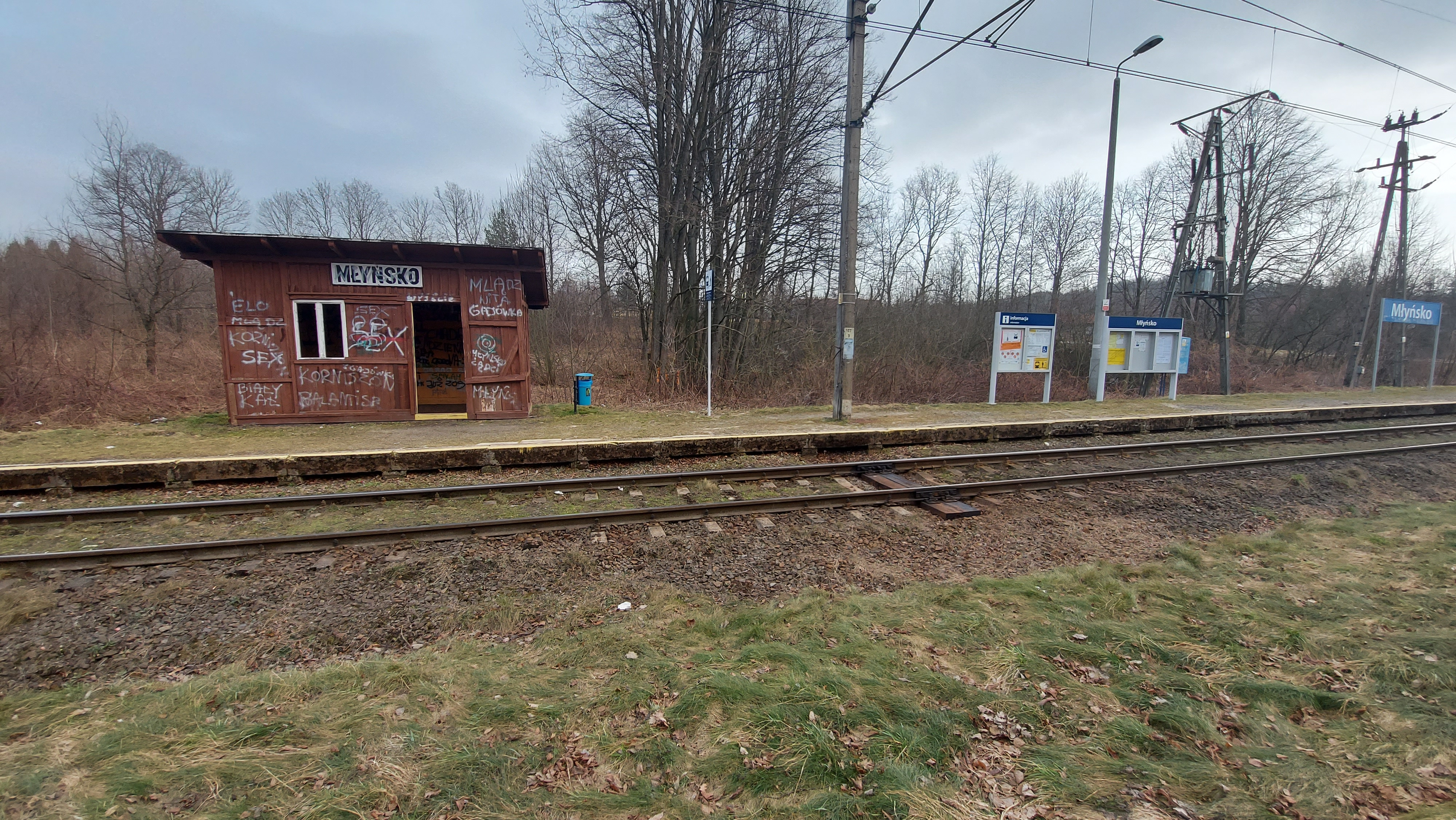
- Station in February 2021

General information
- Location: Młynsko, Lower Silesian Voivodeship; Poland
- Coordinates: 50°59′21.1″N 15°27′01.1″E
- Owner: PKP Polskie Linie Kolejowe
- Line: Wrocław Świebodzki–Zgorzelec
- Platforms: 1

History
- Opened: 1 October 1898
- Former names: Mühlseiffen (1898–1945); Młyńsk (1945–1947)

Services
Preceding station	KD	Following station
Rębiszów towards Karpacz	D62	Gryfów Śląski towards Görlitz
Location
- Location within Poland Location within Lower Silesian Voivodeship

Młyńsko is a railway station in the village of Młyńsko, Lwówek County within the Lower Silesian Voivodeship in south-western Poland.

== History ==
The station was opened by Prussian State Railways as Mühlseiffen on 1 October 1898. After World War II, the area came under Polish administration. As a result, the station was taken over by Polish State Railways. It was renamed to Młynsk in 1945, and eventually to its modern name, Młyńsko, in 1947.

== Train services ==
The station is a request stop of Lower Silesian Railways services.

The station is served by the following services:

- Regional services (KD) Karpacz / Świeradów-Zdrój - Gryfów Śląski - Görlitz
