= Godzisław, West Pomeranian Voivodeship =

Godzisław
- Village
- Location within Poland
- Coordinates: 53°54′N 16°27′E
- Country: Poland
- Voivodeship: West Pomeranian
- County: Szczecinek
- Gmina: Grzmiąca

Godzisław [ɡɔˈd͡ʑiswaf] (German Glasenapp) is a village in the administrative district of Gmina Grzmiąca, within Szczecinek County, West Pomeranian Voivodeship, in north-western Poland. It lies approximately 26 km (16 mi) north-west of Szczecinek and 135 km (84 mi) north-east of the regional capital Szczecin.

== See also ==
- History of Pomerania
