= Ubocze, Lower Silesian Voivodeship =

Ubocze
- Village
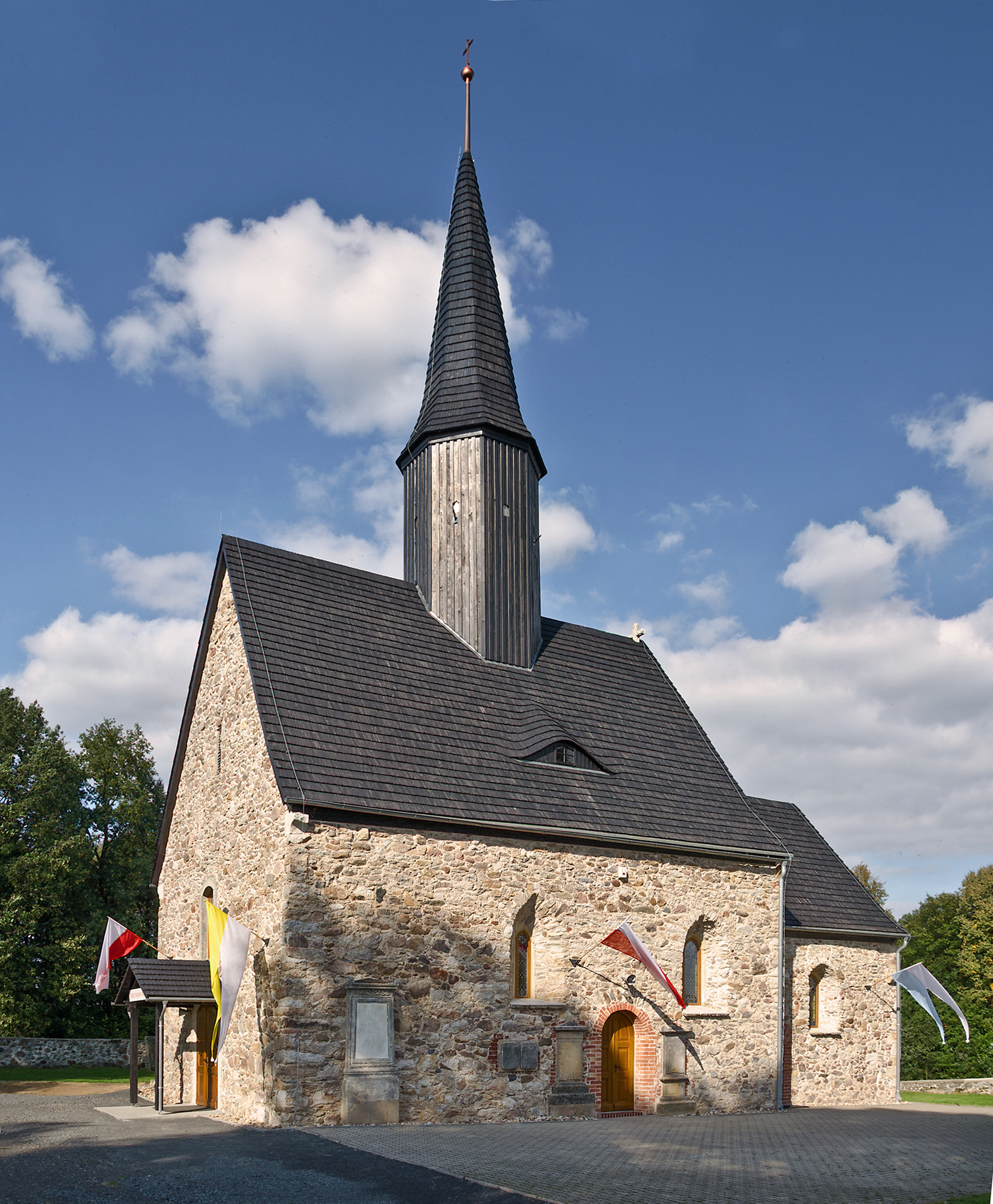
- Church of the Visitation of the Virgin Mary

- Location within Poland
- Coordinates: 51°03′27″N 15°25′20″E
- Country: Poland
- Voivodeship: Lower Silesian
- County: Lwówek
- Gmina: Gryfów Śląski

Population
  - Total: 1,500

Ubocze [uˈbɔt͡ʂɛ] is a village in the administrative district of Gmina Gryfów Śląski, within Lwówek County, Lower Silesian Voivodeship, in south-western Poland.
