= Młyńsko, Lower Silesian Voivodeship =

Młyńsko
- Village
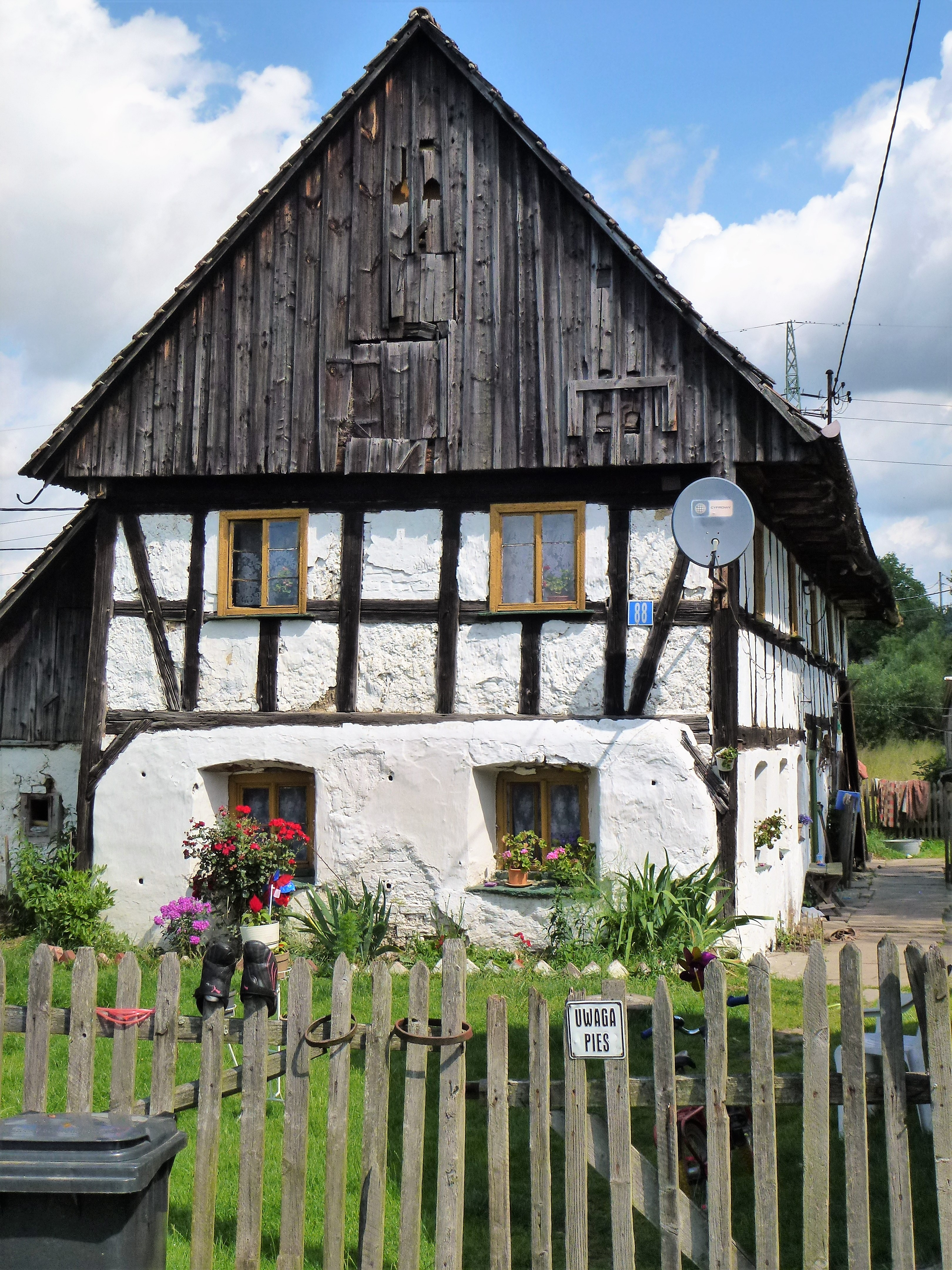

- Location within Poland
- Coordinates: 50°59′N 15°27′E
- Country: Poland
- Voivodeship: Lower Silesian
- County: Lwówek
- Gmina: Gryfów Śląski

Młyńsko [ˈmwɨɲskɔ] is a village in the administrative district of Gmina Gryfów Śląski, within Lwówek County, Lower Silesian Voivodeship, in south-western Poland.

The village is home to Młyńsko railway station.
