= Vladimír Čech =

Czech actor, presenter and politician (1951–2013)

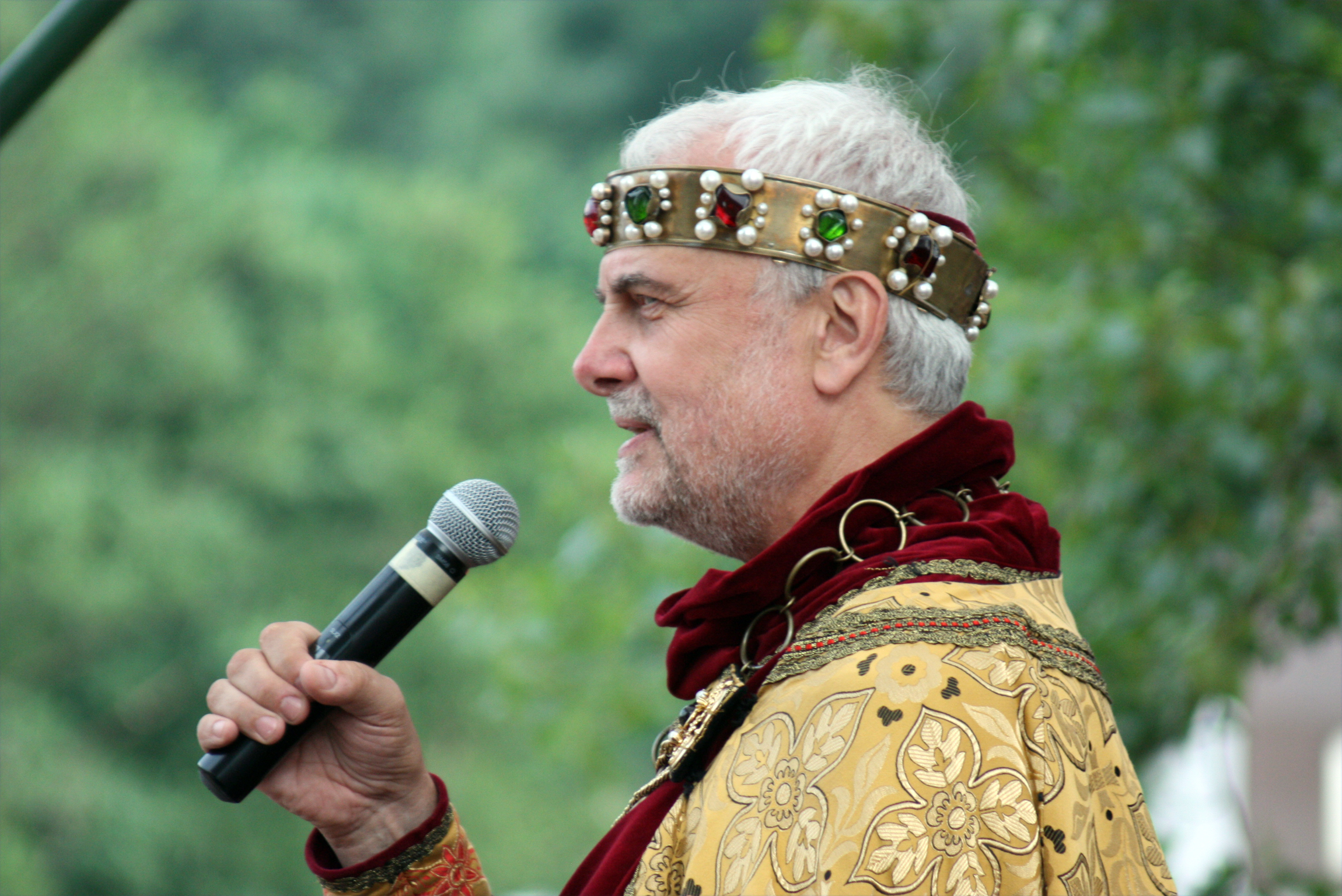
- Born: 6 July 1951; Prague, Czechoslovakia
- Died: 22 March 2013 (aged 61); Prague
- Occupations: Actor and host

Vladimír Čech (6 July 1951 – 22 March 2013) was a Czech actor, presenter and politician.

== Early life ==
Čech was the son of anchorwoman Heda Čechová (1928–2020) and actor of the same name, Vladimír Čech (1916–1990).

In 1977, Čech graduated from the Theatre Faculty of the Academy of Performing Arts acting field before playing at Petr Bezruč Theatre in Ostrava, the Silesian Theatre in Opava, Ostrava State Theatre, the Český Těšín Theatre, Oldřich Stibor State Theatre in Olomouc (present-day Moravian Theatre), and in the East Bohemia Theatre in Pardubice. From 1990 to 1992, he worked as a member of the Czech National Council. Čech was a freelance actor, a member of File City theatres in Prague in 1999. He was also a host of the Czech version of Who Wants to Be a Millionaire? titled Chcete být milionářem? until September 2003. In 2008, Czech Television made a documentary series Na vrcholky hor s Vladimírem Čechem with Čech as the main character. On the same television channel, he was the moderator of the program Barvy života.

== Career ==
Čech was known for his voice in dubbing, such as the title character in the cartoons and films about Garfield. He played dozens of theatrical roles and appeared e.g. as Vavřen in Filozofské historie, as Edmund in King Lear, as Mercutio in Romeo and Juliet, in Hamlet, as Antony in Antony and Cleopatra, as Jiří in the Czech adaptation of Who's Afraid of Virginia Woolf?, as Iago in Othello and many others. Between 2001 and 2003 he was elected the host of most popular competition in the television TýTý.

== Personal life and death ==
Čech died of Lynch syndrome and pneumonia in 2013 at the age of 61.

== Czech dubbing ==
- Putování s pravěkými monstry – život před dinosaury (Walking with Monsters), 2005, dubbing 2008
- Van Helsing
- Vraždící stroje: Pravda o dinosaurech-zabijácích (The Truth About Killer Dinosaurs, part 1 and 2), 2005, dubbing 2008
- Garfield a přátelé (Garfield and Friends)
- Garfield ve filmu (Garfield: The Movie), 2004
- Garfield 2 (Garfield: A Tail of Two Kitties), 2006
- Garfield šokuje (Garfield Gets Real), 2007
- Milionář z chatrče (Slumdog Millionaire) 2008
