= Olga Čechová =

Czech printmaker

Olga Čechová (6 April 1925 – 24 November 2010) was a Czech printmaker.

== Biography ==
A native of Brno, Čechová studied at the School of Arts and Crafts in that city from 1941 until 1944. From 1946 until 1951 she was a student at the Academy of Arts, Architecture and Design in Prague, where she was a pupil of Karel Svolinský and Antonín Strnadel.

She was active mainly as an illustrator, and her work appeared in many magazines and books, both for children and for adults. One of her prints is owned by the National Gallery of Art.
