= Čech (disambiguation) =

Čech may refer to:

- Čech, a Czech surname
- Czech (Czech: Čech), the figure from the Lech, Czech, and Rus legend
- Czechs (Czech: Češi, singular: Čech – Czech), nation and ethnic group
- Stone–Čech compactification, mathematical technique
- Čech cohomology, mathematical theory

== See also ==
- Cech (disambiguation)
- Čeh, a Slovene and Serbo-Croatian surname
