= Cseh =

Cseh ("Czech" in Hungarian, pronounced [ˈt͡ʃɛ]) is a surname. Notable people with the surname include:

- Andreo Cseh (1895–1979), Hungarian/Dutch Roman Catholic priest and Esperantist
- Anna Marie Cseh (born 1977), Hungarian actress and model
- Ervin Cseh (1838–1918), Hungarian politician
- Ferenc Cseh (1943–2018), Hungarian sprint kayaker
- Gábor Cseh (1916–1979), Hungarian sprint canoeist
- Katalin Cseh (born 1988), Canadian-born Hungarian physician and politician
- László Cseh (born 1985), Hungarian swimmer
- László Cseh (footballer) (1910–1950), Hungarian footballer
- László Cseh Sr. (1952–2020), Hungarian swimmer
- Martin Cseh (born 1988), Slovak footballer
- Szabolcs Cseh (1942–2014), Romanian stuntman and actor of Székely origin
- Tamás Cseh (1943–2009), Hungarian composer, singer and actor

== See also ==
- Čech, Czech and Slovak variant
- Čeh, South Slavic variant
- Chekh, East Slavic variant
- Czech, Polish variant
