= Čechy (Přerov District) =

- Municipality
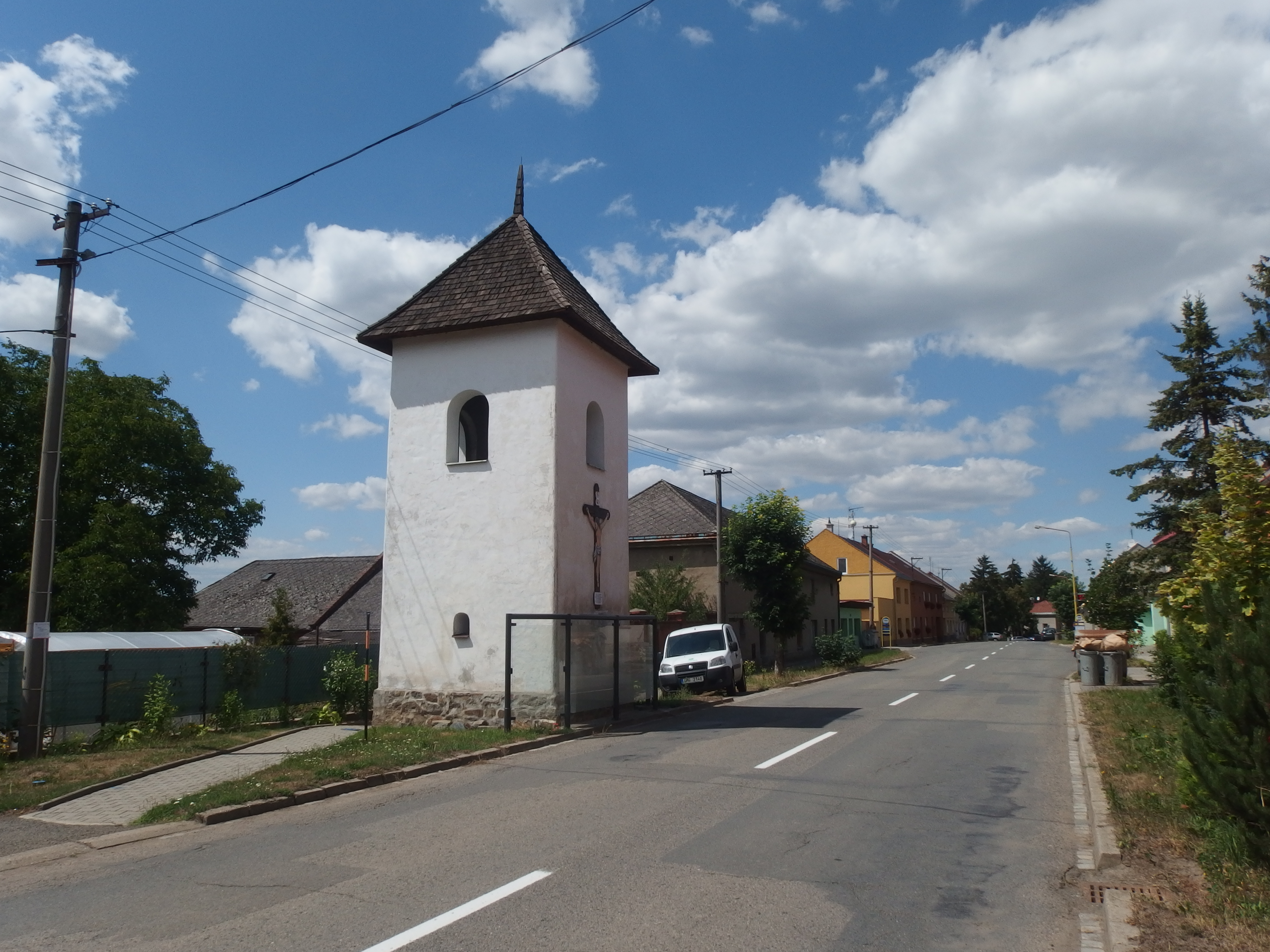
- Belfry in the centre of Čechy

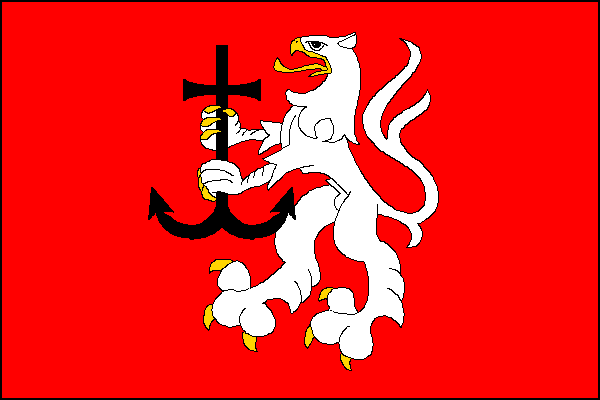
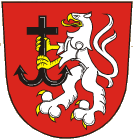
- Flag Coat of arms

- Location in the Czech Republic
- Coordinates: 49°25′45″N 17°32′4″E
- Country: Czech Republic
- Region: Olomouc
- District: Přerov
- First mentioned: 1358

Area
  - Total: 4.55 km^{2} (1.76 sq mi)
- Elevation: 226 m (741 ft)

Population (2026-01-01)
  - Total: 329
  - Density: 72.3/km^{2} (187/sq mi)
- Time zone: UTC+1 (CET)
  - Summer (DST): UTC+2 (CEST)
- Postal code: 751 15
- Website: www.cechyobec.cz

Čechy is a municipality and village in Přerov District in the Olomouc Region of the Czech Republic. It has about 300 inhabitants.

Čechy lies approximately 7 kilometres (4 mi) south-east of Přerov, 28 km (17 mi) south-east of Olomouc, and 236 km (147 mi) east of Prague.

== Demographics ==
Historical population
Year	Pop.	±%
1869	372	—
1880	366	−1.6%
1890	390	+6.6%
1900	441	+13.1%
1910	489	+10.9%
1921	468	−4.3%
1930	478	+2.1%
1950	384	−19.7%
1961	439	+14.3%
1970	411	−6.4%
1980	405	−1.5%
1991	344	−15.1%
2001	331	−3.8%
2011	325	−1.8%
2021	286	−12.0%
Source: Censuses
