= Ubocze, West Pomeranian Voivodeship =

Ubocze
- Village
- Location within Poland
- Coordinates: 53°53′52″N 16°24′5″E
- Country: Poland
- Voivodeship: West Pomeranian
- County: Szczecinek
- Gmina: Grzmiąca
- Population: 30

Ubocze [uˈbɔt͡ʂɛ] (German Augustenhof) is a village in the administrative district of Gmina Grzmiąca, within Szczecinek County, West Pomeranian Voivodeship, in north-western Poland. It lies approximately 28 km (17 mi) north-west of Szczecinek and 132 km (82 mi) north-east of the regional capital Szczecin.

For the history of the region, see History of Pomerania.

The village has a population of 30.
