= Zbigniew Czech =

Polish civil servant

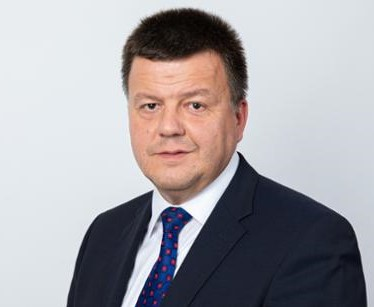

Poland Ambassador to the United Nations Office at Geneva
- In office January 2018 – July 2024
- Preceded by: Piotr Stachańczyk
- Succeeded by: Mirosław Broiło

Personal details
- Born: 16 March 1970 (age 56) Białystok
- Children: 4 daughters
- Education: University of Warsaw
- Profession: Diplomat

Zbigniew Czech (born 30 March 1970 in Białystok) is a Polish civil servant who served as permanent representative to the United Nations Office at Geneva from 2018 to 2024.

== Life ==
Zbigniew Czech graduated in law from the University of Warsaw branch in Białystok (1994) as well as postgraduate Latin American studies at the University of Warsaw (1995) and in international security policy at the Institut des hautes études de défense nationale in Paris (2014).

He started his diplomatic career in 1995 at the Legal and Treaty Department at the Ministry of Foreign Affairs. He has worked at the Permanent Delegation of the Republic of Poland to NATO and WEU in Brussels (1999–2003) and NATO headquarters in Brussels as a legal adviser and private officer of the Secretary General of NATO (2003–2006). In 2009, he became deputy director of the Legal and Treaty Department (MFA) and, in 2012, acting director of the Dearment of the Amecias. Between 2012 and 2014, he was deputy chief of the Embassy of Poland in Paris. In 2016, he was promoted to the director of the United Nations and Human Rights Department.

In January 2018 he was appointed as Permanent Representative of the Republic of Poland to the UN Office in Geneva. He ended his term in July 2024.

He can speak English, French, Spanish and Russian languages. He is married with four daughters.
