= Heda Čechová =

Czech television anchorwoman (1928–2020)

Member of the Czech National Council
- In office 7 June 1990 – 4 June 1992

Personal details
- Born: Heda Šimandlová; 17 July 1928 Prague, Czechoslovakia
- Died: 23 April 2020 (aged 91) Czech Republic
- Party: Civic Forum
- Children: Vladimír Čech

Heda Čechová (17 July 1928 – 23 April 2020) was a Czech television anchorwoman, radio presenter, and politician. She later served as a member of the Czech National Council for the Civic Forum from 1990 until 1992 following the Velvet Revolution and Czechoslovakia's transition to democracy.

== Biography ==
Čechová was born Heda Šimandlová in Prague, Czechoslovakia, on 17 July 1928. She began working as a radio announcer at Czechoslovak Radio, where her father worked, while still a student studying chemistry after World War II. She transitioned to an on-screen television anchor and presenter beginning in 1954. She became one of Czechoslovakia's most popular television anchors during the 1960s.

Her television career ended in 1968 with the Warsaw Pact invasion of Czechoslovakia that crushed the Prague Spring. Čechová and her colleagues were forbidden from reporting on the ongoing invasion. In response, Heda Čechová wore a black dress during her television show to protest both the invasion and its censorship by state-owned television. Čechová was dismissed from her on-air television anchor position and demoted to a job as a records keeper in the station archives. In 1977, she retired from the television station with a disability pension due to a cancer diagnosis. She was given just three months to live at the time of her diagnosis. However, she underwent surgery and six weeks of radiation therapy, which successfully cured the cancer.

She considered emigrating, but remained in the country due to her son.

Čechová briefly entered politics following the Velvet Revolution and fall of communism in Czechoslovakia. She was elected to the Czech National Council, the legislative body of the Czech Republic during its federation with Czechoslovakia, as a member of the Civic Forum from 1990 to 1992. She noted that she didn't enter politics for money (the salary was just 12 thousand Czechoslovak koruna per month), but because "we certainly didn't do it, the feeling of freedom was important to us." She left politics after leaving office in 1992.

Čechová was married twice, including her first marriage to actor Vladimír Čech Sr., which ended in divorce. Her only child, actor and television host Vladimír Čech, died from Lynch syndrome in 2013.

Heda Čechová died on 23 April 2020, at the age of 91.
