= Filip Čech =

Czech ice hockey player

- Born: June 25, 1980 (age 45) Havířov, Czechoslovakia
- Height: 5 ft 11 in (180 cm)
- Weight: 185 lb (84 kg; 13 st 3 lb)
- Position: Forward
- Shoots: Left
- Czech Extraliga team: HC Zlín
- Playing career: 2000–present

Filip Čech (born June 25, 1980, in Havířov) is a Czech professional ice hockey player. He played with HC Zlín in the Czech Extraliga during the 2010–11 Czech Extraliga season.
