= Boleszkowice, Szczecinek County =

Boleszkowice
- Village
- Location within Poland
- Coordinates: 53°51′54″N 16°17′44″E
- Country: Poland
- Voivodeship: West Pomeranian
- County: Szczecinek
- Gmina: Grzmiąca
- Population: 60

Boleszkowice [bɔlɛʂkɔˈvit͡sɛ] (German Karlshöhe) is a village in the administrative district of Gmina Grzmiąca, in Szczecinek County, West Pomeranian Voivodeship, Poland. It lies approximately 31 km (19 mi) north-west of Szczecinek and 124 km (77 mi) north-east of the regional capital Szczecin.

The village has a population of 60.

== See also ==
History of Pomerania
