= Soňa Čechová =

Slovak translator(1930 – 2007)

- Born: Soňa Kňazovičová; 9 September 1930; Bratislava, Czechoslovakia
- Died: 4 March 2007 (aged 76); Bratislava, Slovakia
- Education: Comenius University
- Occupations: Translator, editor
- Children: 2
- Writing career
- Language: Slovak

Soňa Čechová (née Kňazovičová; 9 September 1930 – 4 March 2007) was a Slovak translator and promoter of Czecho-Slovak unity. She was the editor in chief of the Mosty magazine, which focused on better mutual understanding before Czechs and Slovaks.

== Biography ==
Soňa Čechová was born on 9 September 1930 in Bratislava to a prominent family of Lutheran intellectuals. Her grandfather Metod Bella was among the signatories of Martin Declaration, which declared the desire of Slovak intellectuals to form Czechoslovakia. Čechová was educated at the girls' grammar school in Bratislava and Prague. In 1952, she graduated in Slovak and Russian languages from the Comenius University.

Following her graduation, Čechová worked as a translator in the Tatran editorial house. She translated novels by Leo Tolstoy, Franz Kafka and Vladimir Nabokov into Slovak. During the Prague Spring, she translated also some books that had been previously censored by the Communist regime, such as Doctor Zhivago by Boris Pasternak.

Following the Warsaw Pact invasion of Czechoslovakia, during the Normalization period, Čechová was a part of the dissent. Her son Vladimír Čech was among the few Slovak signatories of Charter 77. Due to her political positions, she was fired from Tatran and worked as a librarian until her retirement. After the Velvet Revolution, she was able to return to literary work as an editor in the Kultúry život magazine.

In reaction to calls for Slovak independence, Čechová joined the Mosty magazine started by her son Vladimír Čech. Following the premature death of her son in 1994, she became the editor of chief of the magazine, which she published for 15 years. In addition, she organized various meetings of Czech and Slovak intellectuals to maintain the ties following the dissolution of the common state.

In 2002, she received the Medal of Merit from the Czech president Václav Havel for her lifelong efforts in promoting unity between Czechs and Slovaks.

== Personal life and death ==
Soňa Čechová had two children. From her first marriage, she had a son Vladimír Čech (1950–1994). From her second marriage to the historian Eduard Friš, she had a daughter Marta Frišová (born 1962, married to the journalist Martin Šimečka). Her third husband was the philosopher Teodor Münz.

Soňa Čechová died in Bratislava on 4 March 2007.
