= Csehi =

- Flag Coat of arms

- Location of Vas county in Hungary

- Location of Csehi
- Coordinates: 47.03371°N 16.94517°E
- Country: Hungary
- County: Vas

Area
  - Total: 9.34 km^{2} (3.61 sq mi)

Population (2004)
  - Total: 301
  - Density: 32.22/km^{2} (83.4/sq mi)
- Time zone: UTC+1 (CET)
  - Summer (DST): UTC+2 (CEST)
- Postal code: 9833
- Area code: 94

Csehi is a village in Vas County, Hungary.
