= Slovak =

Slovak may refer to:

- Something from, related to, or belonging to Slovakia (Slovenská republika)
- Slovaks, a Western Slavic ethnic group
- Slovak language, an Indo-European language that belongs to the West Slavic languages
- Slovak, Arkansas, United States
- Slovák (disambiguation)
