= Čeh =

Čeh is a surname meaning "Czech" in Slovene and Serbo-Croatian. Notable people with the surname include:

- Aleš Čeh (born 1968), Slovenian footballer
- Aleš Čeh (footballer, born 1980), Slovenian footballer
- Kristjan Čeh (born 1999), Slovenian discus thrower
- Nastja Čeh (born 1978), Slovenian footballer
- Sandi Čeh (born 1983), Slovenian footballer
- Tim Čeh (born 1994), Slovenian footballer

== See also ==
- Čech, Czech and Slovak variant
- Chekh, East Slavic variant
- Cseh, Hungarian variant
- Czech, Polish variant
