= Grzmiąca, West Pomeranian Voivodeship =

Grzmiąca
- Village
- Location within Poland
- Coordinates: 53°50′N 16°24′E
- Country: Poland
- Voivodeship: West Pomeranian
- County: Szczecinek
- Gmina: Grzmiąca
- Population: 1,375

Grzmiąca [ˈɡʐmjɔnt͡sa] (German: Gramenz) is a village in Szczecinek County, West Pomeranian Voivodeship, in northwest Poland. It is the seat of the gmina (administrative district) called Gmina Grzmiąca. It lies approximately 23 km (14 mi) north-west of Szczecinek and 129 km (80 mi) east of the regional capital Szczecin.

For the history of the region, see History of Pomerania.

The village has a population of 1,375.
