= Pasechnik =

Pasechnik is an East Slavic surname. Its cognates include Pasichnyk, Pasiecznik, and Pasečņiks.

Notable people with the surname include:

- Alena Pasechnik (born 1995), Belarusian athlete
- Leonid Pasechnik (born 1970), Russian politician
- Vladimir Pasechnik (1937–2001), Soviet bioweaponeer

== See also ==
- Pasichnyk (disambiguation)
