= Pasichnyk =

Pasichnyk, alternatively Pasichnik, is a Ukrainian surname. Its cognates include Pasechnik, Pasiecznik, and Pasečņiks.

Notable people with the surname include:

- Kirill Pasichnik (born 1994), Kazakhstani footballer
- Natalya Pasichnyk (born 1971), Swedish-Ukrainian pianist
- Olga Pasichnyk (born 1968), Polish-Ukrainian soprano
- Viktor Pasichnyk (born 1992), Ukrainian skier

== See also ==
- Pasechnik (disambiguation)
