= Gmina Lubomierz =

Gmina Lubomierz Lubomierz Commune
- Gmina
- Flag Coat of arms
- Interactive map of Gmina Lubomierz
- Coordinates (Lubomierz): 51°01′N 15°31′E
- Country: Poland
- Voivodeship: Lower Silesian
- County: Lwówek
- Seat: Lubomierz
- Sołectwos: Chmieleń, Golejów, Janice, Maciejowiec, Milęcice, Oleszna Podgórska, Pasiecznik, Pławna Dolna, Pławna Górna, Pokrzywnik, Popielówek, Radoniów, Wojciechów

Area
  - Total: 130.39 km^{2} (50.34 sq mi)

Population (2019-06-30)
  - Total: 6,192
  - Density: 47.49/km^{2} (123.0/sq mi)
  - Urban: 1,979
  - Rural: 4,213
- Website: http://www.lubomierz.pl/

Gmina Lubomierz is an urban-rural gmina (administrative district) in Lwówek County, Lower Silesian Voivodeship, in south-western Poland. Its seat is the town of Lubomierz, which lies approximately 13 kilometres (8 mi) south-west of Lwówek Śląski, and 108 kilometres (67 mi) west of the regional capital Wrocław.

The gmina covers an area of 130.39 square kilometres (50.3 sq mi), and as of 2019 its total population is 6,192.

== Neighbouring gminas ==
Gmina Lubomierz is bordered by the gminas of Gryfów Śląski, Lwówek Śląski, Mirsk, Stara Kamienica and Wleń.

== Villages ==
Apart from the town of Lubomierz, the gmina contains the villages of Chmieleń, Golejów, Janice, Maciejowiec, Milęcice, Oleszna Podgórska, Pasiecznik, Pławna Dolna, Pławna Górna, Pokrzywnik, Popielówek, Radoniów and Wojciechów.

== Twin towns – sister cities ==
Gmina Lubomierz is twinned with:

- Mszana Dolna, Poland
- Tanvald, Czech Republic
- Terebovlia, Ukraine
- Wittichenau, Germany
- Zbarazh, Ukraine
