= Chmieleń =

- Village
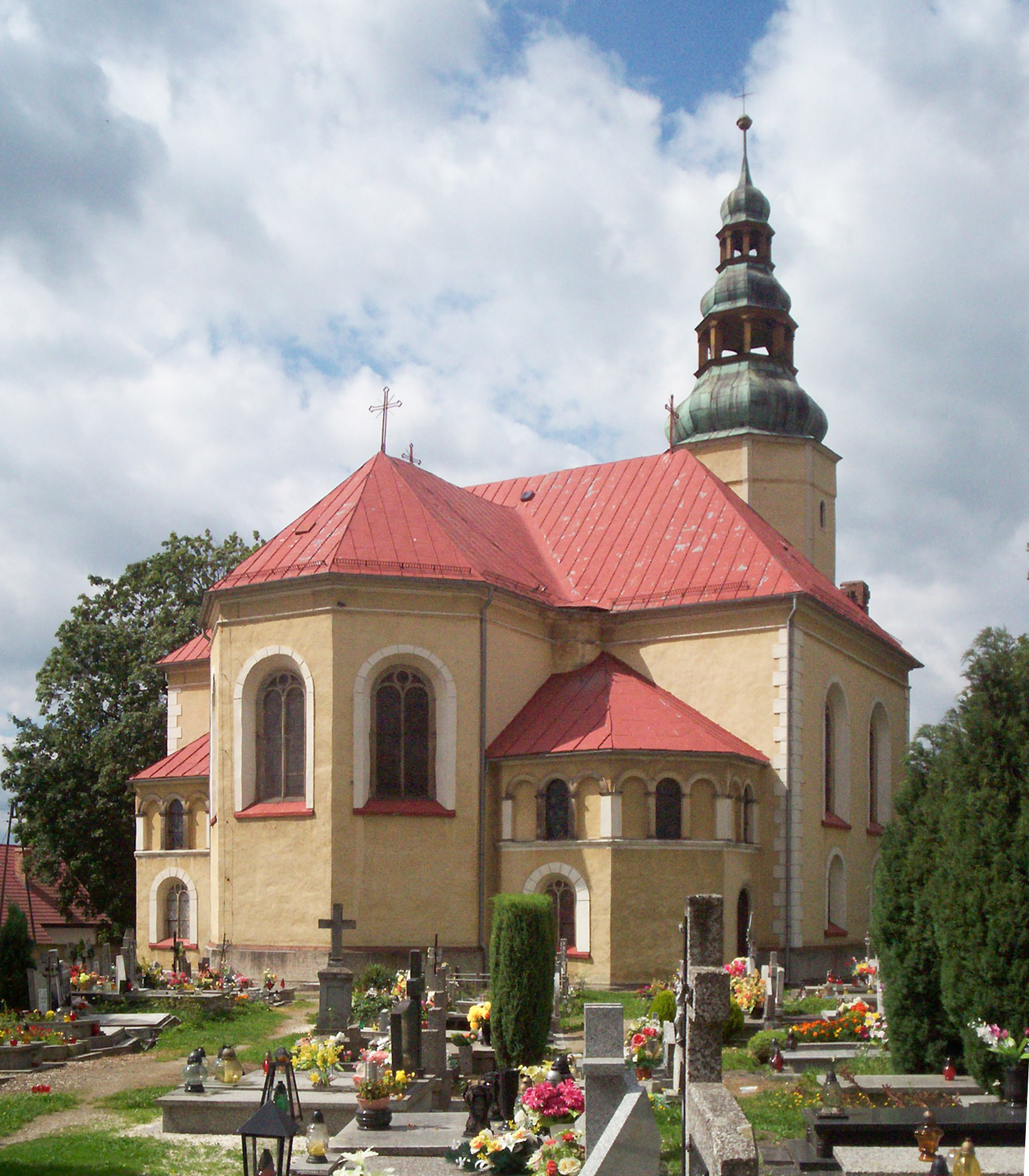
- Church of Saint Nicholas

- Location within Poland
- Coordinates: 50°58′46″N 15°28′44″E
- Country: Poland
- Voivodeship: Lower Silesian
- County: Lwówek
- Gmina: Lubomierz

Population
  - Total: 560
- Time zone: UTC+1 (CET)
  - Summer (DST): UTC+2 (CEST)
- Vehicle registration: DLW

Chmieleń (Polish pronunciation: [ˈxmjɛlɛj̃]) is a village in the administrative district of Gmina Lubomierz, within Lwówek County, Lower Silesian Voivodeship, in south-western Poland.

A minor trade route passed through the village in the late medieval and early modern periods, connecting Wrocław, Bolków and Jelenia Góra with Gryfów, Lubań and Zgorzelec.
