= Popielówek =

- Village
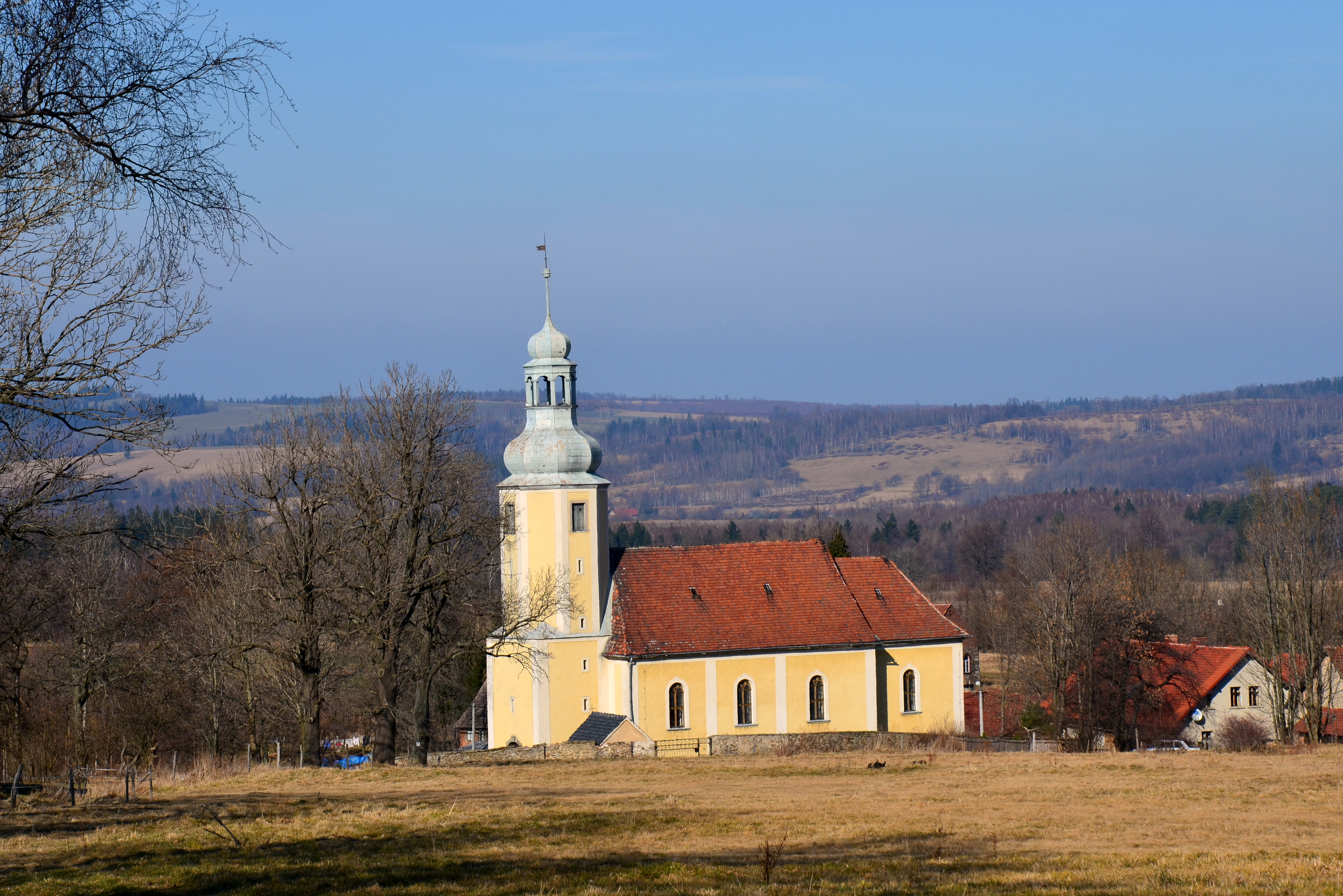

- Location within Poland
- Coordinates: 50°59′N 15°32′E
- Country: Poland
- Voivodeship: Lower Silesian
- County: Lwówek
- Gmina: Lubomierz

Popielówek [pɔpjɛˈluvɛk] is a village in the administrative district of Gmina Lubomierz, within Lwówek County, Lower Silesian Voivodeship, in south-western Poland.
