= Pławna Dolna =

- Village
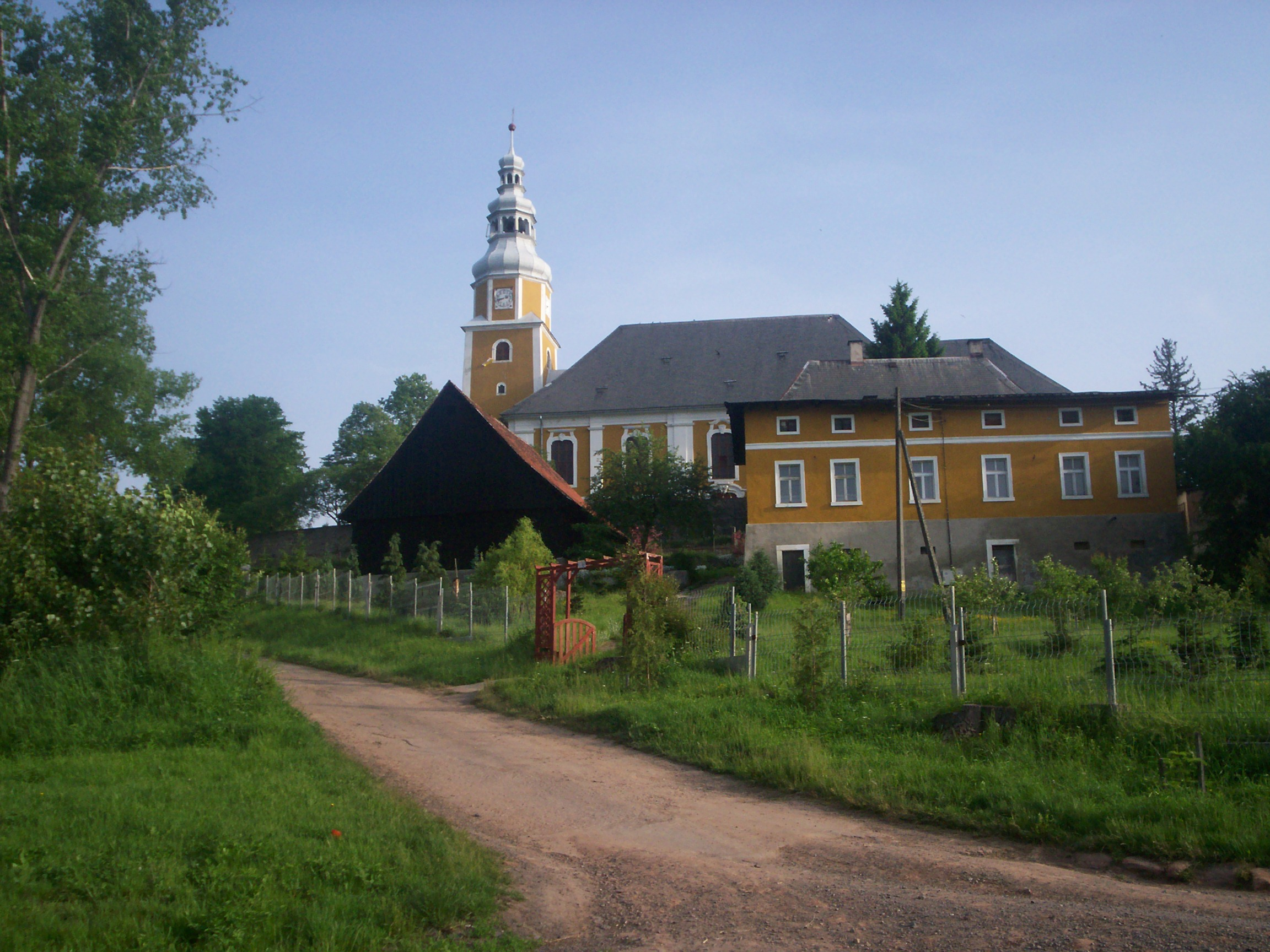
- Saint Tekla Church

- Location within Poland
- Coordinates: 51°03′44″N 15°36′01″E
- Country: Poland
- Voivodeship: Lower Silesian
- County: Lwówek
- Gmina: Lubomierz
- Highest elevation: 400 m (1,300 ft)
- Lowest elevation: 255 m (837 ft)
- Population: 500

Pławna Dolna [ˈpwavna ˈdɔlna] is a village in the administrative district of Gmina Lubomierz, within Lwówek County, Lower Silesian Voivodeship, in south-western Poland.
