= Maciejowiec =

- Village
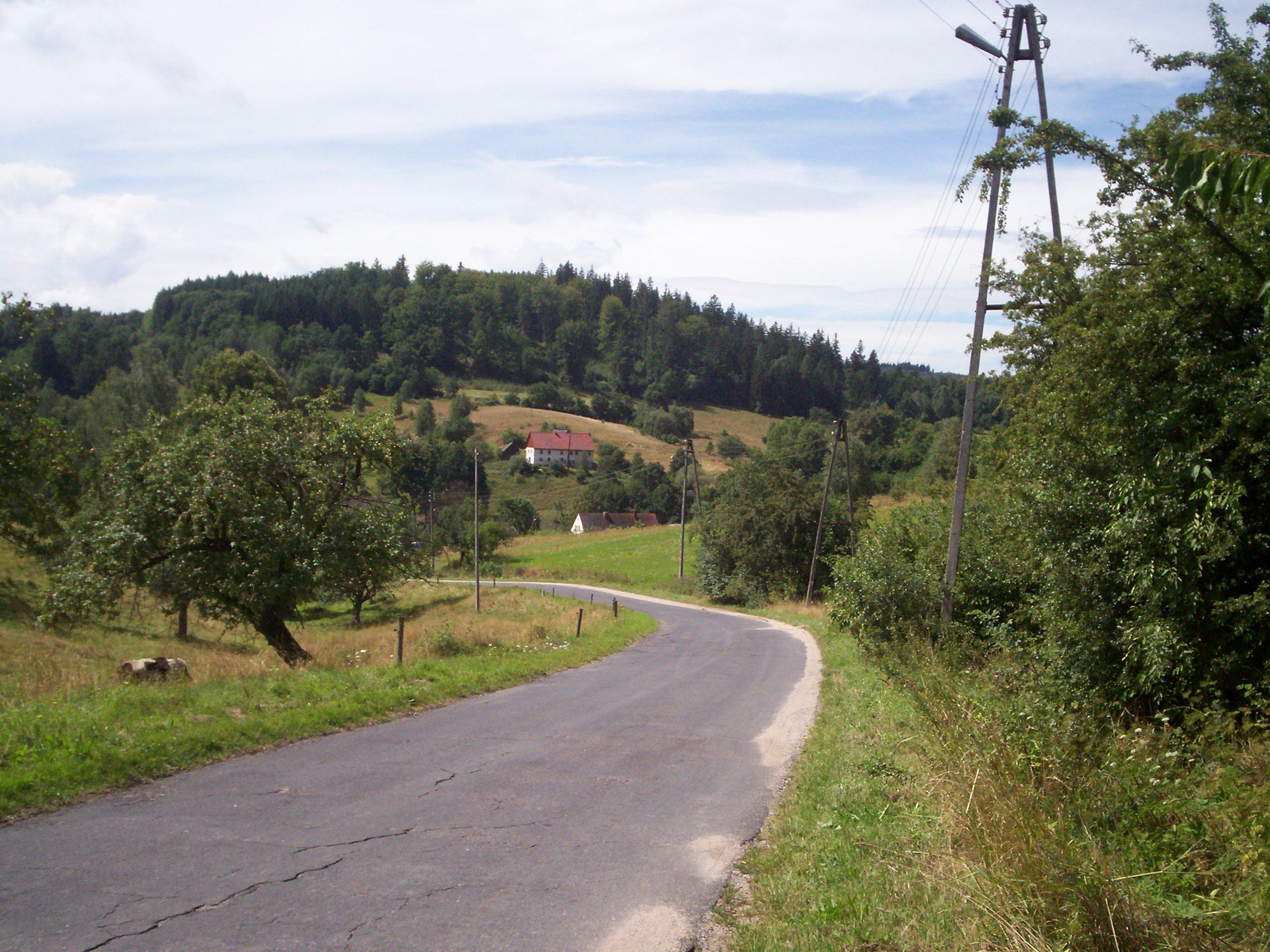

- Location within Poland
- Coordinates: 50°58′N 15°37′E
- Country: Poland
- Voivodeship: Lower Silesian
- County: Lwówek
- Gmina: Lubomierz

Maciejowiec [mat͡ɕɛˈjɔvjɛt͡s] is a village in the administrative district of Gmina Lubomierz, within Lwówek County, Lower Silesian Voivodeship, in south-western Poland.
