= Golejów, Lower Silesian Voivodeship =

Golejów
- Village
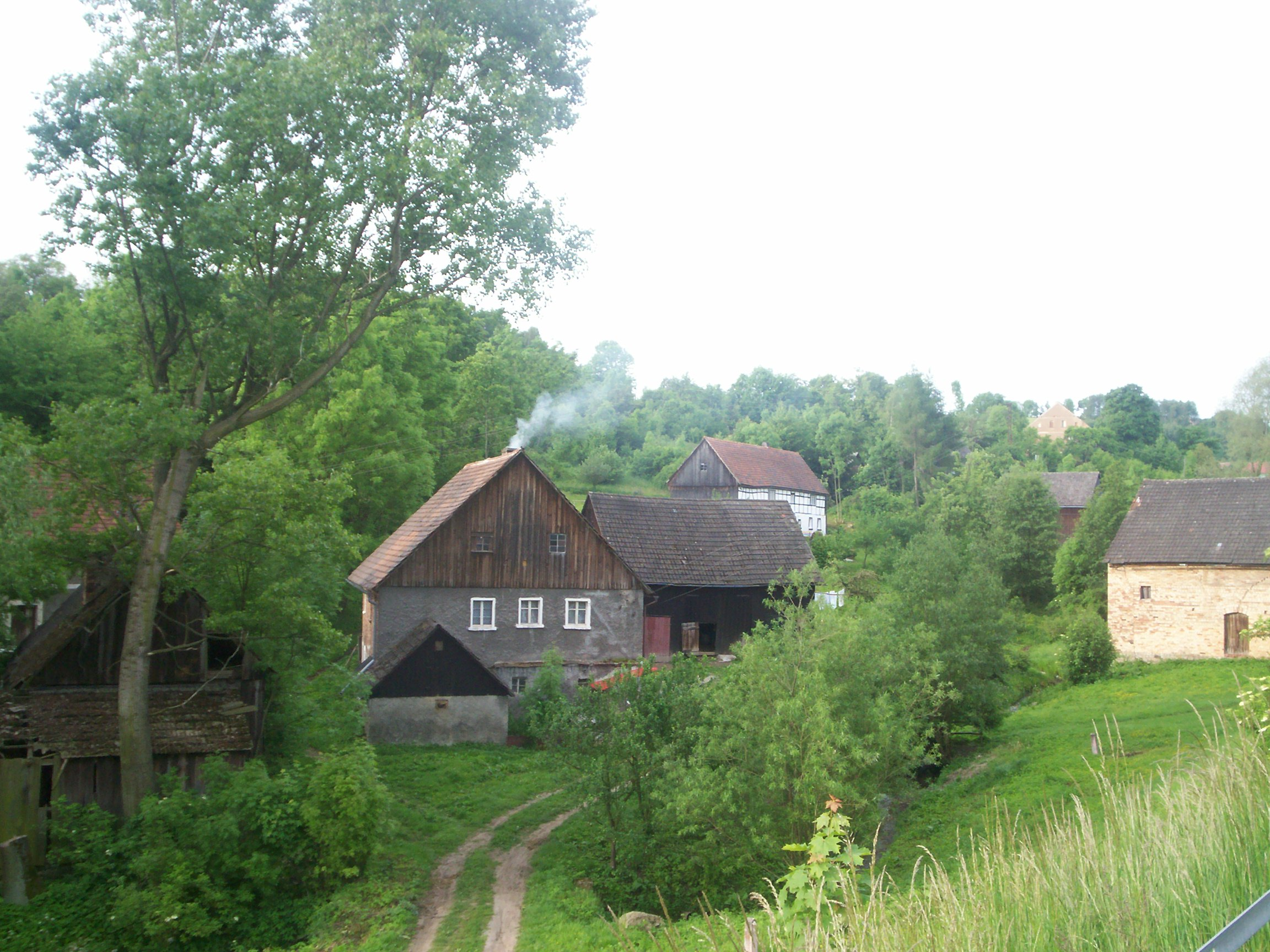

- Location within Poland
- Coordinates: 51°01′24″N 15°35′22″E
- Country: Poland
- Voivodeship: Lower Silesian
- County: Lwówek
- Gmina: Lubomierz

Golejów [ɡɔˈlɛjuf] is a village in the administrative district of Gmina Lubomierz, within Lwówek County, Lower Silesian Voivodeship, in south-western Poland.
