= Radoniów =

- Village
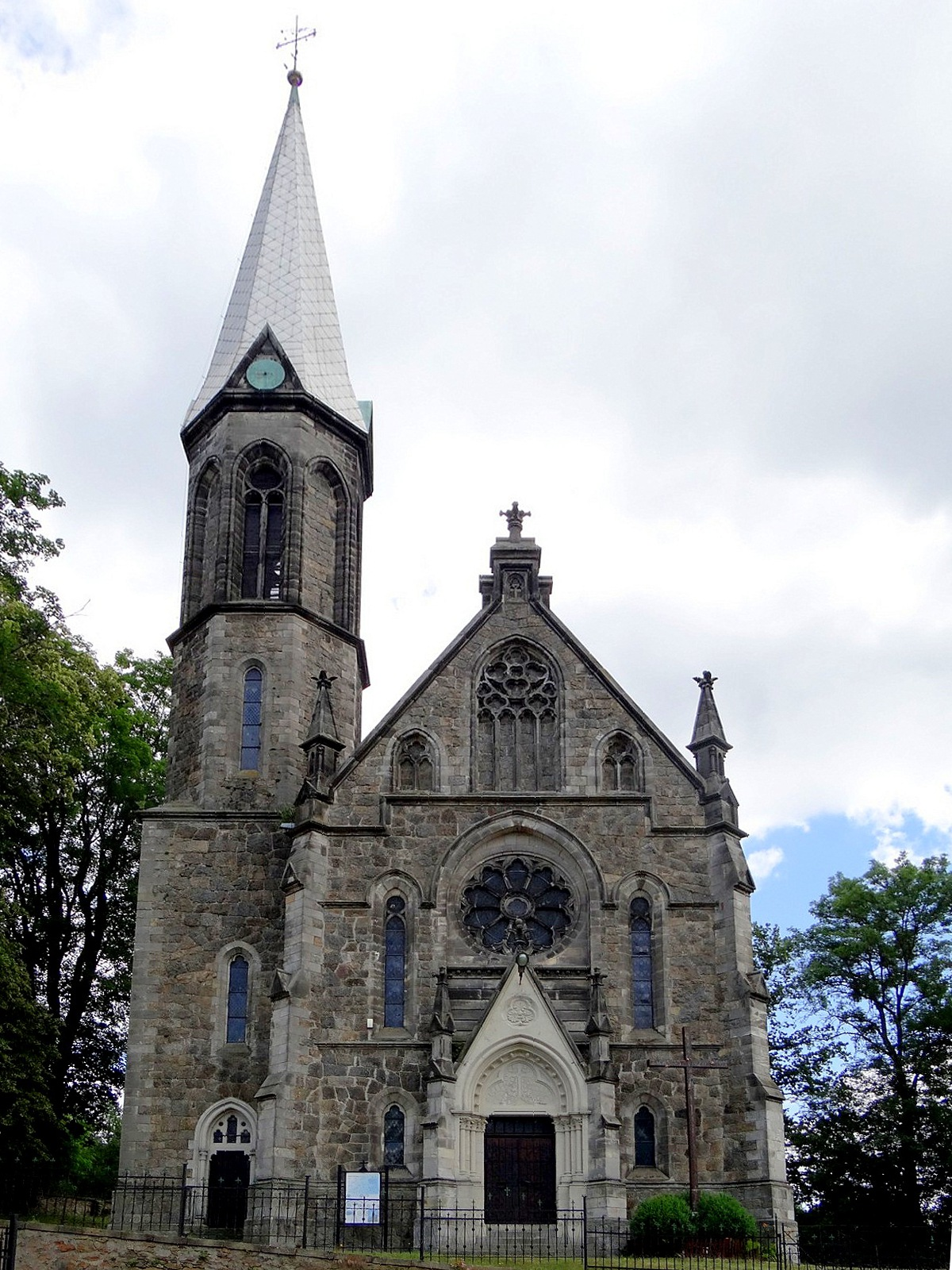
- Exaltation of the Holy Cross church in Radoniów

- Location within Poland
- Coordinates: 51°0′N 15°28′E
- Country: Poland
- Voivodeship: Lower Silesian
- County: Lwówek
- Gmina: Lubomierz
- Time zone: UTC+1 (CET)
  - Summer (DST): UTC+2 (CEST)
- Vehicle registration: DLW

Radoniów [raˈdɔɲuf] is a village in the administrative district of Gmina Lubomierz, within Lwówek County, Lower Silesian Voivodeship, in south-western Poland.

A minor trade route passed through the village in the late medieval and early modern periods, connecting Wrocław, Bolków and Jelenia Góra with Gryfów, Lubań and Zgorzelec.
