= Janice, Lower Silesian Voivodeship =

Janice
- Village
- Location within Poland
- Coordinates: 50°57′19″N 15°31′57″E
- Country: Poland
- Voivodeship: Lower Silesian
- County: Lwówek
- Gmina: Lubomierz

Janice [jaˈnit͡sɛ] is a village in the administrative district of Gmina Lubomierz, within Lwówek County, Lower Silesian Voivodeship, in south-western Poland.
