= Lubomierz =

Town in Poland

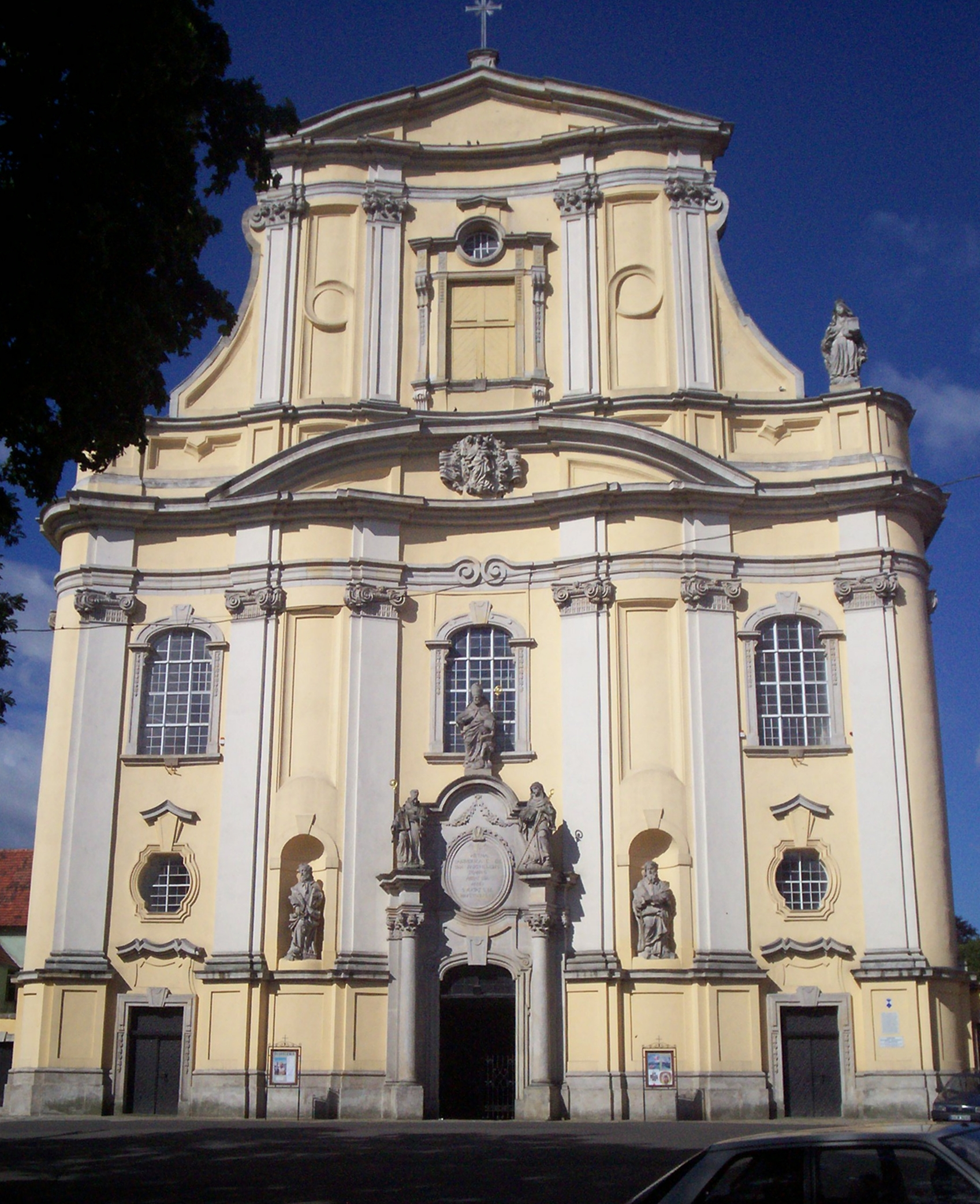
- Catholic Church of Saint Mary

- Coat of arms

- Location within Poland
- Coordinates: 51°1′N 15°31′E
- Country: Poland
- Voivodeship: Lower Silesian
- County: Lwówek
- Gmina: Lubomierz

Area
  - Total: 8.05 km^{2} (3.11 sq mi)

Population (2019-06-30)
  - Total: 1,979
  - Density: 246/km^{2} (637/sq mi)
- Time zone: UTC+1 (CET)
  - Summer (DST): UTC+2 (CEST)
- Vehicle registration: DLW
- Website: http://www.lubomierz.pl

Lubomierz ([luˈbɔmʲɛʂ]; German: Liebenthal) is a town in Lwówek County, Lower Silesian Voivodeship, in south-western Poland. It is the seat of the administrative district (gmina) called Gmina Lubomierz.

As of 2019, the town has a population of 1,979.

== History ==
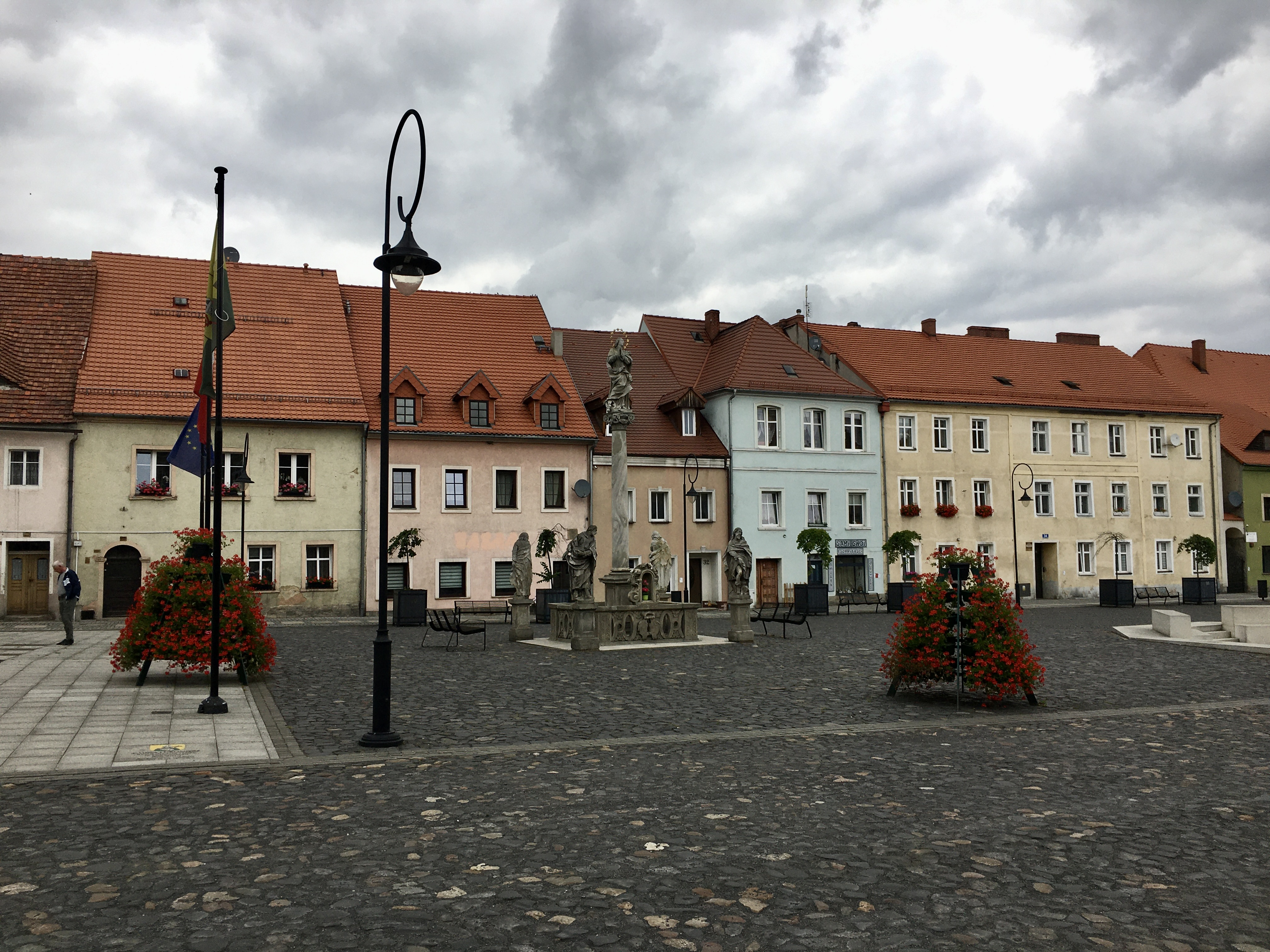
Plac Wolności (Freedom Square)

It was granted town rights by Duke Bolko I the Strict in 1291, when it was part of fragmented Piast-ruled Poland. Defensive town walls were built that same year. It was a private church town of the monastery of the Benedictine nuns until secularization in 1810. Five annual fairs were held in the town in the late 19th century.

== Demographics ==
Historical population

Year	Pop.	±%
1843	1,602	—
1871	1,852	+15.6%
1880	1,634	−11.8%
1890	1,573	−3.7%
1900	1,573	+0.0%
1910	1,600	+1.7%

Year	Pop.	±%
1925	1,582	−1.1%
1939	1,664	+5.2%
1950	1,285	−22.8%
1960	1,540	+19.8%
2010	1,838	+19.4%

== Notable people ==
- Hieronymus Vietor (ca. 1480–1546/1547), printer and publisher

== Twin towns – sister cities ==
See twin towns of Gmina Lubomierz.
