= Milęcice =

- Village
- Location within Poland
- Coordinates: 51°00′56″N 15°31′39″E
- Country: Poland
- Voivodeship: Lower Silesian
- County: Lwówek
- Gmina: Lubomierz
- Time zone: UTC+1 (CET)
  - Summer (DST): UTC+2 (CEST)

Milęcice [milɛnˈt͡ɕit͡sɛ] is a village in the administrative district of Gmina Lubomierz, within Lwówek County, Lower Silesian Voivodeship, in south-western Poland.

During World War II, in 1945, the Germans established and operated a subcamp of the Gross-Rosen concentration camp in the village, in which 400 men were imprisoned, mostly Jews, but also Poles, French, and Germans, all transported from the Auschwitz concentration camp.
