= Wojciechów, Lwówek County =

Wojciechów
- Village
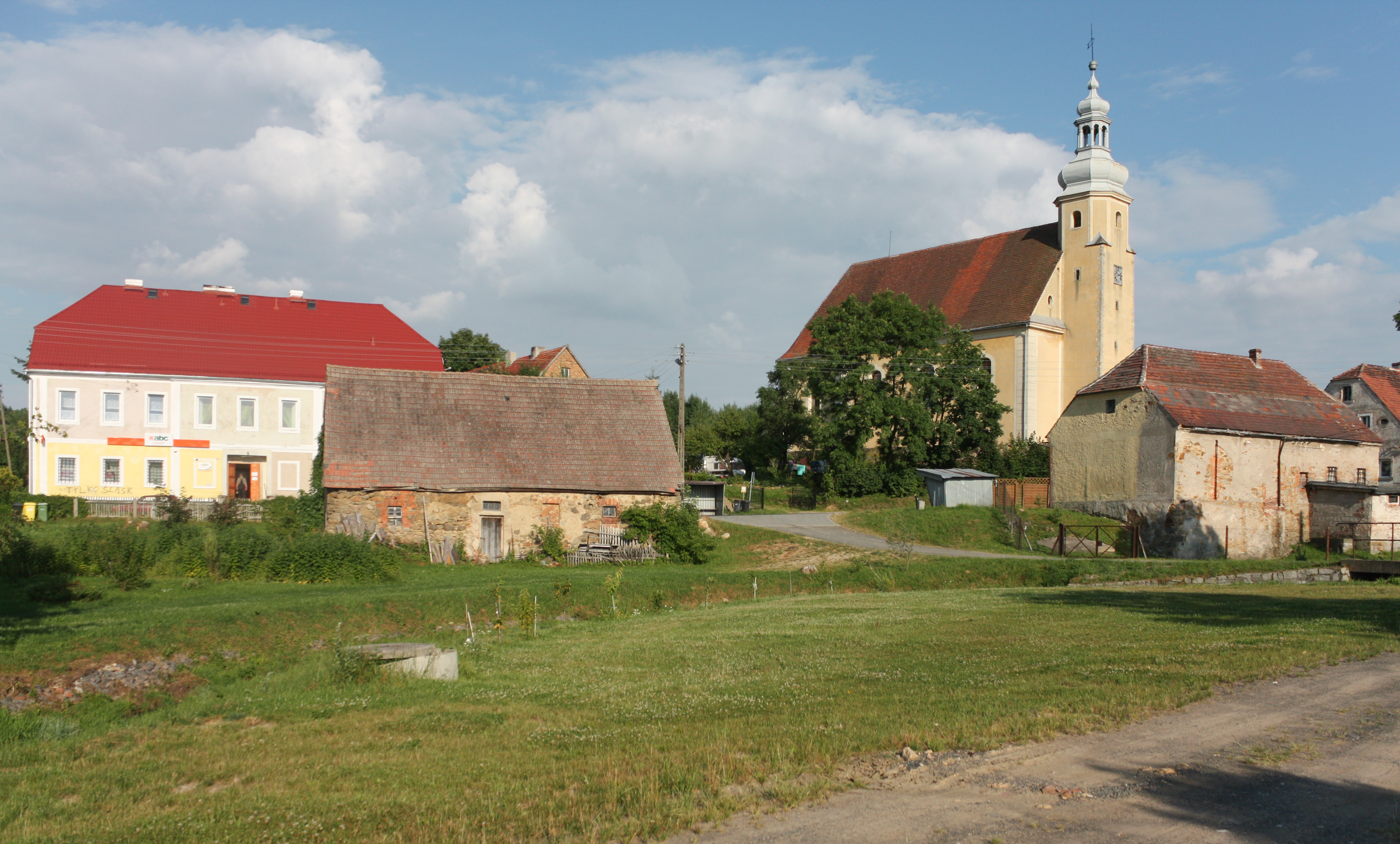

- Location within Poland
- Coordinates: 50°59′50″N 15°33′45″E
- Country: Poland
- Voivodeship: Lower Silesian
- County: Lwówek
- Gmina: Lubomierz

Wojciechów (Polish pronunciation: [vɔjˈt͡ɕɛxuf]) is a village in the administrative district of Gmina Lubomierz, within Lwówek County, Lower Silesian Voivodeship, in south-western Poland.
