= Oleszna Podgórska =

- Village
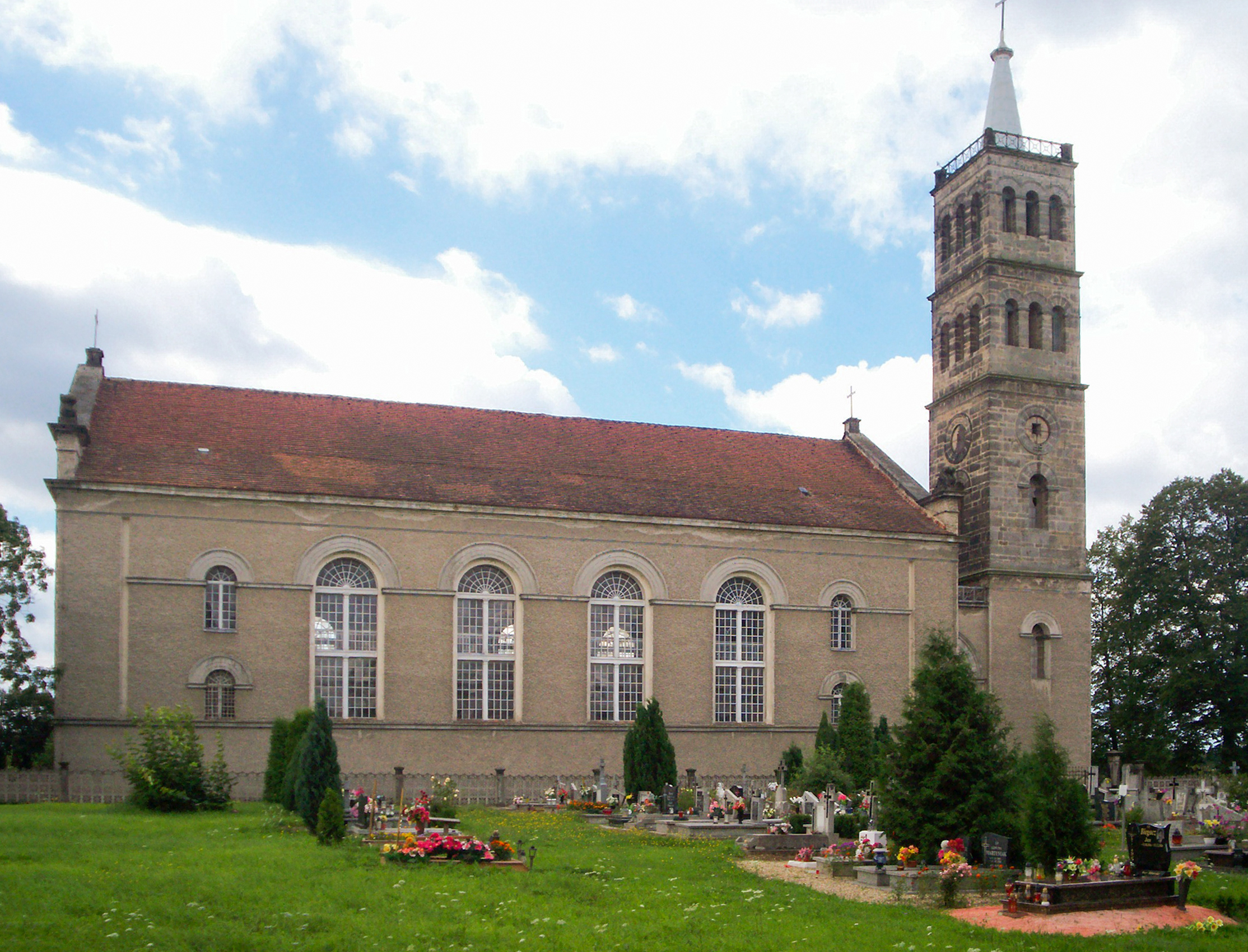
- Church of the Transfiguration of Christ

- Location within Poland
- Coordinates: 51°3′N 15°29′E
- Country: Poland
- Voivodeship: Lower Silesian
- County: Lwówek
- Gmina: Lubomierz

Oleszna Podgórska [ɔˈlɛʂna pɔdˈɡurska] (German: Krummöls) is a village in the administrative district of Gmina Lubomierz, within Lwówek County, Lower Silesian Voivodeship, in south-western Poland.
