= Pławna Górna =

- Village
- Location within Poland
- Coordinates: 51°02′36″N 15°33′50″E
- Country: Poland
- Voivodeship: Lower Silesian
- County: Lwówek
- Gmina: Lubomierz

Population
  - Total: 486
- Postal code: 59-623
- Vehicle registration: DLW

Pławna Górna [ˈpwavna ˈɡurna] is a village in the administrative district of Gmina Lubomierz, within Lwówek County, Lower Silesian Voivodeship, in south-western Poland.

== History ==
During the final stages of World War II, on April 10, 1945, the Germans executed a deserter from the German army in the village.

== Culture ==
In the 18th century house that belonged to Dietrich family before the World War II is a Muzeum Przesiedleńców i Wypędzonych. It is a museum dedicated to people who were resettled from east Poland into this village after the war.
