= Pasiecznik, Lower Silesian Voivodeship =

Pasiecznik
- Village
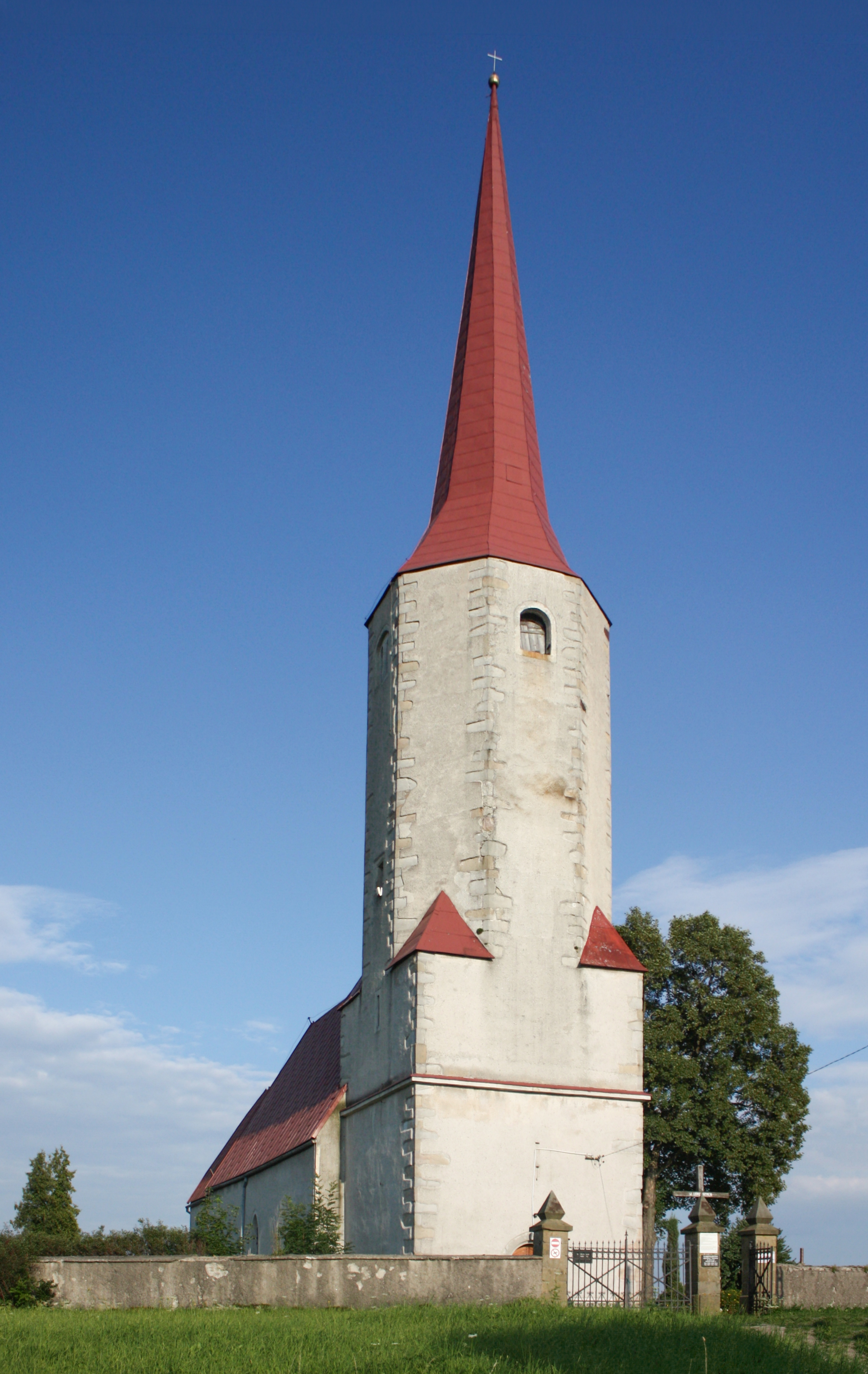
- Church of Saint Michael Archangel in Pasiecznik

- Location within Poland
- Coordinates: 50°55′N 15°35′E
- Country: Poland
- Voivodeship: Lower Silesian
- County: Lwówek
- Gmina: Lubomierz

Population
  - Total: 584
- Time zone: UTC+1 (CET)
  - Summer (DST): UTC+2 (CEST)
- Vehicle registration: DLW

Pasiecznik [paˈɕɛt͡ʂnik] is a village in the administrative district of Gmina Lubomierz, within Lwówek County, Lower Silesian Voivodeship, in south-western Poland. The German name for it was Spiller.

A minor trade route passed through the village in the late medieval and early modern periods, connecting Wrocław, Bolków and Jelenia Góra with Gryfów, Lubań and Zgorzelec.
