= Haselbach =

Haselbach may refer to:

== Inhabited places ==
- Haselbach, Bavaria, a municipality in the district of Straubing-Bogen in Bavaria, Germany
- Haselbach, Thuringia, a municipality in the district Altenburger Land, in Thuringia, Germany
- Haselbach bei Gurkfeld, a settlement on the Sava River in Slovenia
- Leszczyniec, German name Haselbach, a village in Lower Silesian Voivodeship, Poland

== Rivers ==
- Haselbach (Günz), a tributary of the Günz, Bavaria, Germany
- Haselbach (Kammel), a tributary of the Kammel, Bavaria, Germany
- Haselbach (Fulda), a right tributary of the Fulda, Hesse, Germany
- Hasel (Orb), other name Haselbach, a tributary of the Orb, Hesse, Germany
- Haselbach (Pulsnitz), a tributary of the Pulsnitz, Saxony, Germany
- Haselbach (Schwarza), the uppermost course of the Schwarza, a tributary of the Hasel, Thuringia, Germany

== Other uses ==
- Anna Elisabeth Haselbach (born 1942), Austrian politician, president of the Federal Council 1991, 1995, 2000, and 2004
