= Szarocin =

- Village
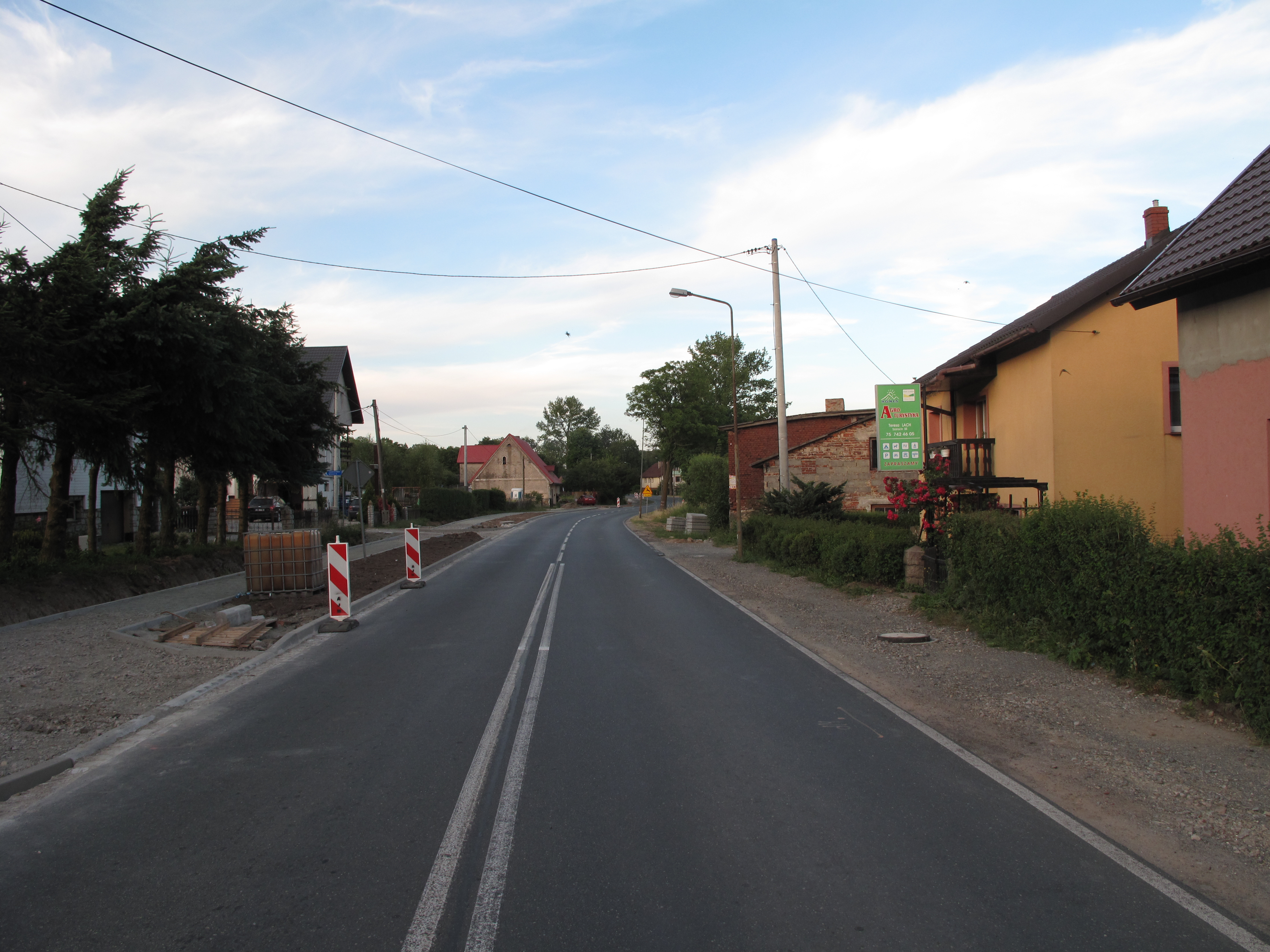
- Main road

- Location within Poland
- Coordinates: 50°46′16″N 15°55′20″E
- Country: Poland
- Voivodeship: Lower Silesian
- County: Kamienna Góra
- Gmina: Kamienna Góra

Szarocin [ʂaˈrɔt͡ɕin] is a village in the administrative district of Gmina Kamienna Góra, within Kamienna Góra County, Lower Silesian Voivodeship, in south-western Poland.

== Gallery ==
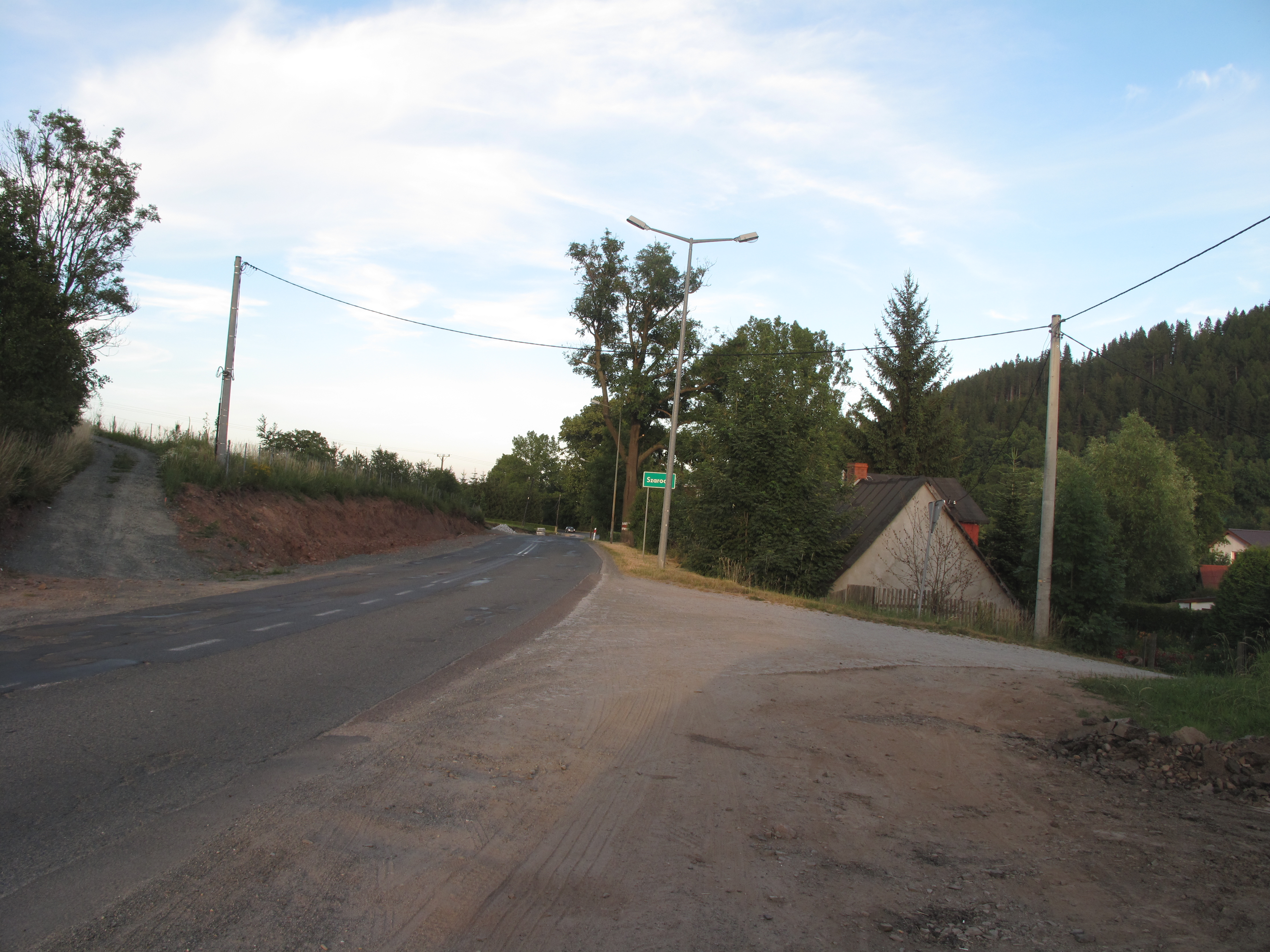
Cross roads

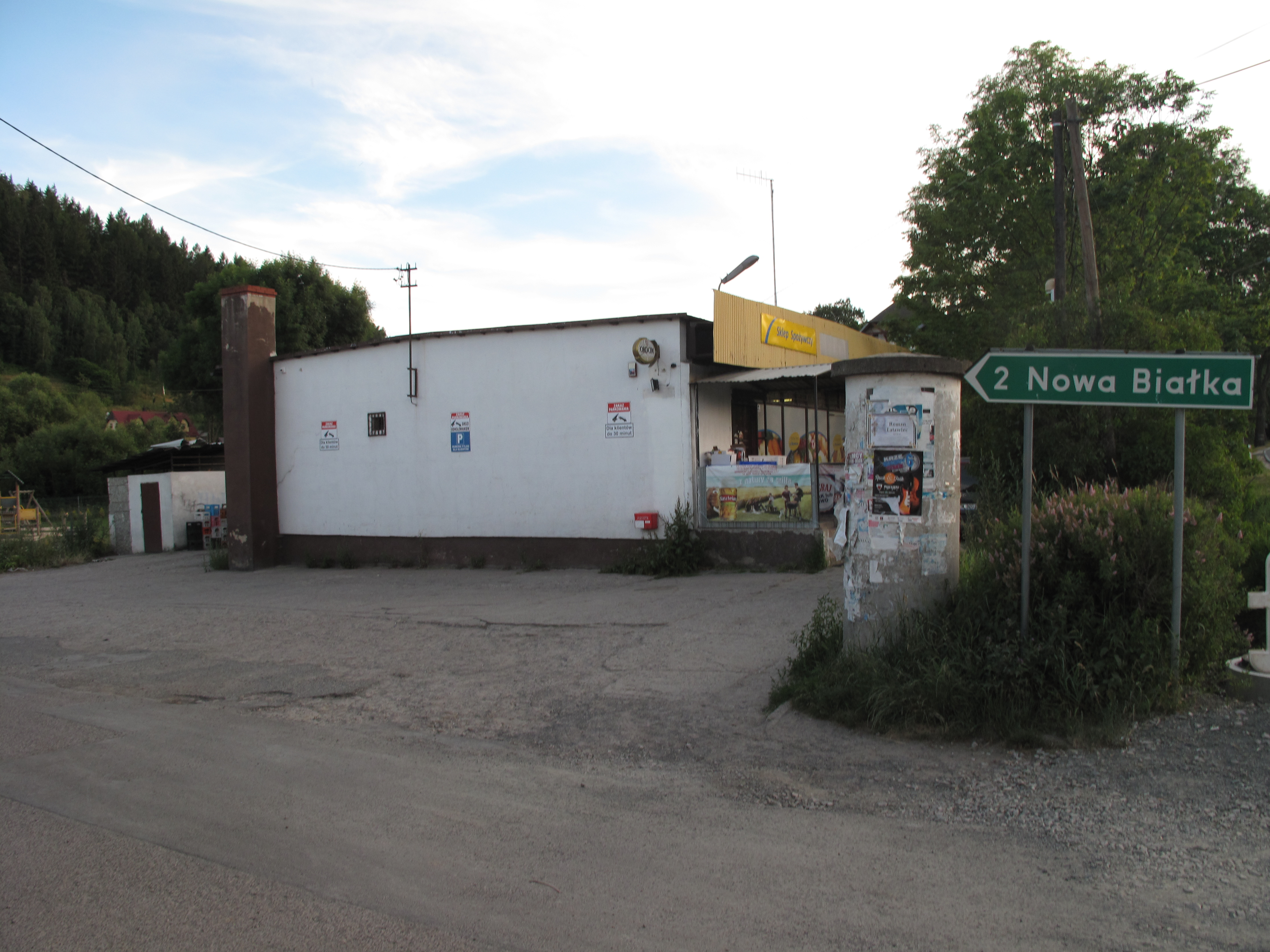
Shop

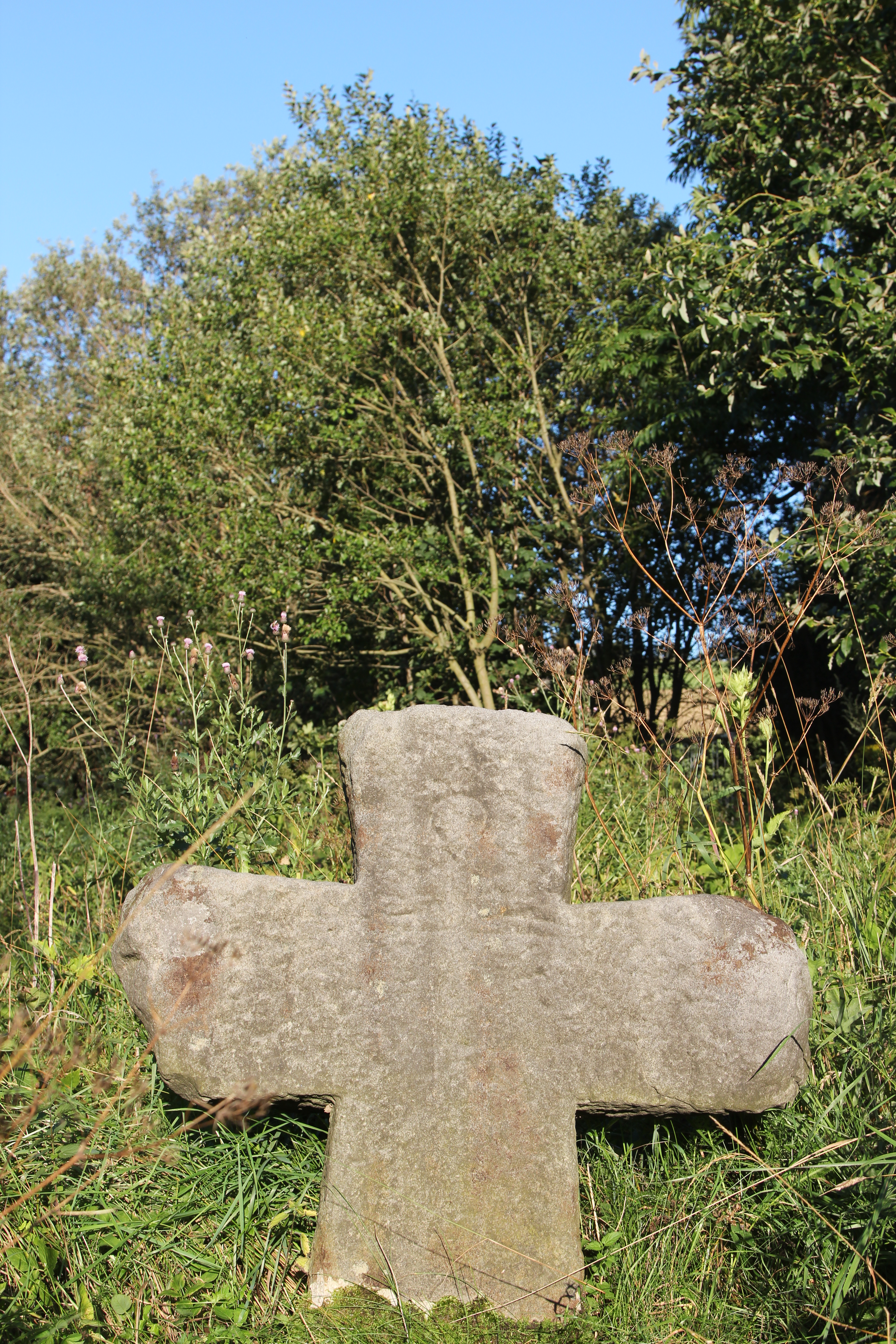
Wayside cross
