= Krzeszówek =

- Village
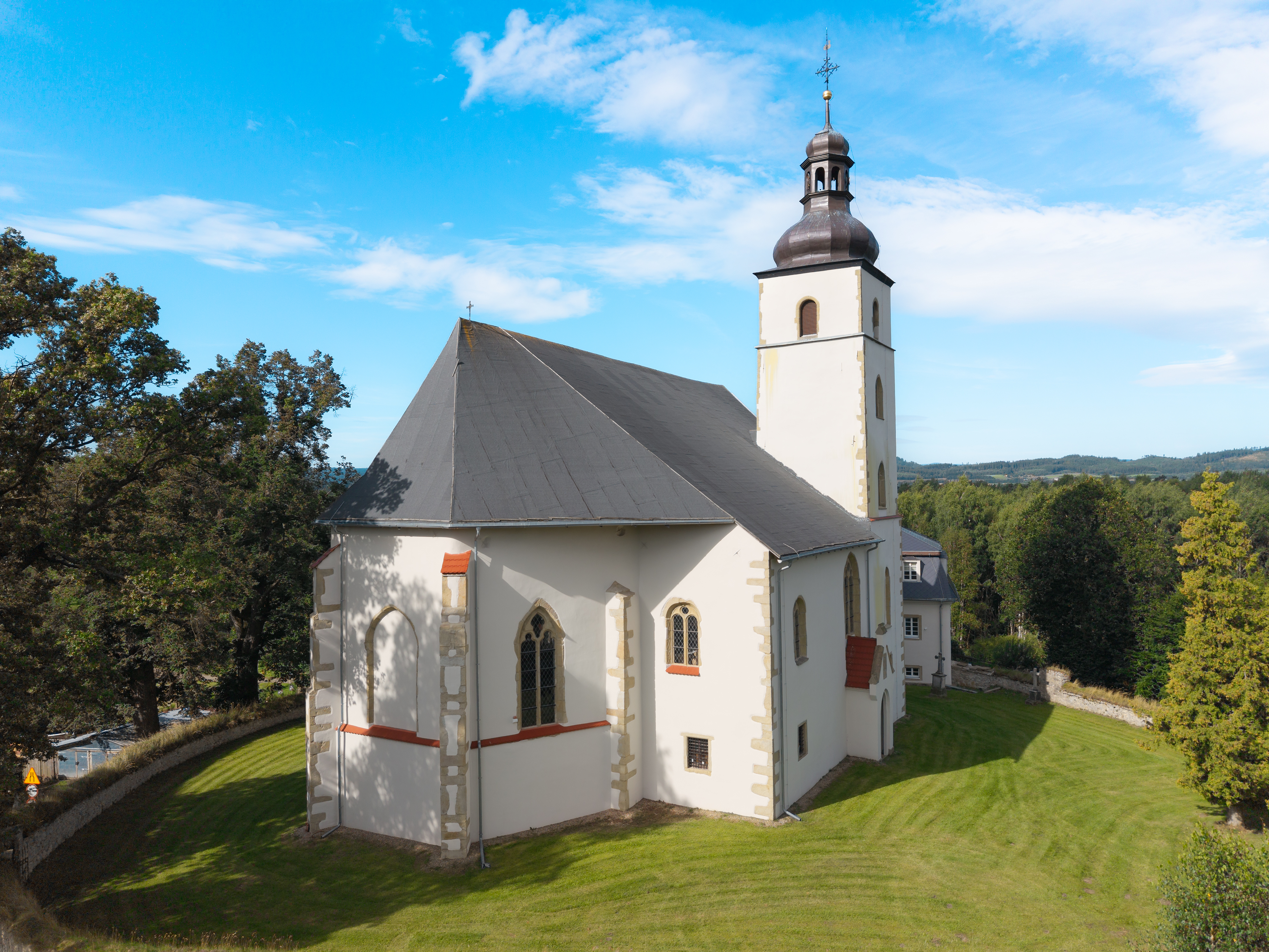
- Church in Krzeszówek

- Location within Poland
- Coordinates: 50°43′02″N 16°05′29″E
- Country: Poland
- Voivodeship: Lower Silesian
- County: Kamienna Góra
- Gmina: Kamienna Góra

Krzeszówek [kʂɛˈʂuvɛk] is a village in the administrative district of Gmina Kamienna Góra, within Kamienna Góra County, Lower Silesian Voivodeship, in south-western Poland.
