= Reußendorf =

Reußendorf may refer to:

- a family line of the Bohemian branch established by Anton of the House of Schaffgotsch
- the former German name for Raszów, Poland
- the former German name for Rusinowa, Poland
