= Gorzeszów =

- Village
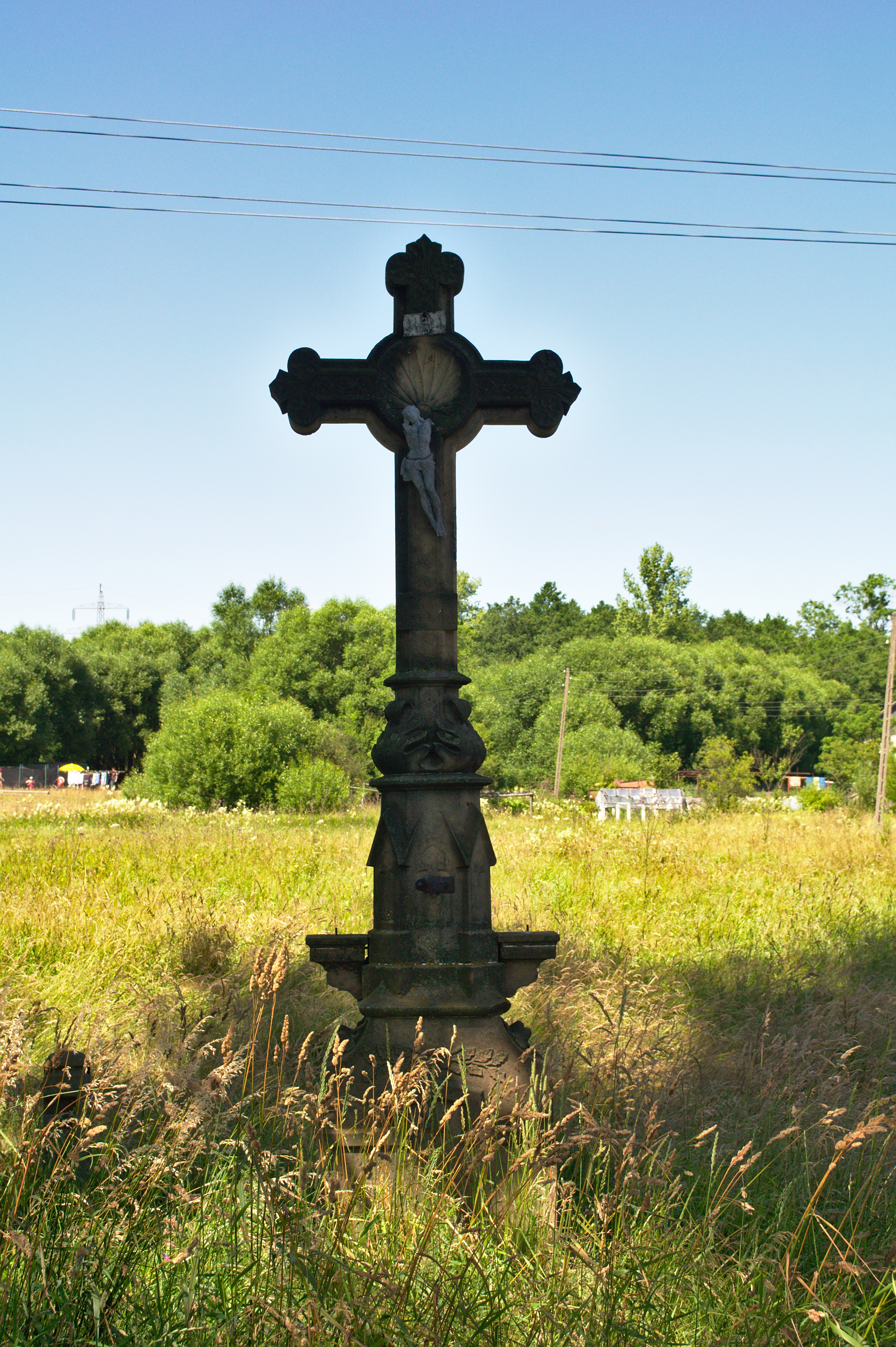
- Wayside cross in Gorzeszów

- Location within Poland
- Coordinates: 50°42′18″N 16°06′45″E
- Country: Poland
- Voivodeship: Lower Silesian
- County: Kamienna Góra
- Gmina: Kamienna Góra

Population
  - Total: 260
- Time zone: UTC+1 (CET)
  - Summer (DST): UTC+2 (CEST)
- Vehicle registration: DKA

Gorzeszów [ɡɔˈʐɛʂuf] is a village in the administrative district of Gmina Kamienna Góra, within Kamienna Góra County, Lower Silesian Voivodeship, in south-western Poland. It is situated in the Kamienna Góra Valley in the Central Sudetes.

The Nature reserve Głazy Krasnoludków ("Dwarf Boulders") is located near the village.

== History ==
The village was founded before 1289 within fragmented Piast-ruled Poland. After World War II, in 1945–1947, Poles expelled from Wiśniowce in pre-war south-eastern Poland annexed by the Soviet Union settled in Gorzeszów. An agricultural cooperative was founded in the village in 1951.
