= Dobromyśl, Lower Silesian Voivodeship =

Dobromyśl
- Village
- Location within Poland
- Coordinates: 50°41′35″N 16°07′37″E
- Country: Poland
- Voivodeship: Lower Silesian
- County: Kamienna Góra
- Gmina: Kamienna Góra
- First mentioned: 1289
- Time zone: UTC+1 (CET)
  - Summer (DST): UTC+2 (CEST)
- Vehicle registration: DKA

Dobromyśl [dɔˈbrɔmɨɕl] is a village in the administrative district of Gmina Kamienna Góra, within Kamienna Góra County, Lower Silesian Voivodeship, in south-western Poland.

== History ==
The village was first mentioned in 1289, when it was part of fragmented Piast-ruled Poland. After World War II, in 1945–1947, Poles expelled from Wiśniowce in pre-war south-eastern Poland annexed by the Soviet Union settled in the village.
