= Ptaszków =

- Village
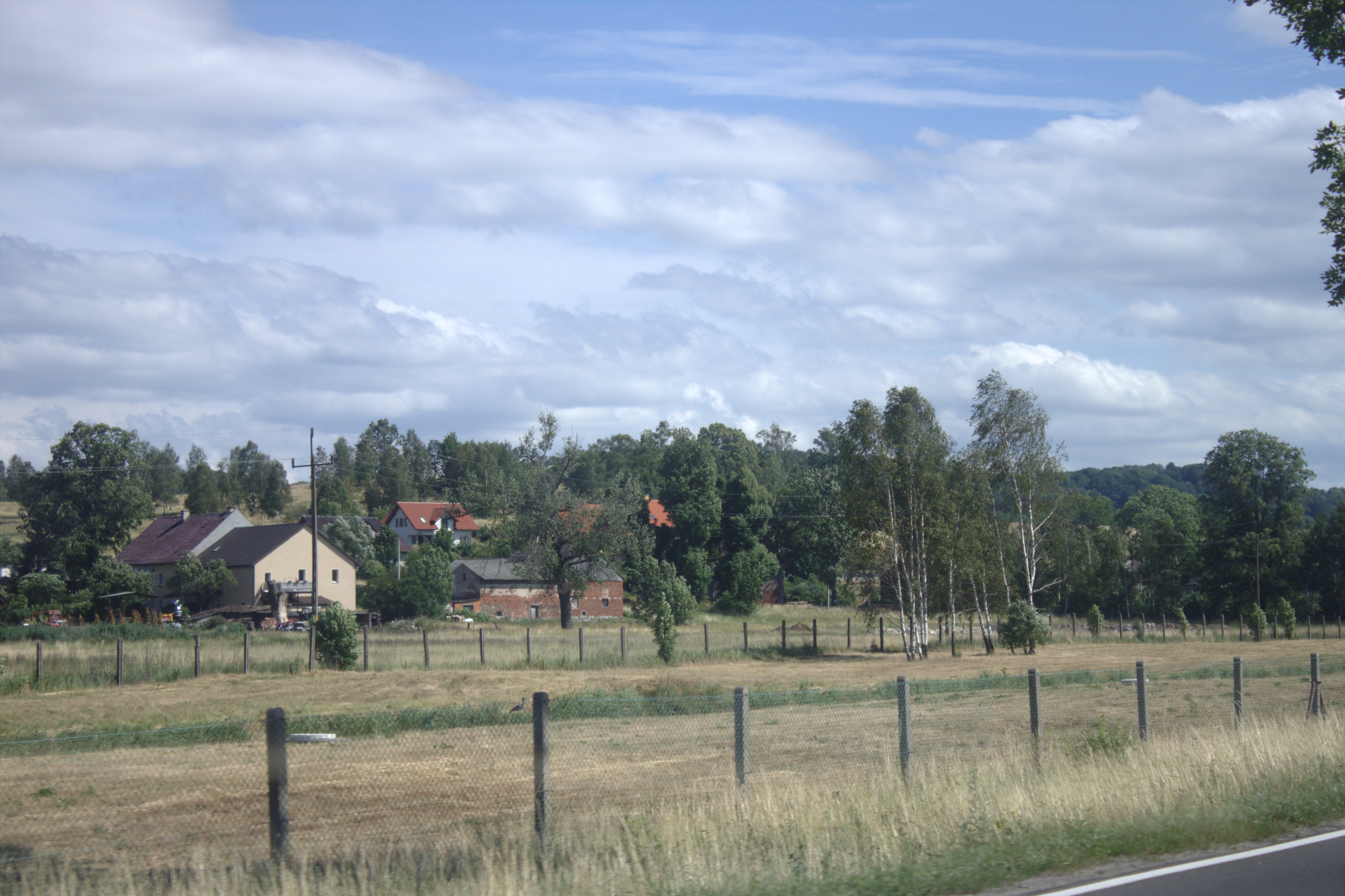
- Houses from the distance

- Location within Poland
- Coordinates: 50°47′45″N 16°02′38″E
- Country: Poland
- Voivodeship: Lower Silesian
- County: Kamienna Góra
- Gmina: Kamienna Góra

Ptaszków [ˈptaʂkuf] is a village in the administrative district of Gmina Kamienna Góra, within Kamienna Góra County, Lower Silesian Voivodeship, in south-western Poland.

== Gallery ==
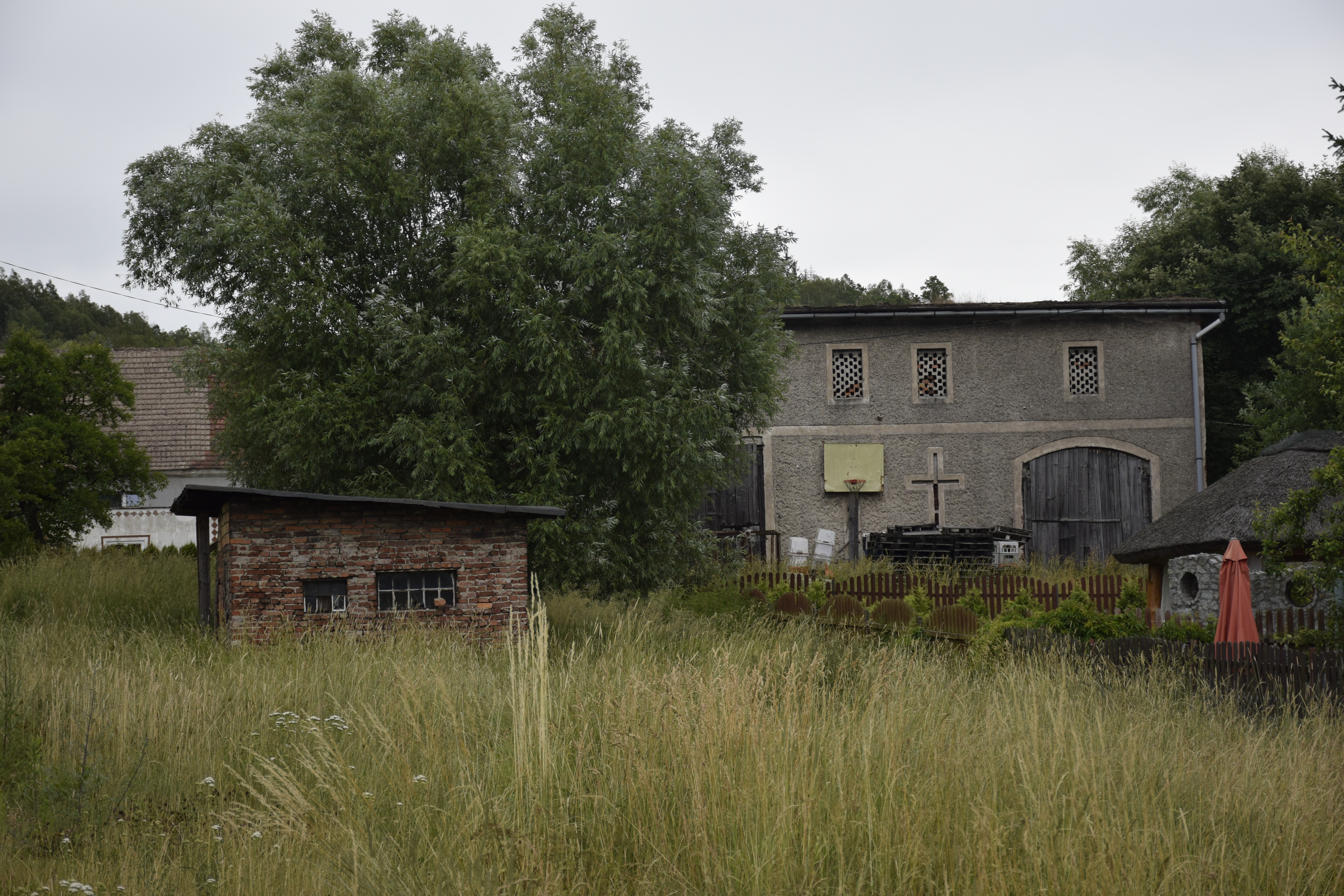
House with cross on it

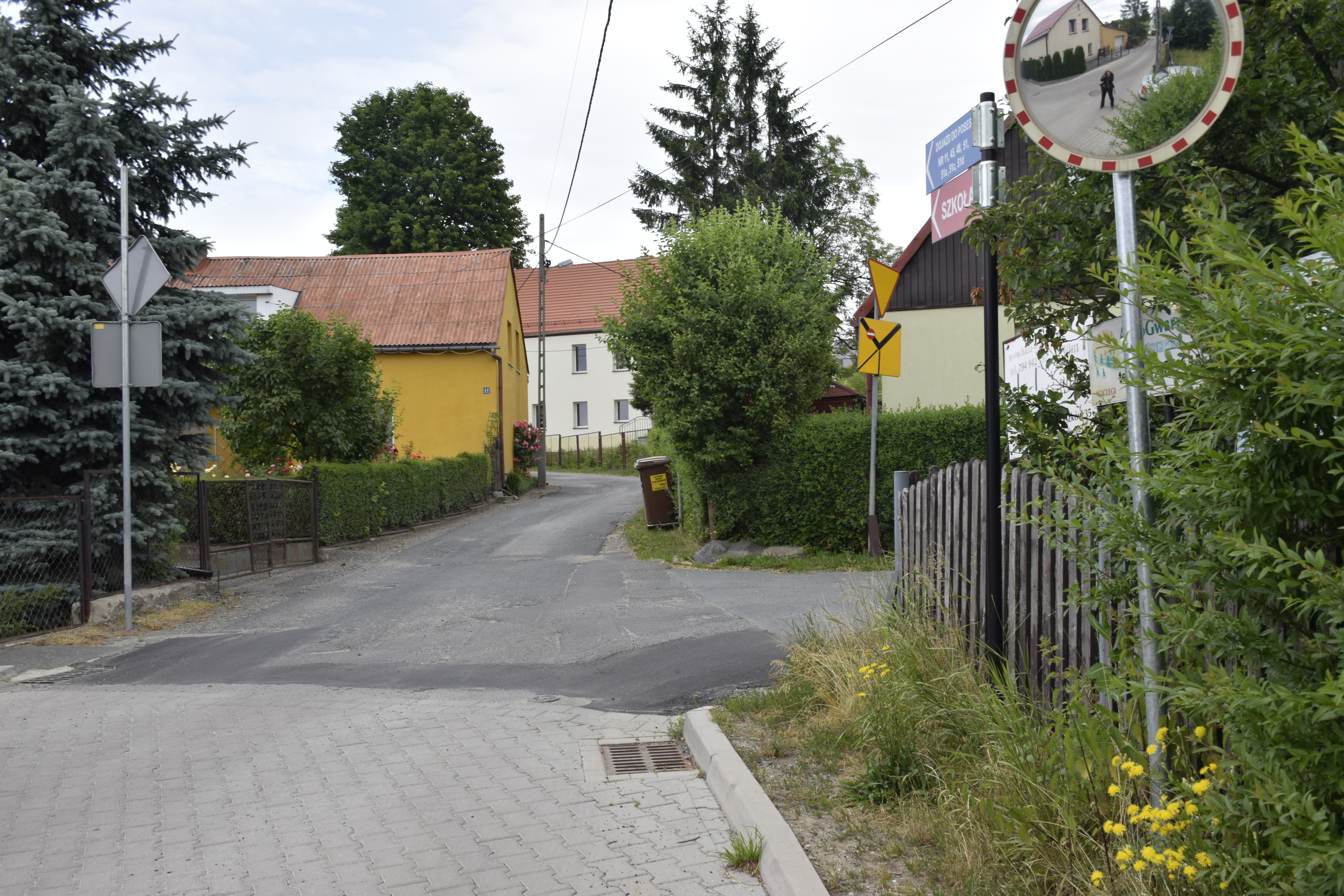
Street

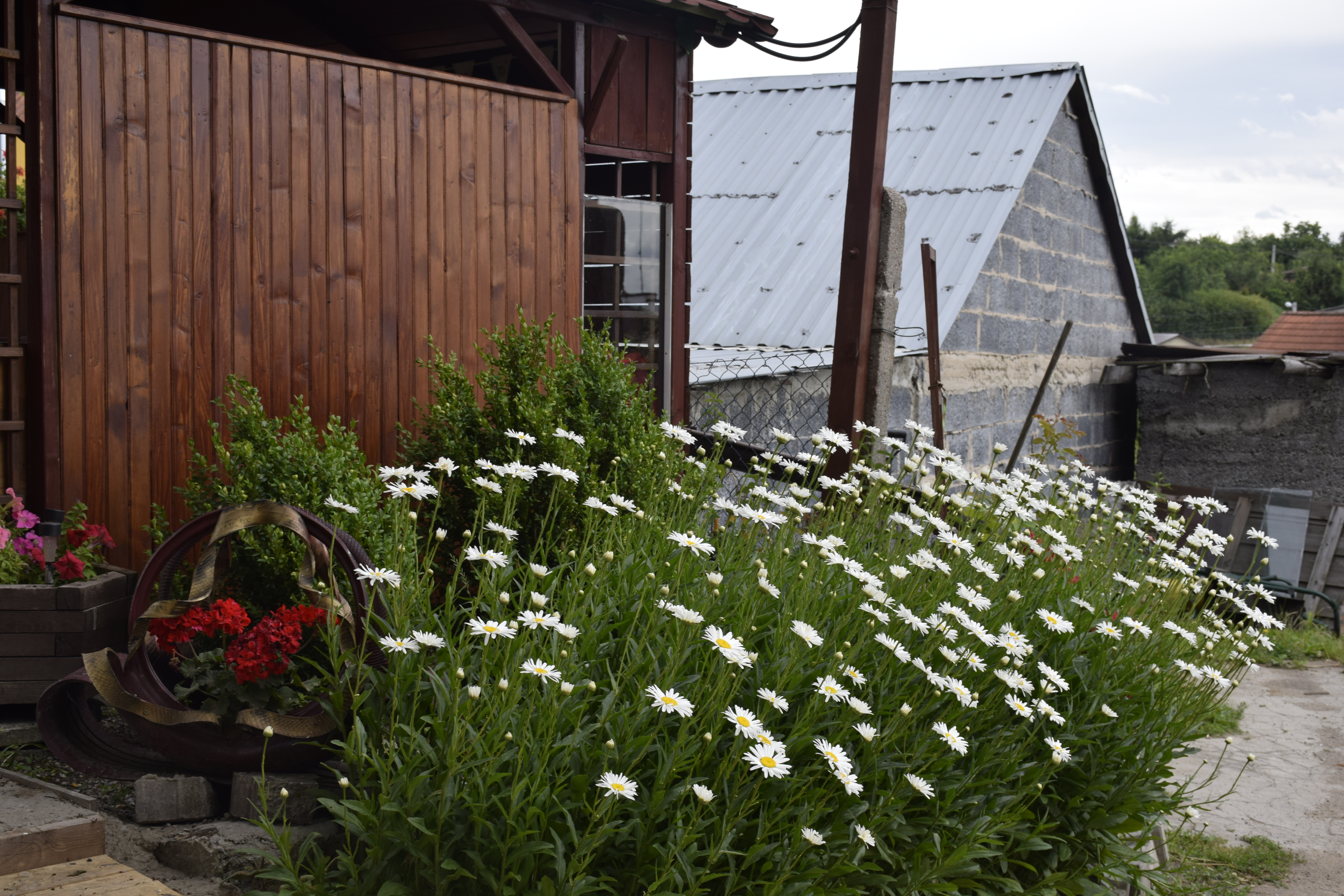
Flowers
