= Czadrów =

- Village
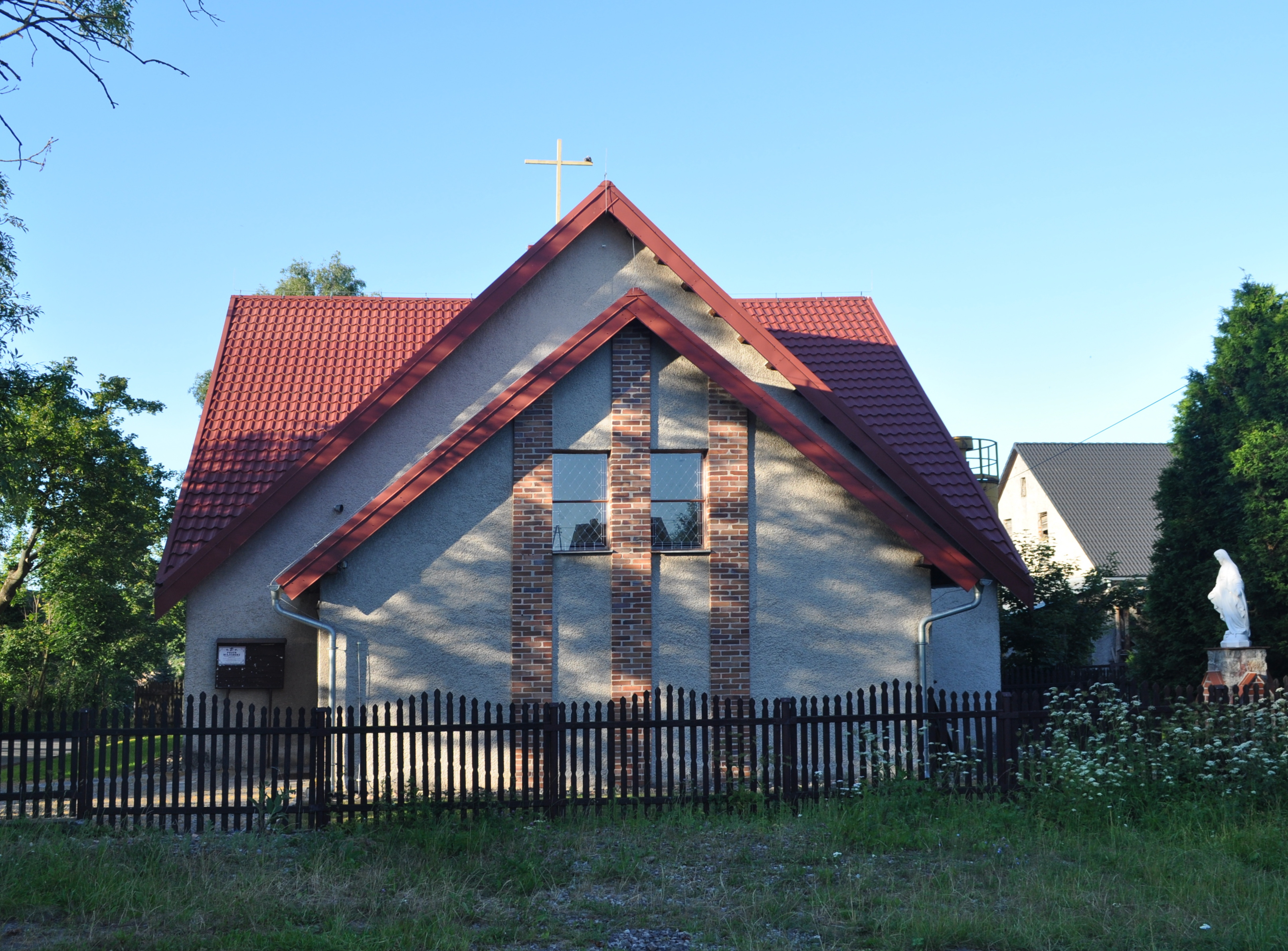

- Location within Poland
- Coordinates: 50°45′51″N 16°03′41″E
- Country: Poland
- Voivodeship: Lower Silesian
- County: Kamienna Góra
- Gmina: Kamienna Góra
- Population: 720

Czadrów [ˈt͡ʂadruf] is a village in the administrative district of Gmina Kamienna Góra, within Kamienna Góra County, Lower Silesian Voivodeship, in south-western Poland.
