= Jawiszów =

- Village
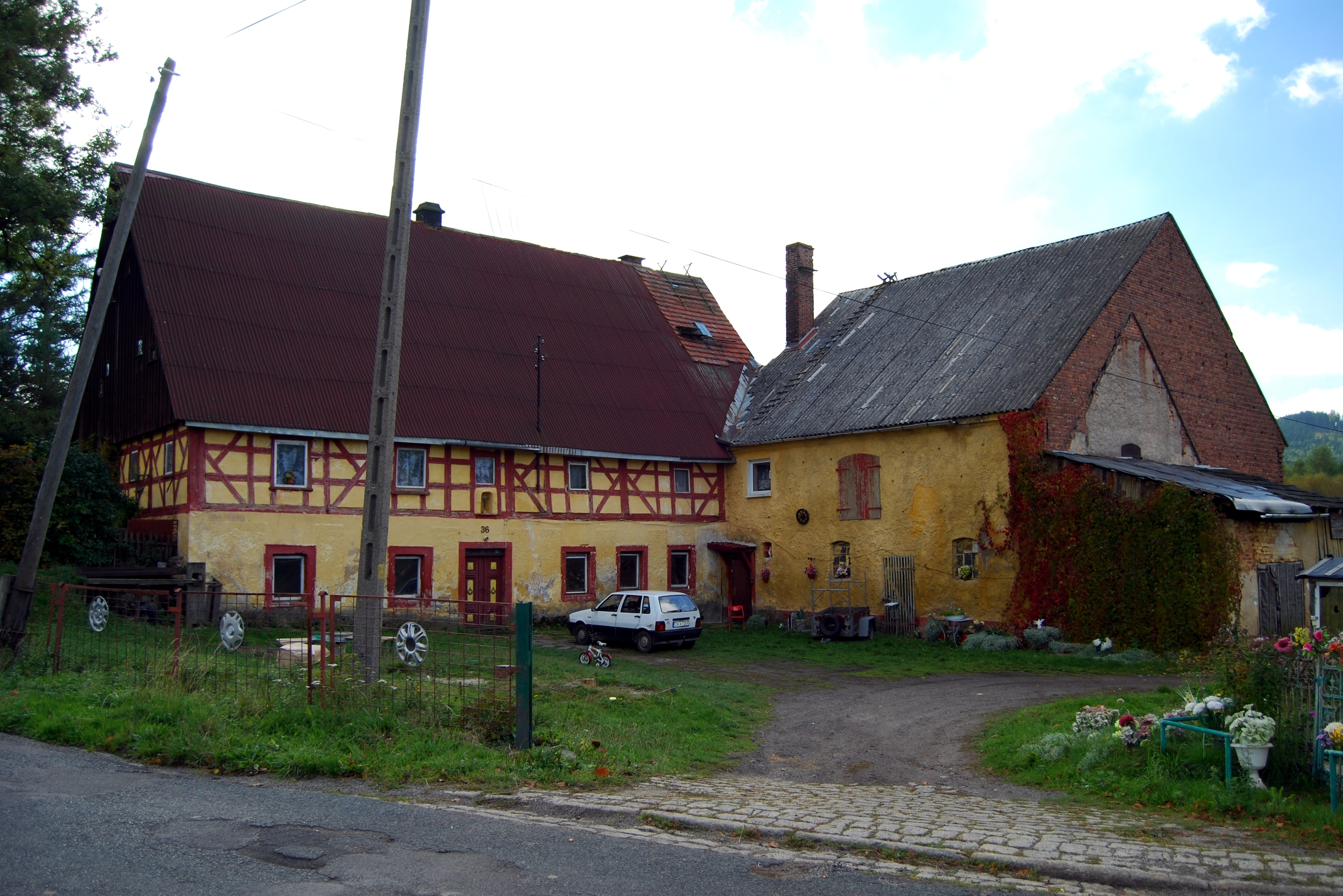

- Location within Poland
- Coordinates: 50°42′40″N 16°04′25″E
- Country: Poland
- Voivodeship: Lower Silesian
- County: Kamienna Góra
- Gmina: Kamienna Góra

Jawiszów [jaˈviʂuf] is a village in the administrative district of Gmina Kamienna Góra, within Kamienna Góra County, Lower Silesian Voivodeship, in south-western Poland.
