= Ogorzelec, Kamienna Góra County =

Ogorzelec
- Village
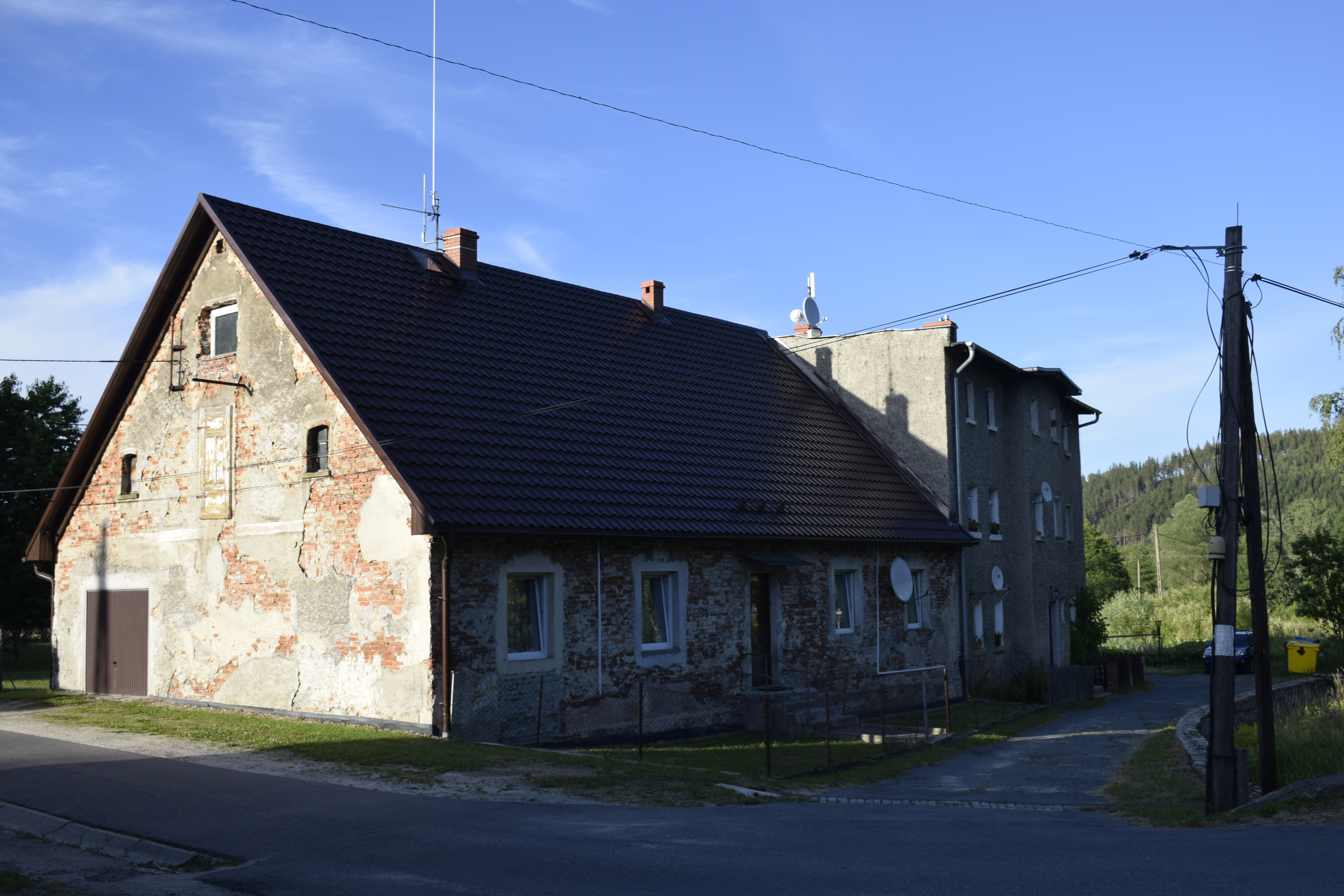
- Houses in Ogorzelec

- Location within Poland
- Coordinates: 50°46′N 15°53′E
- Country: Poland
- Voivodeship: Lower Silesian
- County: Kamienna Góra
- Gmina: Kamienna Góra

Ogorzelec [ɔɡɔˈʐɛlɛt͡s] is a village in the administrative district of Gmina Kamienna Góra, within Kamienna Góra County, Lower Silesian Voivodeship, in south-western Poland.

In the years 1975-1998 the village was a region of Jelenia Góra.

== Gallery ==
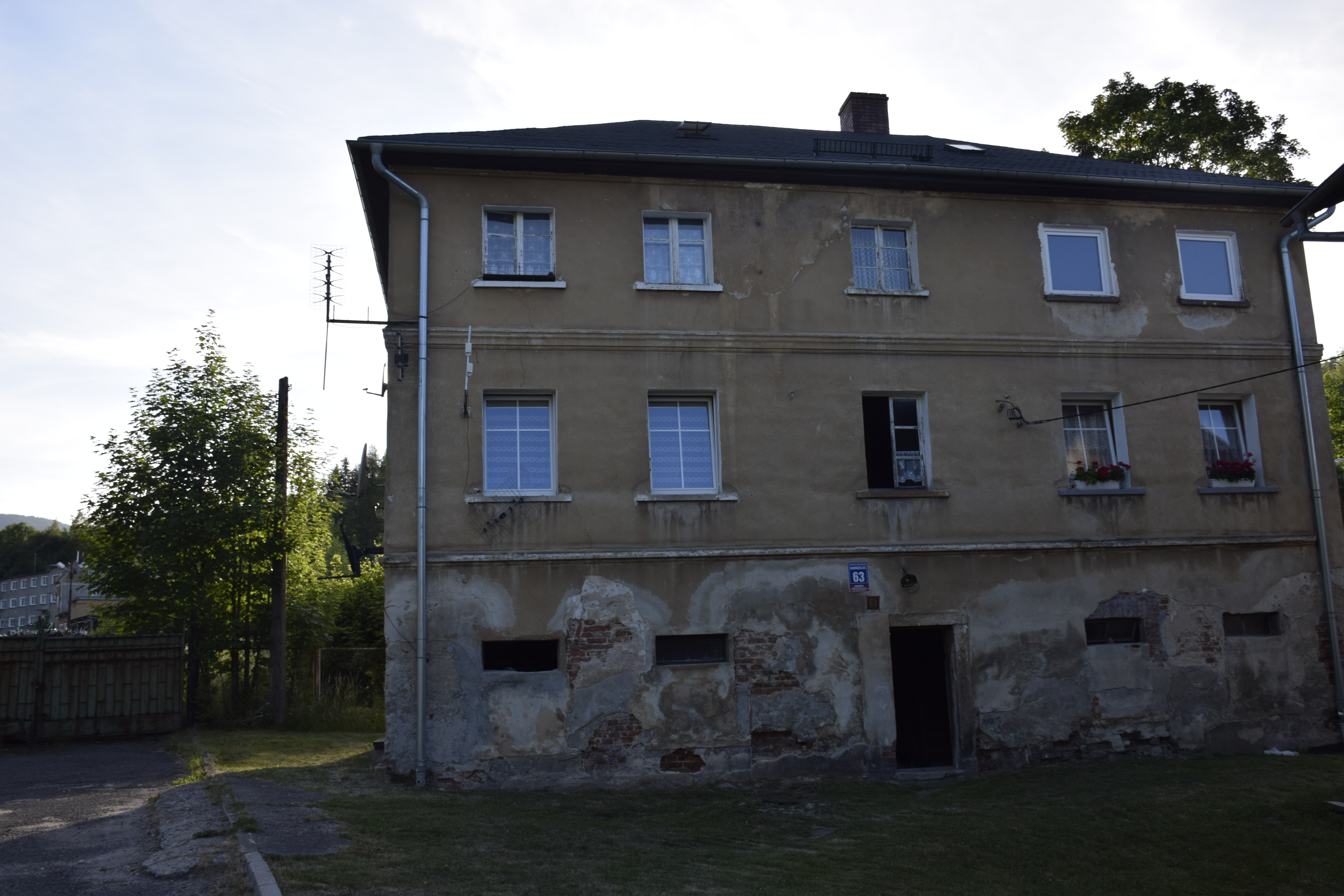
House

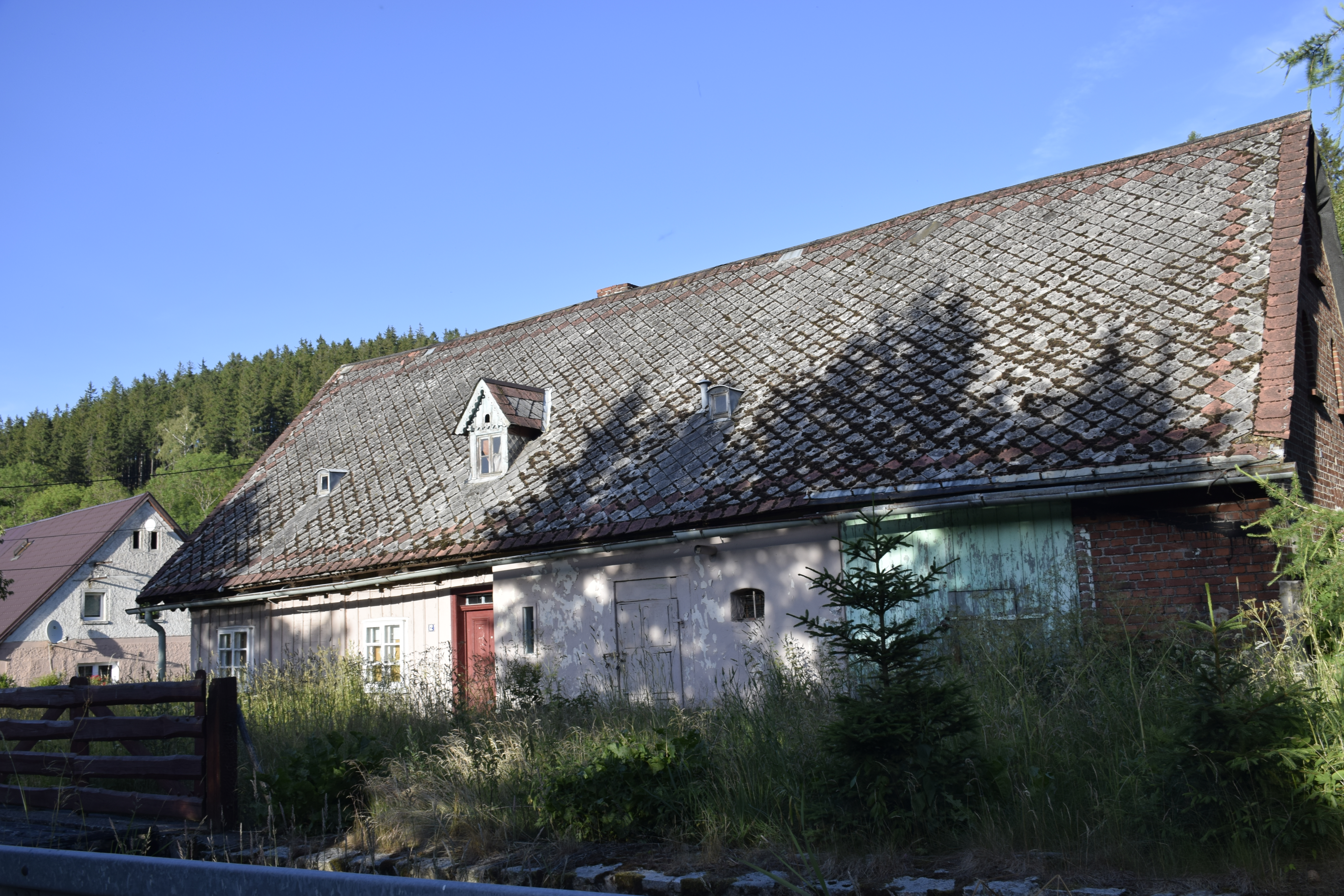
Old house by the road

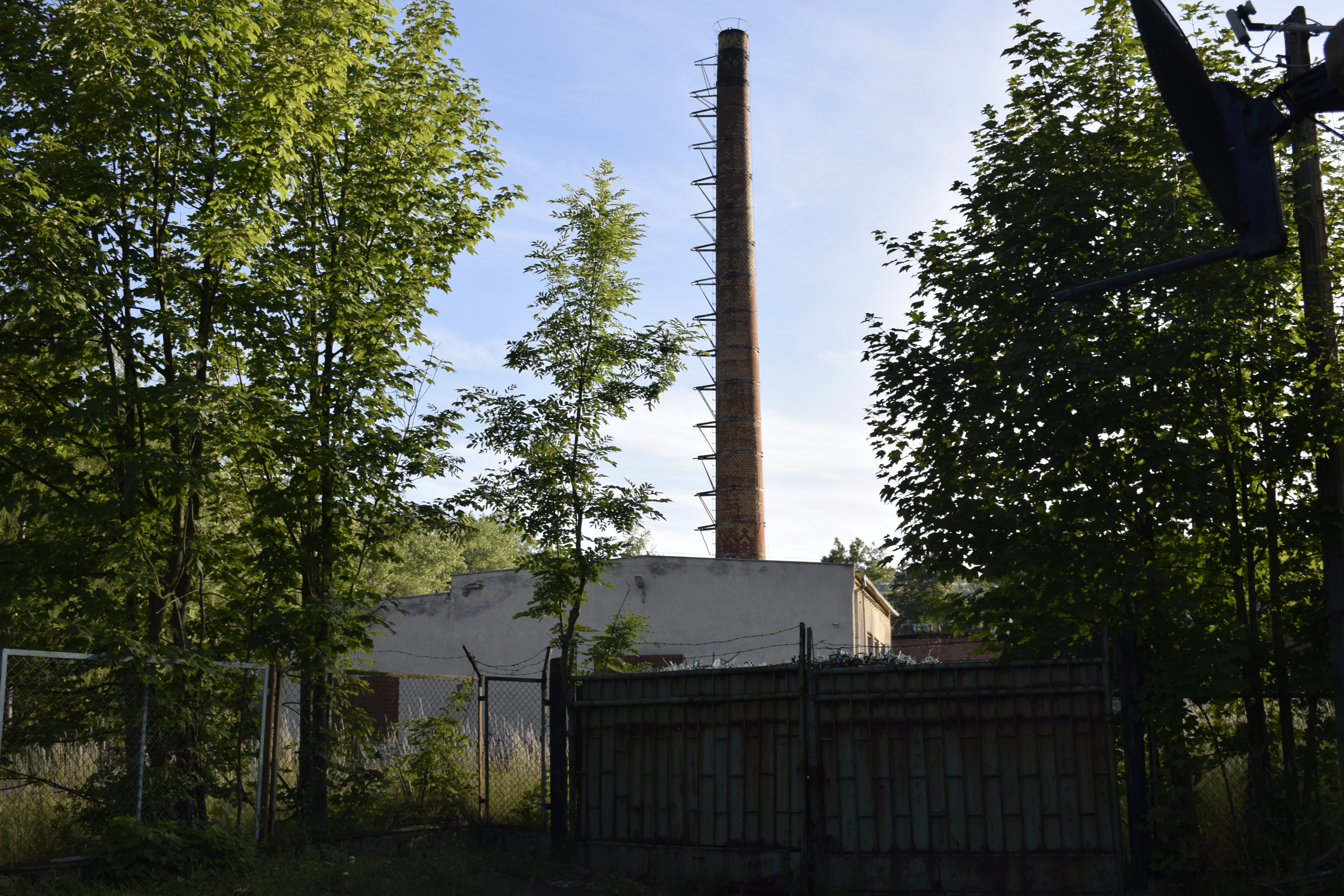
Factory on the edge of the village
