= Pisarzowice, Kamienna Góra County =

Pisarzowice
- Village
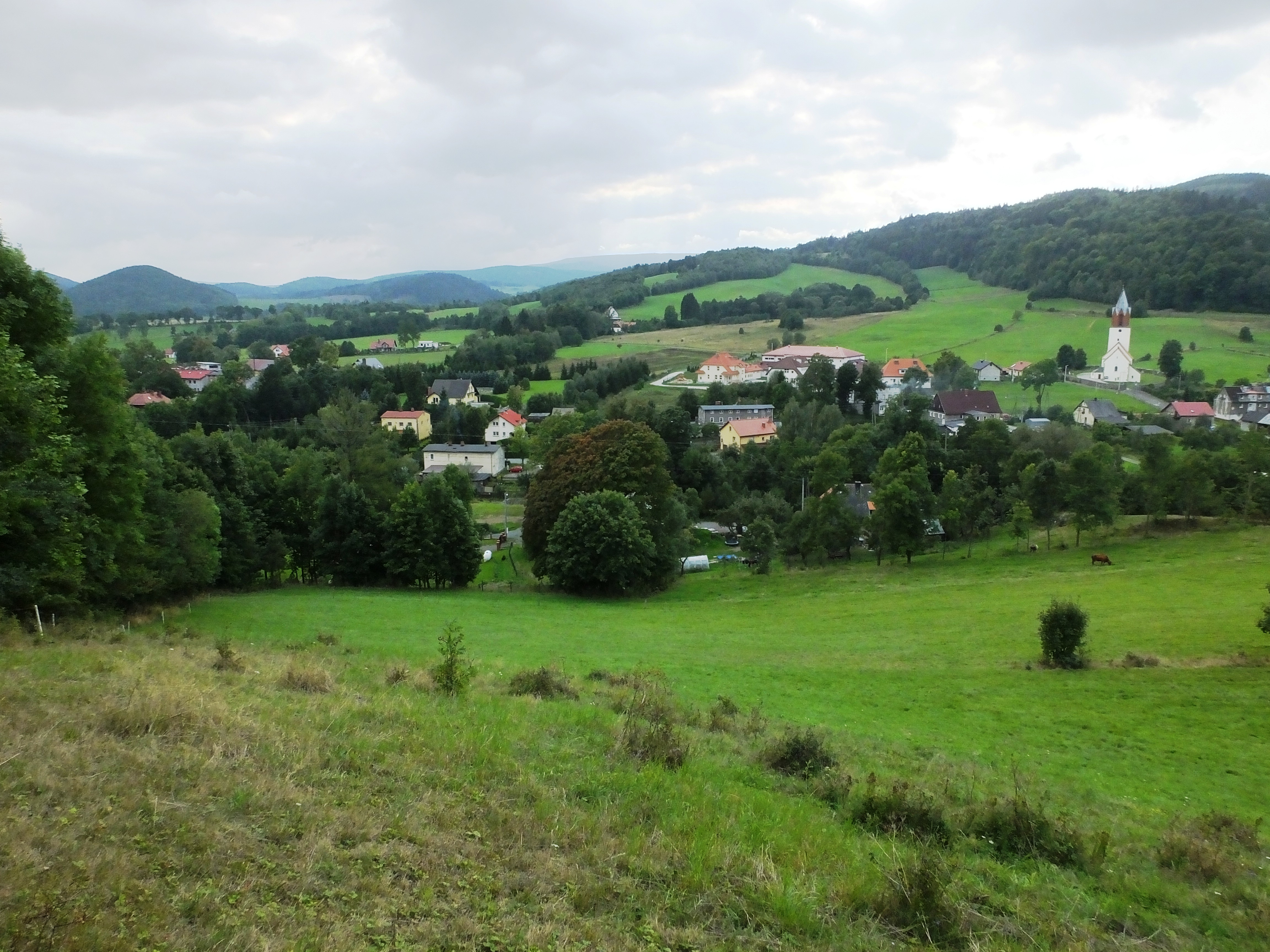

- Location within Poland
- Coordinates: 50°47′27″N 15°57′04″E
- Country: Poland
- Voivodeship: Lower Silesian
- County: Kamienna Góra
- Gmina: Kamienna Góra
- Time zone: UTC+1 (CET)
  - Summer (DST): UTC+2 (CEST)
- Vehicle registration: DKA

Pisarzowice [pisaʐɔˈvit͡sɛ] is a village in the administrative district of Gmina Kamienna Góra, within Kamienna Góra County, Lower Silesian Voivodeship, in south-western Poland.

In 1945, demobilized Polish lieutenant Czesław Słania settled in Pisarzowice, however, he soon left for Kraków, and eventually became one of the world's most skilled and prolific stamp engravers.

An agricultural cooperative was founded in Pisarzowice in 1951.
