= Rędziny, Lower Silesian Voivodeship =

Rędziny
- Village
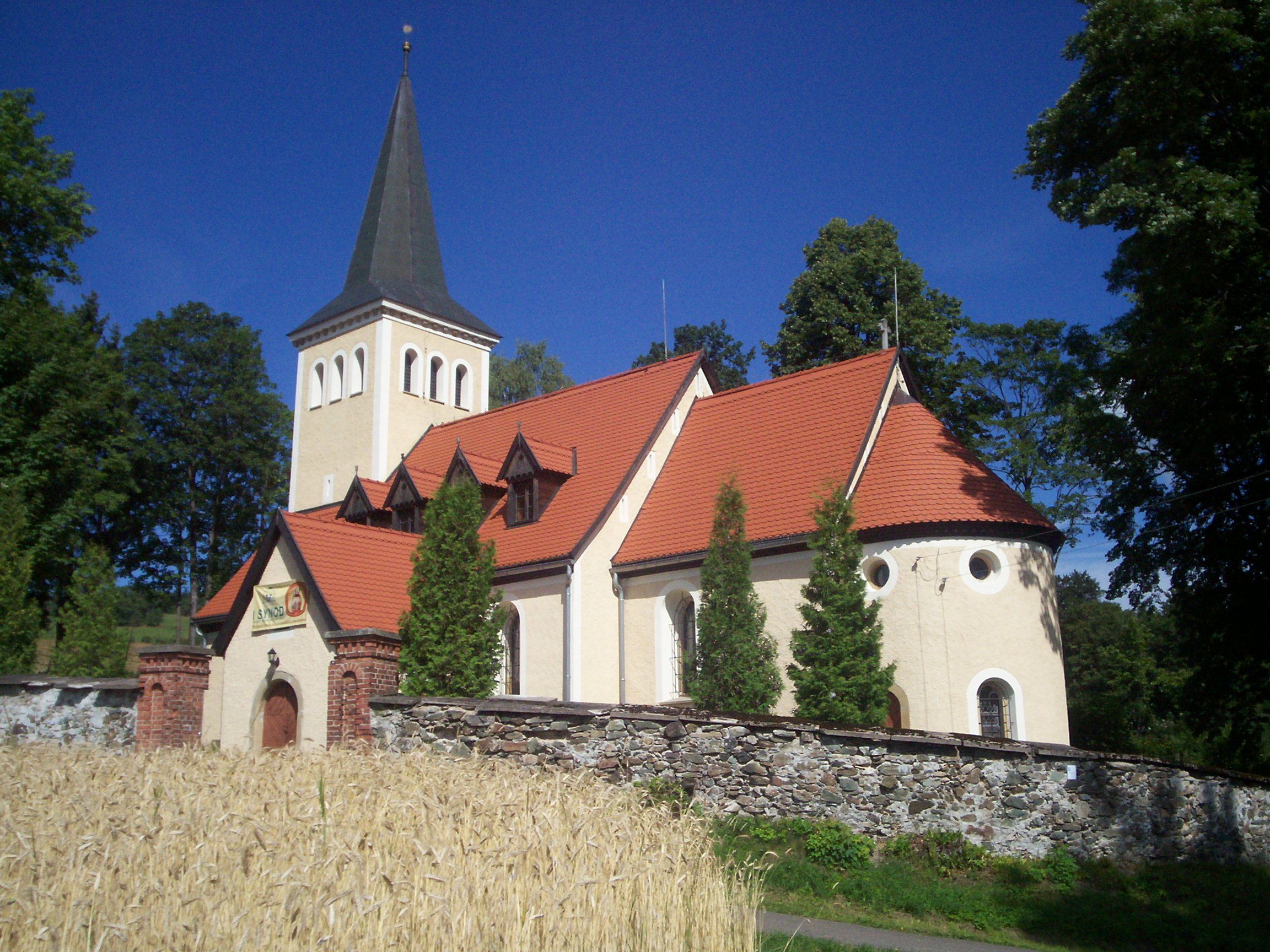

- Location within Poland
- Coordinates: 50°49′01″N 15°56′38″E
- Country: Poland
- Voivodeship: Lower Silesian
- County: Kamienna Góra
- Gmina: Kamienna Góra

Rędziny [rɛnˈd͡ʑinɨ] is a village in the administrative district of Gmina Kamienna Góra, within Kamienna Góra County, Lower Silesian Voivodeship, in south-western Poland.

== Gallery ==
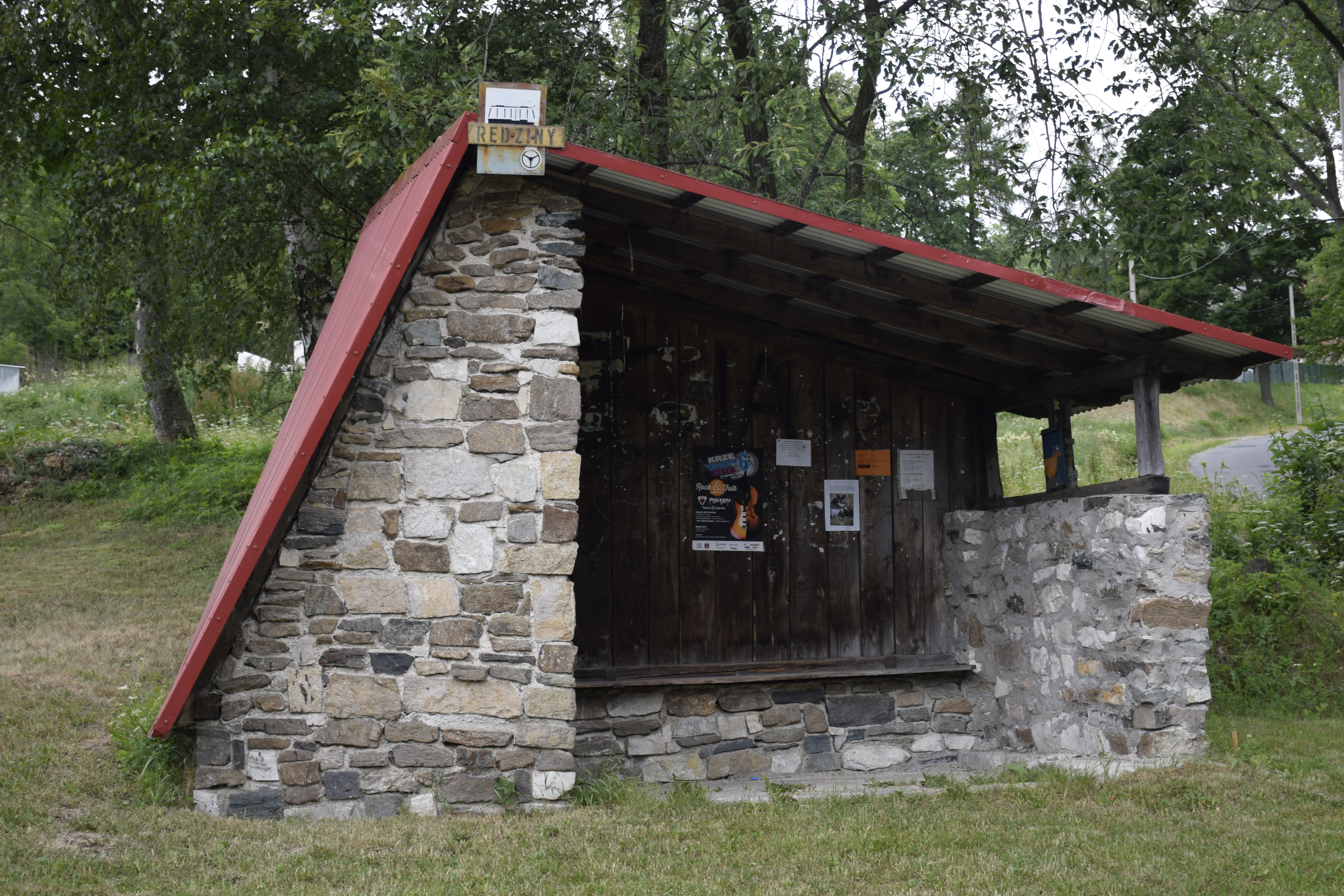
Bus stop shelter

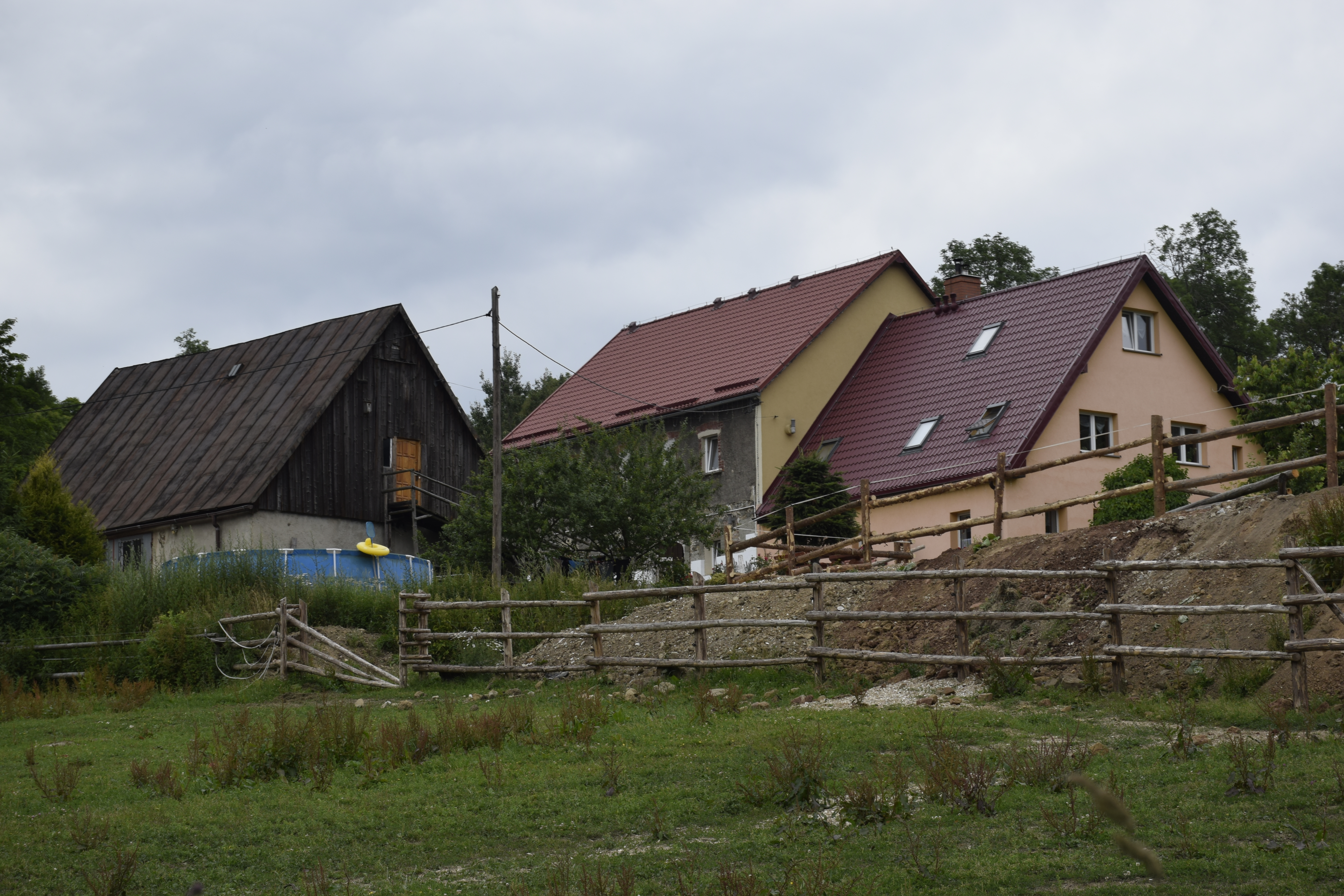
Houses

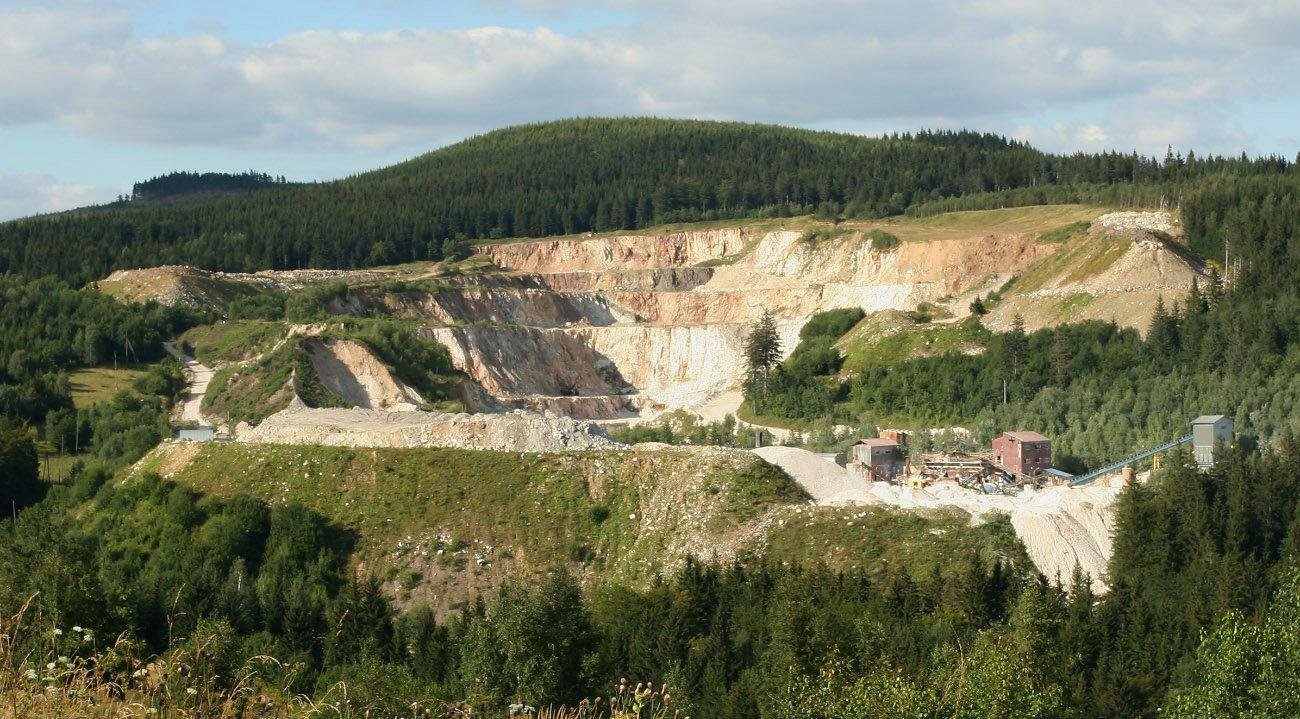
Mine
