= Janiszów, Kamienna Góra County =

Janiszów
- Village
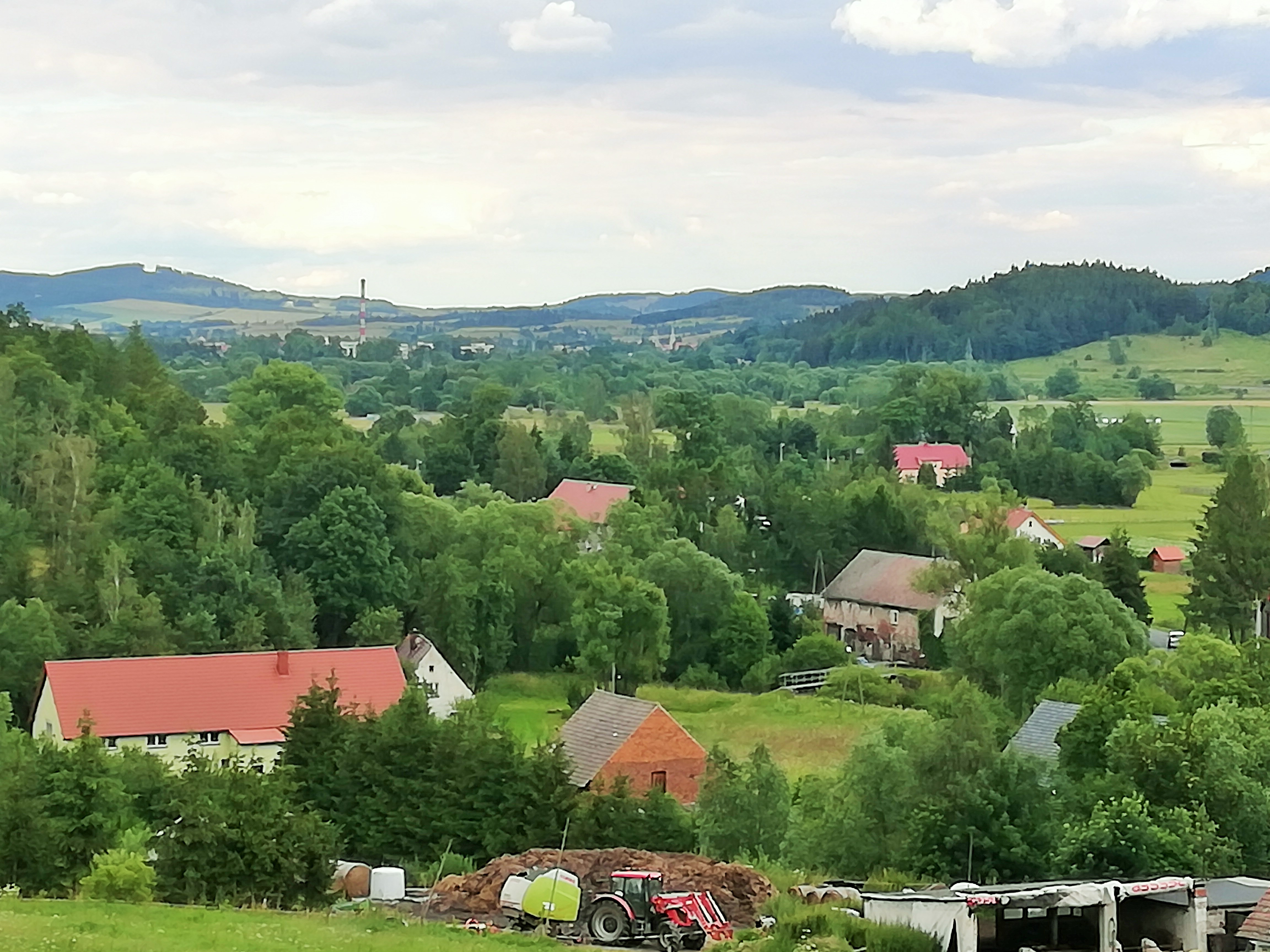
- Janiszów from the hill

- Location within Poland
- Coordinates: 50°45′48″N 15°59′27″E
- Country: Poland
- Voivodeship: Lower Silesian
- County: Kamienna Góra
- Gmina: Kamienna Góra
- Time zone: UTC+1 (CET)
  - Summer (DST): UTC+2 (CEST)
- Vehicle registration: DKA

Janiszów [jaˈniʂuf] is a village in the administrative district of Gmina Kamienna Góra, within Kamienna Góra County, Lower Silesian Voivodeship, in south-western Poland.

== Gallery ==
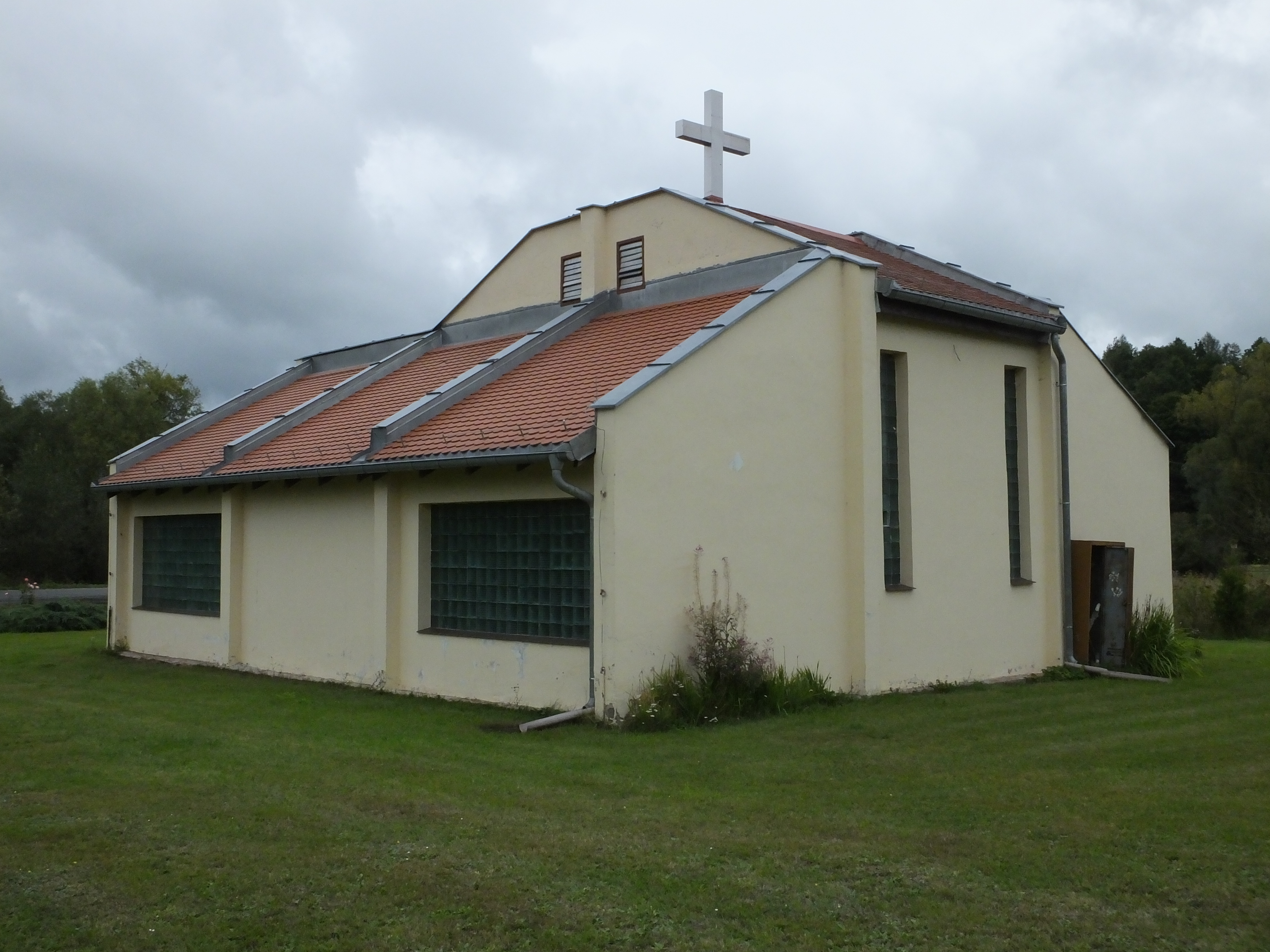
Village chapel

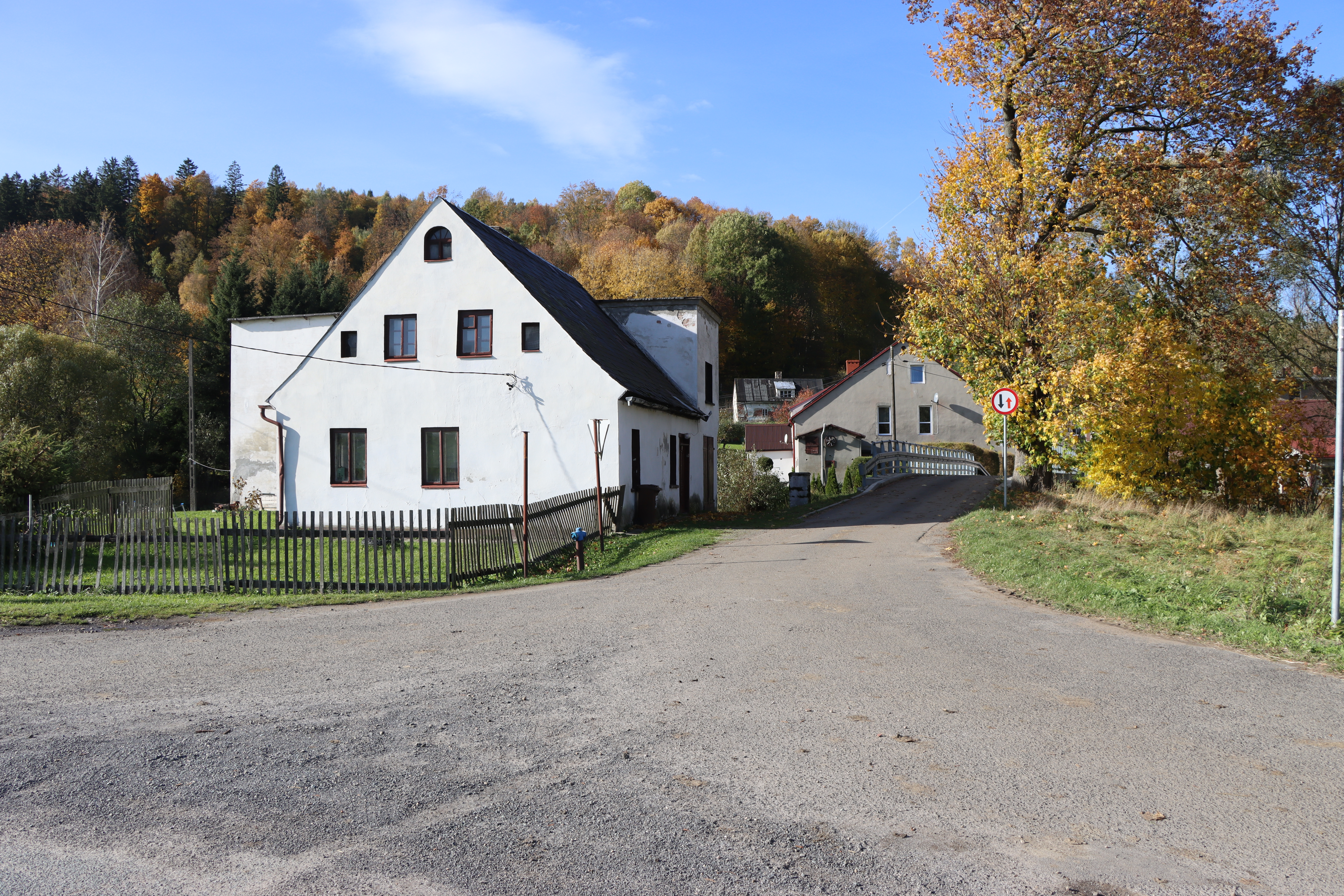
Houses

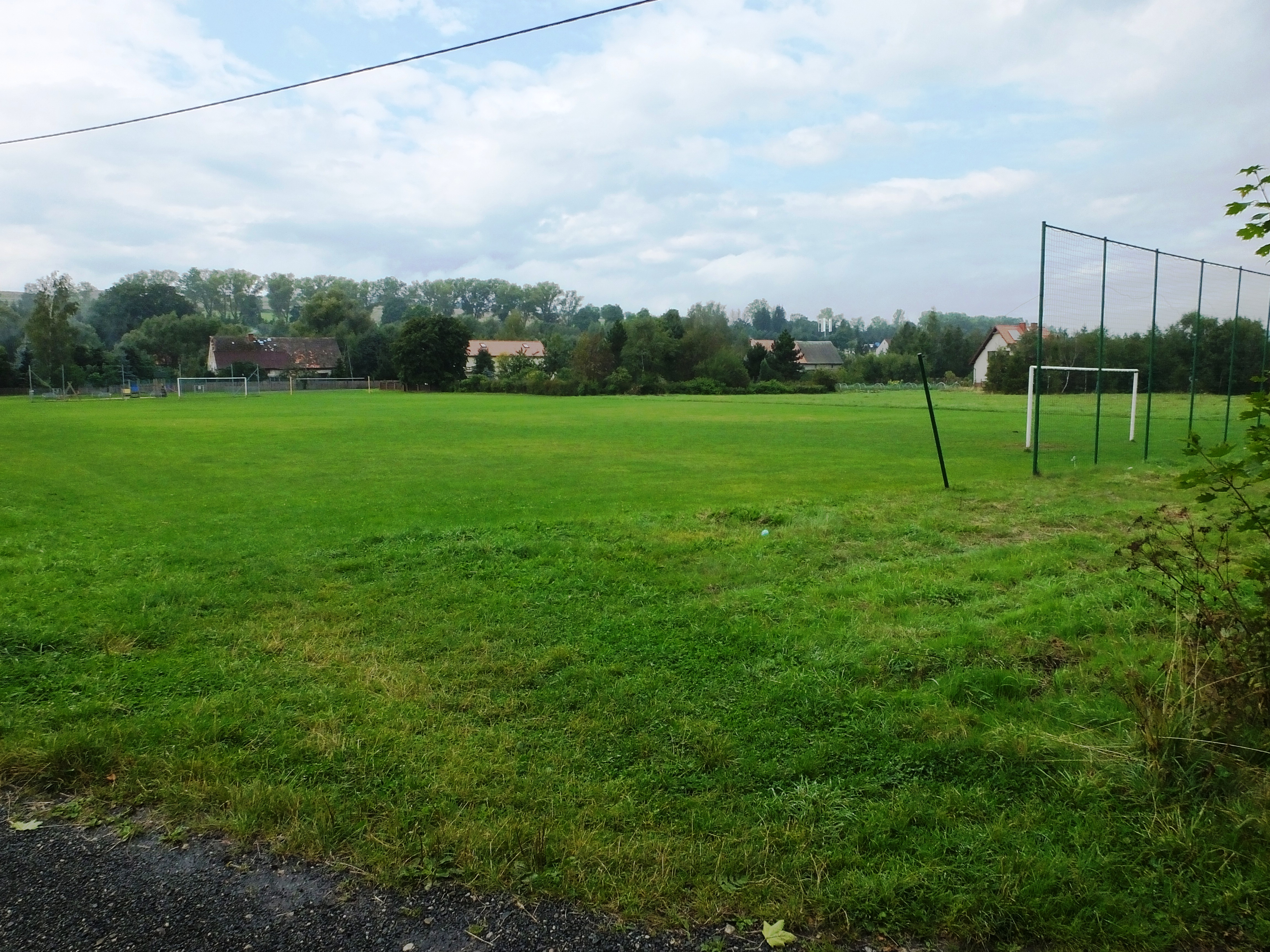
Football venue
