= Olszyny, Lower Silesian Voivodeship =

Olszyny
- Village
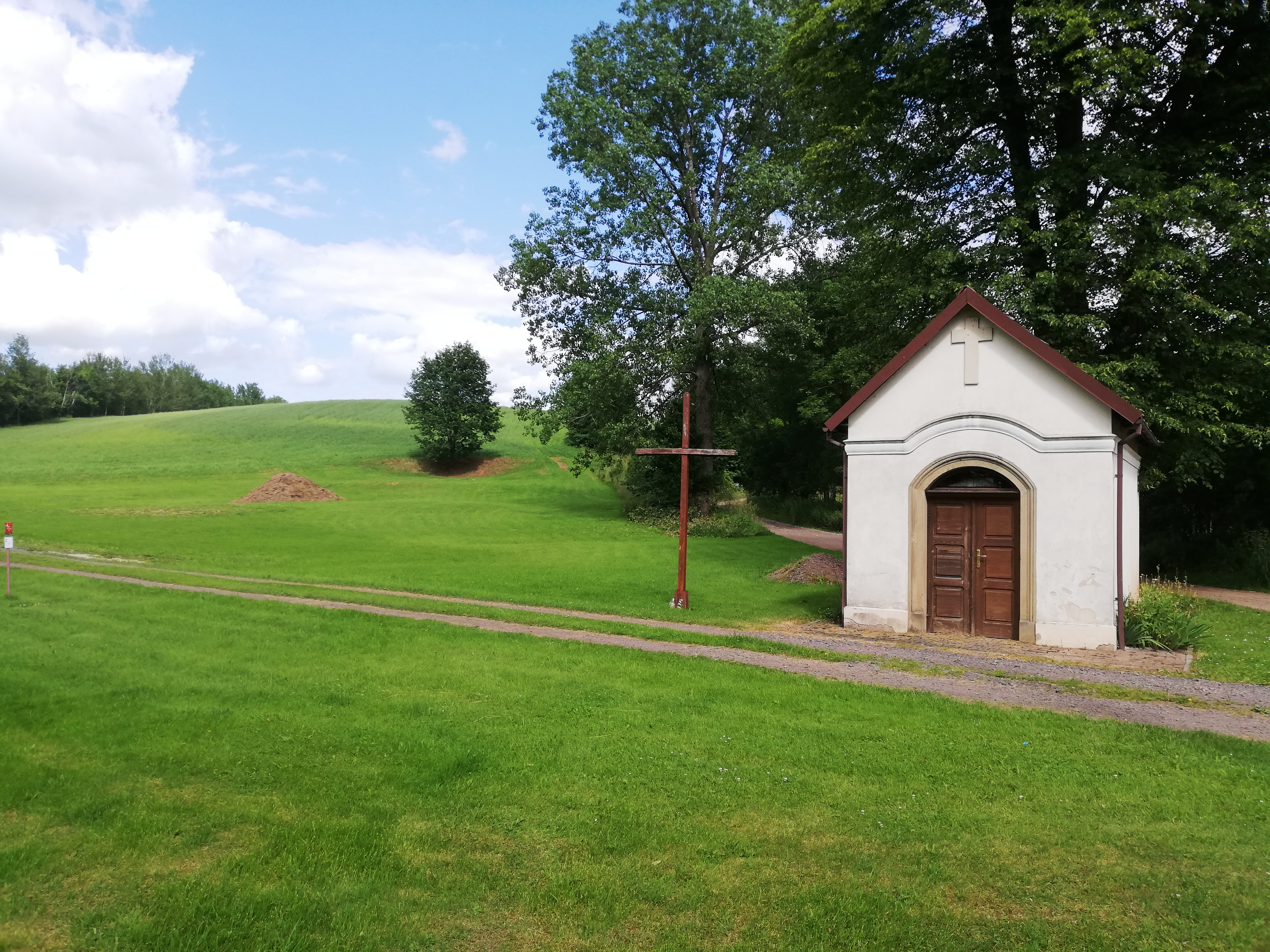
- Chapel in Olszyny

- Location within Poland
- Coordinates: 50°41′N 16°4′E
- Country: Poland
- Voivodeship: Lower Silesian
- County: Kamienna Góra
- Gmina: Kamienna Góra
- Time zone: UTC+1 (CET)
  - Summer (DST): UTC+2 (CEST)
- Vehicle registration: DKA

Olszyny [ɔlˈʂɨnɨ] is a village in the administrative district of Gmina Kamienna Góra, within Kamienna Góra County, Lower Silesian Voivodeship, in south-western Poland.

After World War II, in 1945–1947, Poles expelled from Łanczyn in pre-war south-eastern Poland annexed by the Soviet Union settled in Olszyny. An agricultural cooperative was founded in the village in 1951.
