= Nowa Białka =

- Village
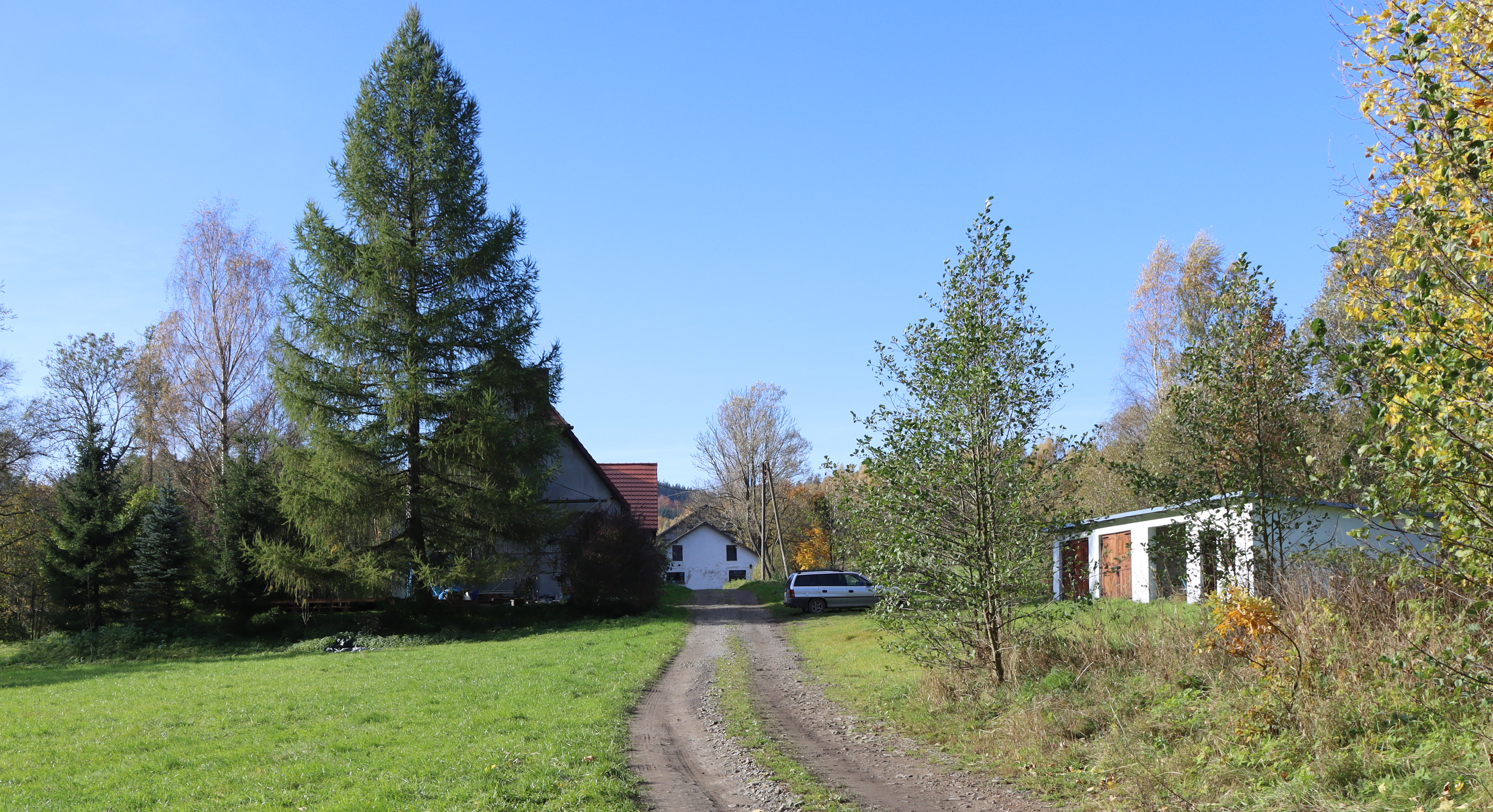
- Houses by the road

- Location within Poland
- Coordinates: 50°45′15″N 15°56′05″E
- Country: Poland
- Voivodeship: Lower Silesian
- County: Kamienna Góra
- Gmina: Kamienna Góra

Nowa Białka [ˈnɔva ˈbjau̯ka] is a village in the administrative district of Gmina Kamienna Góra, within Kamienna Góra County, Lower Silesian Voivodeship, in south-western Poland.

== Gallery ==
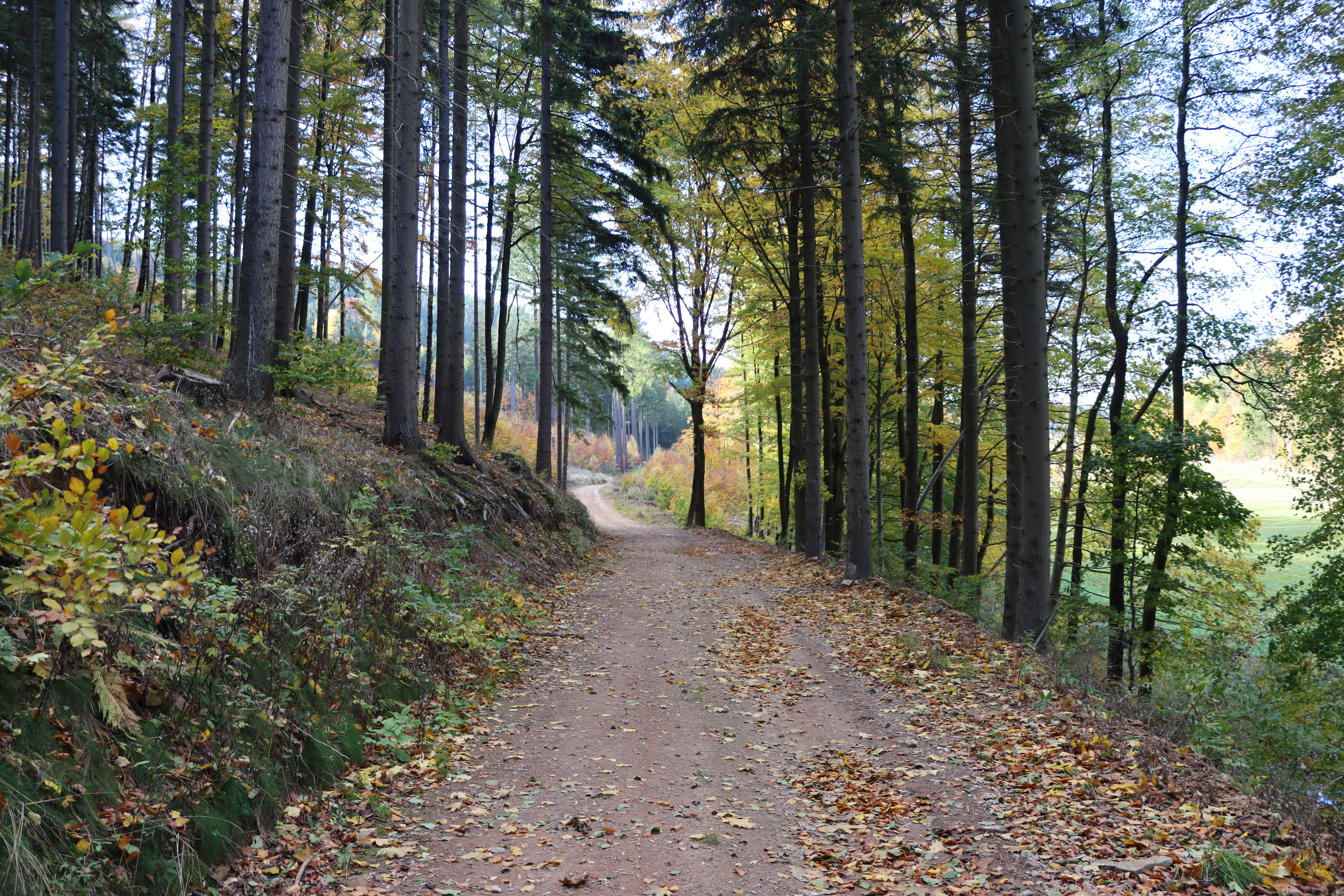
Road to Nowa Białka

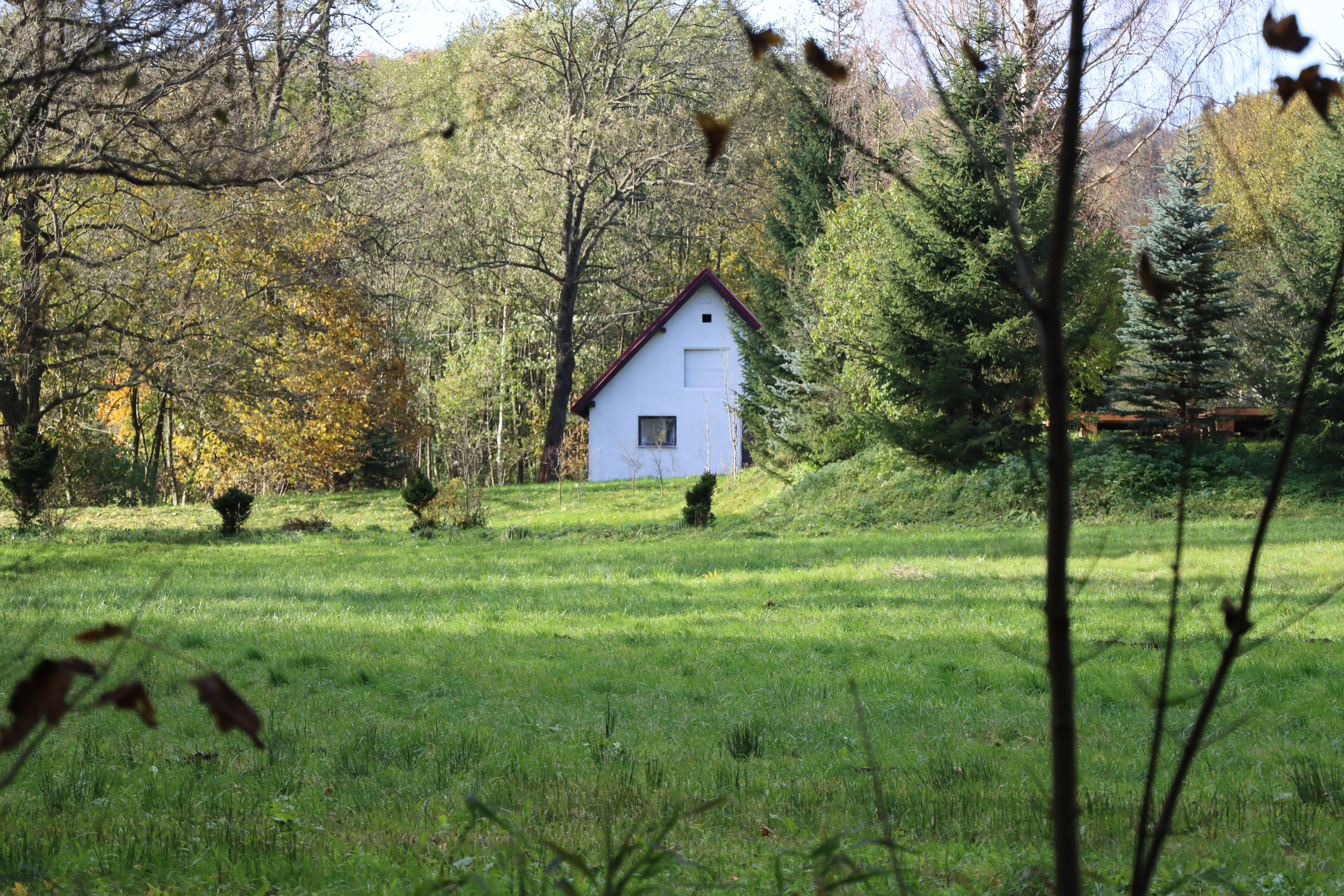
Small house

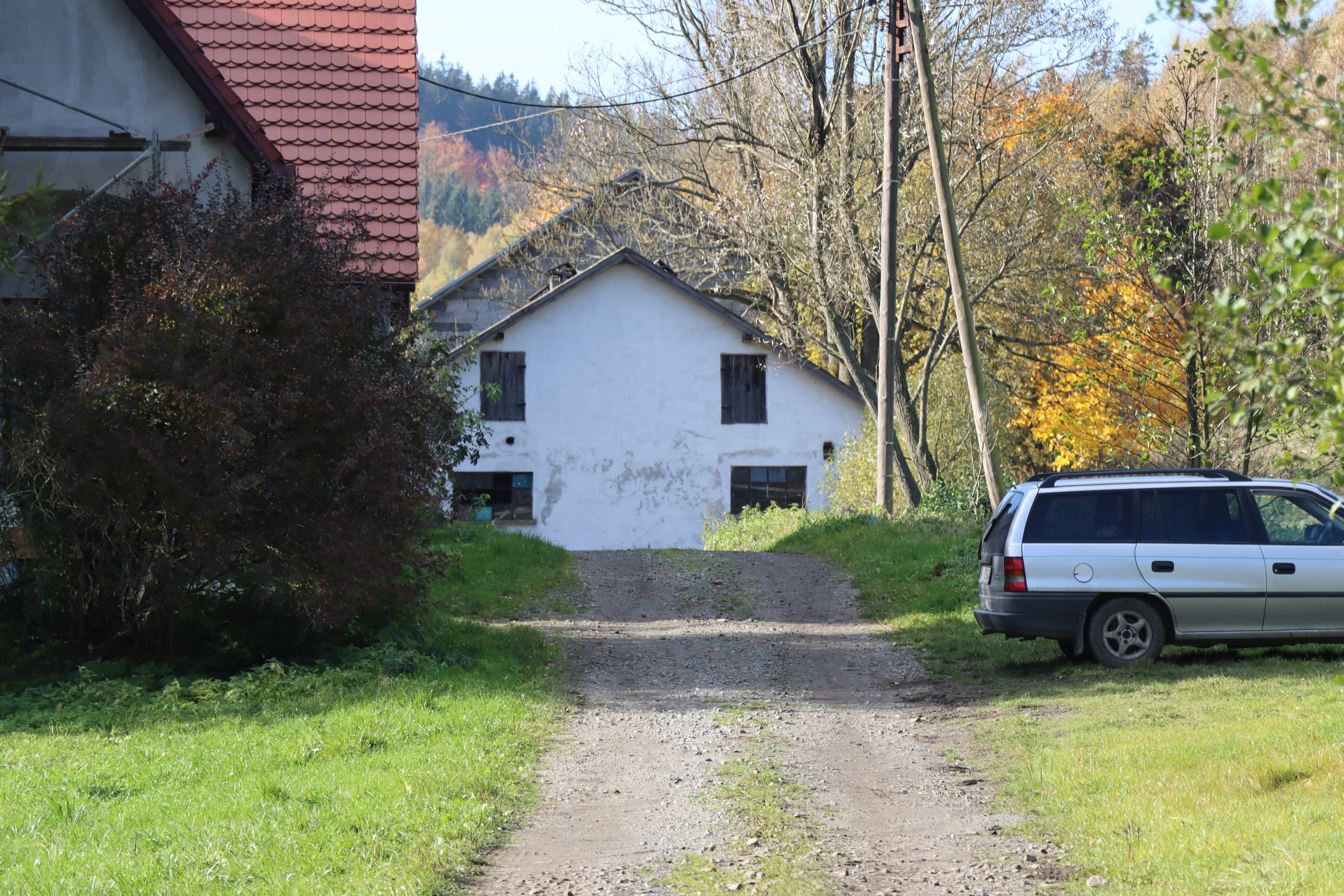
Houses by the road - detail
