= Przedwojów =

- Village
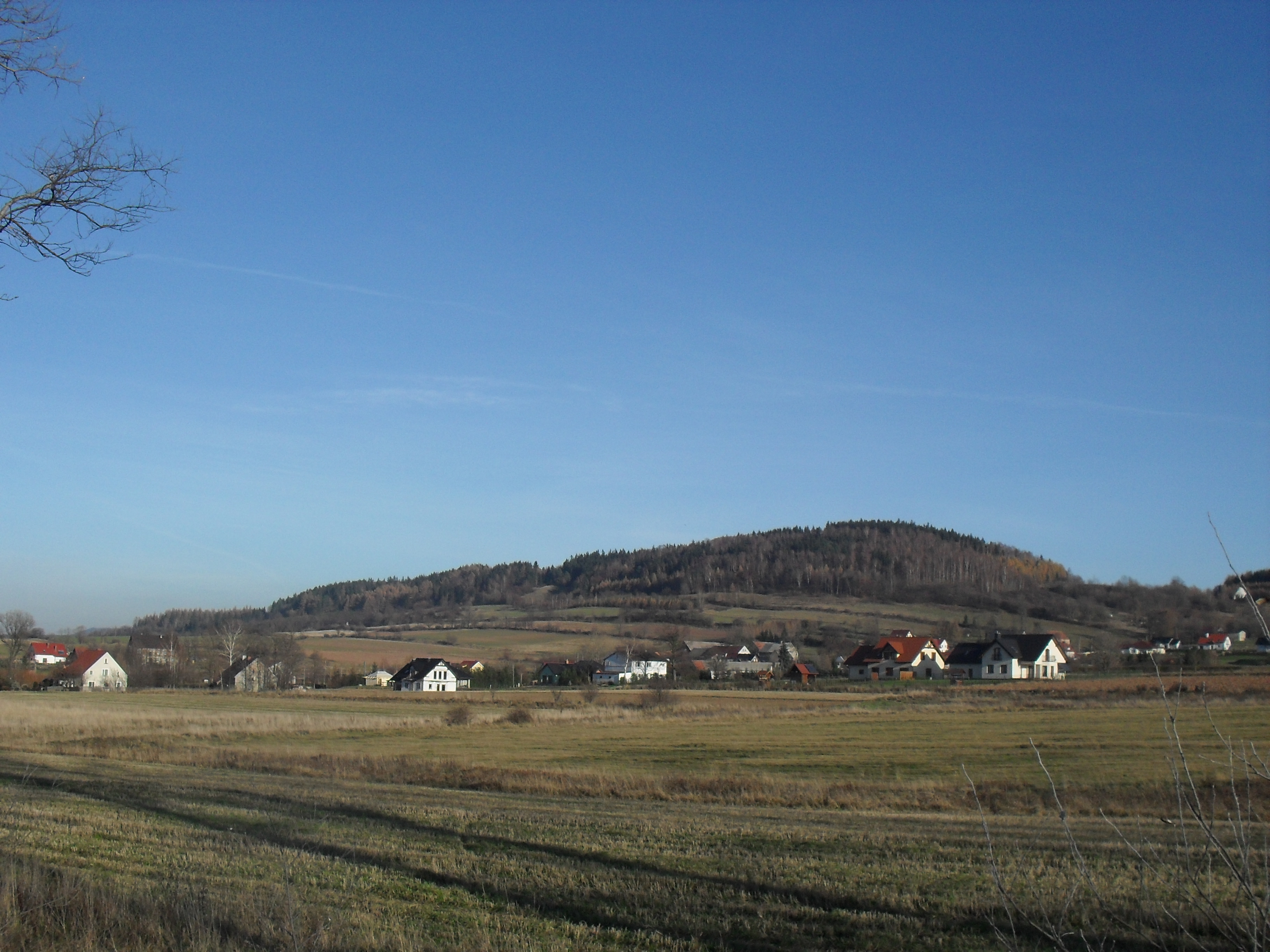

- Location within Poland
- Coordinates: 50°45′17″N 16°00′56″E
- Country: Poland
- Voivodeship: Lower Silesian
- County: Kamienna Góra
- Gmina: Kamienna Góra

Przedwojów [pʂɛdˈvɔjuf] is a village in the administrative district of Gmina Kamienna Góra, within Kamienna Góra County, Lower Silesian Voivodeship, in south-western Poland.
