= Gmina Kamienna Góra =

Gmina Kamienna Góra Kamienna Góra Commune
- Gmina
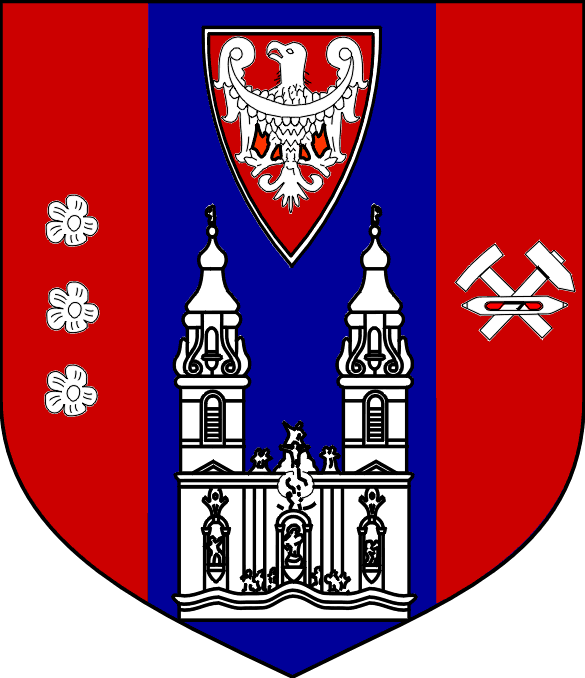
- Coat of arms
- Interactive map of Gmina Kamienna Góra
- Coordinates (Kamienna Góra): 50°49′N 16°3′E
- Country: Poland
- Voivodeship: Lower Silesian
- County: Kamienna Góra
- Seat: Kamienna Góra

Area
  - Total: 158.1 km^{2} (61.0 sq mi)

Population (2019-06-30)
  - Total: 9,019
  - Density: 57.05/km^{2} (147.7/sq mi)
- Website: https://www.gminakamiennagora.pl/

Gmina Kamienna Góra is a rural gmina (administrative district) in Kamienna Góra County, Lower Silesian Voivodeship, in south-western Poland. Its seat is the town of Kamienna Góra, although the town is not part of the territory of the gmina.

The gmina covers an area of 158.1 square kilometres (61.0 sq mi), and as of 2019 its total population is 9,019.

== Neighbouring gminas ==
Gmina Kamienna Góra is bordered by the towns of Kamienna Góra and Kowary, and the gminas of Czarny Bór, Janowice Wielkie, Lubawka, Marciszów, Mieroszów and Mysłakowice.

== Villages ==
The gmina contains the villages of Czadrów, Czarnów, Dębrznik, Dobromyśl, Gorzeszów, Janiszów, Jawiszów, Kochanów, Krzeszów, Krzeszówek, Leszczyniec, Lipienica, Nowa Białka, Ogorzelec, Olszyny, Pisarzowice, Przedwojów, Ptaszków, Raszów, Rędziny and Szarocin.
