= Leszczyniec =

- Village
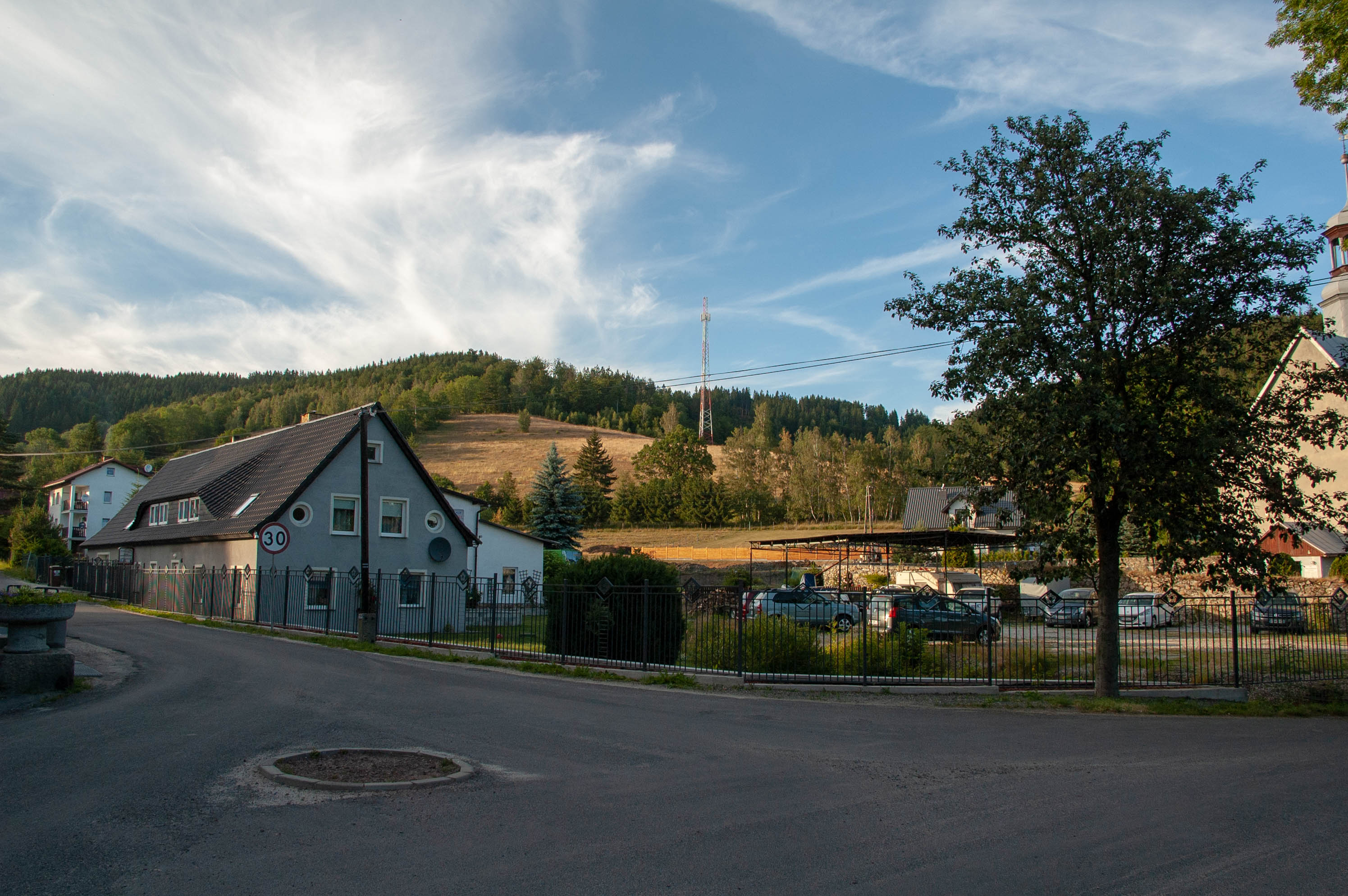
- House by the road

- Location within Poland
- Coordinates: 50°46′35″N 15°54′25″E
- Country: Poland
- Voivodeship: Lower Silesian
- County: Kamienna Góra
- Gmina: Kamienna Góra

Leszczyniec [lɛʂˈt͡ʂɨɲɛt͡s] is a village in the administrative district of Gmina Kamienna Góra, within Kamienna Góra County, Lower Silesian Voivodeship, in south-western Poland.

== Gallery ==
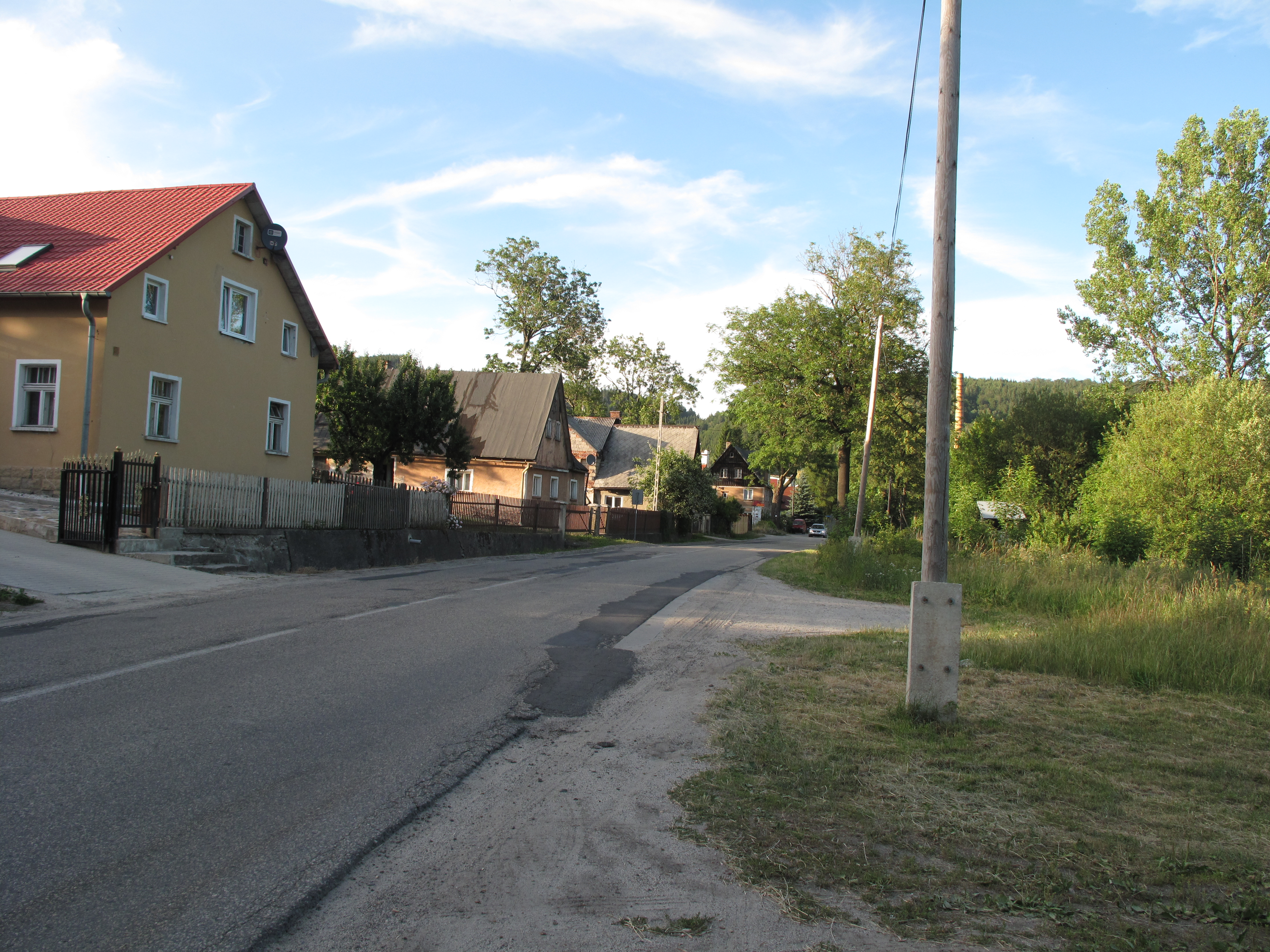
Street

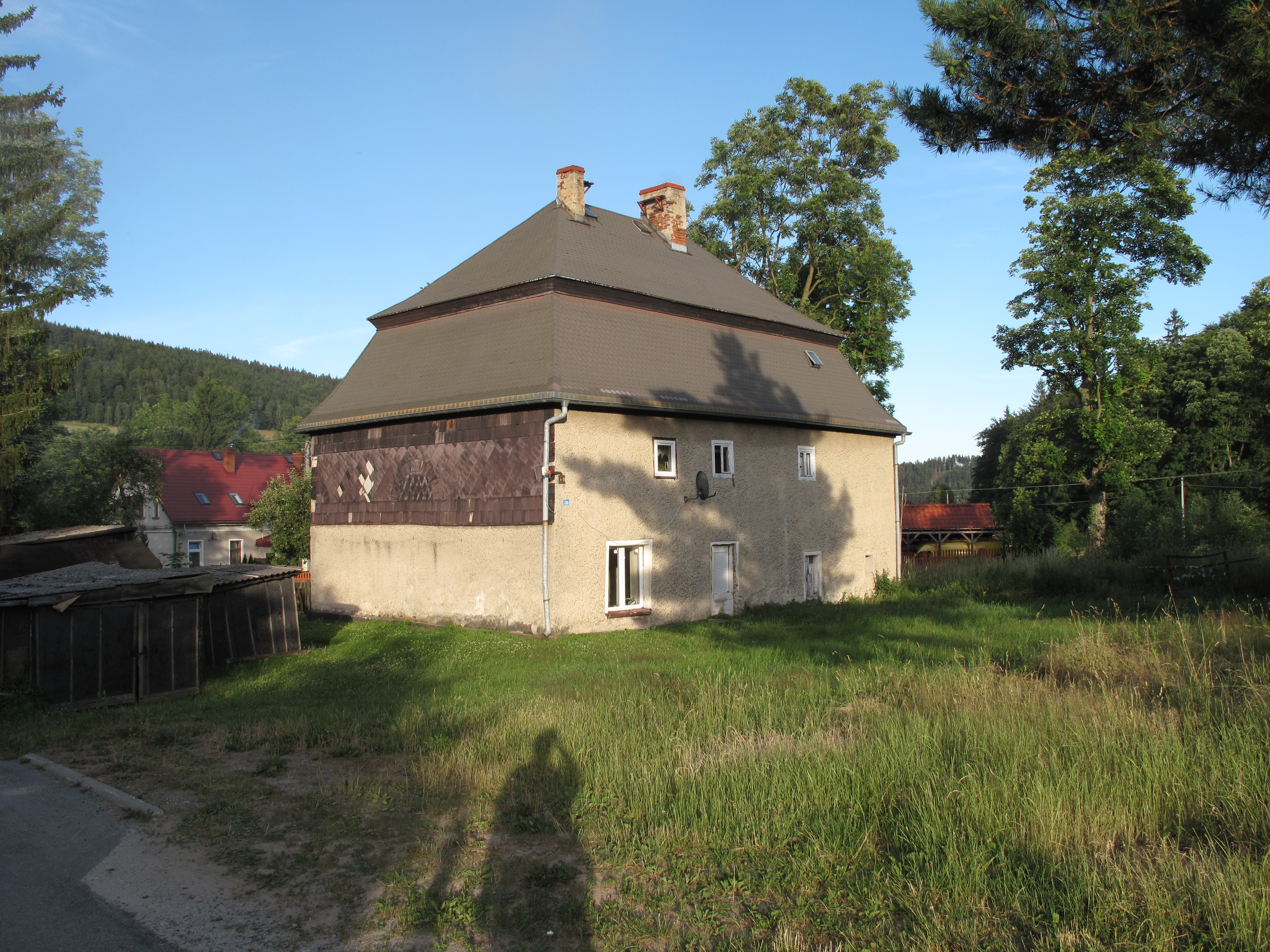
House

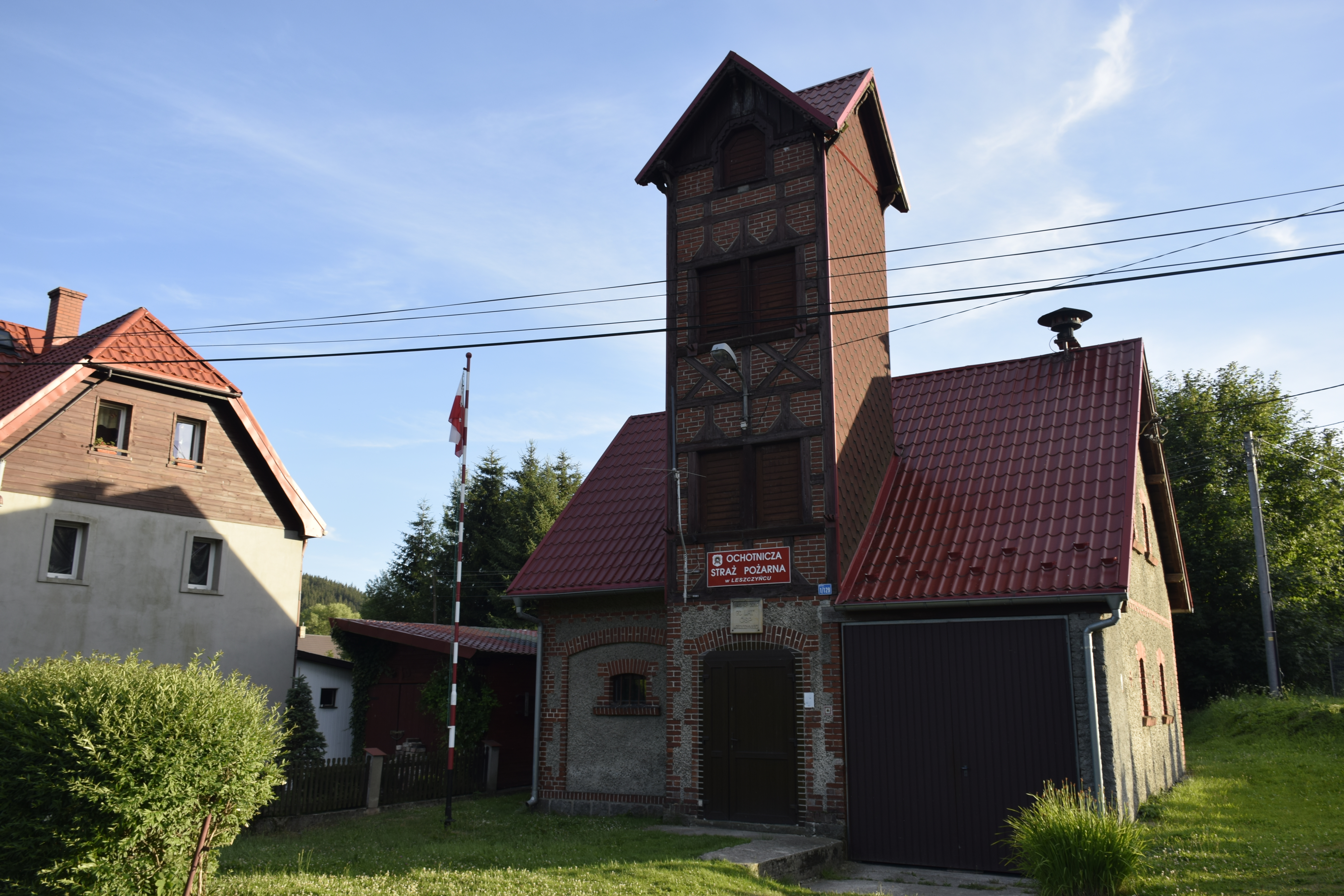
Fire station
