= Raszów, Kamienna Góra County =

Raszów
- Village
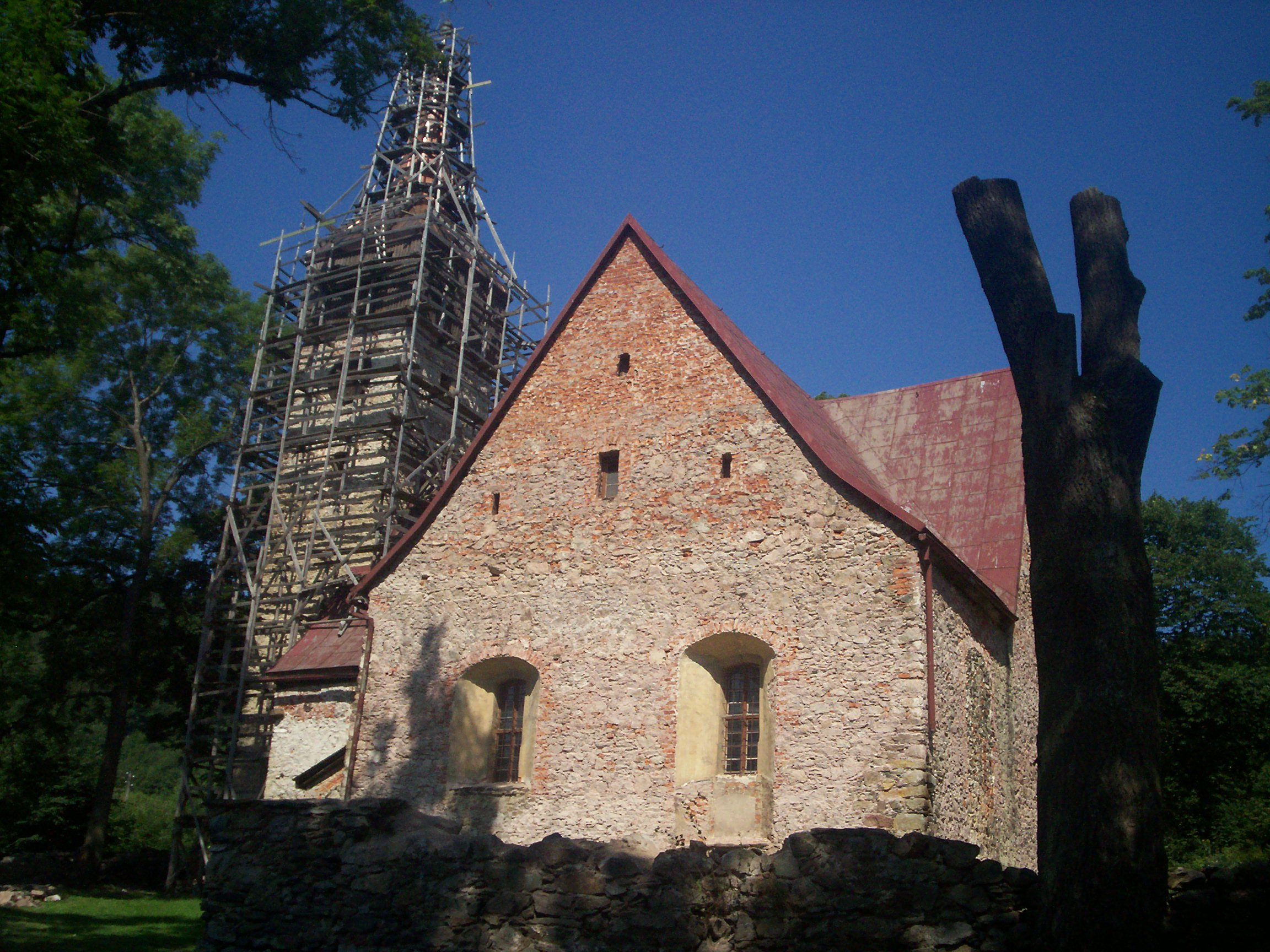

- Location within Poland
- Coordinates: 50°48′N 15°58′E
- Country: Poland
- Voivodeship: Lower Silesian
- County: Kamienna Góra
- Gmina: Kamienna Góra

Raszów [ˈraʂuf] is a village in the administrative district of Gmina Kamienna Góra, within Kamienna Góra County, Lower Silesian Voivodeship, in south-western Poland.
