= Kamienna Góra County =

Coordinates: 50°49′N 16°03′E

Kamienna Góra County Powiat kamiennogórski
- County
- Flag Coat of arms

- Location within the voivodeship
- Country: Poland
- Voivodeship: Lower Silesian
- Seat: Kamienna Góra
- Gminas: Total 4 (incl. 1 rural): Kamienna Góra; Gmina Kamienna Góra; Gmina Lubawka; Gmina Marciszów

Area
  - Total: 396.13 km^{2} (152.95 sq mi)

Population (2019-06-30)
  - Total: 43,429
  - Density: 109.63/km^{2} (283.95/sq mi)
  - Urban: 25,038
  - Rural: 18,391
- Car plates: DKA
- Website: www.kamienna-gora.pl

Kamienna Góra County (Polish: powiat kamiennogórski) is a unit of territorial administration and local government (powiat) in Lower Silesian Voivodeship, south-western Poland. It came into being on January 1, 1999, as a result of the Polish local government reforms passed in 1998. The county covers an area of 396.1 square kilometres (152.9 sq mi). Its administrative seat is the town of Kamienna Góra; the only other town in the county is Lubawka.

As of 2019 the total population of the county is 43,429, out of which the population of Kamienna Góra is 19,010, the population of Lubawka is 6,028 and the rural population is 18,391.

== Neighbouring counties ==
Kamienna Góra County is bordered by Karkonosze County to the west, Jawor County to the north and Wałbrzych County to the east. It also borders the Czech Republic to the south.

== Administrative divisions ==
The county is subdivided into four gminas (one urban, one urban-rural and two rural). These are listed in the following table, in descending order of population.

Gmina	Type	Area (km^{2})	Population (2019)	Seat
Kamienna Góra	urban	18.0	19,010	
Gmina Lubawka	urban-rural	138.1	10,901	Lubawka
Gmina Kamienna Góra	rural	158.1	9,019	Kamienna Góra*
Gmina Marciszów	rural	82.0	4,499	Marciszów
* seat not part of the gmina
