= Rudawy Janowickie =

Mountain range in Poland

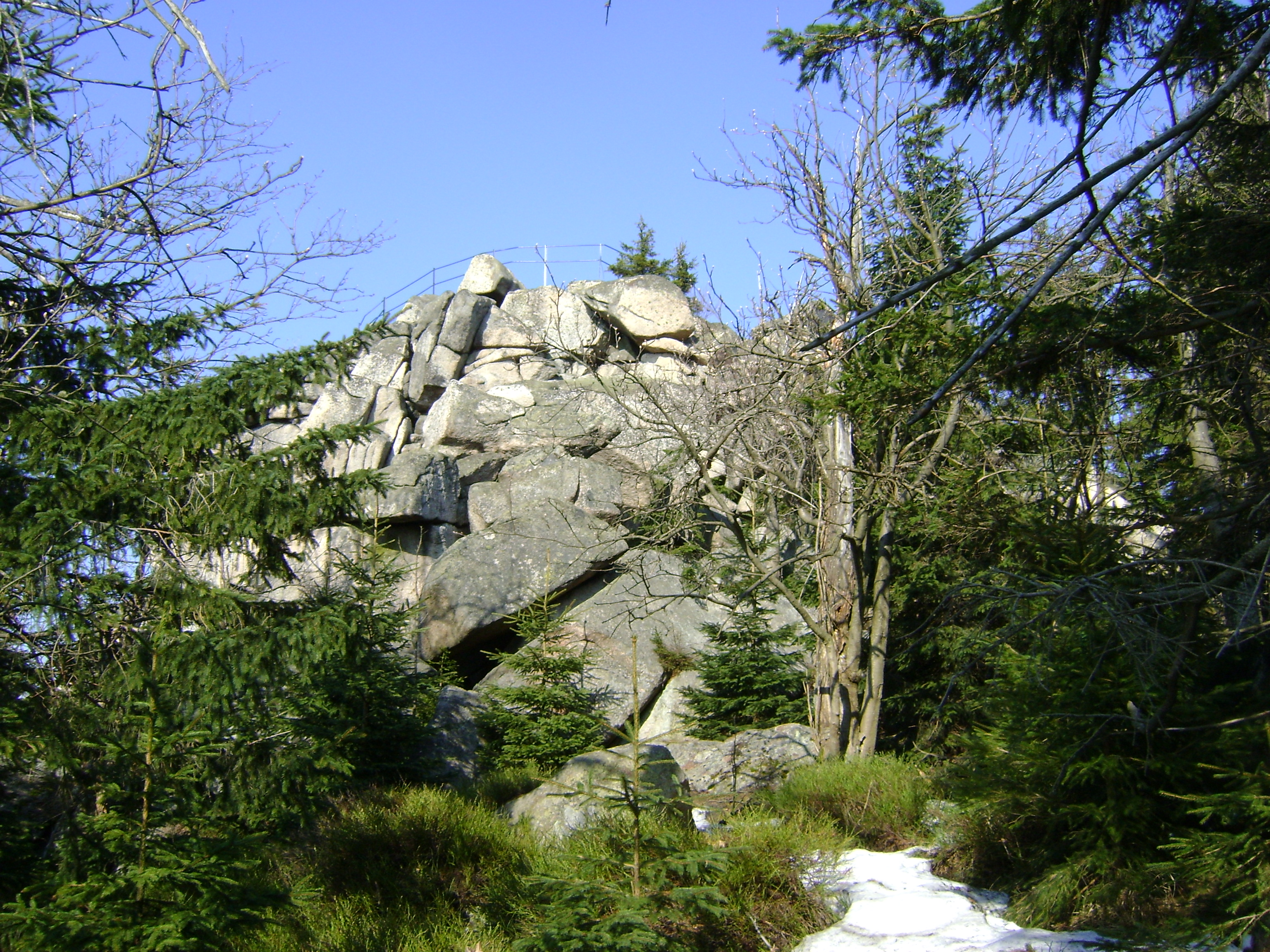
- Skalnik - Ostra Mała

Highest point
- Peak: Skalnik (southwestern summit - Ostra Mała)
- Elevation: 945 m (3,100 ft)
- Coordinates: 50°48′26.5″N 15°53′38.7″E

Geography
- Country: Poland
- State: Lower Silesian Voivodeship
- Parent range: Sudetes

The Rudawy Janowickie is a mountain range in the Sudetes in Lower Silesian Voivodeship in south-western Poland. The highest point is Ostra Mała (Sharp Little) - the southwestern summit of Skalnik. The most difficult is Enis, whose easiest route is rated VI UIAA.

The Rudawy Janowickie lie in the Bóbr River basin, which flows around them from the east and north.

== History ==
During World War II, Nazi Germany established and operated two subcamps of the Gross-Rosen concentration camp in the Rudawy Janowickie.

Poland's first Hindu temple, the New Shantipur Temple in Czarnów, was founded in the Rudawy Janowickie in 1980.

== Tourism ==
The Rudawy Janowickie Mountains are a popular tourist destination. They offer easy hiking on marked trails.

The Rudawy Janowickie, next to the Sokole Mountains, are a Lower Silesian mecca for climbers. There are several hundred of climbing routes on dozens of granite rocks. There are both sport and traditional routes.

Public transport on the Wrocław - Jelenia Góra route (via Janowice Wielkie) is provided by the Lower Silesian Railways (KD) and Polregio.

== Towns ==
Janowice Wielkie, Miedzianka, Ciechanowice, Mniszków, Wieściszowice, Strużnica, Pisarzowice, Ogorzelec.

== Gallery ==
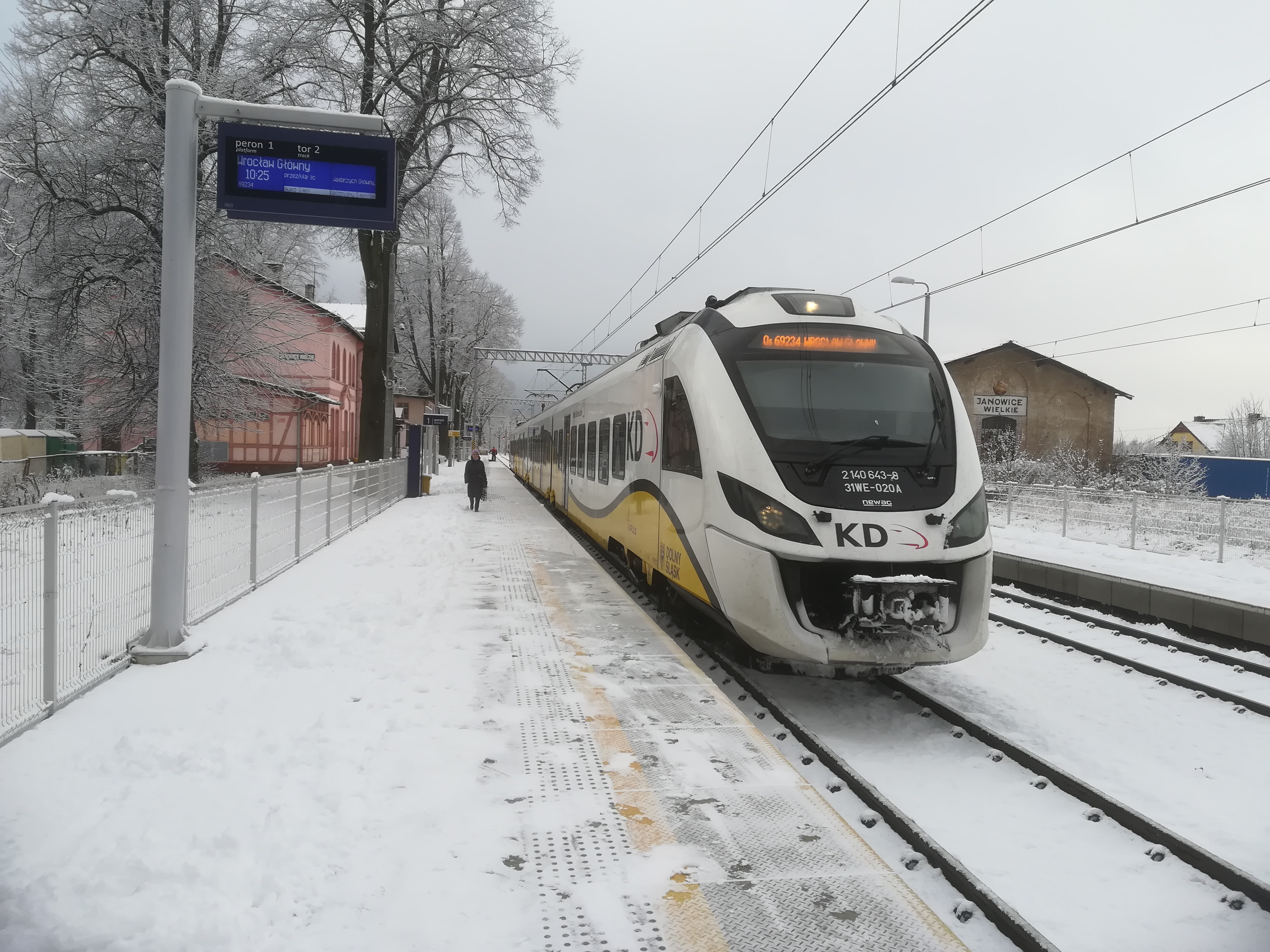
A Lower Silesian Railways (KD) train at Janowice Wielkie railway station

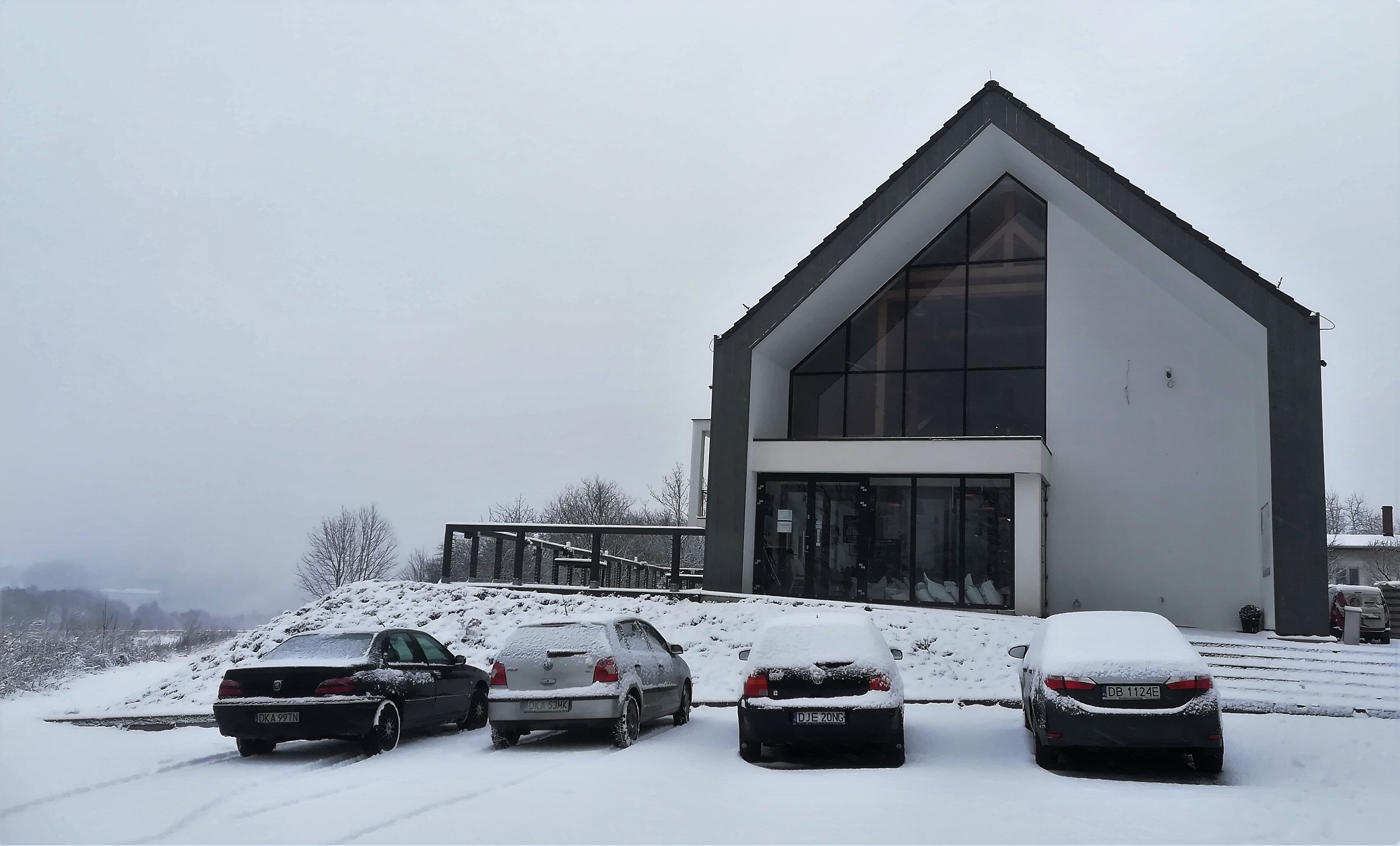
Brewpub Miedzianka

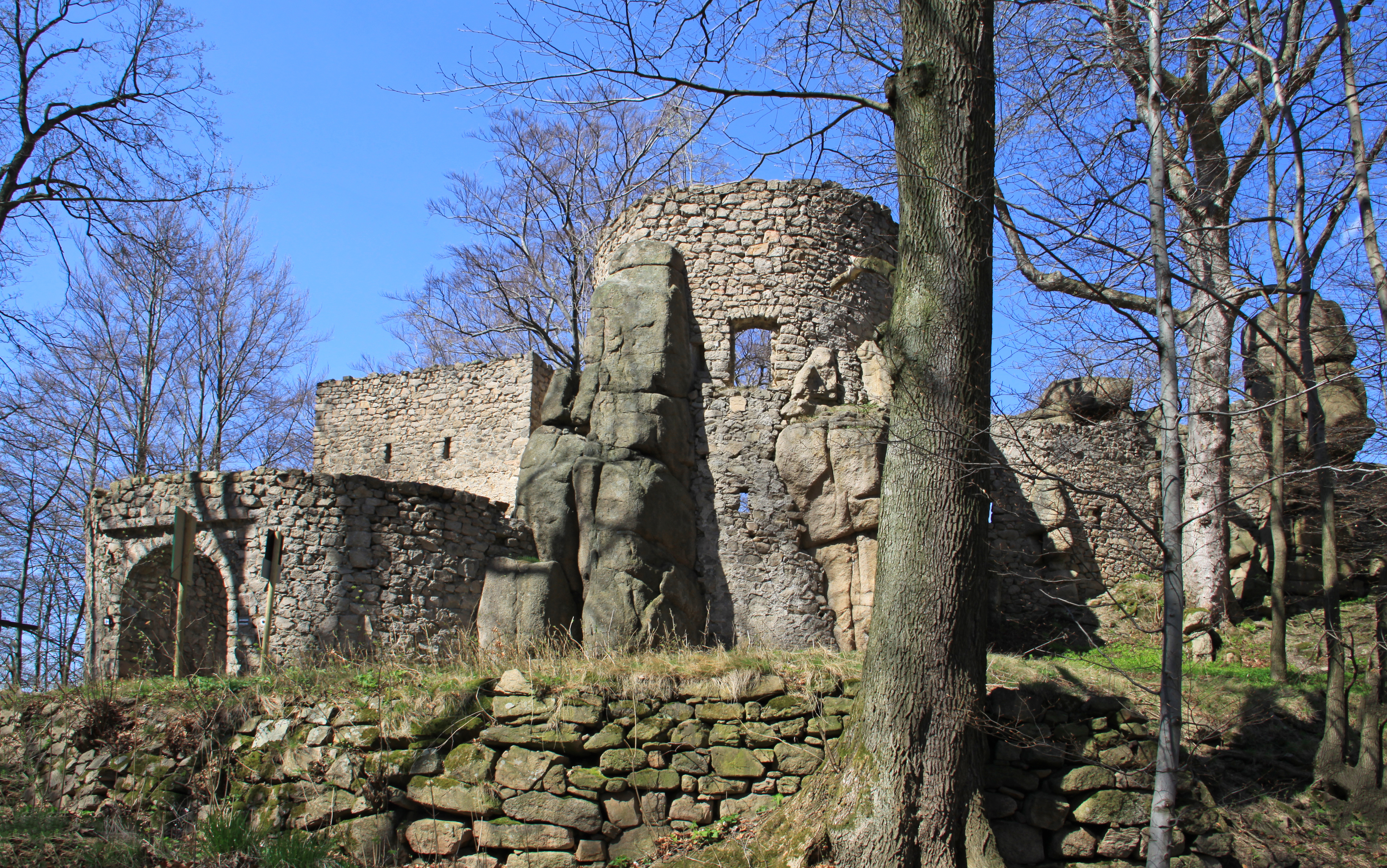
Bolcz Castle

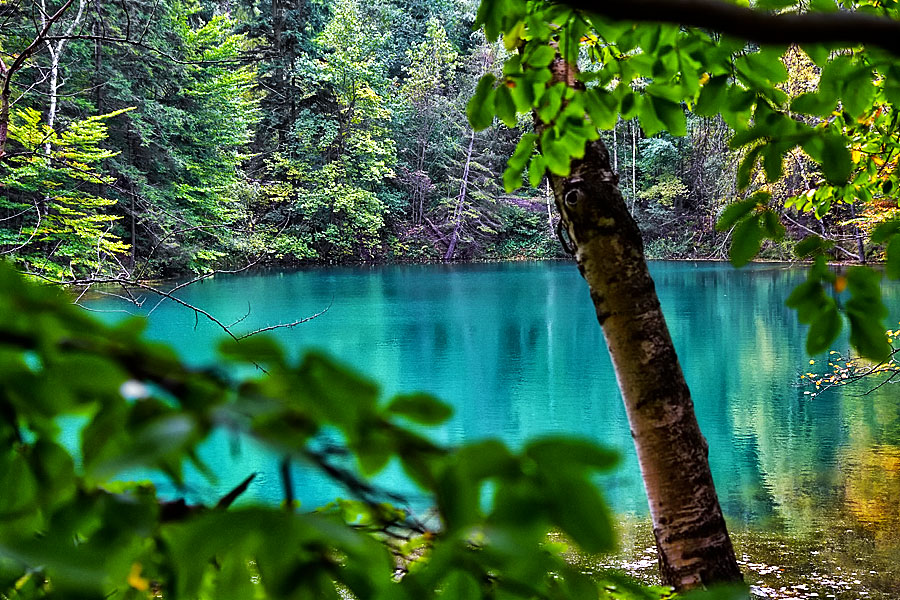
Colourful lakelets

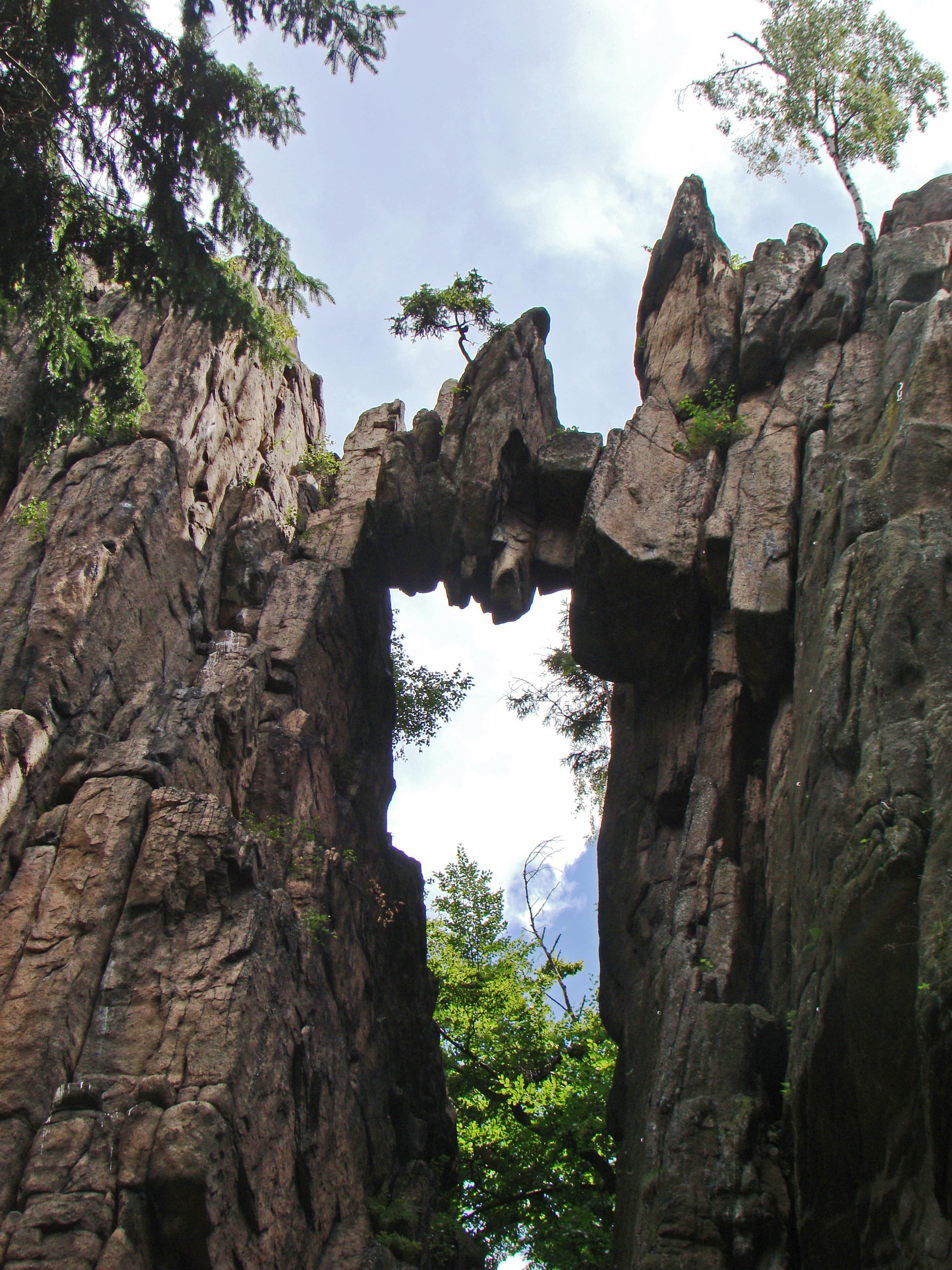
Rock Bridge

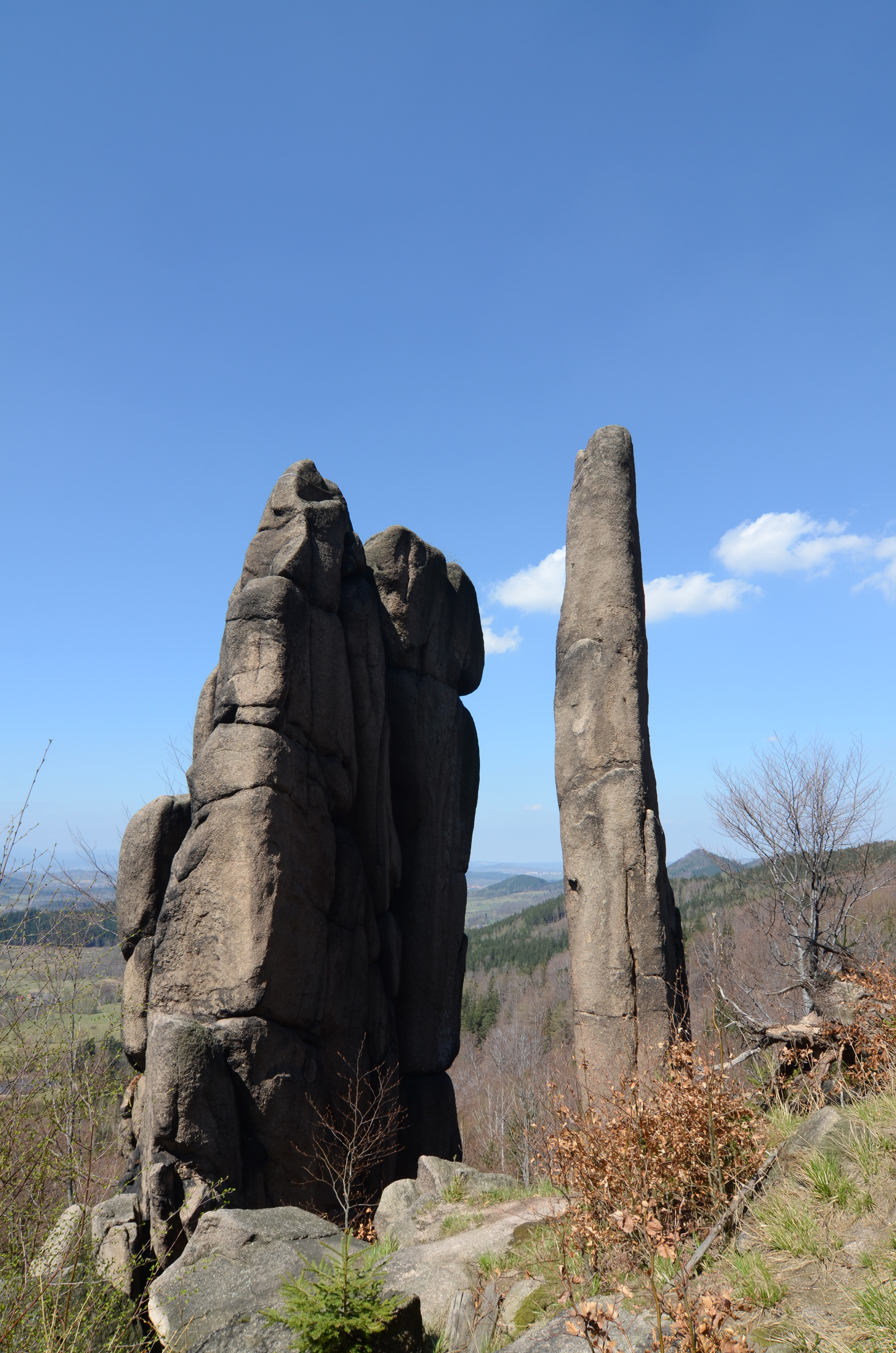
Enis by right

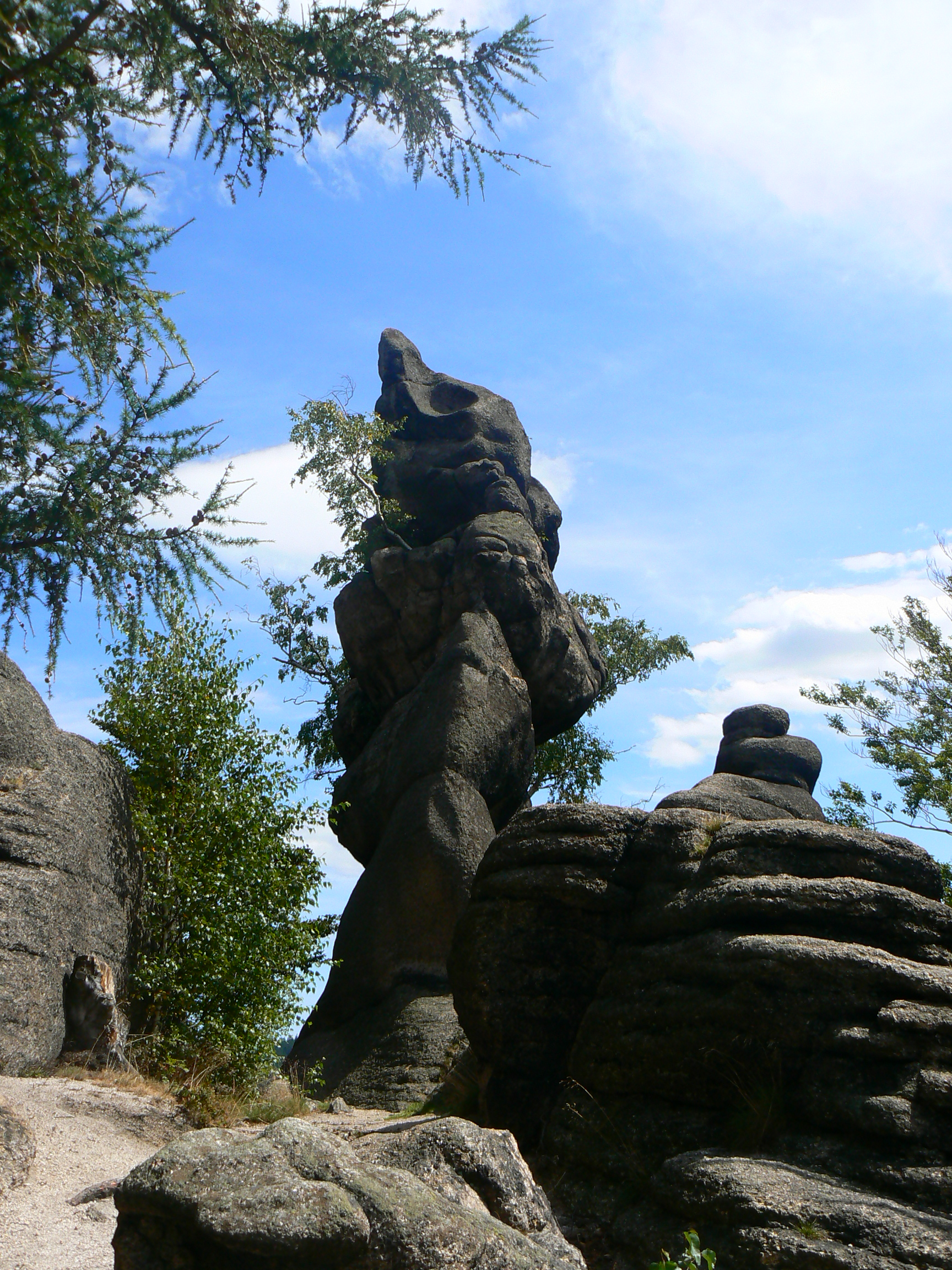
Starościńska Needle

== See also ==
- Colourful lakelets
