= Komarno =

Komarno may refer to:

- Komárno, a town in Slovakia
- Komárno (Kroměříž District), a village in the Czech Republic
- Komarno, Ukraine, a city in Ukraine
- Komarno (Hasidic dynasty)
- Komarno, Manitoba, a community within Rural Municipality of Rockwood, Manitoba, Canada
- Komarno, Lower Silesian Voivodeship, a village in south-west Poland
- Komarno, Lublin Voivodeship, a village in east Poland
- Komarno, a settlement in Crmnica, Montenegro

== See also ==
- Komarna, a village in southern Dalmatia, Croatia
- Komárom, a town in Hungary
