= Colourful lakelets =

Artificial ponds in Sudetes Mountains, Poland

Coordinates: 50°49′N 15°58′E

Colourful lakelets (Polish "Kolorowe Jeziorka") is the name of three (sometimes four) artificial ponds formed in place of former mines at the slope of Wielka Kopa mountain (871 m) in Rudawy Janowickie, range in Sudetes Mountains, Poland. The biggest one and the oldest (1785) was named Hoffnung Grube and now hosts the Purple lakelet. Names of the other mines were: Neues Glück (1793, presently Azure Lakelet), and Gustav Grube (1796; the Green Lakelet). These places were mined from 1785 to 1925 for pyrite.

The lakelets have various surface elevation. The Purple lakelet (560 m) owes its colour to chemical composition of its banks and bottom which are abundant with iron compounds, mainly pyrite. The pond is filled with water solution of sulphuric acid (pH = 3). It is highly recommended to avoid any contact with the water for it might be dangerous. Below Purple Lakelet there is a smaller hollow which is at times filled with waters falling from the pond above – it is called Yellow Lakelet.

The colour of Azure Lakelet (635 m; also called: Blue or Emerald) water is connected with the presence of copper ions. Its water, besides its colour, is clean, thus during hot summer days there can be seen people bathing in it; water is usually quite cold here, though.

Green Lakelet (730 m; also called Black Pond), same as Azure Lakelet owes its colour to copper compounds. Depending on rainfall, it temporarily disappears.

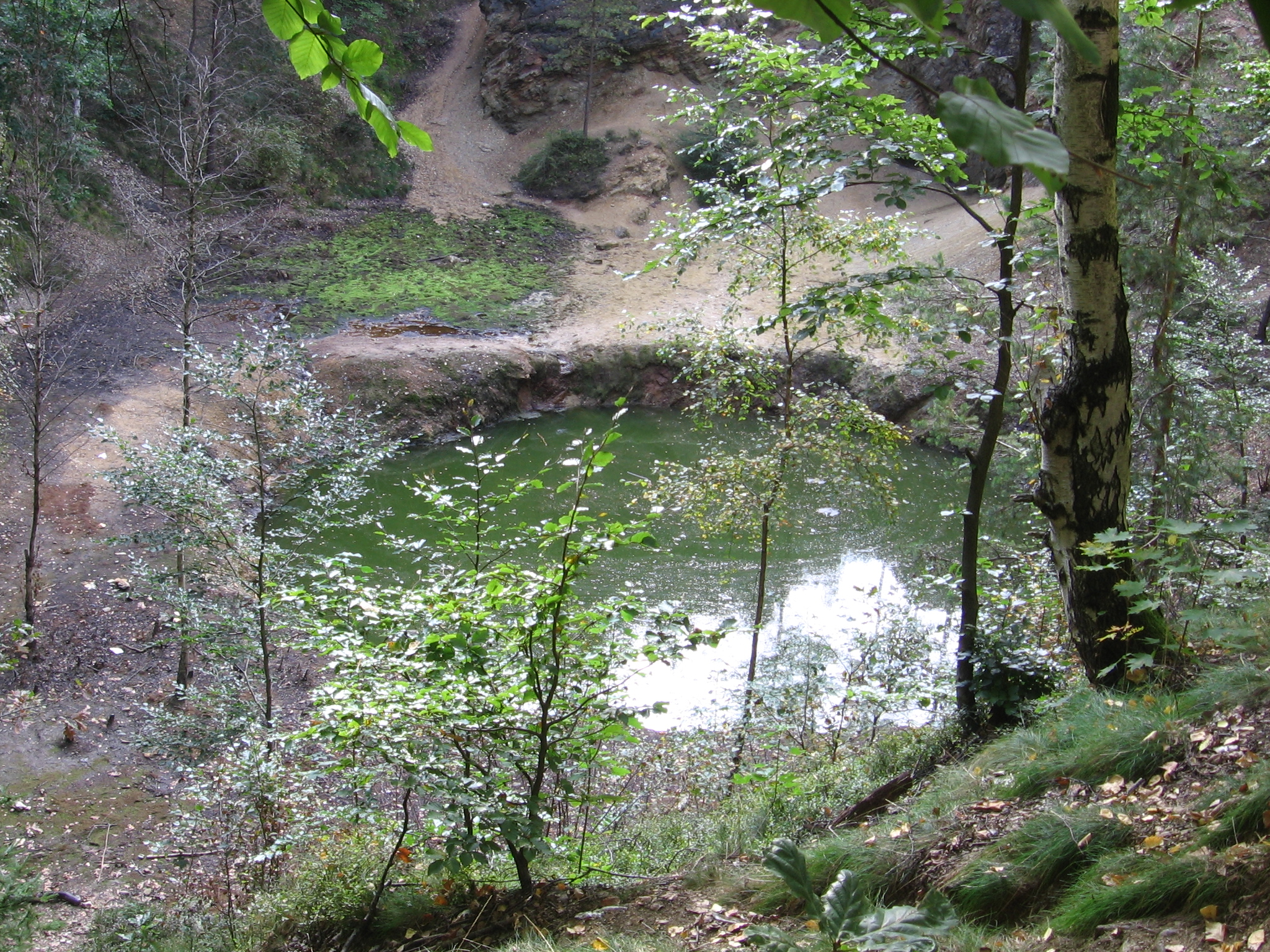
Yellow Lakelet

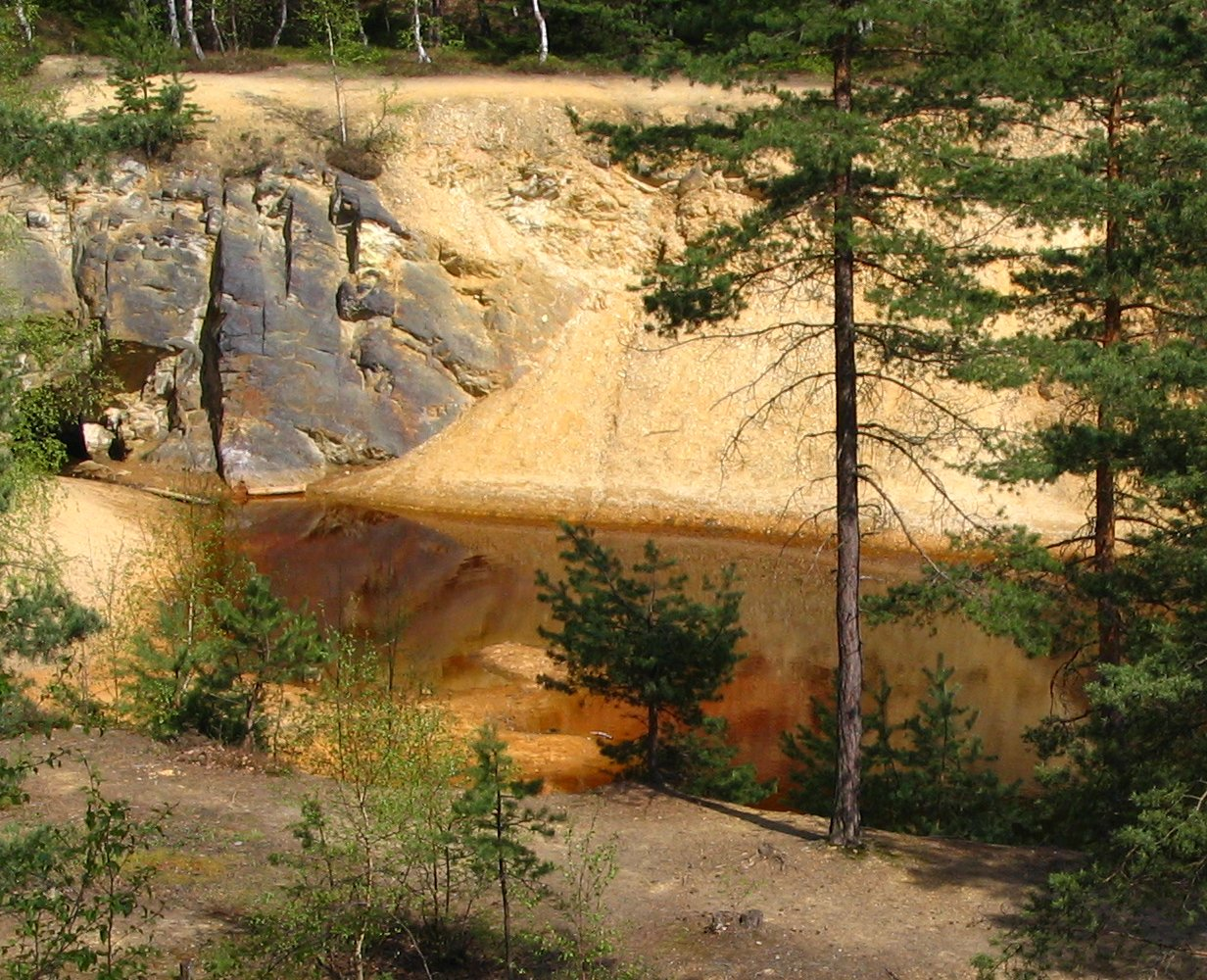
Purple Lakelet

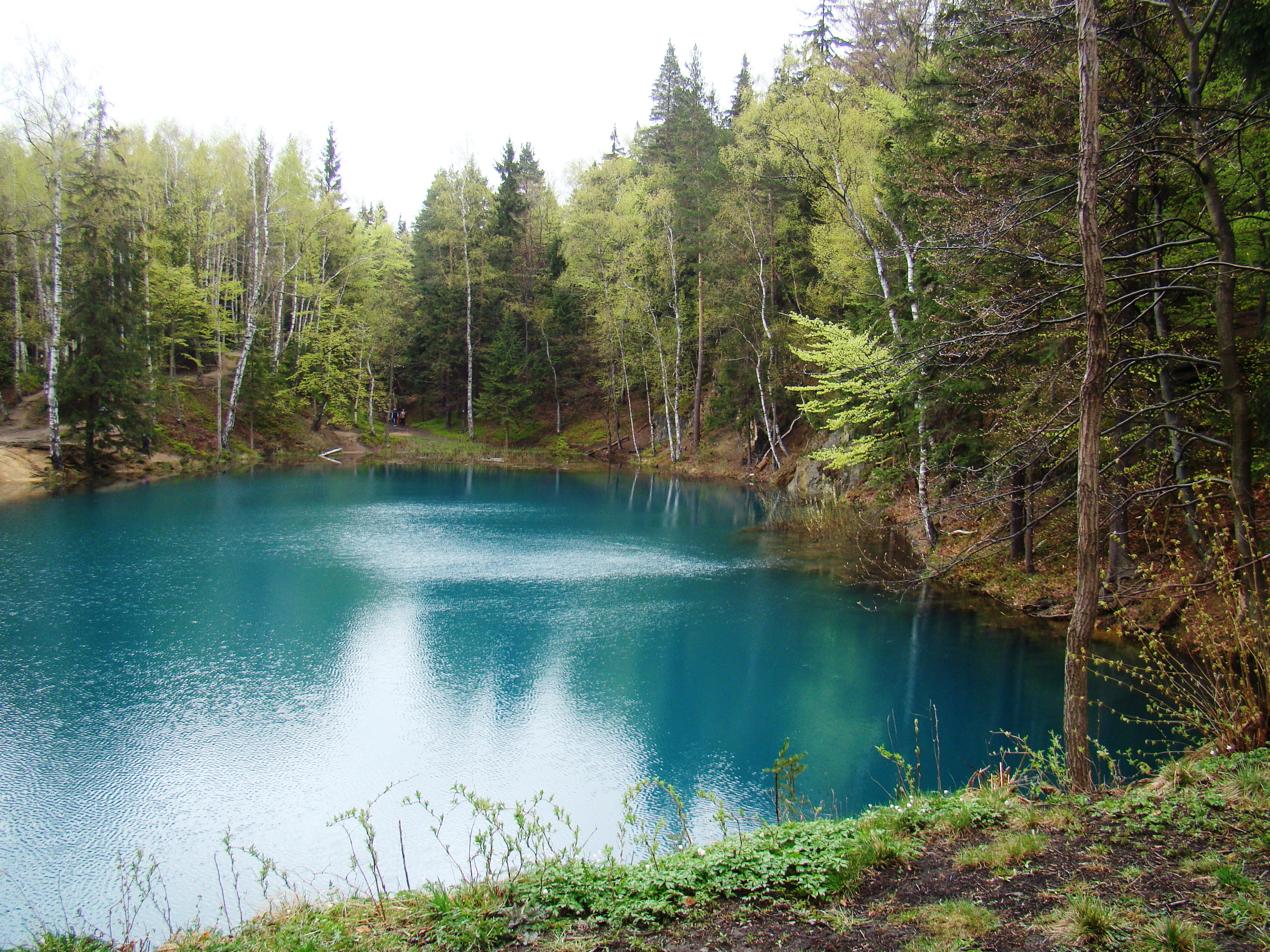
Azure Lakelet

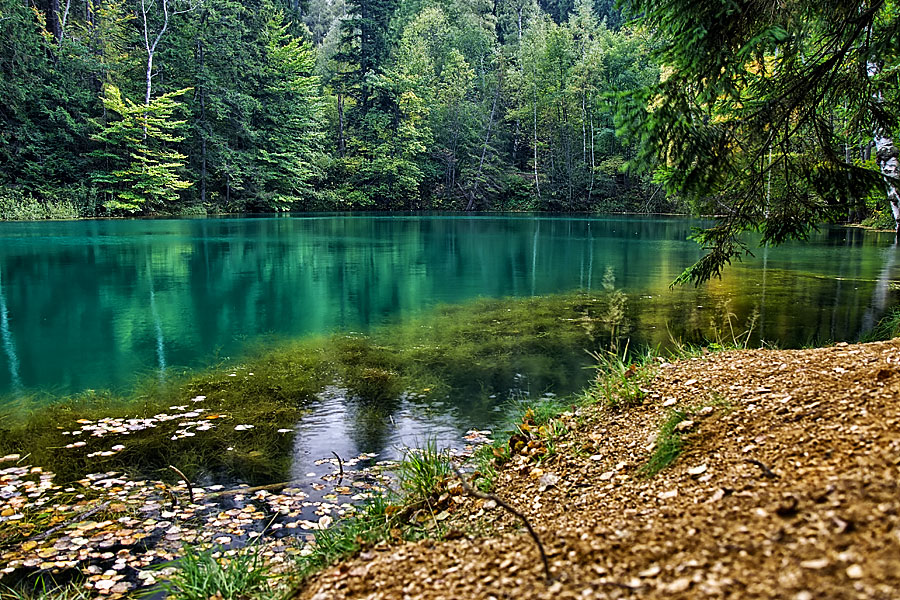
Azure Lakelet

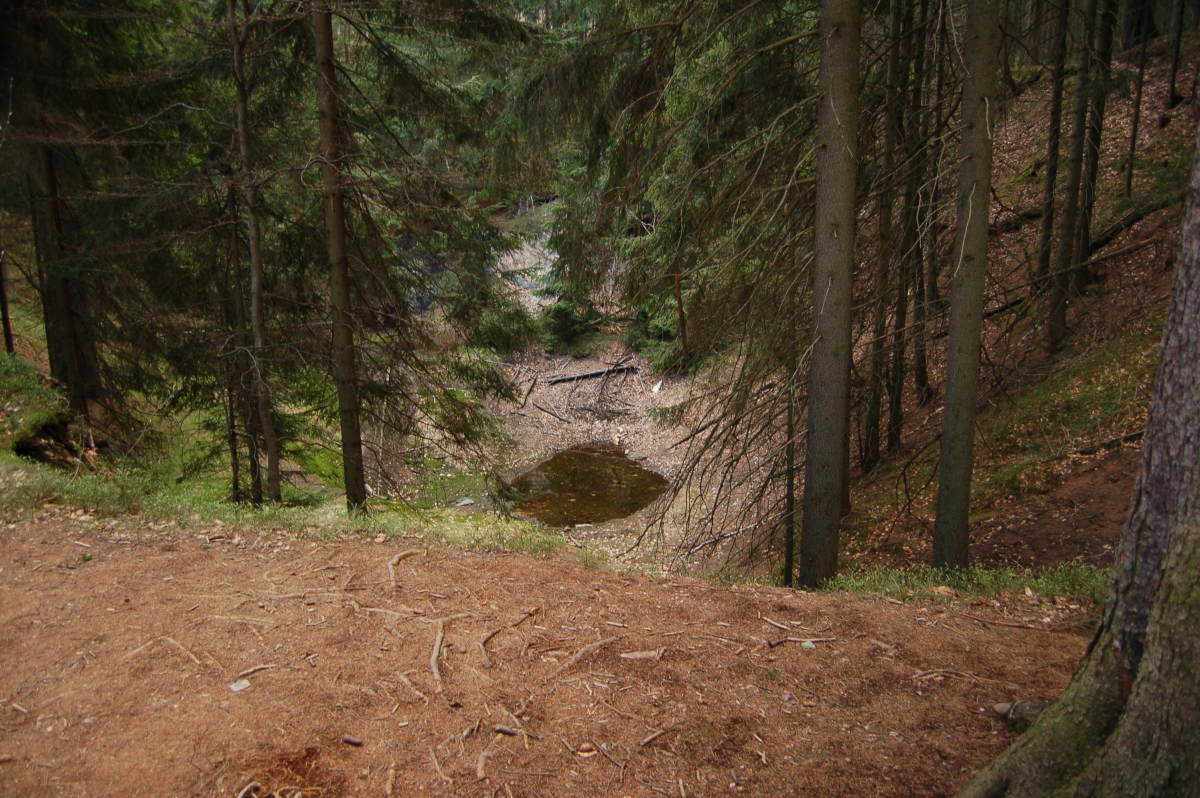
Green Lakelet
