= Radomierz, Lower Silesian Voivodeship =

Radomierz
- Village
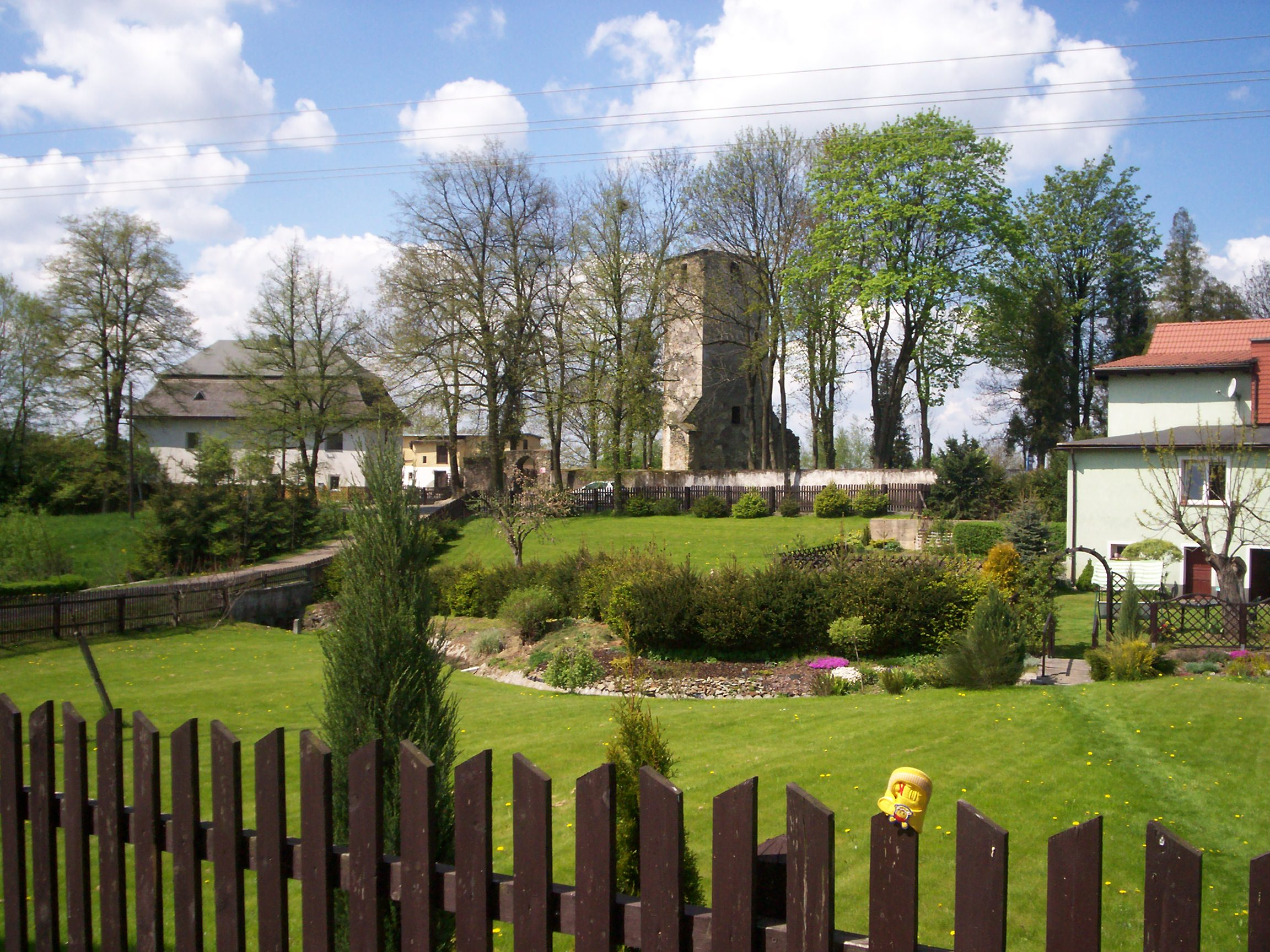

- Location within Poland
- Coordinates: 50°54′12″N 15°54′25″E
- Country: Poland
- Voivodeship: Lower Silesian
- Powiat: Karkonosze
- Gmina: Janowice Wielkie

Radomierz [raˈdɔmjɛʂ] is a village in the administrative district of Gmina Janowice Wielkie, within Karkonosze County, Lower Silesian Voivodeship, in south-western Poland.
