= Miedzianka, Lower Silesian Voivodeship =

Miedzianka
- Village
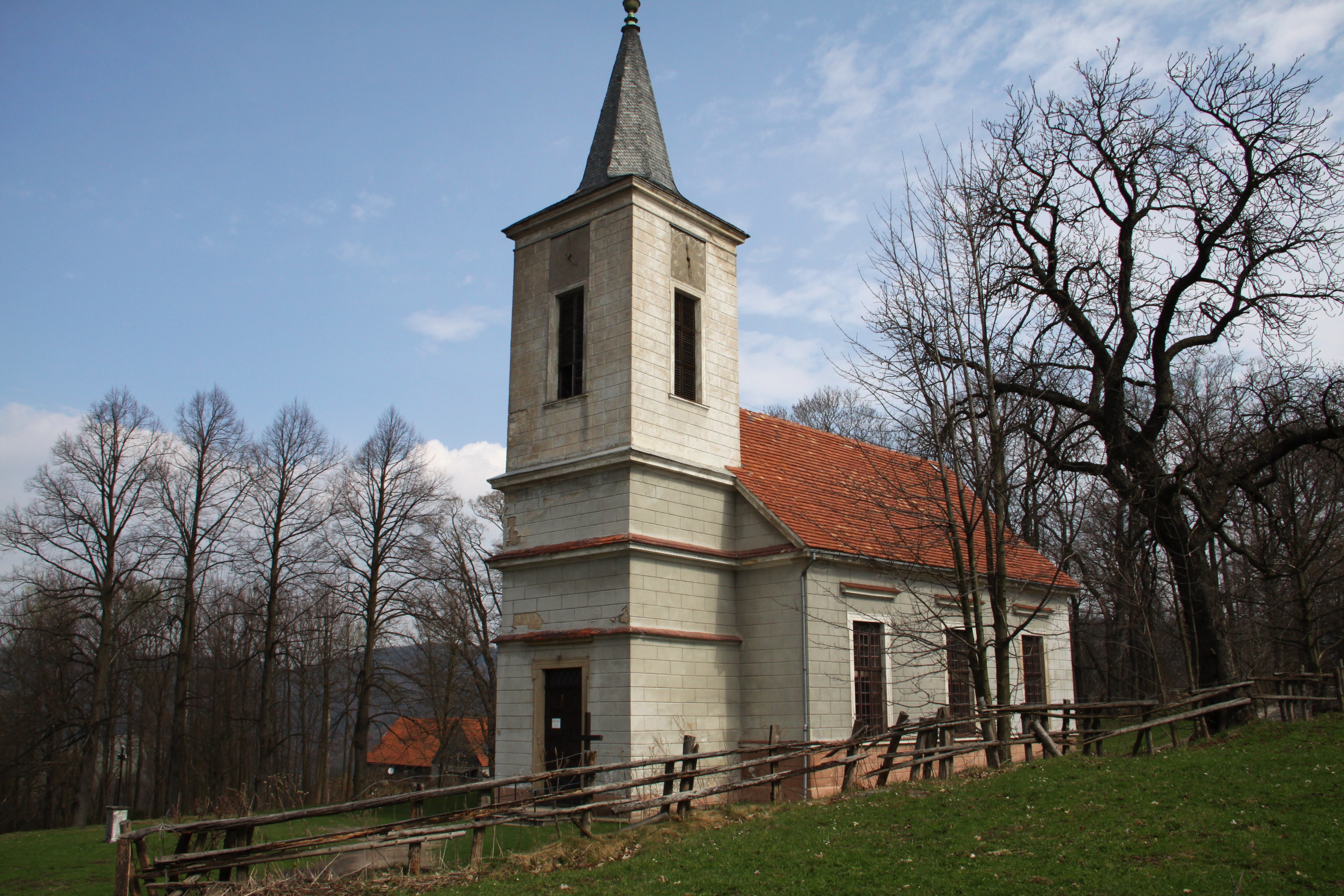
- Church of Saint John the Baptist

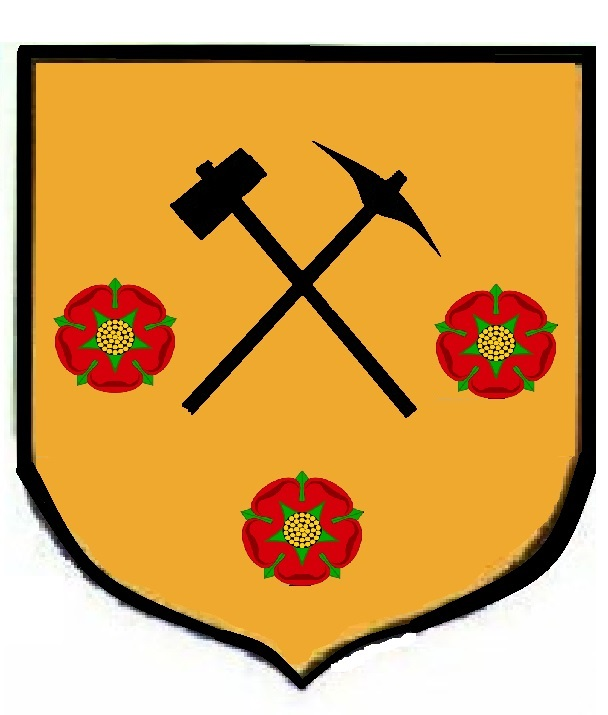
- Coat of arms

- Location within Poland
- Coordinates: 50°52′40″N 15°56′40″E
- Country: Poland
- Voivodeship: Lower Silesian
- County: Karkonosze
- Gmina: Janowice Wielkie
- First mentioned: 1311
- Elevation: 500 m (1,600 ft)

Population
  - Total: 80
- Time zone: UTC+1 (CET)
  - Summer (DST): UTC+2 (CEST)
- Vehicle registration: DJE

Miedzianka [mjɛˈd͡ʑaŋka] is a village (former town) in the administrative district of Gmina Janowice Wielkie, within Karkonosze County, Lower Silesian Voivodeship, in south-western Poland.

== History ==
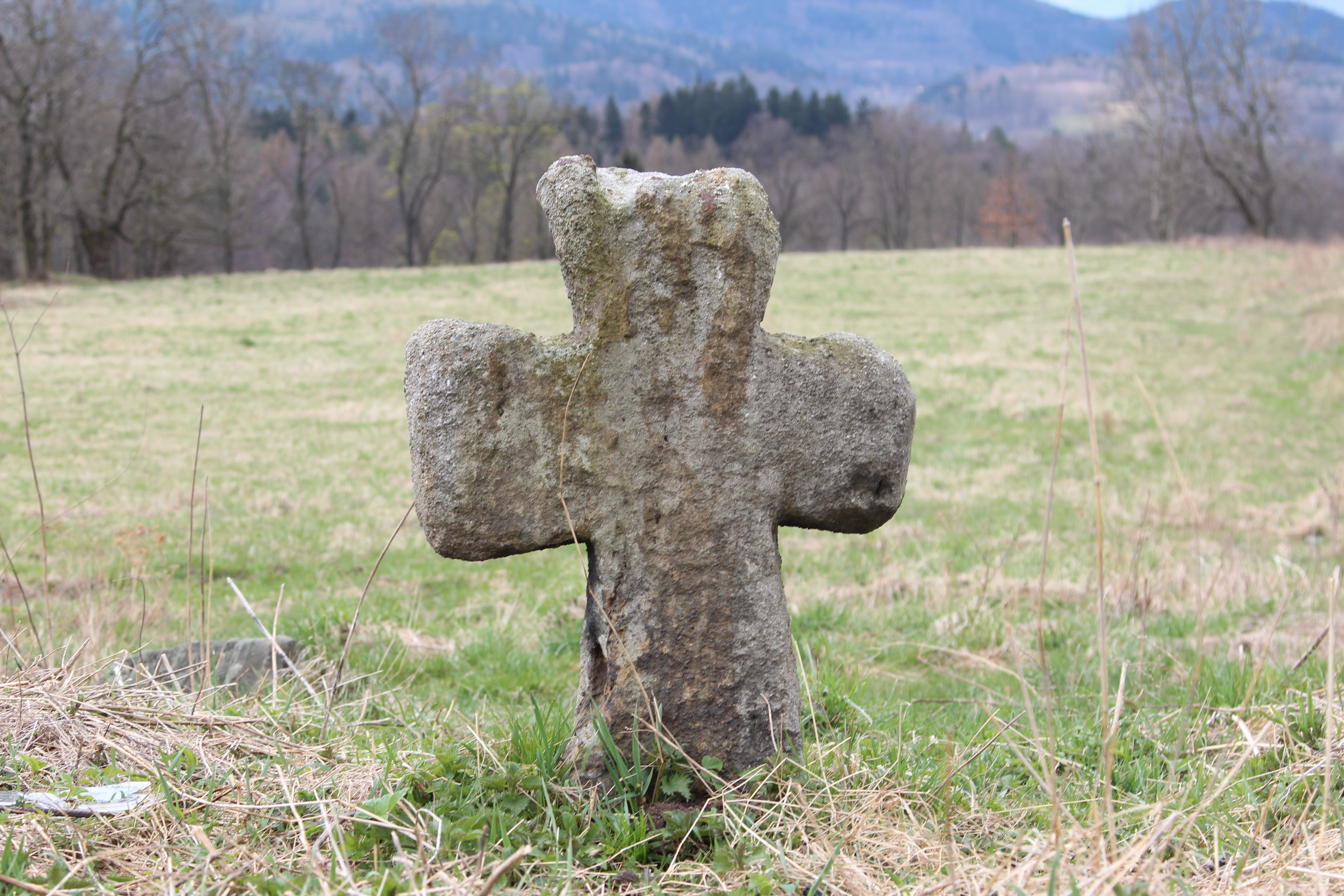
Old stone cross

The settlement was first mentioned under the Latin name Cupri fodina, meaning "copper mines", in 1311, when it was part of fragmented Piast-ruled Poland. It was split from Waltersdorf (Mniszków). It grew as a copper mining town, and received town rights in 1519. For a time, it was home to about 160 mining excavations and several metallurgical facilities, but this boom came to a halt by the end of the 16th century, as techniques proved insufficient for further exploitation. Around the 17th century the mining sector in Kupferberg began to grow again, under the patronage of a new owner, the count von Promnitz of Pszczyna. The city suffered several fires, in 1637, 1643, 1728 and 1824. In the early 18th century Kupferberg housed a regional mining office. In addition to mining, the town also had a renowned brewery, and from the mid-19th century, it became a popular tourist destination, known as the second most highly located town in the Sudeten Mountains.

In the 18th century it was annexed by Prussia, and from 1871 it was part of the German Empire. After Germany's defeat in World War II, it became again part of Poland and was renamed Miedzianka. It became a site of a secret Red Army mining operation, as Soviet experts expected to develop a uranium mine there. From 1949 to the 1950s about 600 tons of uranium were sent from Miedzianka to the USSR. Extensive and wanton mining caused much damage to the town, and when the uranium deposits proved to be insufficient for continued exploitation, the local economy collapsed amid the government's attempts to hide the uranium excavation. The mine was publicly labelled as a "paper factory"; Polish and Soviet troops and secret police guarded the mine, and the miners who could not keep the secret were executed.

In the late 1960s, a planned destruction of Miedzianka began, with demolitions of selected buildings, and a ban on repairs of remaining ones. Around 1972, most inhabitants were resettled to the town of Jelenia Góra.
