= Gmina Janowice Wielkie =

Gmina Janowice Wielkie Janowice Wielkie Commune
- Gmina
- Coat of arms
- Interactive map of Gmina Janowice Wielkie
- Coordinates (Janowice Wielkie): 50°53′N 15°55′E
- Country: Poland
- Voivodeship: Lower Silesian
- County: Karkonosze
- Seat: Janowice Wielkie
- Sołectwos: Janowice Wielkie, Komarno, Miedzianka, Mniszków, Radomierz, Trzcińsko

Area
  - Total: 58.09 km^{2} (22.43 sq mi)

Population (2019-06-30)
  - Total: 4,302
  - Density: 74.06/km^{2} (191.8/sq mi)
- Website: http://www.janowicewielkie.pl/

Gmina Janowice Wielkie is a rural gmina (administrative district) in Karkonosze County, Lower Silesian Voivodeship, in south-western Poland. Its seat is the village of Janowice Wielkie, which lies approximately 14 kilometres (9 mi) east of Jelenia Góra and 84 km (52 mi) west of the regional capital Wrocław.

The gmina covers an area of 58.09 square kilometres (22.43 sq mi); as of 2019, its total population is 4,302.

== Neighbouring gminas ==
Gmina Janowice Wielkie is bordered by the towns of Jelenia Góra and Wojcieszów and the gminas of Bolków, Jeżów Sudecki, Kamienna Góra, Marciszów, Mysłakowice and Świerzawa.

== Villages ==
The gmina contains the villages of Janowice Wielkie, Komarno, Miedzianka, Mniszków, Radomierz and Trzcińsko.

== Twin towns – sister cities ==
Gmina Janowice Wielkie is twinned with:

- Bruchhausen-Vilsen, Germany
- Rádlo, Czech Republic
