= Trzcińsko =

- Village
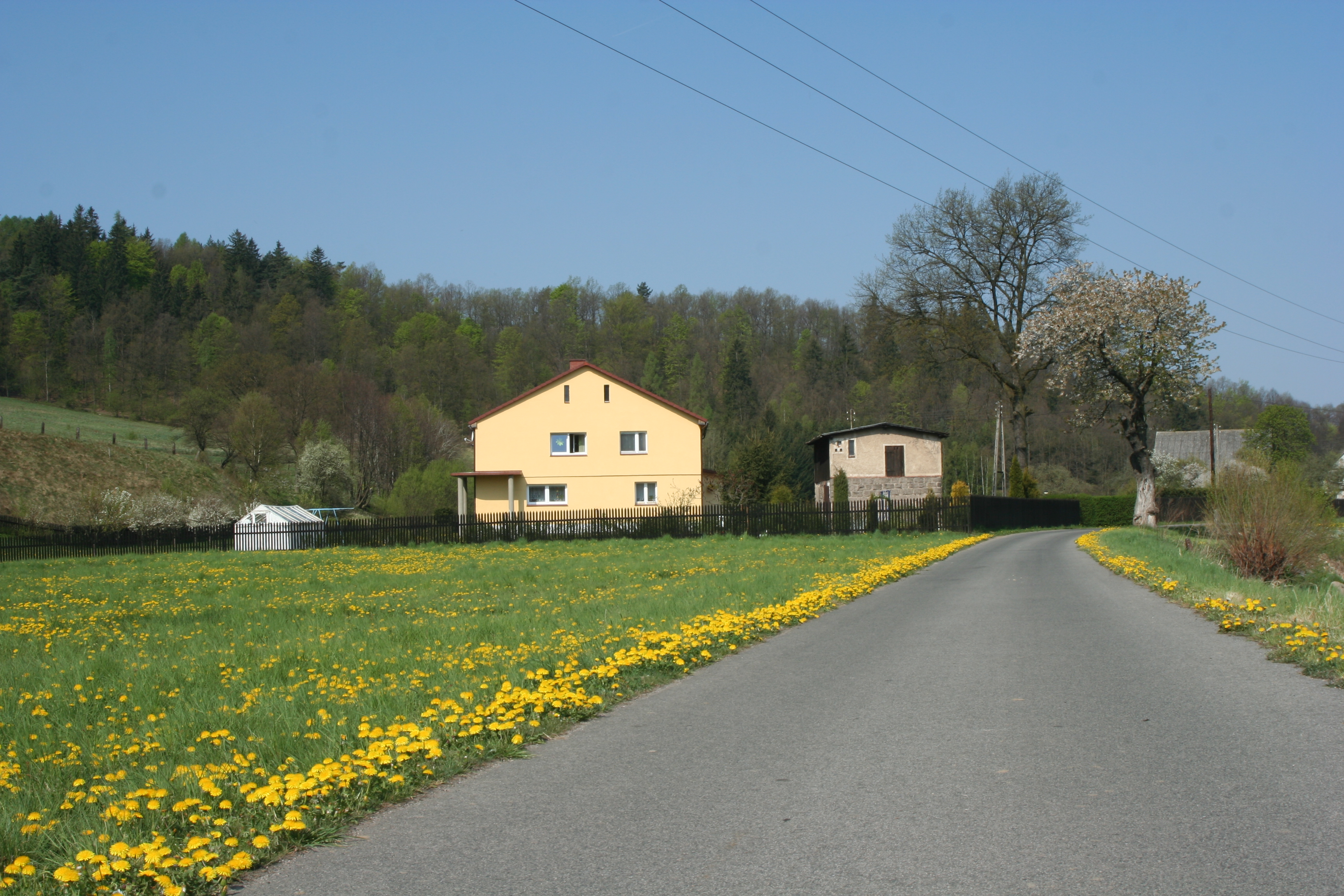
- Houses

- Location within Poland
- Coordinates: 50°52′26″N 15°52′29″E
- Country: Poland
- Voivodeship: Lower Silesian
- Powiat: Karkonosze
- Gmina: Janowice Wielkie

Trzcińsko [ˈtʂt͡ɕiɲskɔ] is a village in the administrative district of Gmina Janowice Wielkie, within Karkonosze County, Lower Silesian Voivodeship, in south-western Poland.

== Gallery ==
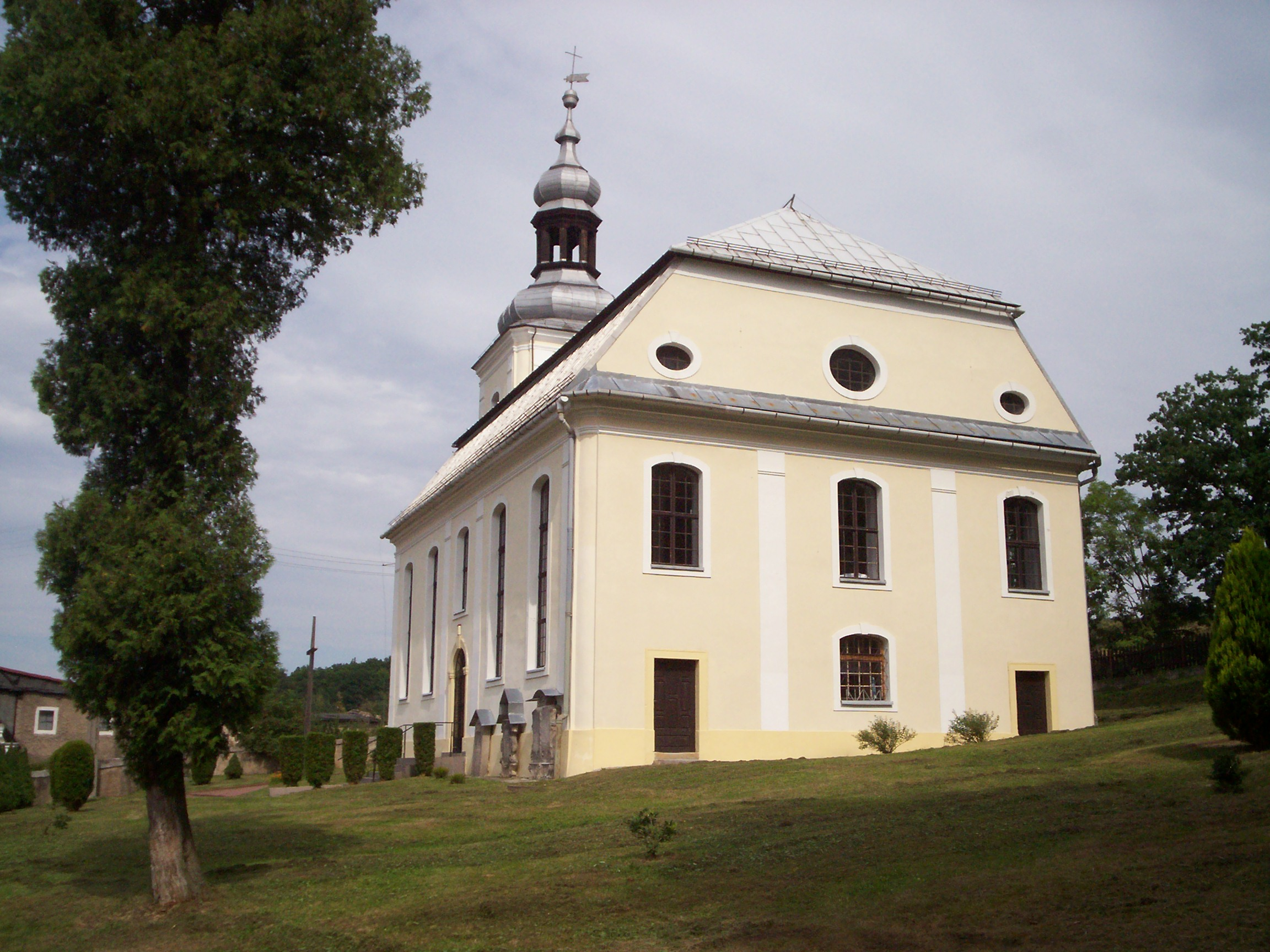
Church of Our Lady of Cestochowa

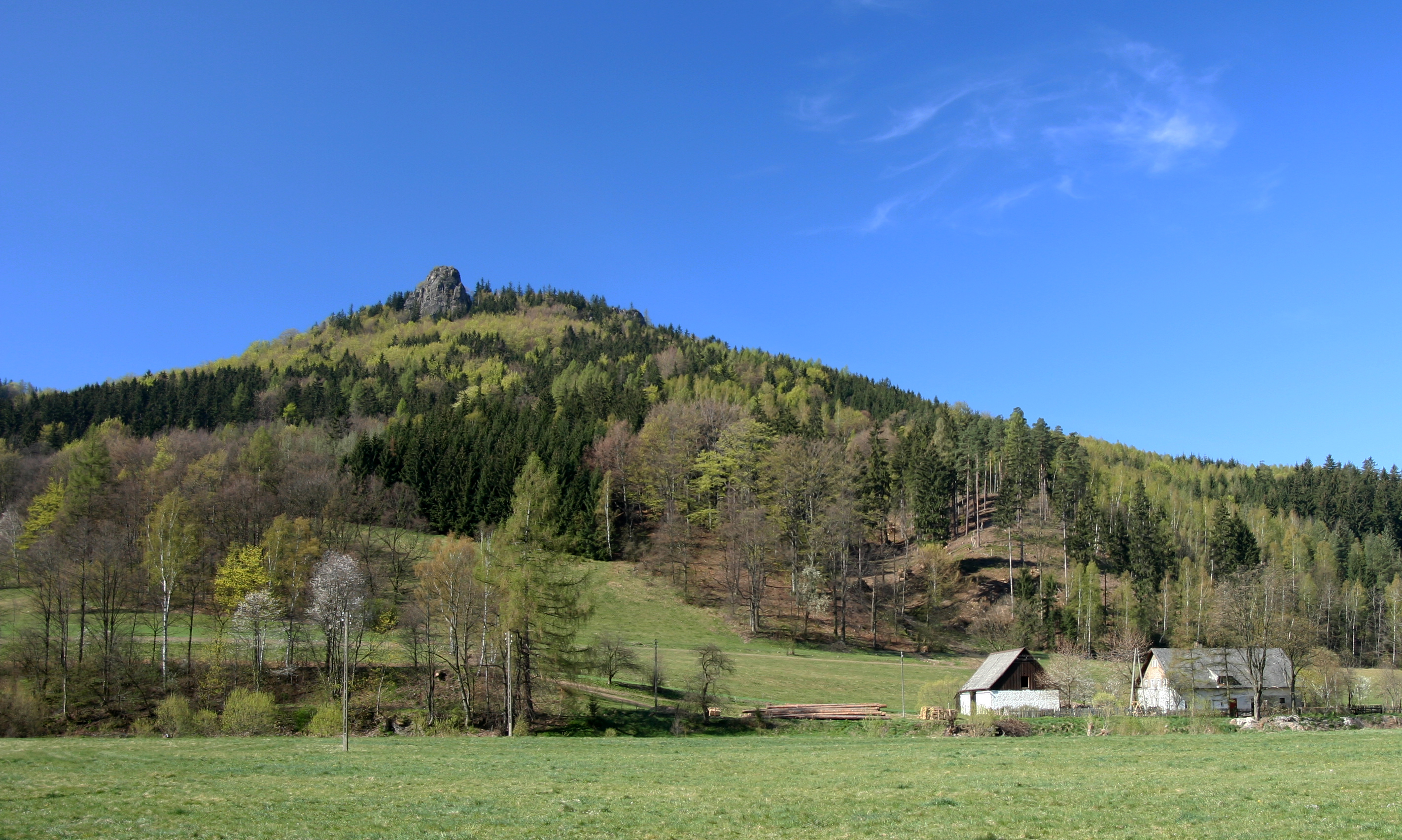
Houses below Sokolik hill

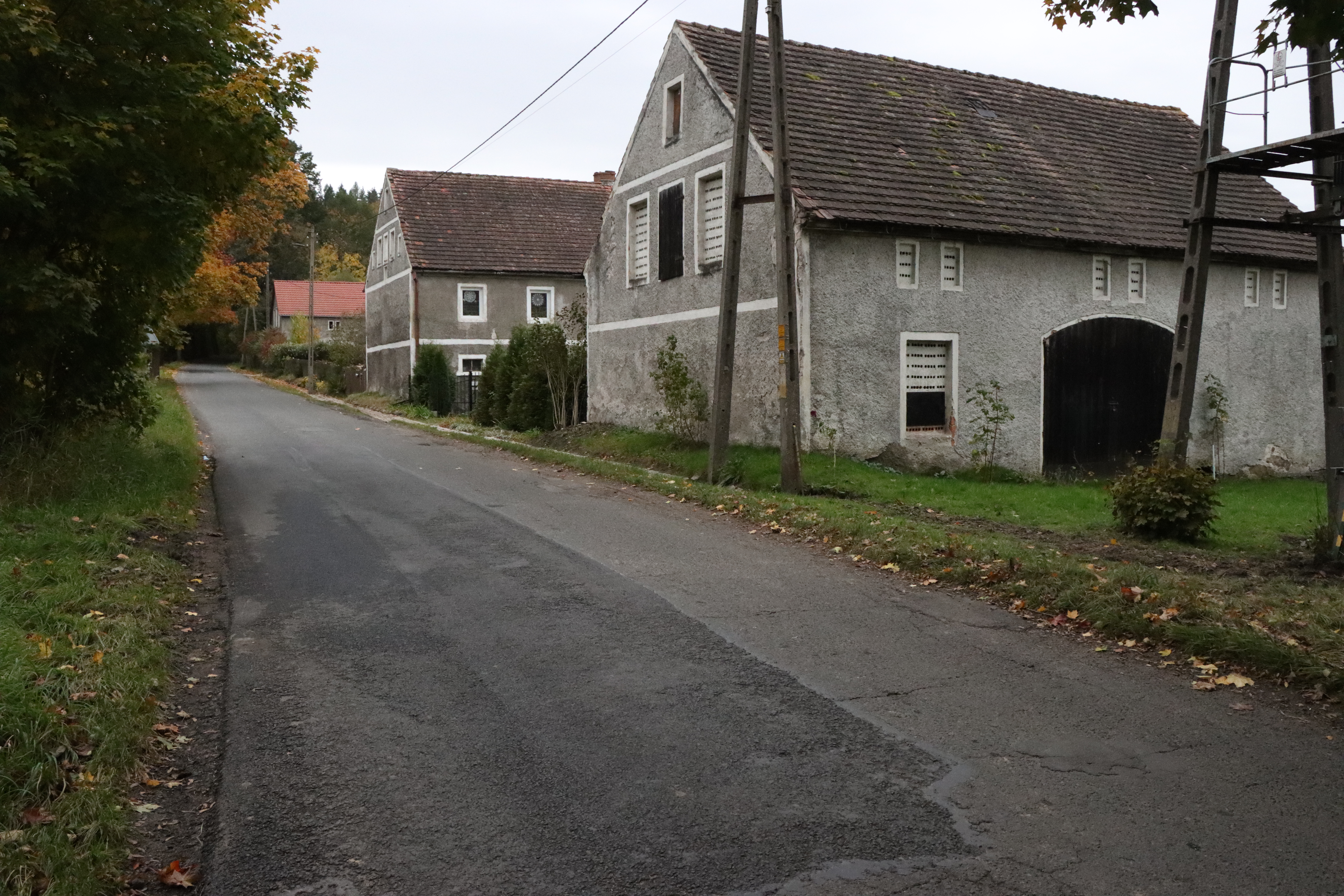
Houses by road

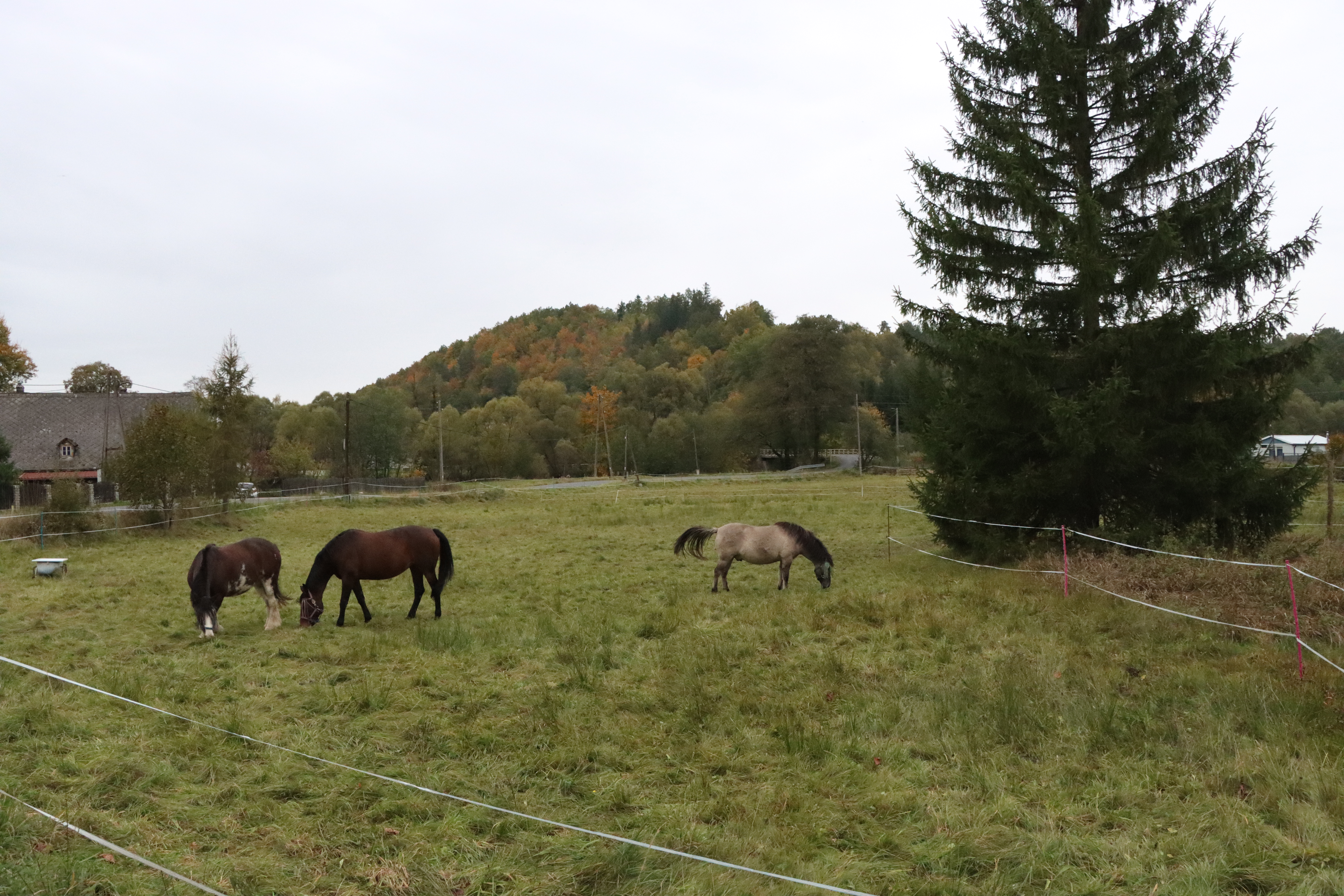
Horses on pasture within the village
