= Komarno, Lower Silesian Voivodeship =

Komarno
- Village
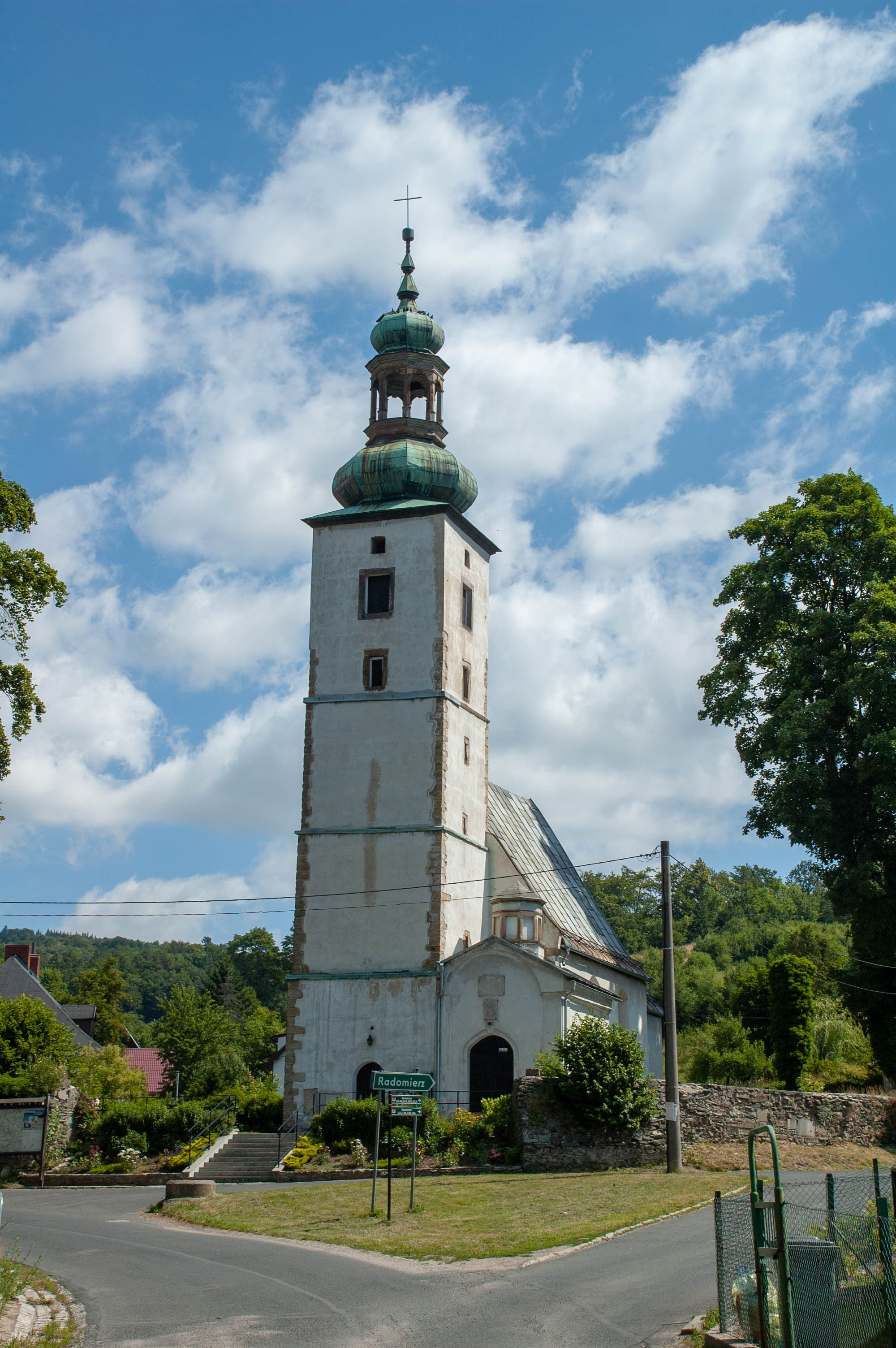

- Location within Poland
- Coordinates: 50°55′30″N 15°52′09″E
- Country: Poland
- Voivodeship: Lower Silesian
- County: Karkonosze
- Gmina: Janowice Wielkie

Population
  - Total: 720

Komarno [kɔˈmarnɔ] is a village in the administrative district of Gmina Janowice Wielkie, within Karkonosze County, Lower Silesian Voivodeship, in south-western Poland.

== Gallery ==
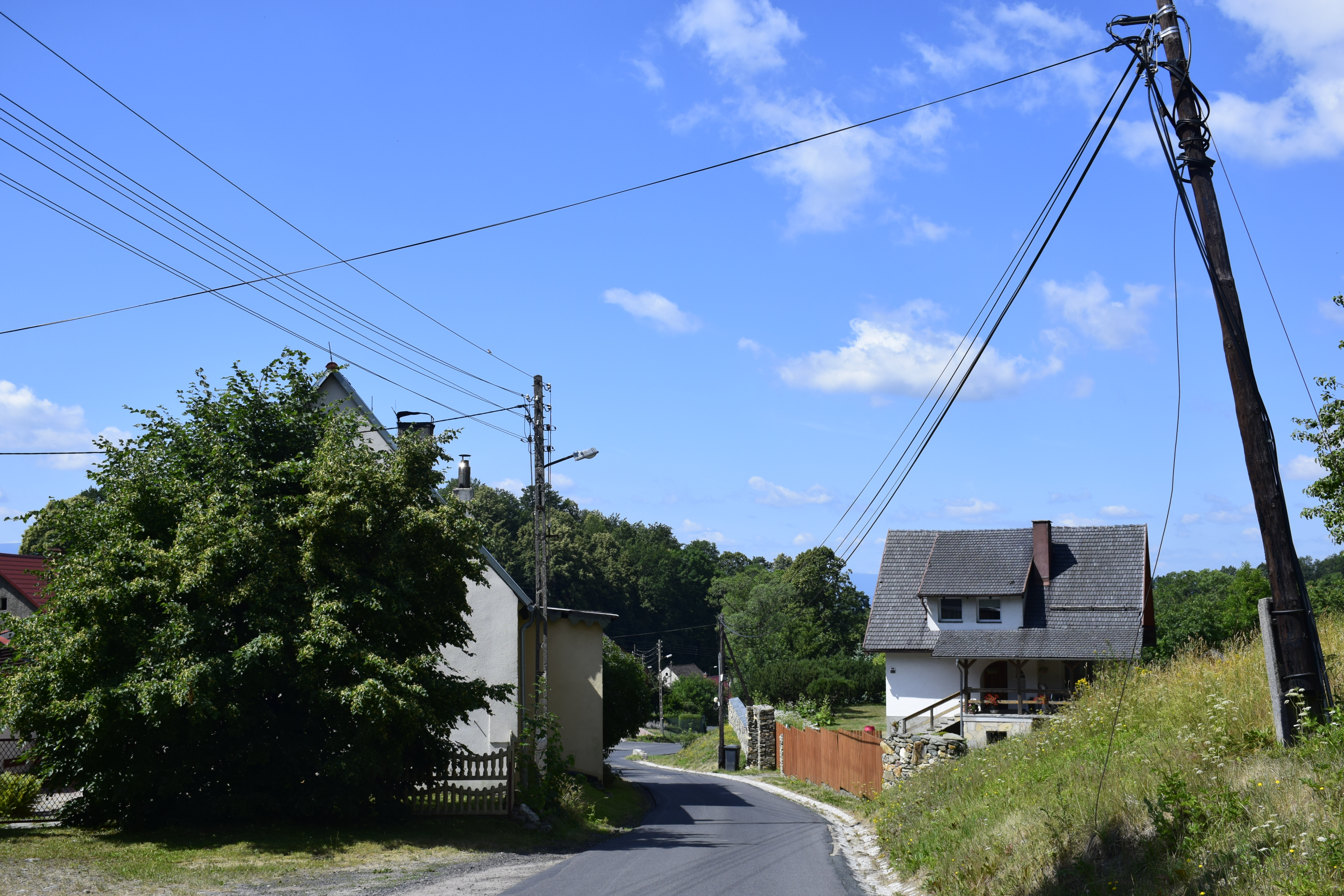

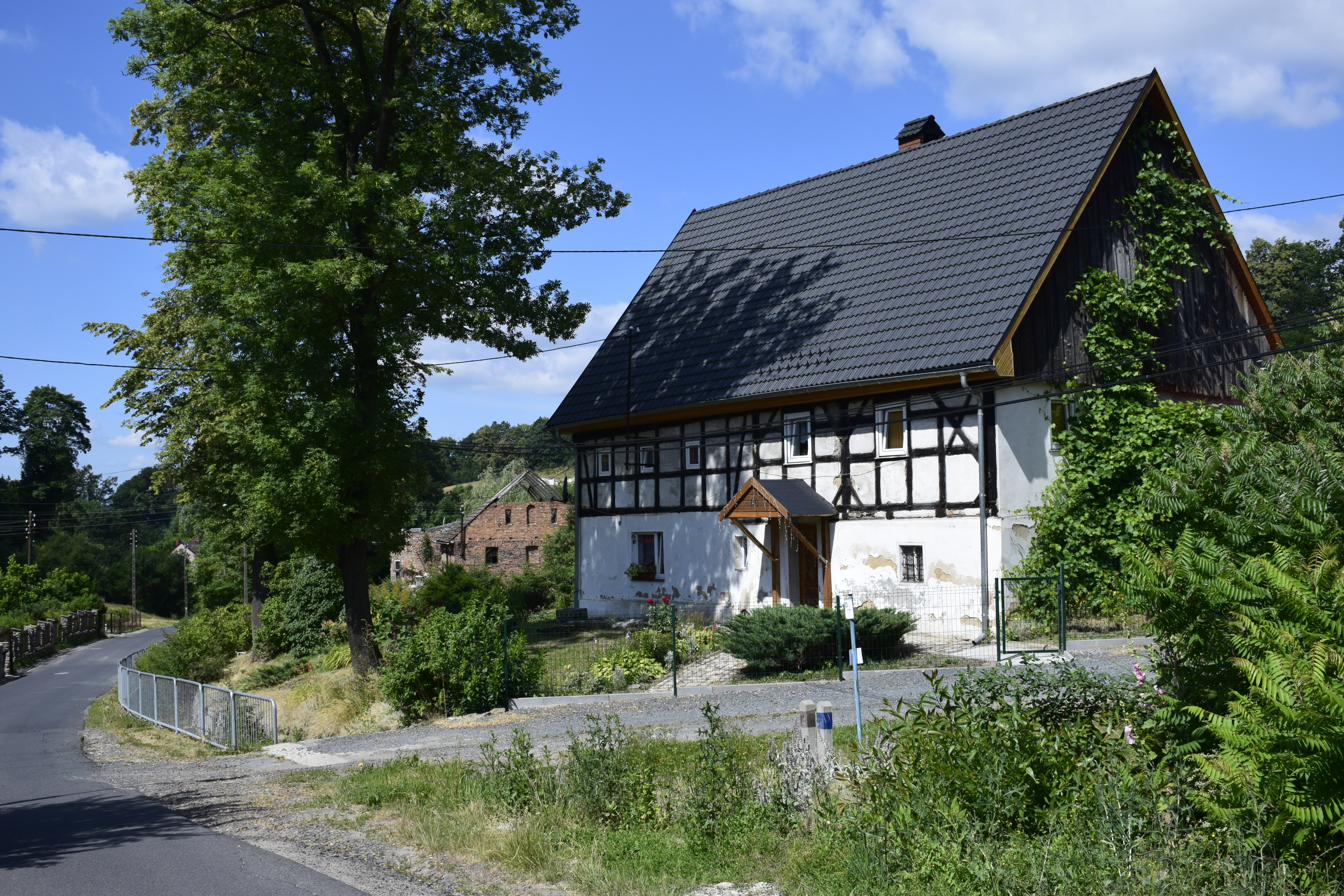

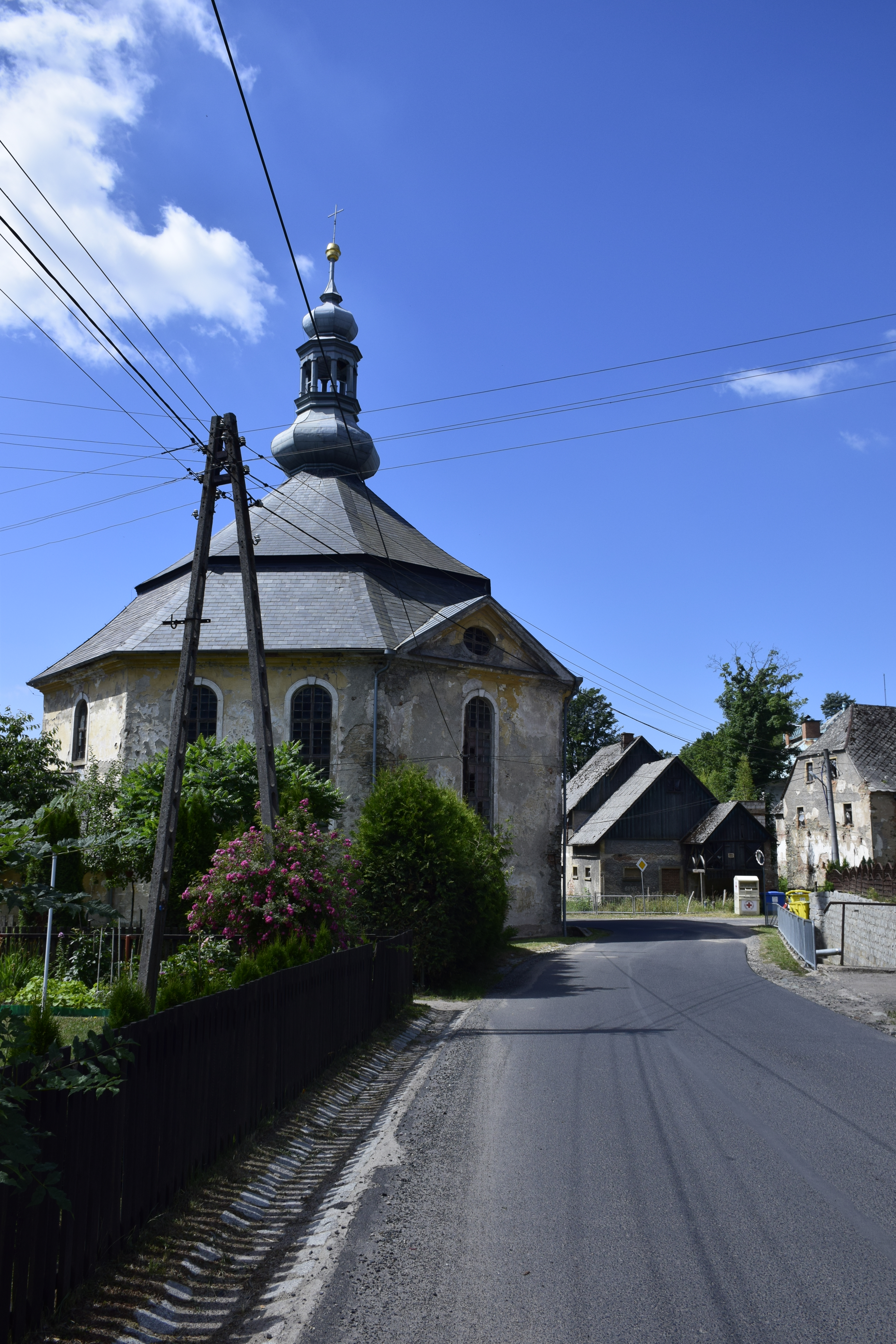

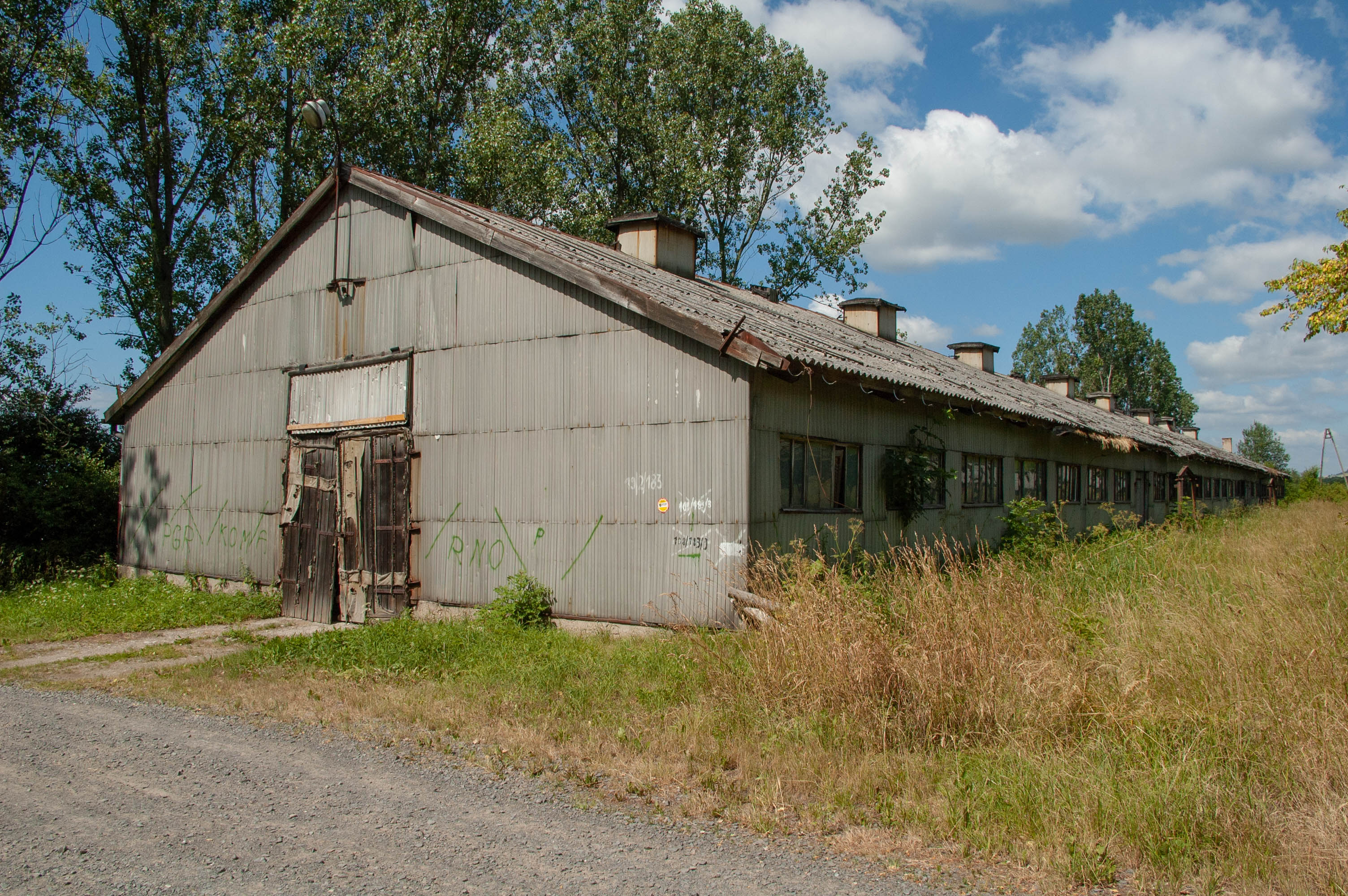

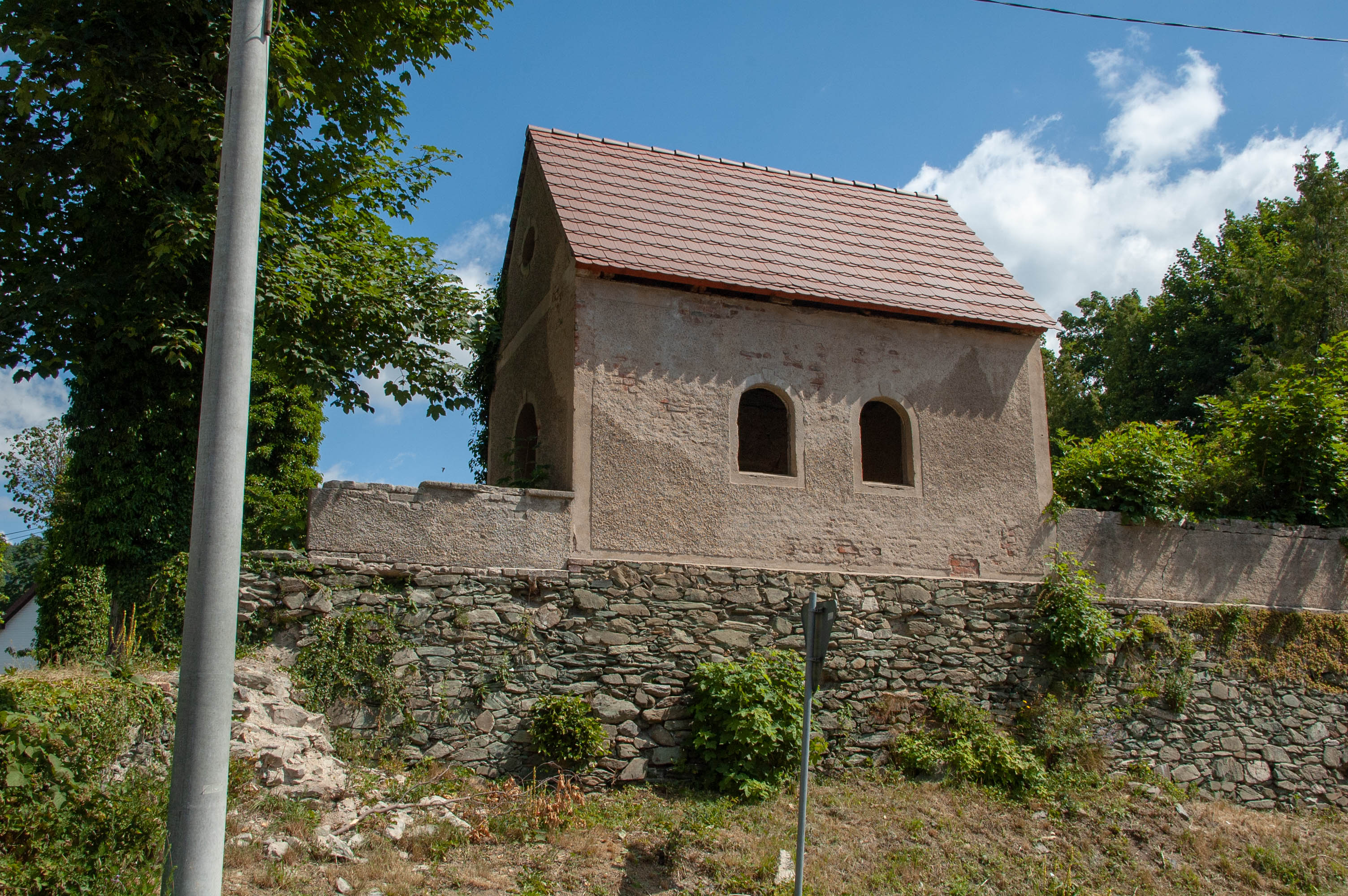
