= Janowice Wielkie =

- Village
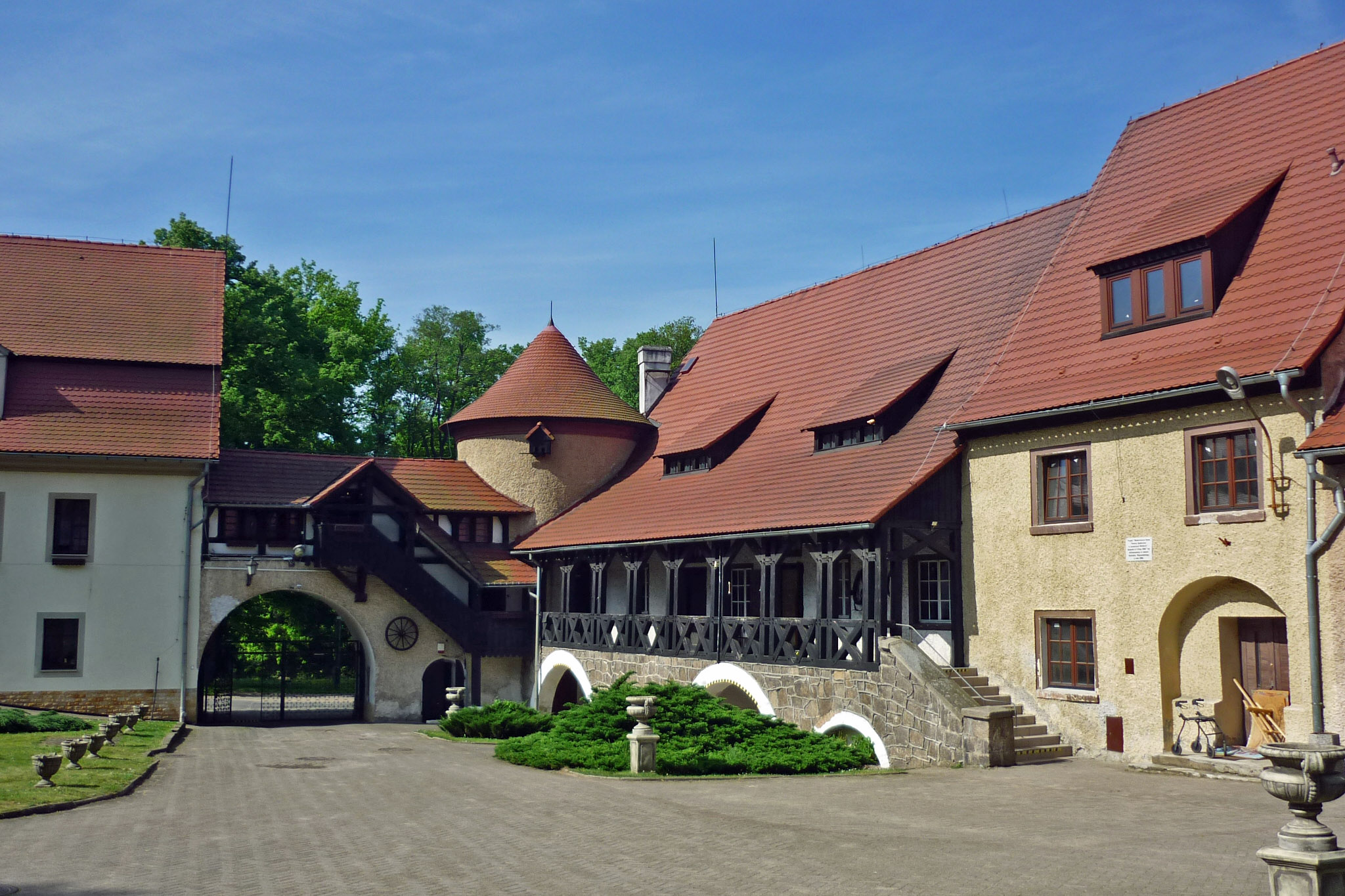
- Palace courtyard

- Location within Poland
- Coordinates: 50°53′N 15°55′E
- Country: Poland
- Voivodeship: Lower Silesian
- County: Karkonosze
- Gmina: Janowice Wielkie

Population
  - Total: 2,100
- Time zone: UTC+1 (CET)
  - Summer (DST): UTC+2 (CEST)
- Postal code: 58-520
- Vehicle registration: DJE

Janowice Wielkie [janɔˈvit͡sɛ ˈvjɛlkʲɛ] (German: Jannowitz) is a village in Karkonosze County, Lower Silesian Voivodeship, in south-western Poland. It is the seat of the administrative district (gmina) called Gmina Janowice Wielkie.

It is a summer resort in the foothills of the Silesian or Great Mountains. From here is a direct route south to Bolczów Castle, elevation 561 m or 1,841 ft, the imposing ruins of an old castle destroyed by the Swedes in 1643.

The village is served by Janowice Wielkie railway station.

== Photo gallery ==
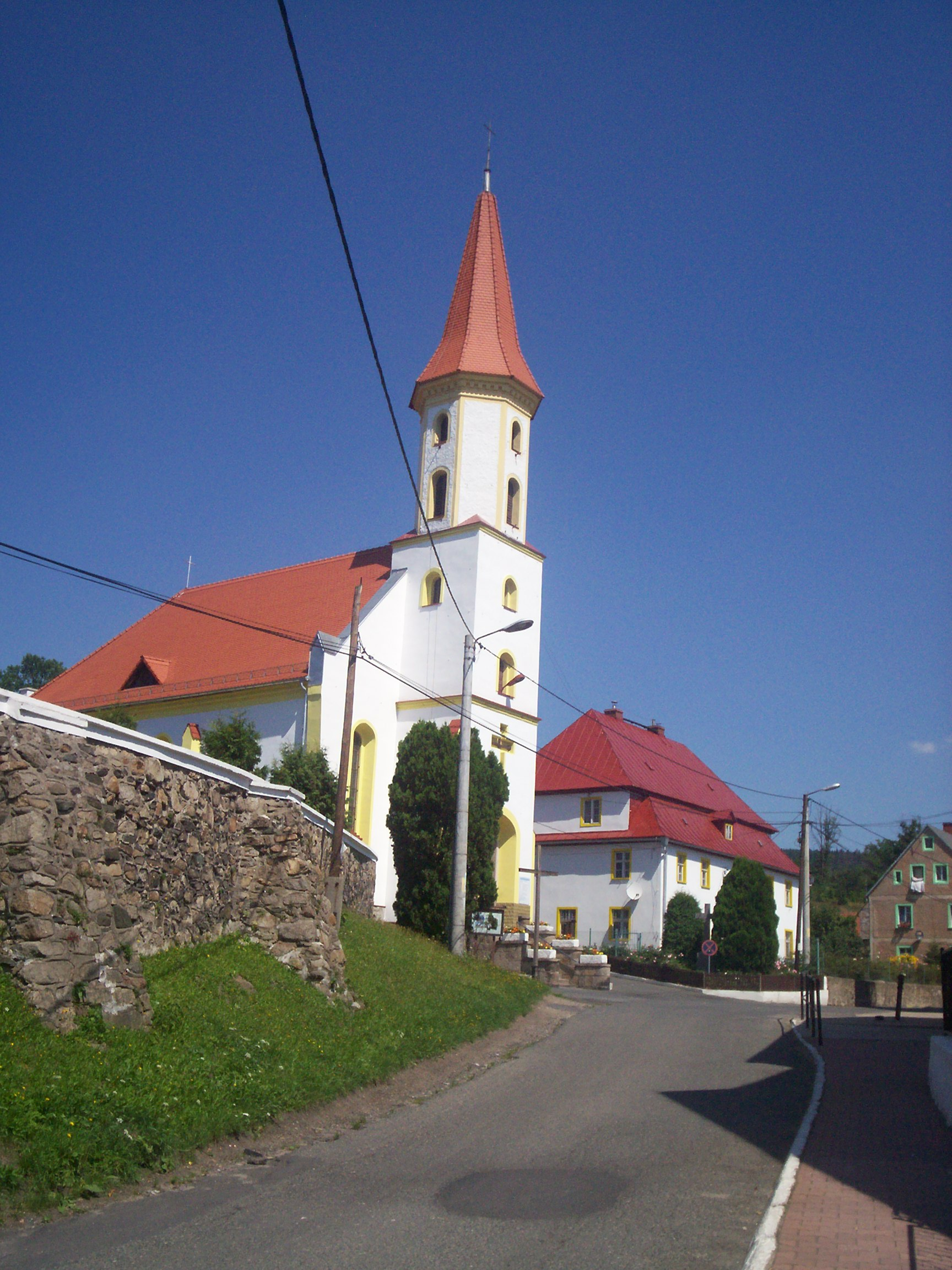
Christ the King Church

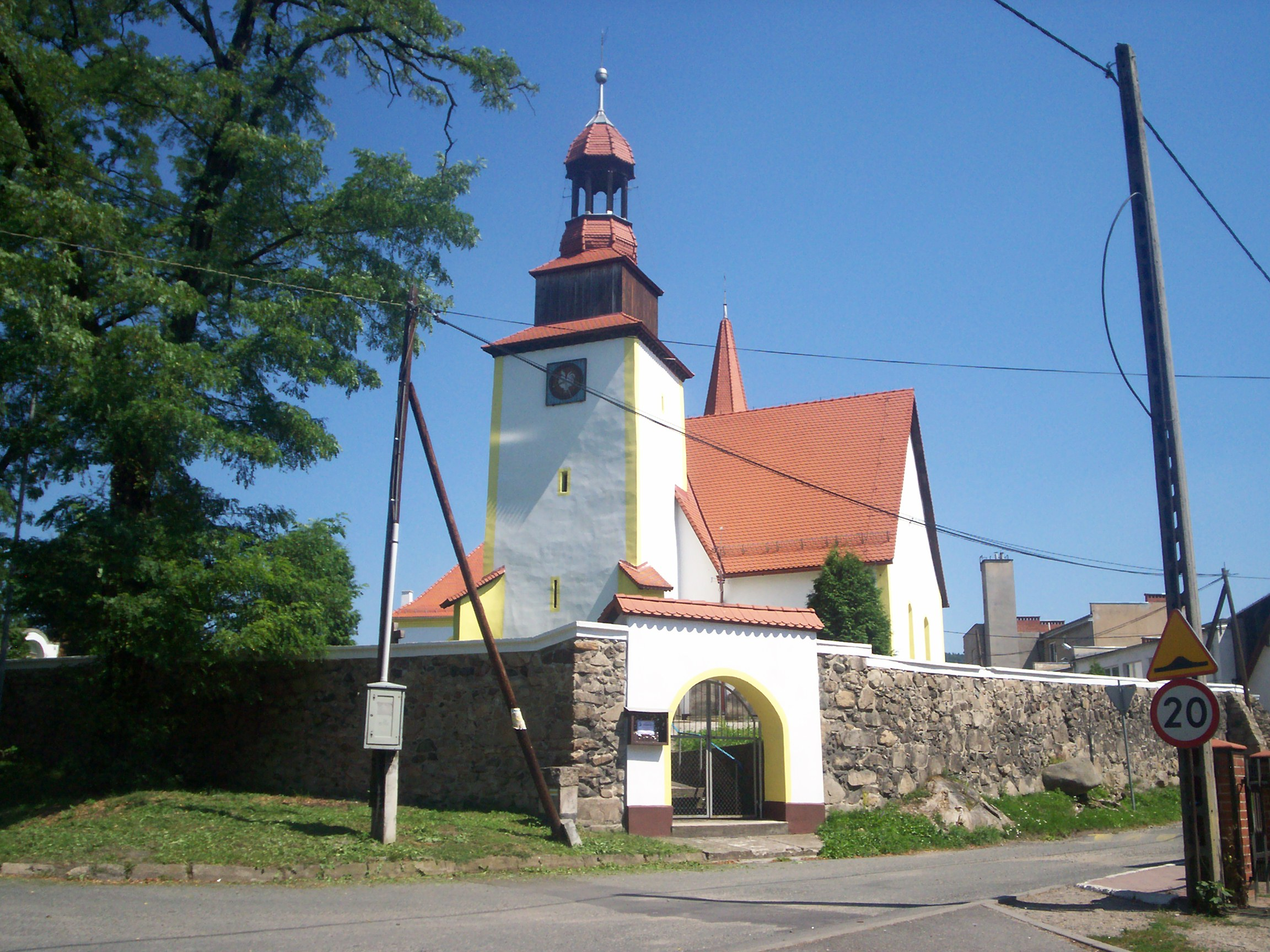
Assumption of Mary Church

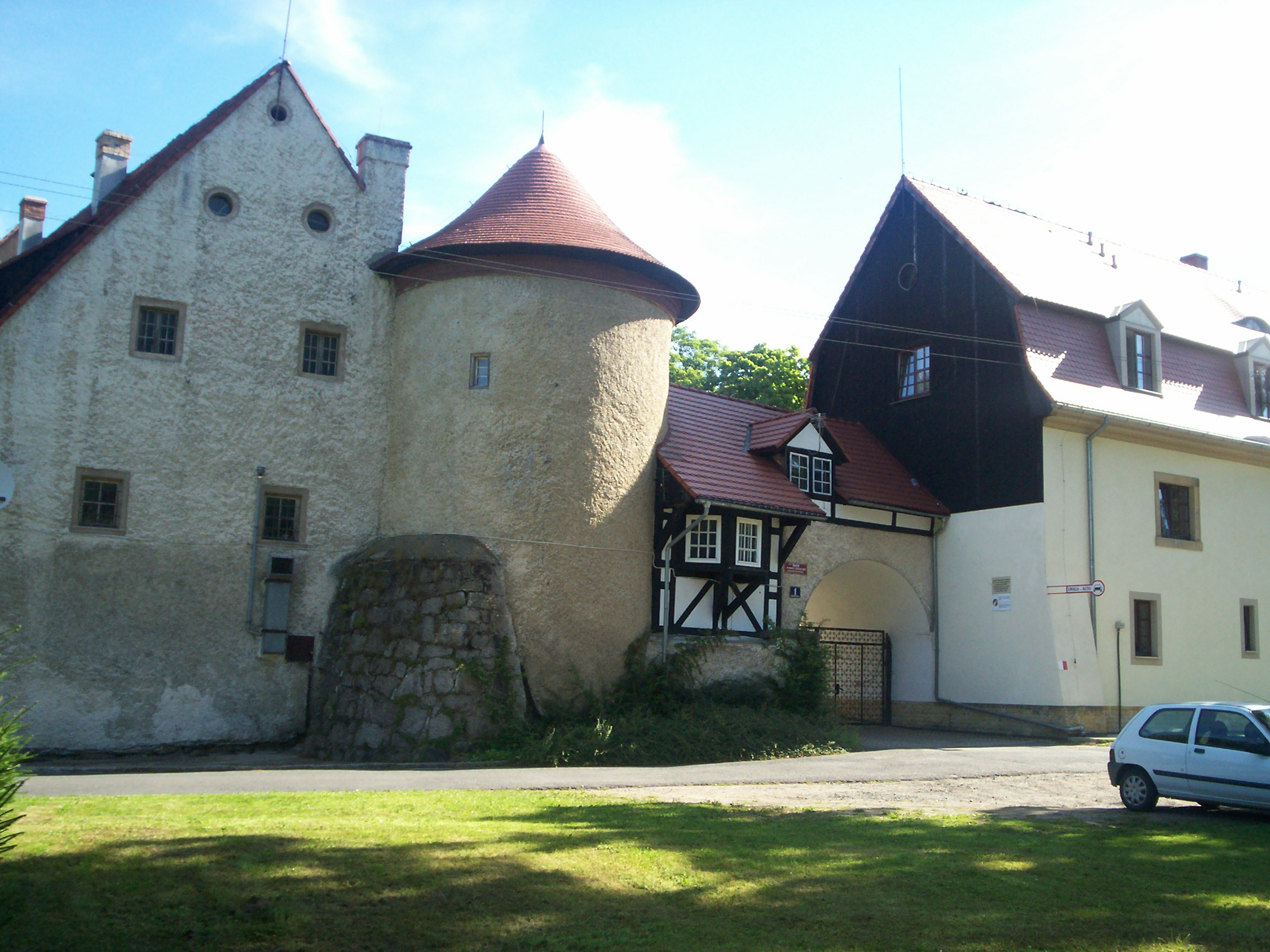
Former Schaffgotsch Palace, now a nursing home

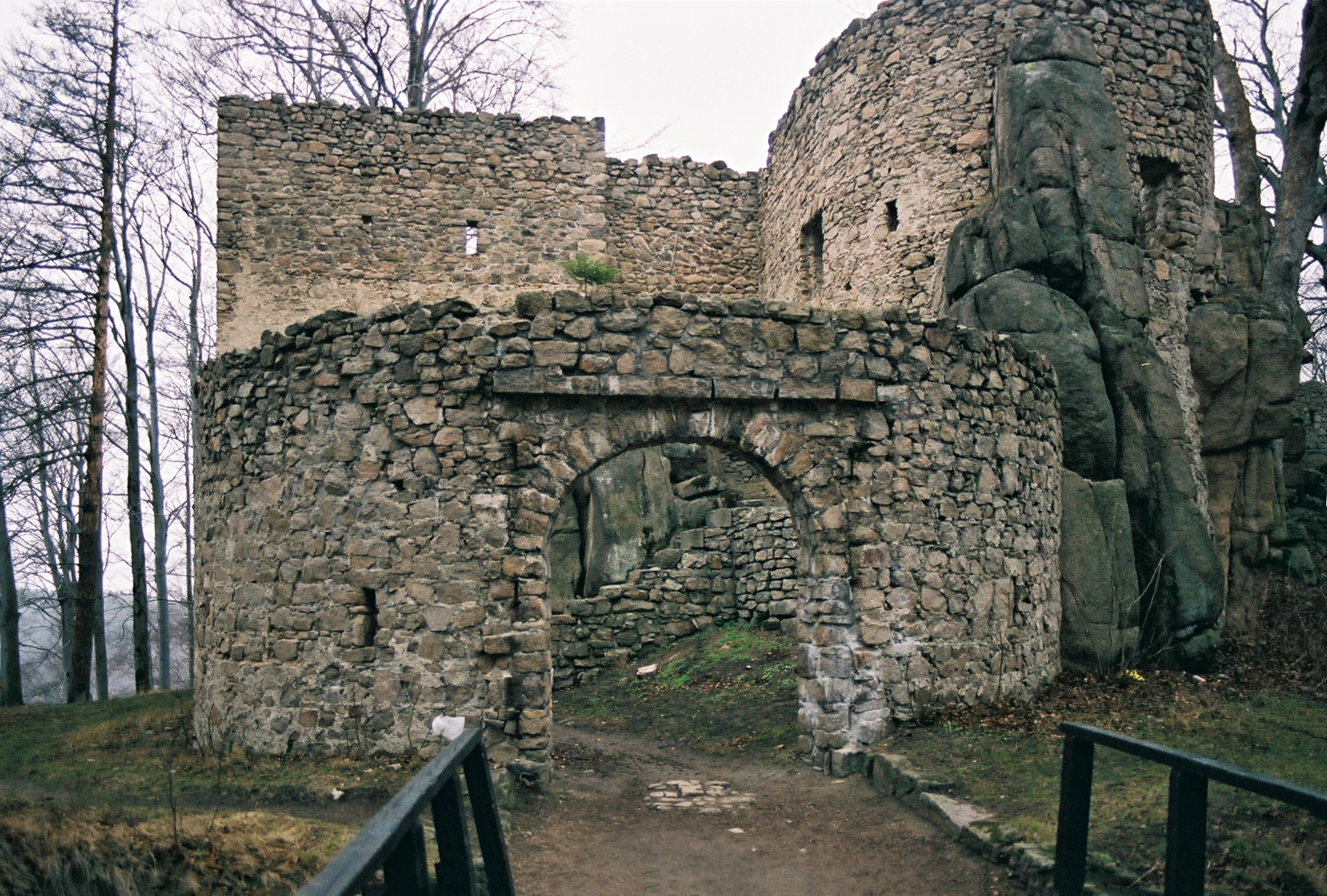
Ruins of fourteenth-century Bolcz Castle

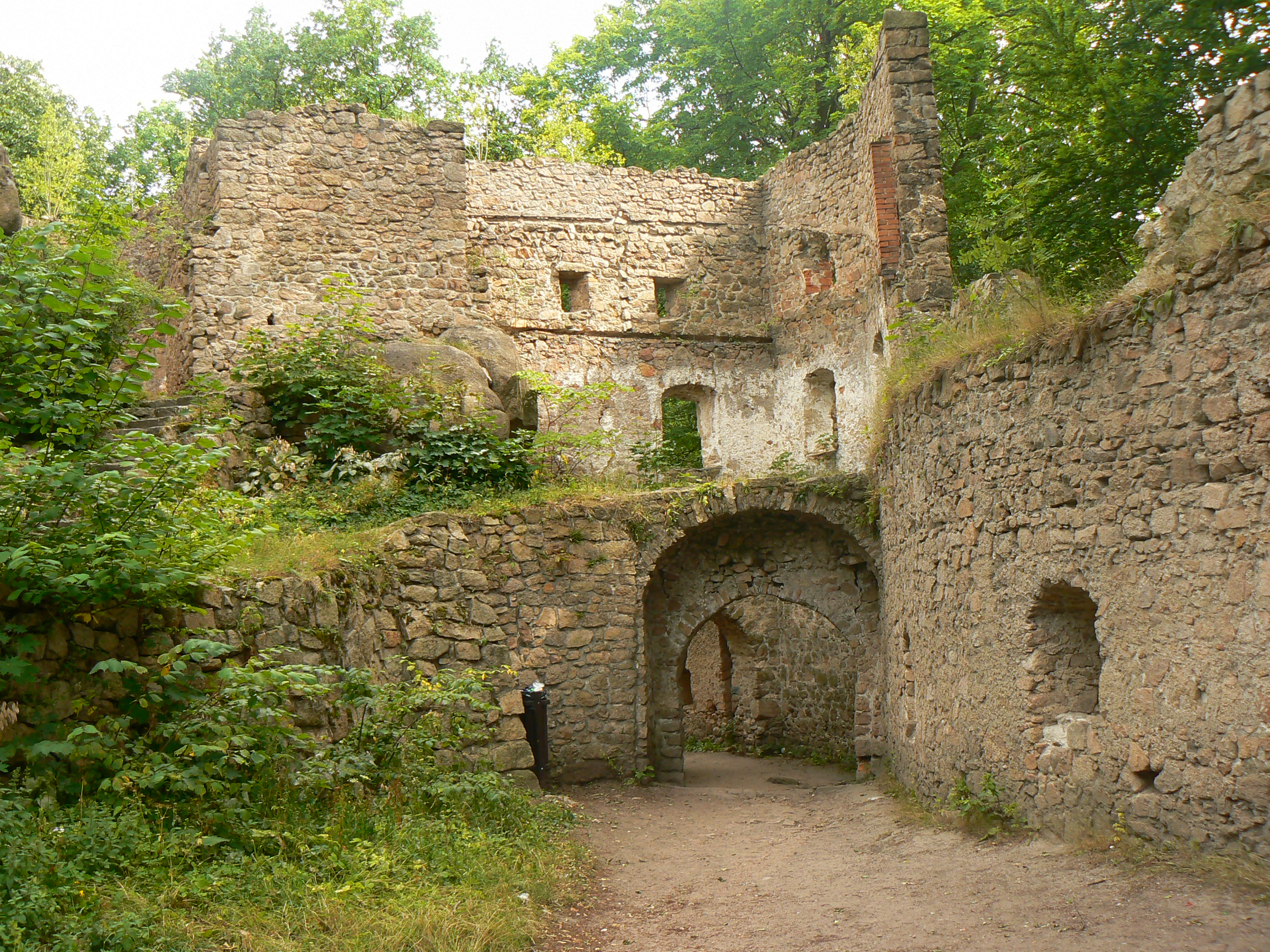
Bolczów Castle

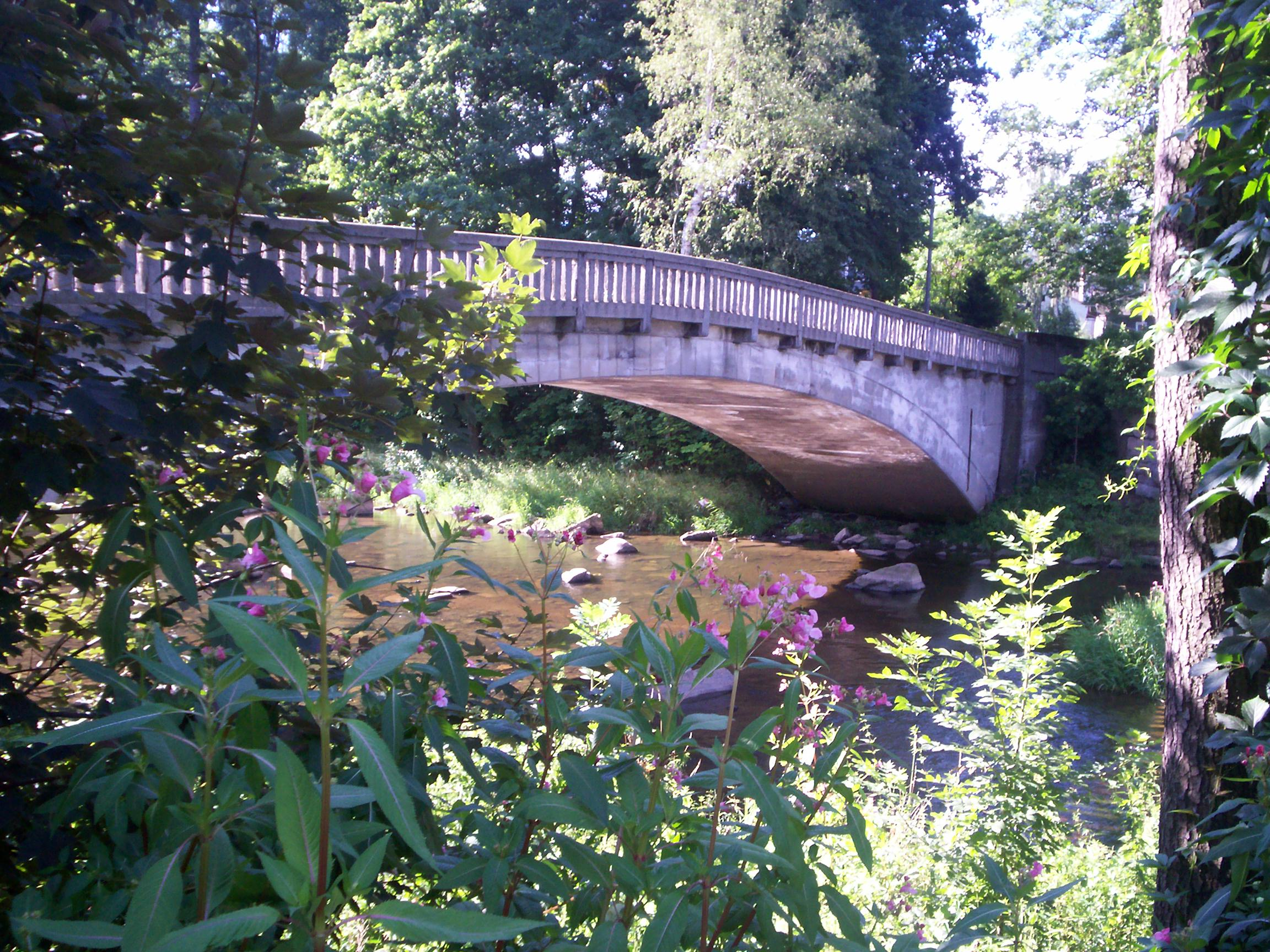
Baroque stone bridge over the Bóbr River

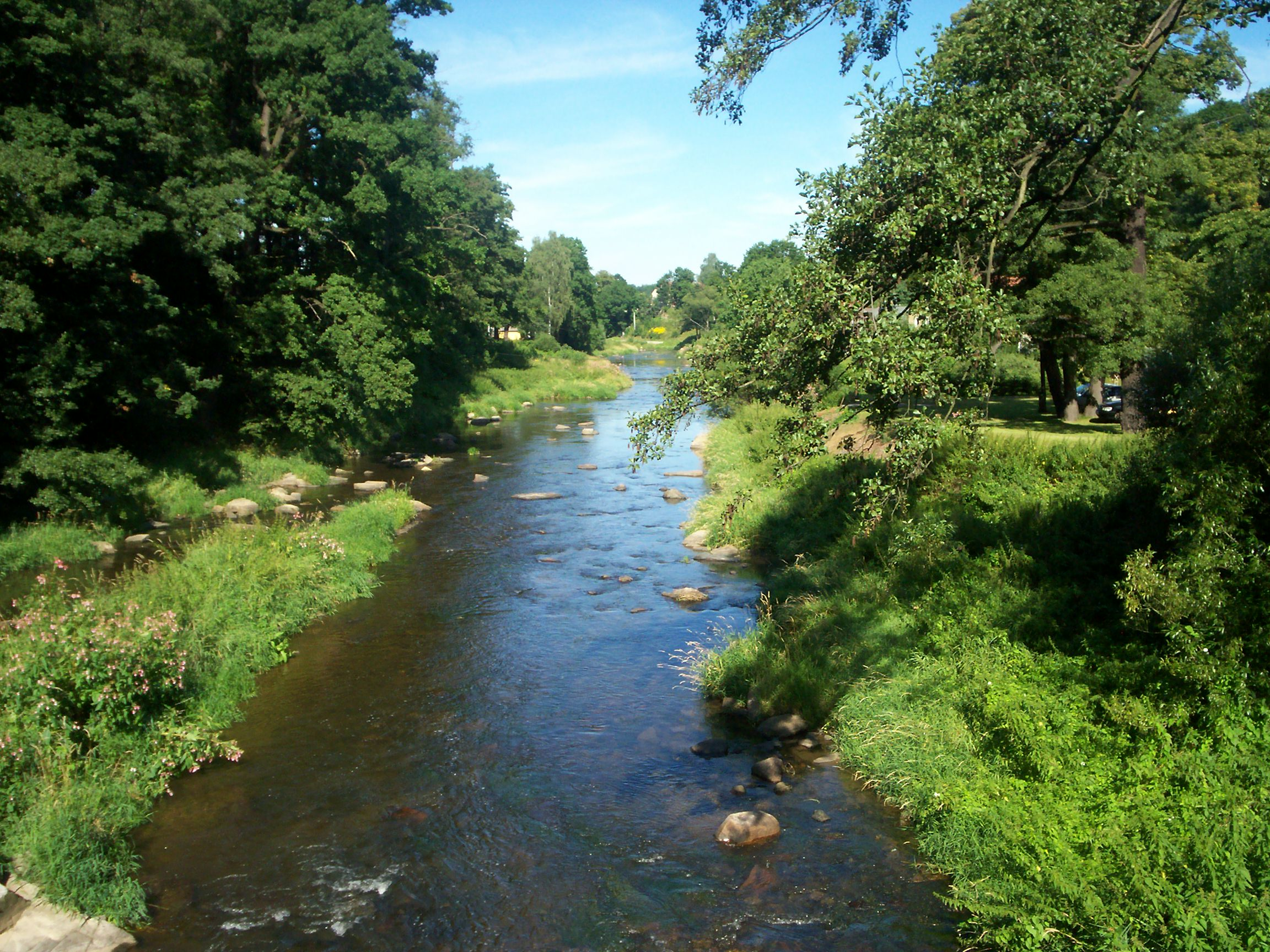
The Bóbr River in Janowice Wielkie

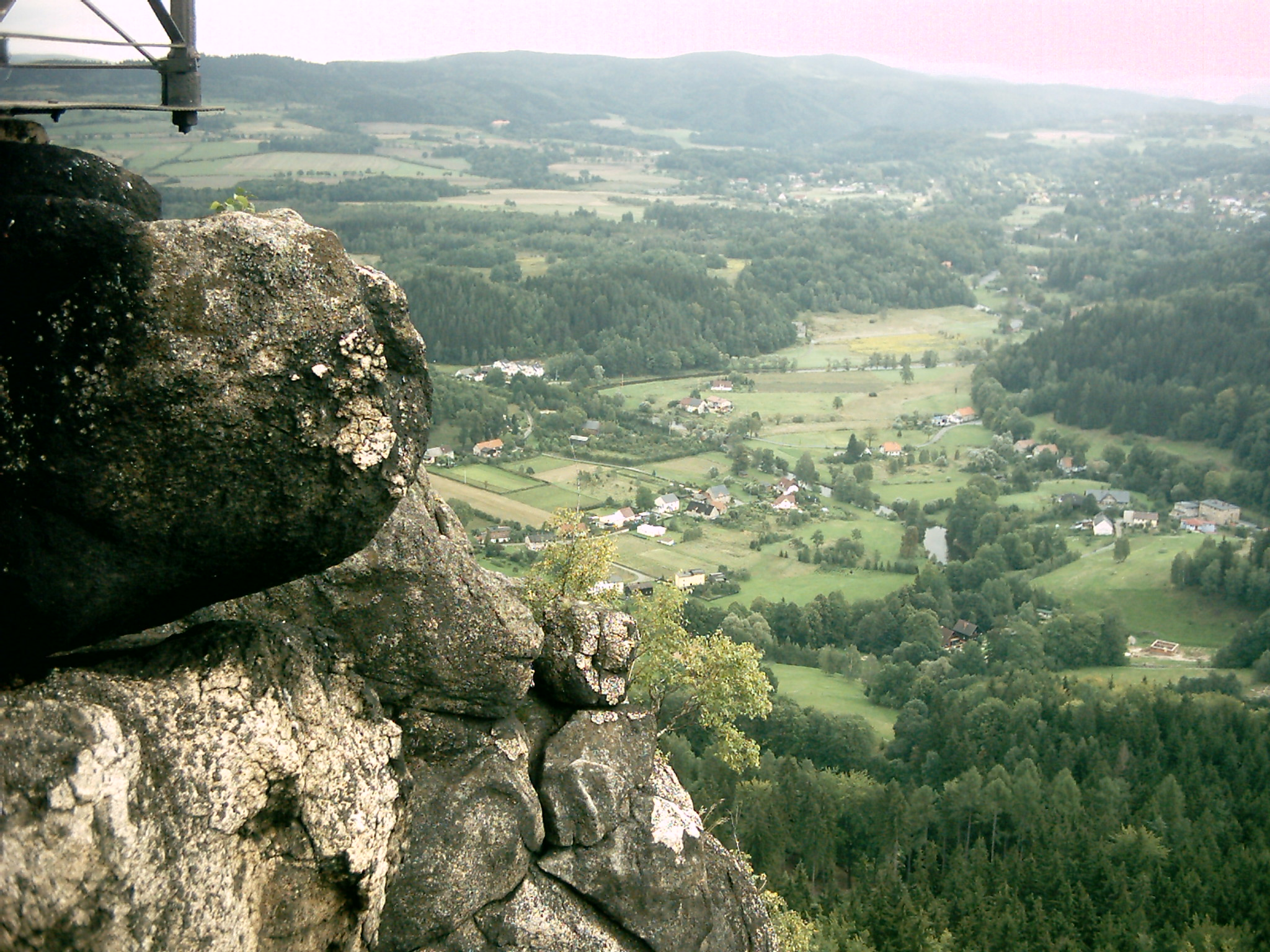
Panorama of Janowice from Mount Sokolik

== Notable people ==
- Constantin zu Stolberg-Wernigerode (1843–1905), Prussian politician
