= Mniszków, Lower Silesian Voivodeship =

Mniszków
- Village
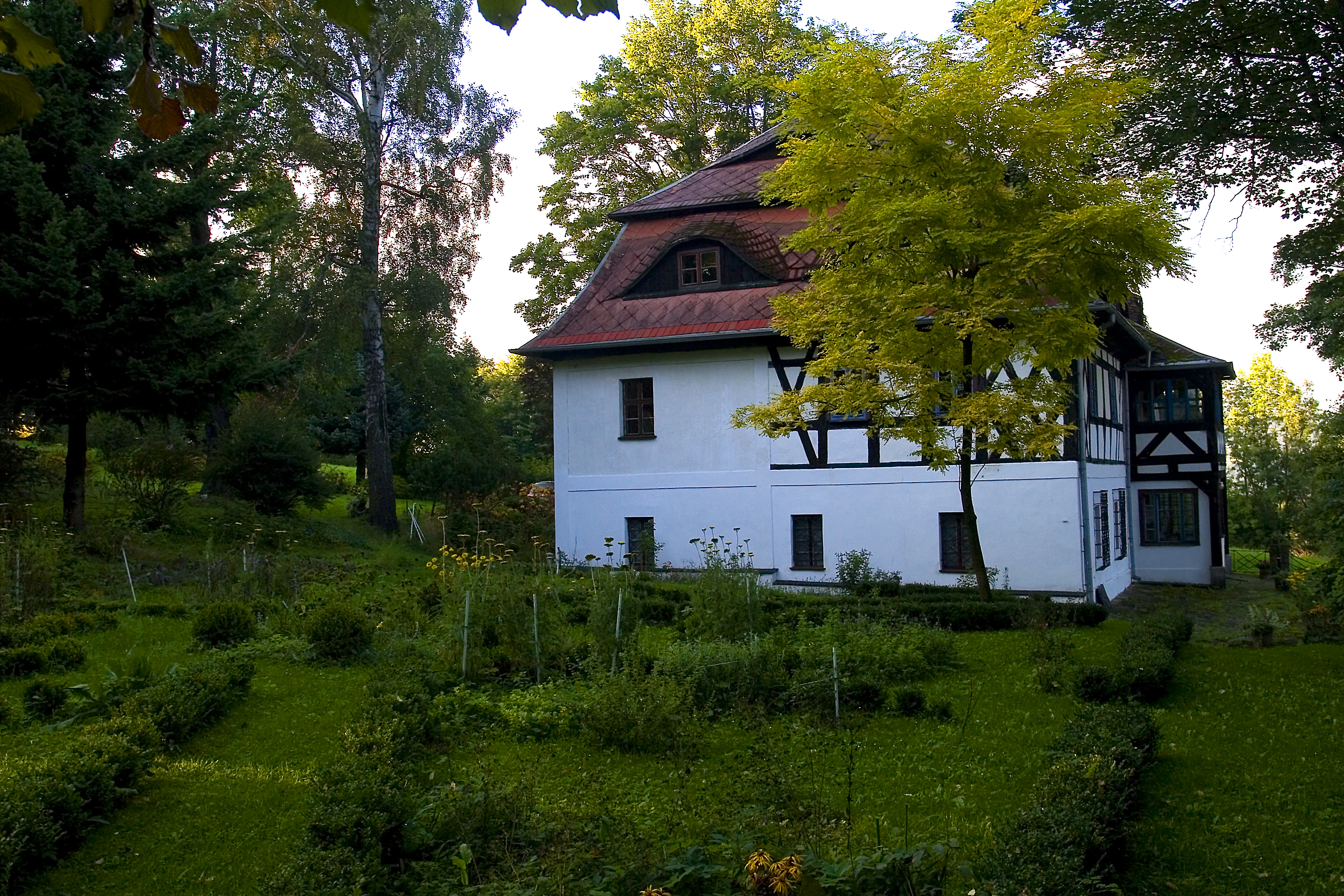
- Manor

- Location within Poland
- Coordinates: 50°52′N 15°57′E
- Country: Poland
- Voivodeship: Lower Silesian
- Powiat: Karkonosze
- Gmina: Janowice Wielkie

Mniszków [ˈmniʂkuf] is a village in the administrative district of Gmina Janowice Wielkie, within Karkonosze County, Lower Silesian Voivodeship, in south-western Poland.
