= Wieściszowice =

- Village
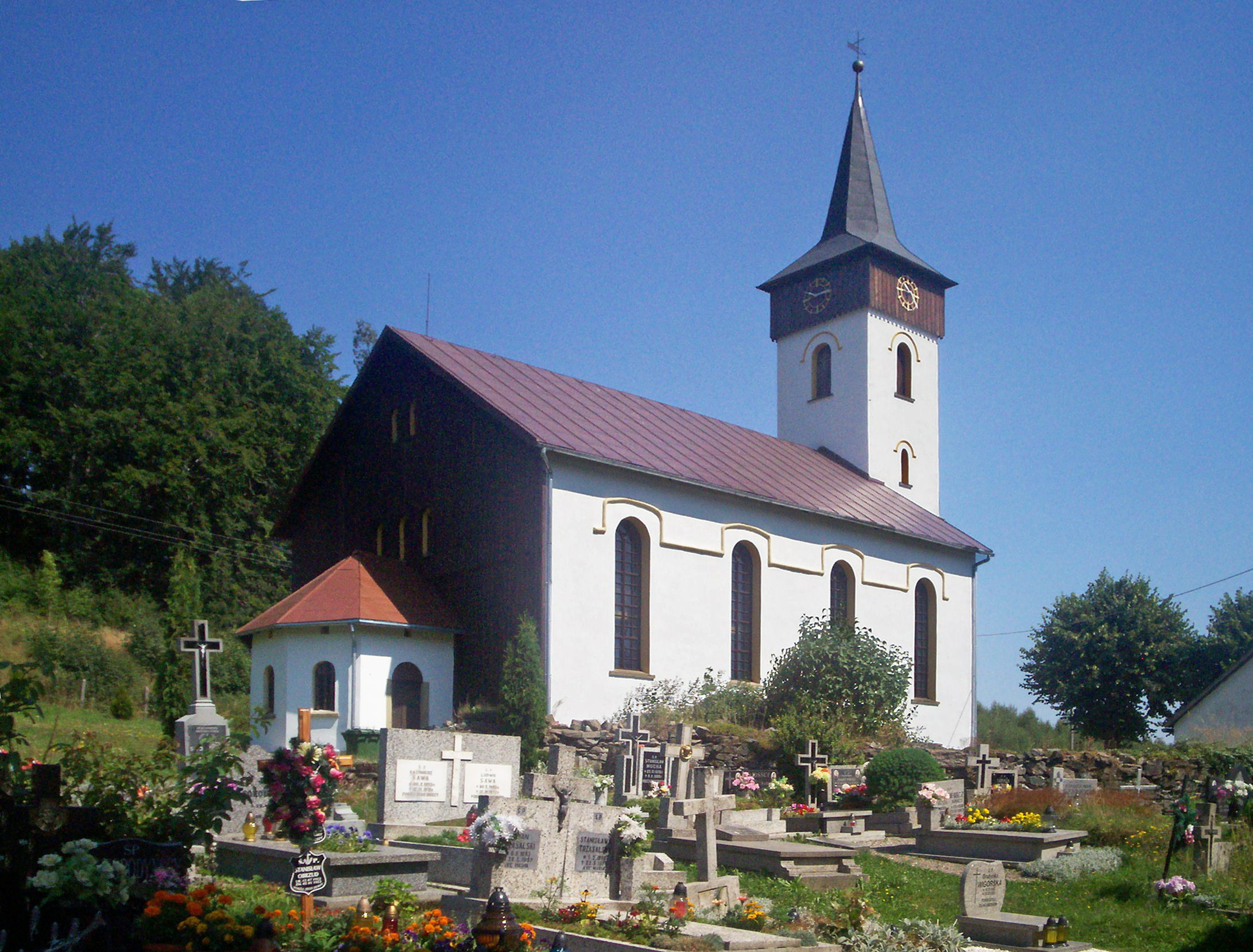

- Location within Poland
- Coordinates: 50°50′12″N 15°57′51″E
- Country: Poland
- Voivodeship: Lower Silesian
- County: Kamienna Góra
- Gmina: Marciszów

Population
  - Total: 400

Wieściszowice [vjɛɕt͡ɕiʂɔˈvit͡sɛ] is a village in the administrative district of Gmina Marciszów, within Kamienna Góra County, Lower Silesian Voivodeship, in south-western Poland.
