= Marciszów railway station =

Railway station in Marciszów, Poland

Marciszów
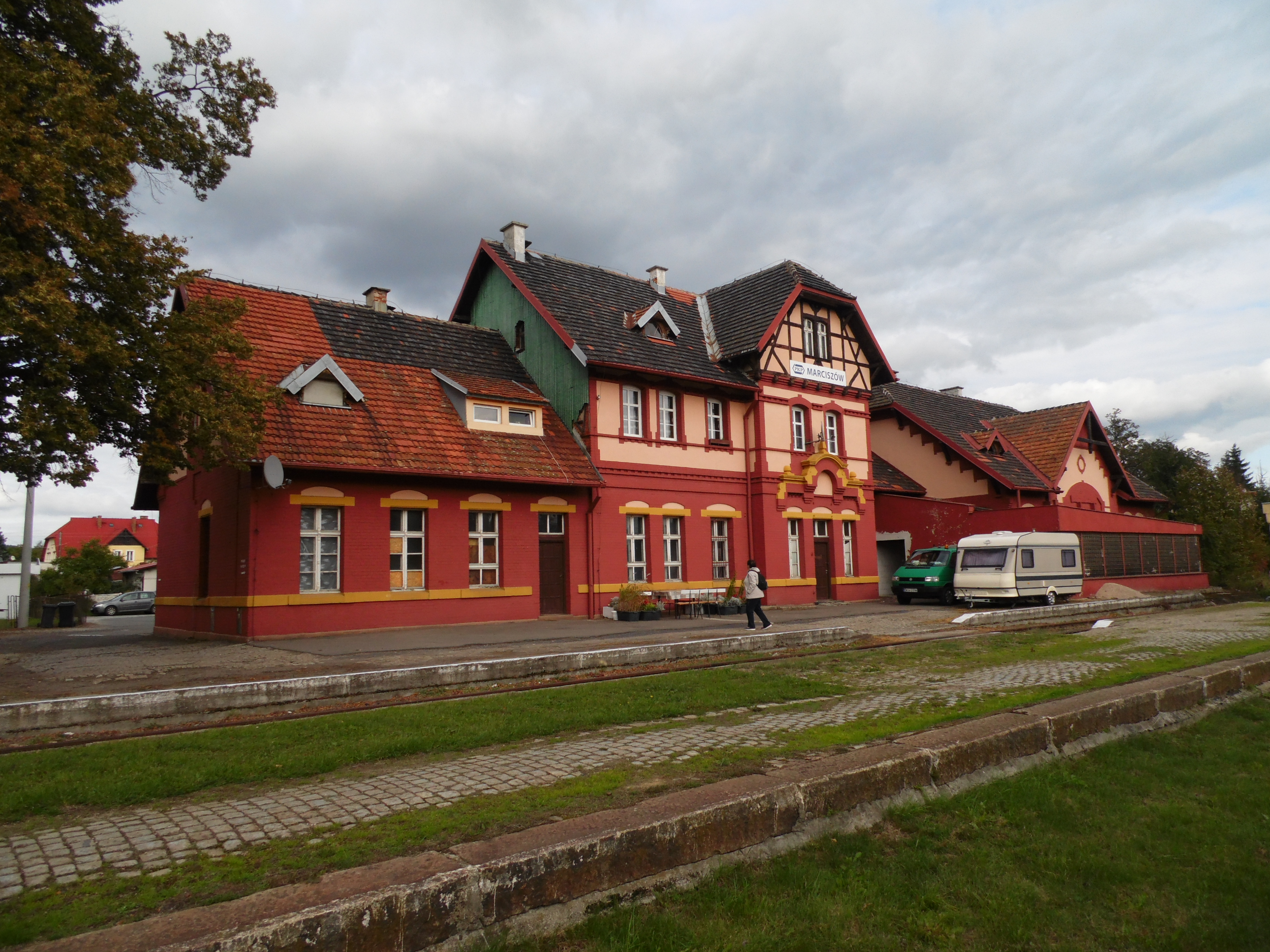
- Station building

General information
- Location: Marciszów, Lower Silesian Voivodeship; Poland
- Coordinates: 50°51′04.1″N 16°00′28.0″E
- Owner: Polish State Railways
- Lines: Wrocław Świebodzki–Zgorzelec railway; Malczyce–Marciszów railway (under construction); Marciszów–Jerzmanice-Zdrój railway (closed)
- Platforms: 5

History
- Opened: 15 August 1867
- Former names: Merzdorf (1867–1945); Merzdorf (Riesengebirge) (1914–1945)

Services
Preceding station	KD	Following station
Sędzisław towards Wrocław Główny	D6	Ciechanowice towards Jelenia Góra
Sędzisław towards Wrocław Główny	D60	Ciechanowice towards Szklarska Poręba Górna
Location
- Location within Poland Location within Lower Silesian Voivodeship

Marciszów (German: Merzdorf) is a railway station in the village of Marciszów, Kamienna Góra County, within the Lower Silesian Voivodeship in south-western Poland.

== History ==
The station was opened by Prussian State Railways as Merzdorf on 15 August 1867, originally part of the historical Silesian Mountain Railway. The station was built adjacent to a housing estate for railway workers. In 1914, the station was renamed to Merzdorf (Riesengebirge).

After World War II, the area came under Polish administration. As a result, the station was taken over by Polish State Railways and was renamed to Marciszów. In 1953, the Marciszów traction station was transformed into an auxiliary locomotive shed to the locomotive shed in Jelenia Góra. Several sidings once branched off the station to brickyards and sawmills, all sidings are now fully dismantled.

In 2022, the Malczyce–Marciszów railway was taken over by the Lower Silesian Voivodeship in preparation for the reconstruction and reopening of the line, which previously closed in the between 1989–1992. The reconstruction of the line began in February 2026, first on the section between Marciszów and Strzegom. Phase 1 of the project includes the reconstruction of the 5 km (3.1 mi) section between Grabina Śląska and Roztoka, which will cost around 14 million Polish złoty, set to be completed by 31 May 2026.

== Train services ==
The station is served by the following services:

- Regional services (KD) Wrocław - Wałbrzych - Jelenia Góra
- Regional services (KD) Wrocław - Wałbrzych - Jelenia Góra - Szklarska Poręba Górna
