= Gmina Marciszów =

Gmina Marciszów Marciszów Commune
- Gmina
- Flag Coat of arms
- Interactive map of Gmina Marciszów
- Coordinates (Marciszów): 50°50′33″N 16°1′57″E
- Country: Poland
- Voivodeship: Lower Silesian
- County: Kamienna Góra
- Seat: Marciszów
- Sołectwos: Ciechanowice, Domanów, Marciszów, Nagórnik, Pastewnik, Pustelnik, Sędzisław, Świdnik, Wieściszowice

Area
  - Total: 81.98 km^{2} (31.65 sq mi)

Population (2019-06-30)
  - Total: 4,499
  - Density: 54.88/km^{2} (142.1/sq mi)
- Website: http://www.marciszow.pl

Gmina Marciszów is a rural gmina (administrative district) in Kamienna Góra County, Lower Silesian Voivodeship, in south-western Poland. Its seat is the village of Marciszów, which lies approximately 4 kilometres (2 mi) north-west of Kamienna Góra and 78 km (48 mi) south-west of the regional capital Wrocław.

The gmina covers an area of 81.98 square kilometres (31.7 sq mi), and as of 2019 its total population is 4,499.

== Neighbouring gminas ==
Gmina Marciszów is bordered by the gminas of Bolków, Czarny Bór, Janowice Wielkie, Kamienna Góra and Stare Bogaczowice.

== Villages ==
The gmina contains the villages of Ciechanowice, Domanów, Marciszów, Nagórnik, Pastewnik, Pustelnik, Sędzisław, Świdnik and Wieściszowice.
