= Marciszów =

- Village
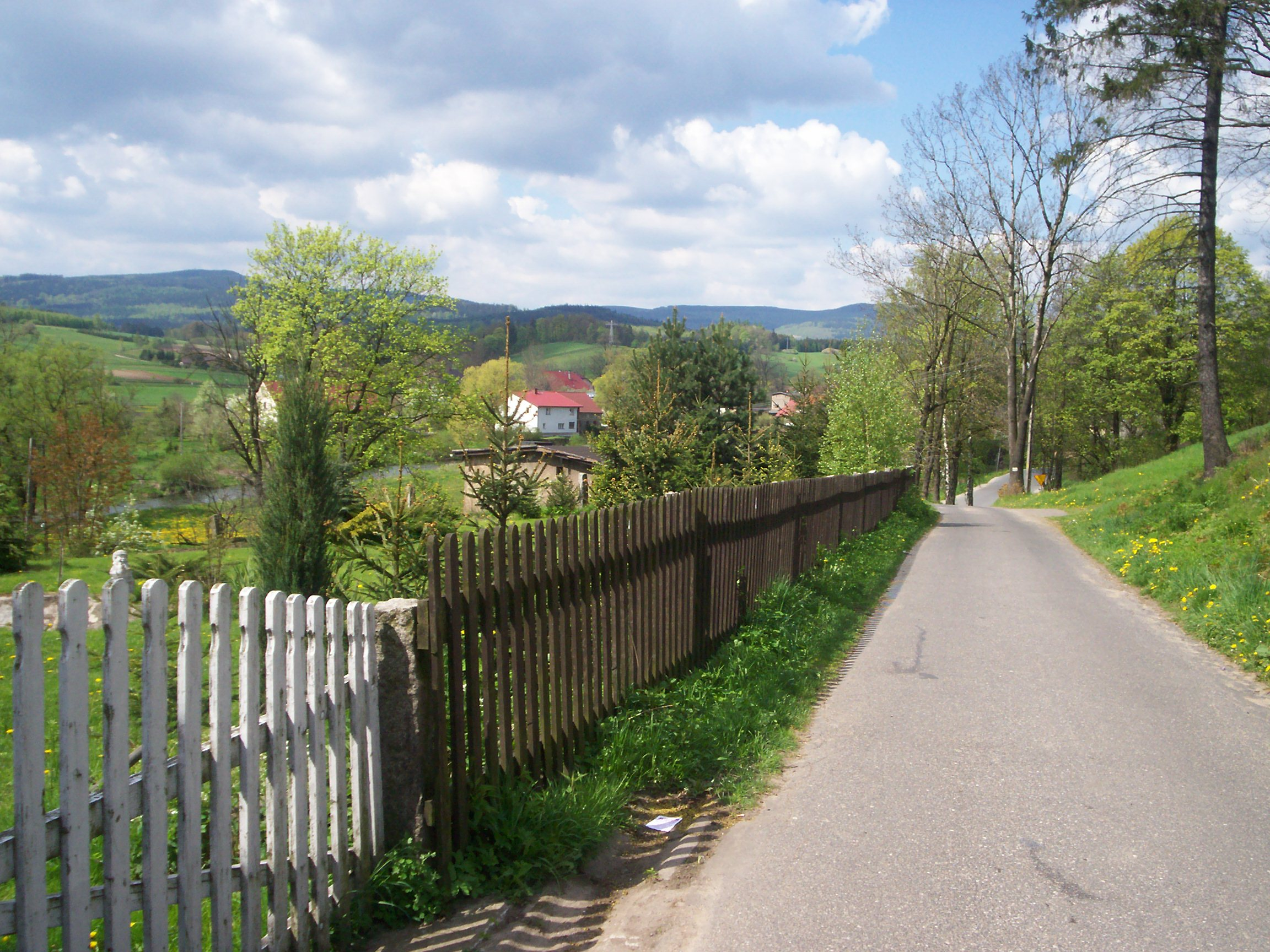

- Flag Coat of arms

- Location within Poland
- Coordinates: 50°50′33″N 16°1′57″E
- Country: Poland
- Voivodeship: Lower Silesian
- County: Kamienna Góra
- Gmina: Marciszów
- Time zone: UTC+1 (CET)
  - Summer (DST): UTC+2 (CEST)
- Vehicle registration: DKA

Marciszów [marˈt͡ɕiʂuf] is a village in Kamienna Góra County, Lower Silesian Voivodeship, in south-western Poland. It is the seat of the administrative district (gmina) called Gmina Marciszów. It is situated in the Marciszów Valley in the Sudetes.

== History ==
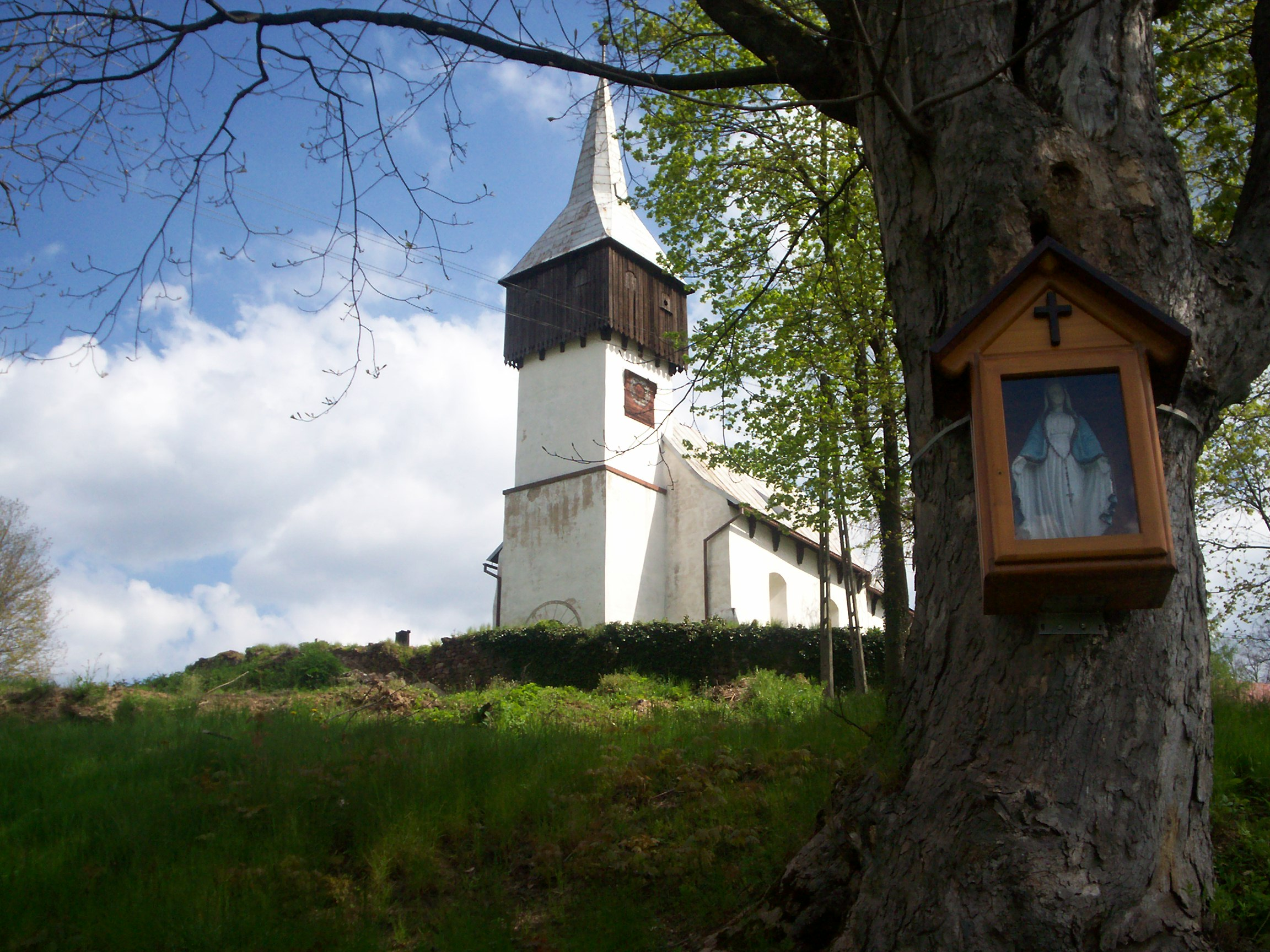
Saint Catherine church

The area became part of the emerging Polish state under the Piast dynasty in the 10th century. Following the fragmentation of Poland into smaller duchies, it formed part of the duchies of Silesia and Świdnica. In 1368, along with the latter it became a fief of the Bohemian Crown, which formed part of the Holy Roman Empire.

In 1526, when the Habsburg dynasty succeeded as kings of Bohemia, Marciszów as Merzdorf became ruled in personal union with Austria. In 1742, with the First Silesian War the village passed to Prussia, and from 1871 it formed part of Germany.

During World War II, from 1944 to 1945 under Nazi rule in Germany, in the textile factory Kramsta-Methner, Jewish women from various countries, then held captive in the concentration camps (Terezin, Auschwitz, Gross-Rosen etc.) were used for forced labour.

After Germany's defeat in the war, the village became again part of Poland. An agricultural cooperative operated in Marciszów from 1950 to 1957.

== Transport ==
There is a railway station in Marciszów.
