= Pustelnik, Lower Silesian Voivodeship =

Polish village

Pustelnik
- Village
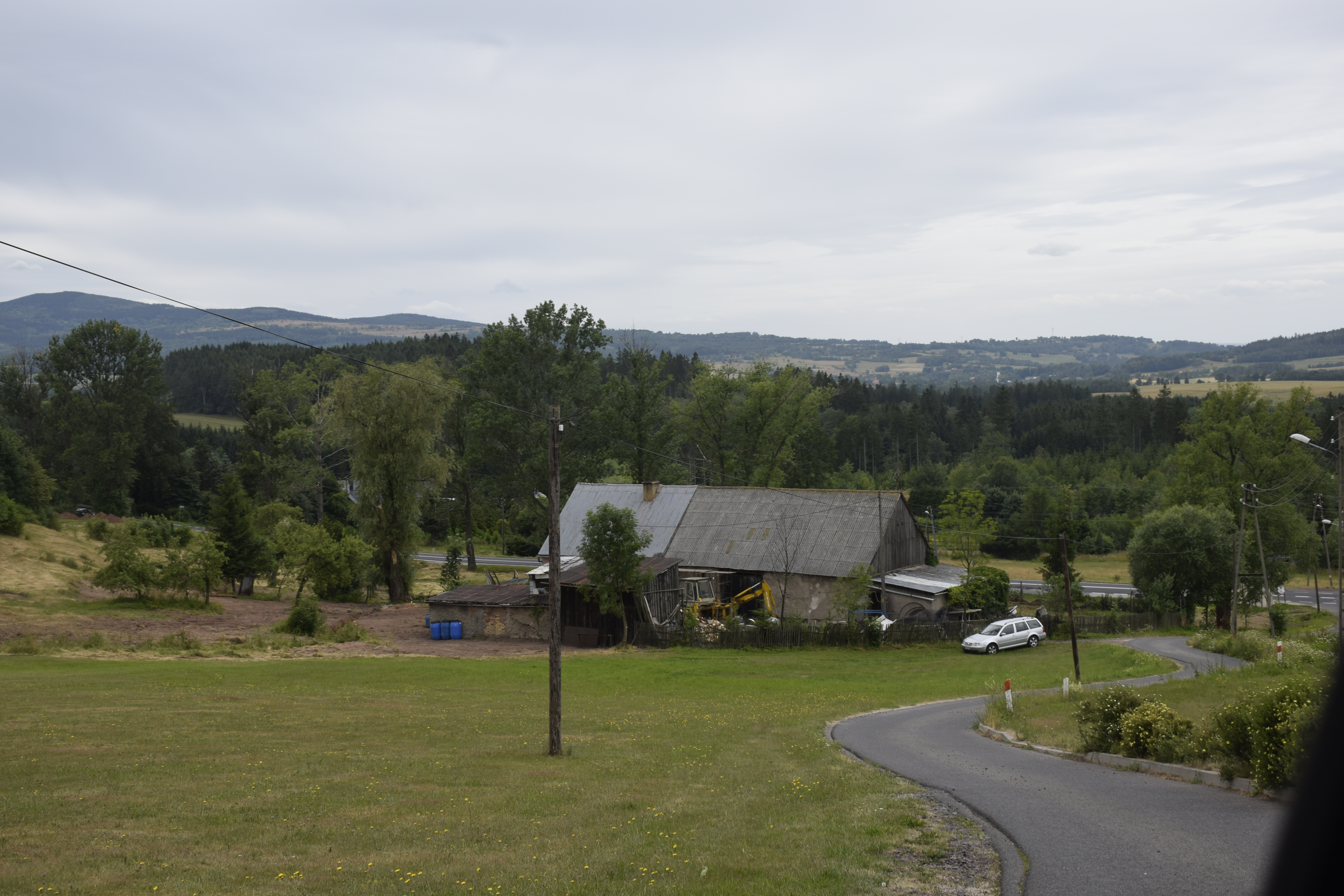
- House in the village

- Location within Poland
- Coordinates: 50°51′6″N 16°3′12″E
- Country: Poland
- Voivodeship: Lower Silesian
- County: Kamienna Góra
- Gmina: Marciszów

Pustelnik (Polish pronunciation: [pusˈtɛlɲik]) is a village in the administrative district of Gmina Marciszów, within Kamienna Góra County, Lower Silesian Voivodeship, in south-western Poland.

== Gallery ==
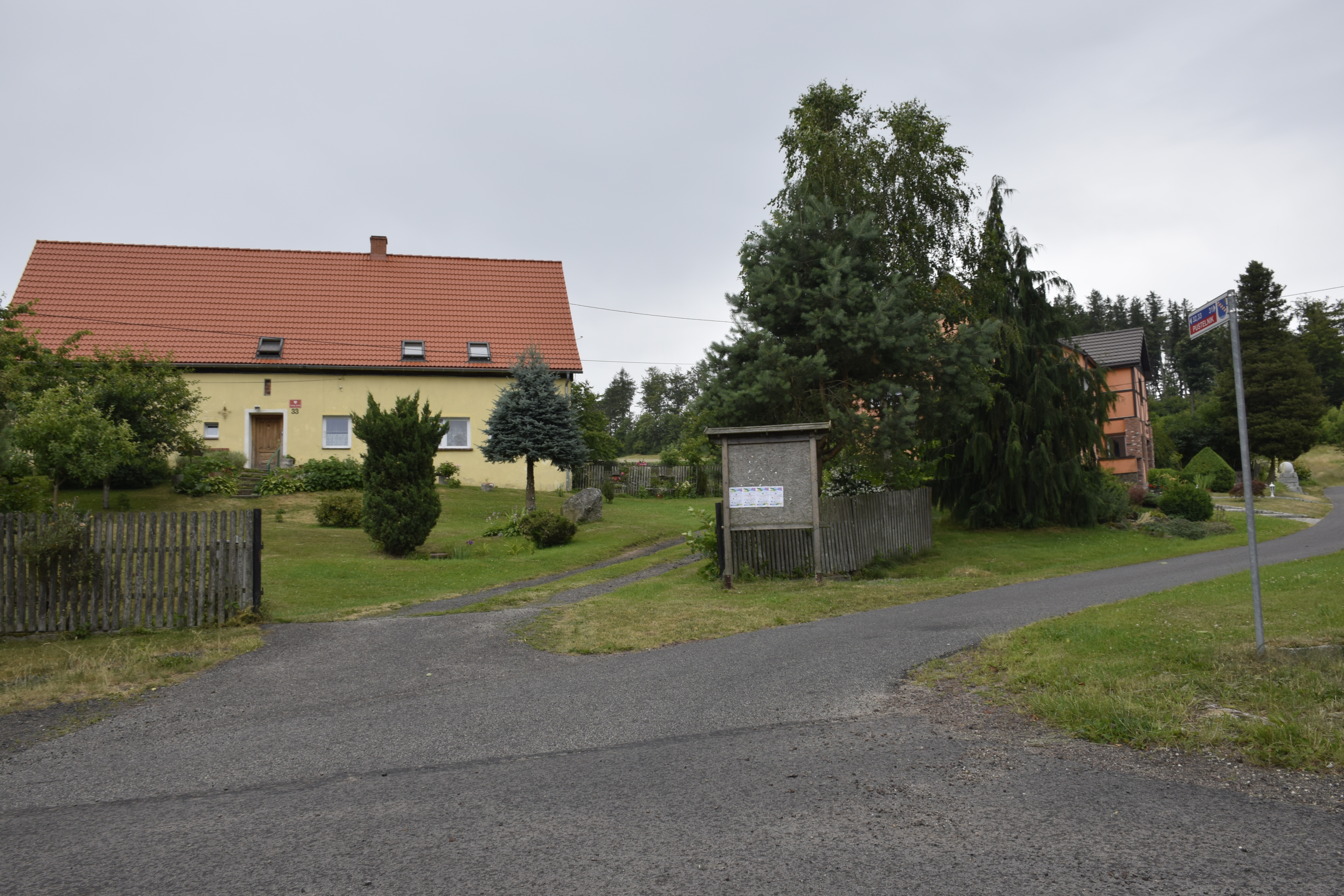

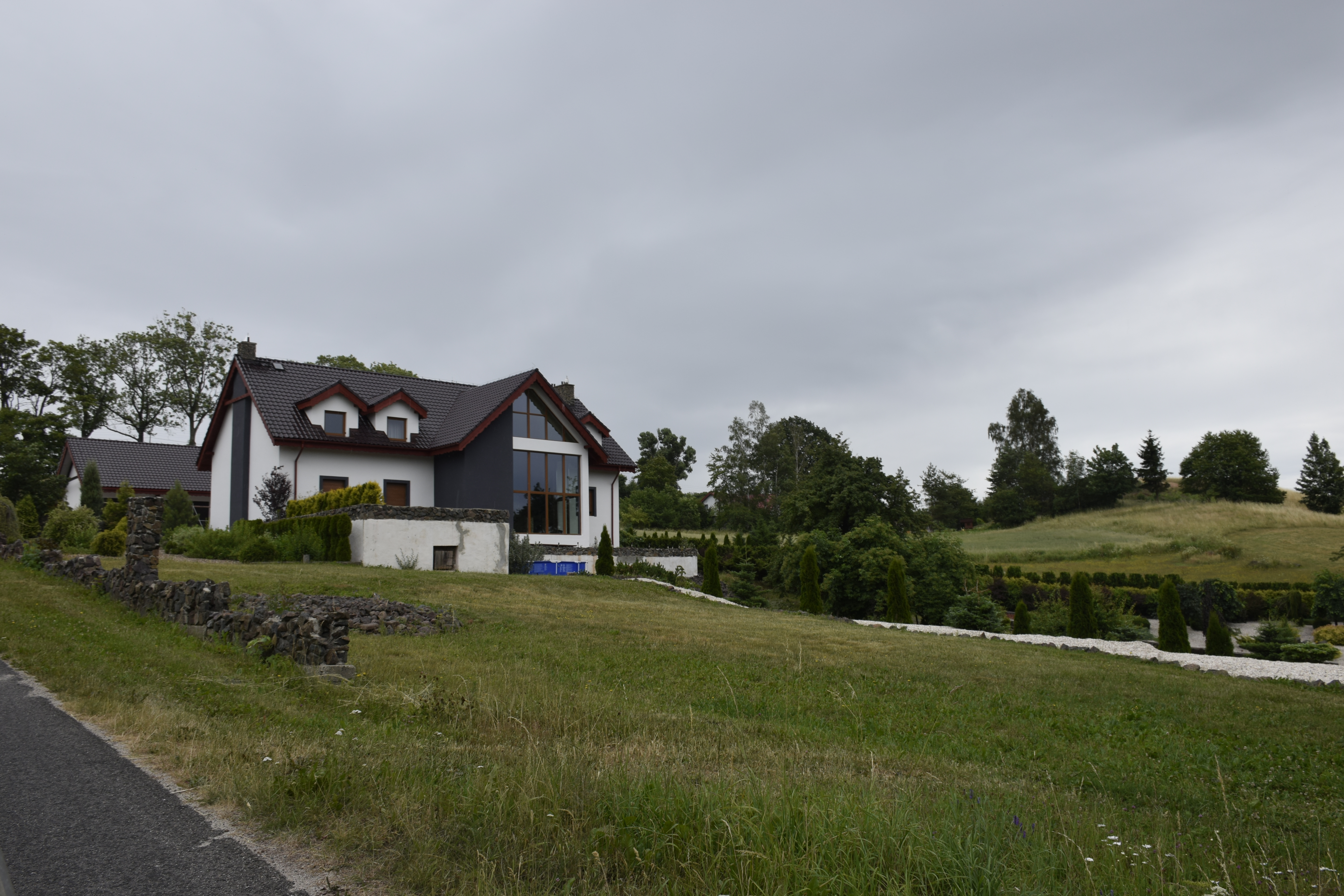

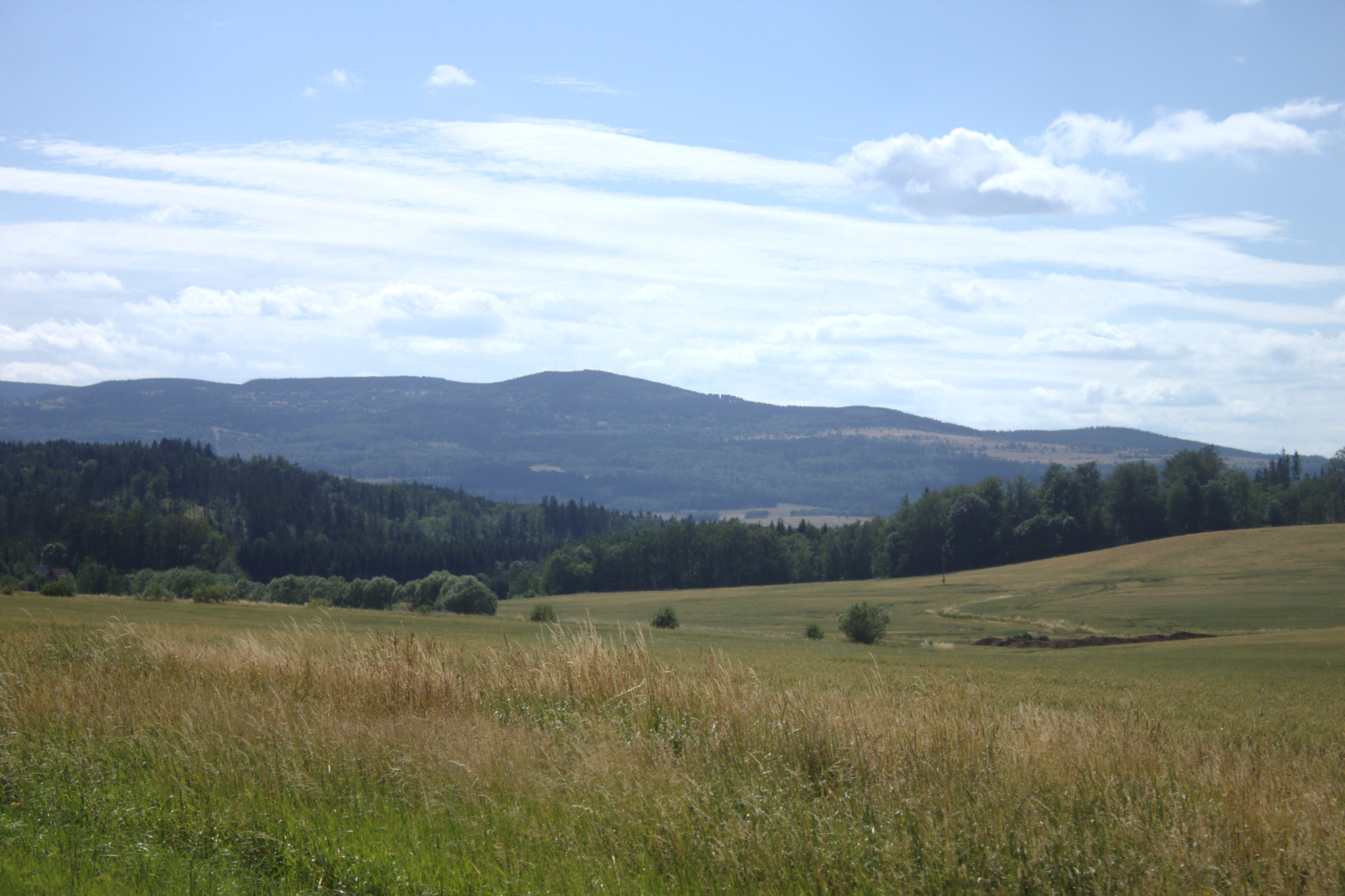
