= Ciechanowice railway station =

Railway station in Ciechanowice, Poland

Ciechanowice
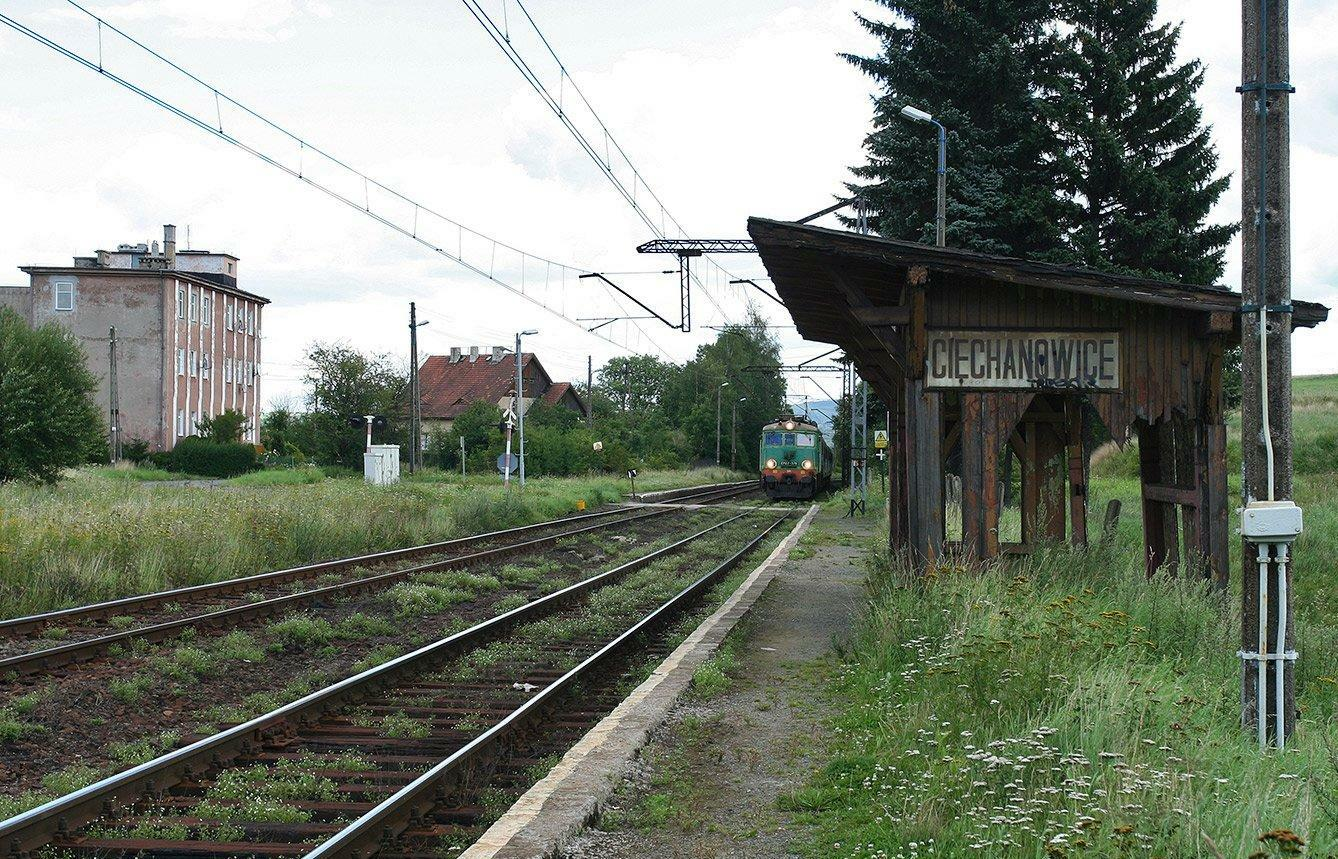
- Platforms in 2007, prior to the station's reconstruction

General information
- Location: Ciechanowice, Lower Silesian Voivodeship; Poland
- Coordinates: 50°51′55.1″N 15°58′47.0″E
- Owner: Polish State Railways
- Line: Wrocław Świebodzki–Zgorzelec railway
- Platforms: 2

History
- Opened: 15 July 1906
- Electrified: 1919–1920
- Former names: Rudelstadt (1906–1945); Rudzielec (1945–1947)

Services
Preceding station	KD	Following station
Marciszów towards Wrocław Główny	D6	Janowice Wielkie towards Jelenia Góra
Marciszów towards Wrocław Główny	D60	Janowice Wielkie towards Szklarska Poręba Górna
Location
- Location within Poland Location within Lower Silesian Voivodeship

Ciechanowice (German: Rudelstadt) is a railway station in the village of Ciechanowice, Kamienna Góra County, within the Lower Silesian Voivodeship in south-western Poland.

== History ==
The station was opened by Prussian State Railways as Rudelstadt on 15 July 1906. On 1 November 1910, a freight loading bay opened making the station a freight station. At the time, it was classed IV, loading bays could be accessed via sidings which branched off the station. Electrification of the line at the section of Ciechanowice was completed by Siemens between 1919–1920.

After World War II, the area came under Polish administration. As a result, the station was taken over by Polish State Railways and was renamed to Rudzielec, and later to its modern name, Ciechanowice, in 1947.

The station building closed in 1998, and was left abandoned until its demolition in 2007. The station was rebuilt and modernised with new high-level platforms in mid-2016.

== Train services ==
The station is served by the following services:

- Regional services (KD) Wrocław - Wałbrzych - Jelenia Góra
- Regional services (KD) Wrocław - Wałbrzych - Jelenia Góra - Szklarska Poręba Górna
- Regional services (PR) Szklarska Poręba Górna - Jelenia Góra - Wrocław Główny - Poznań Główny
