= Wojanów railway station =

Railway station in Wojanów, Poland

Wojanów
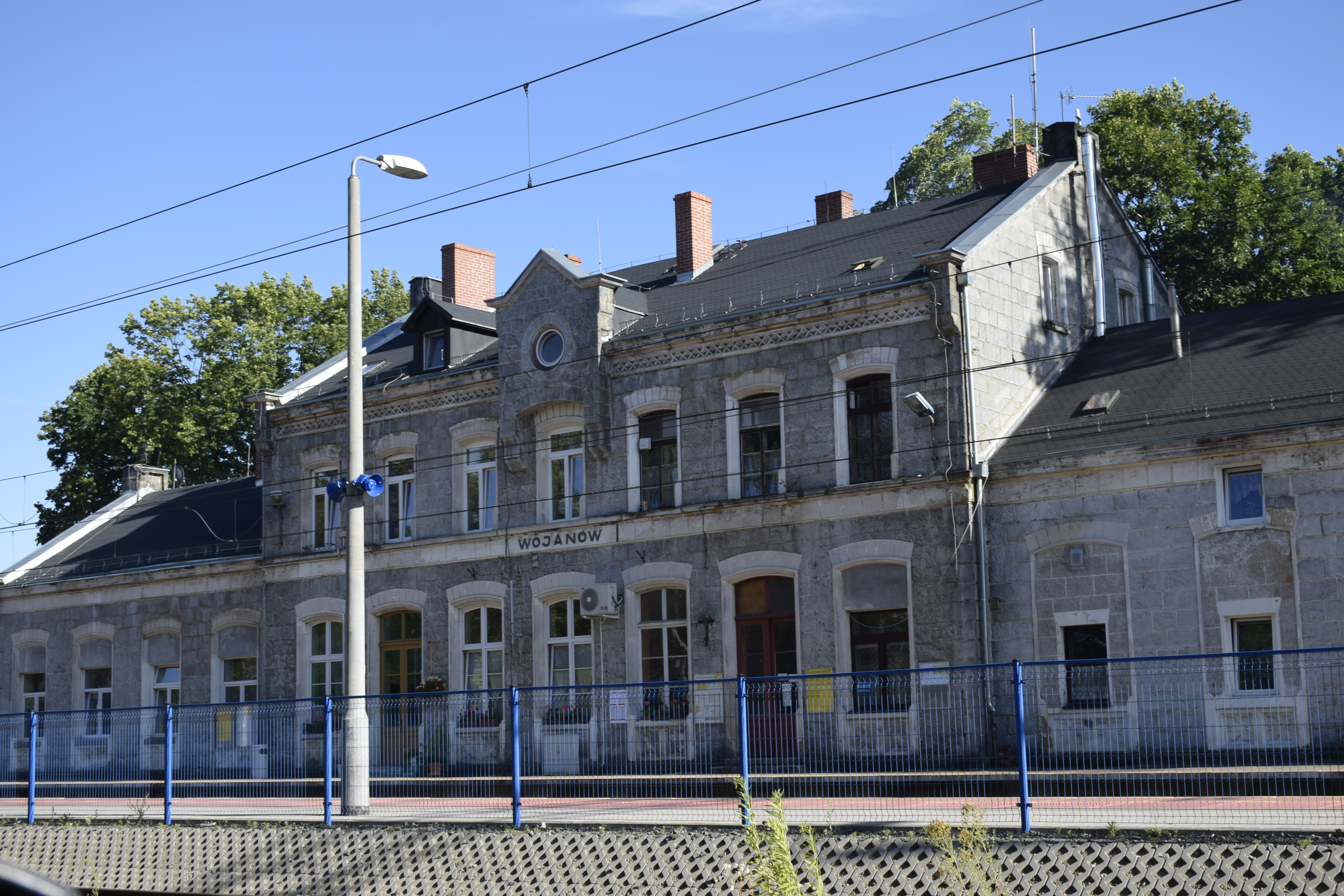
- Station building

General information
- Location: Wojanów, Lower Silesian Voivodeship; Poland
- Coordinates: 50°53′04.9″N 15°49′17.5″E
- Owner: Polish State Railways
- Line: Wrocław Świebodzki–Zgorzelec railway
- Platforms: 2

History
- Opened: 15 August 1867
- Former names: Schildau (Schmideberg) (1867–1901); Schildau (1901–1926); Schildau (Bober) (1926–1945); Szydłów nad Bobrem (1945–1947)

Services
Preceding station	KD	Following station
Trzcińsko towards Wrocław Główny	D6	Jelenia Góra Terminus
Trzcińsko towards Wrocław Główny	D60	Jelenia Góra towards Szklarska Poręba Górna
Location
- Location within Poland Location within Lower Silesian Voivodeship

Wojanów (German: Schildau) is a railway station in the village of Wojanów, Karkonosze County, within the Lower Silesian Voivodeship in south-western Poland.

== History ==
The station was opened by Prussian State Railways as Schildau (Schmideberg) on 15 August 1867, originally part of the historic Silesian Mountain Railway. At the time, the station was the main starting point for trips to the Giant Mountains. The station was renamed to Schildau in 1901, and then Schildau (Bober) in 1926.

After World War II, the area came under Polish administration. As a result, the station was taken over by Polish State Railways and was renamed to Szydłów nad Bobrem, which was later renamed to its modern name, Wojanów, in 1947.

The siding to Dąbrowica paper mill, west of the station was dismantled in 2002. The only other siding which remains spurs south-east of the station to a fuel depot. In 2015, the station was modernised which included the reconstruction of platforms, (with the introduction of new facilities, like passenger information screens) modernisation of level crossings, renovations of surrounding bridges and viaducts, and track revitalisation. This was part of a 60 million Polish złoty modernisation programme of the route between Wrocław–Jelenia Góra.

== Accidents and incidents ==
- On 15 September 1976, Express train no. 6110 "Karkonosze" from Jelenia Góra bound for Warszawa Wschodnia collided with a Syrena car at a guarded level crossing, where the barriers had been incorrectly raised, due to human error. All four occupants of the car died at the scene.

== Train services ==
The station is served by the following services:

- Regional services (KD) Wrocław - Wałbrzych - Jelenia Góra
- Regional services (KD) Wrocław - Wałbrzych - Jelenia Góra - Szklarska Poręba Górna
- Regional services (PR) Szklarska Poręba Górna - Jelenia Góra - Wrocław Główny - Poznań Główny
