= Nagórnik, Lower Silesian Voivodeship =

Nagórnik
- Village
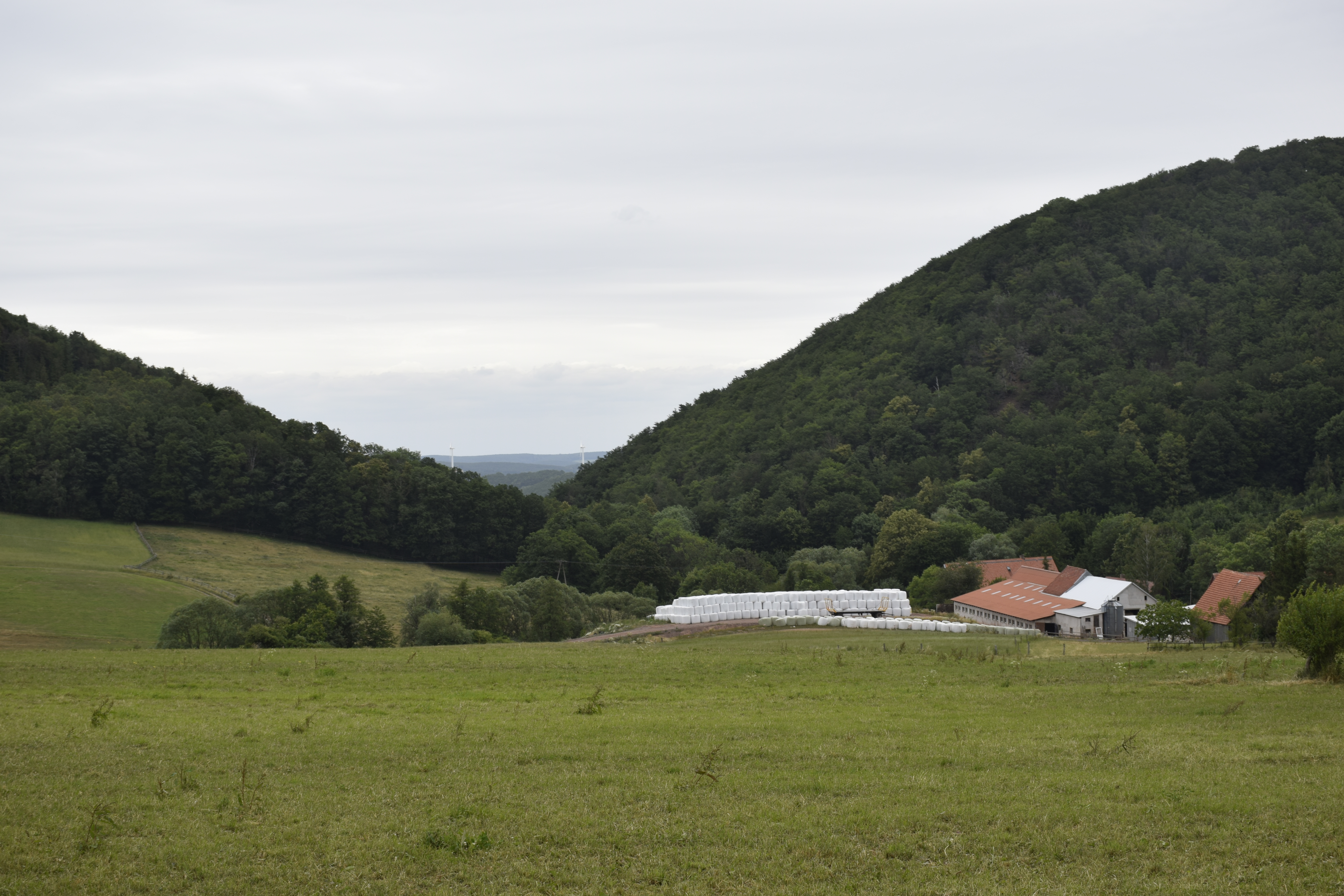
- From the distance

- Location within Poland
- Coordinates: 50°52′3″N 16°6′3″E
- Country: Poland
- Voivodeship: Lower Silesian
- County: Kamienna Góra
- Gmina: Marciszów

Nagórnik [naˈɡurnik] is a village in the administrative district of Gmina Marciszów, within Kamienna Góra County, Lower Silesian Voivodeship, in south-western Poland.

== Gallery ==
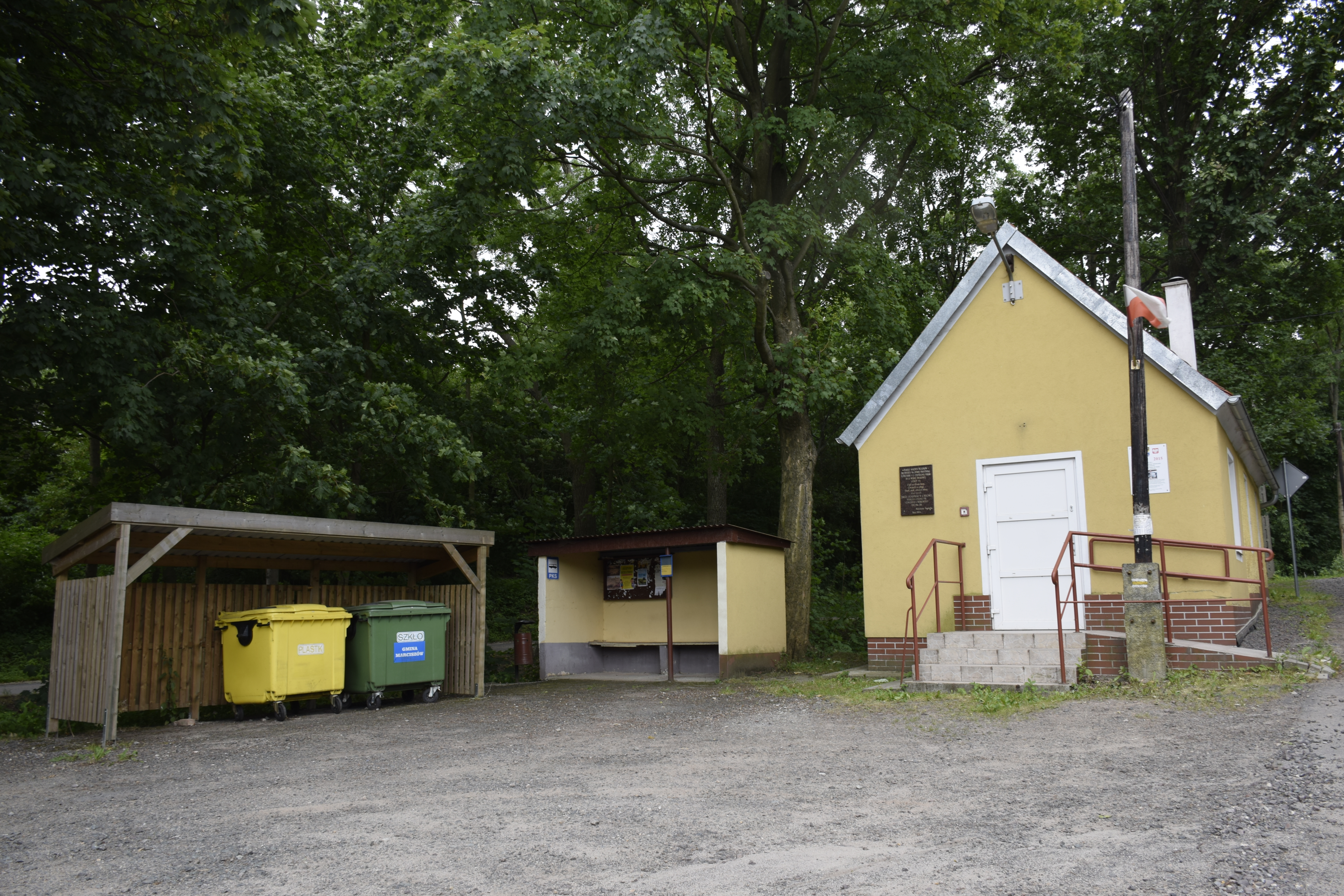
Bus stop

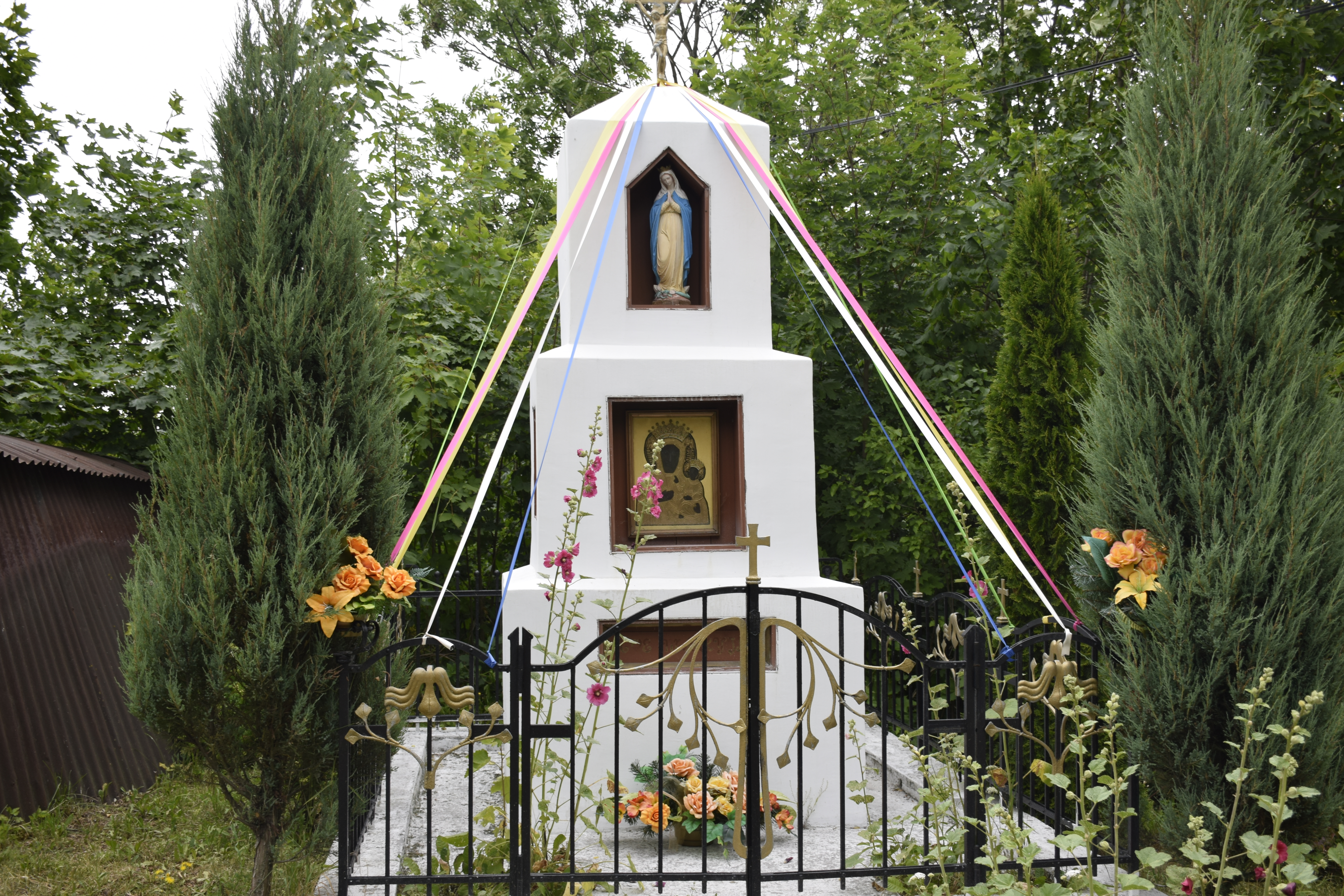
Wayside shrine

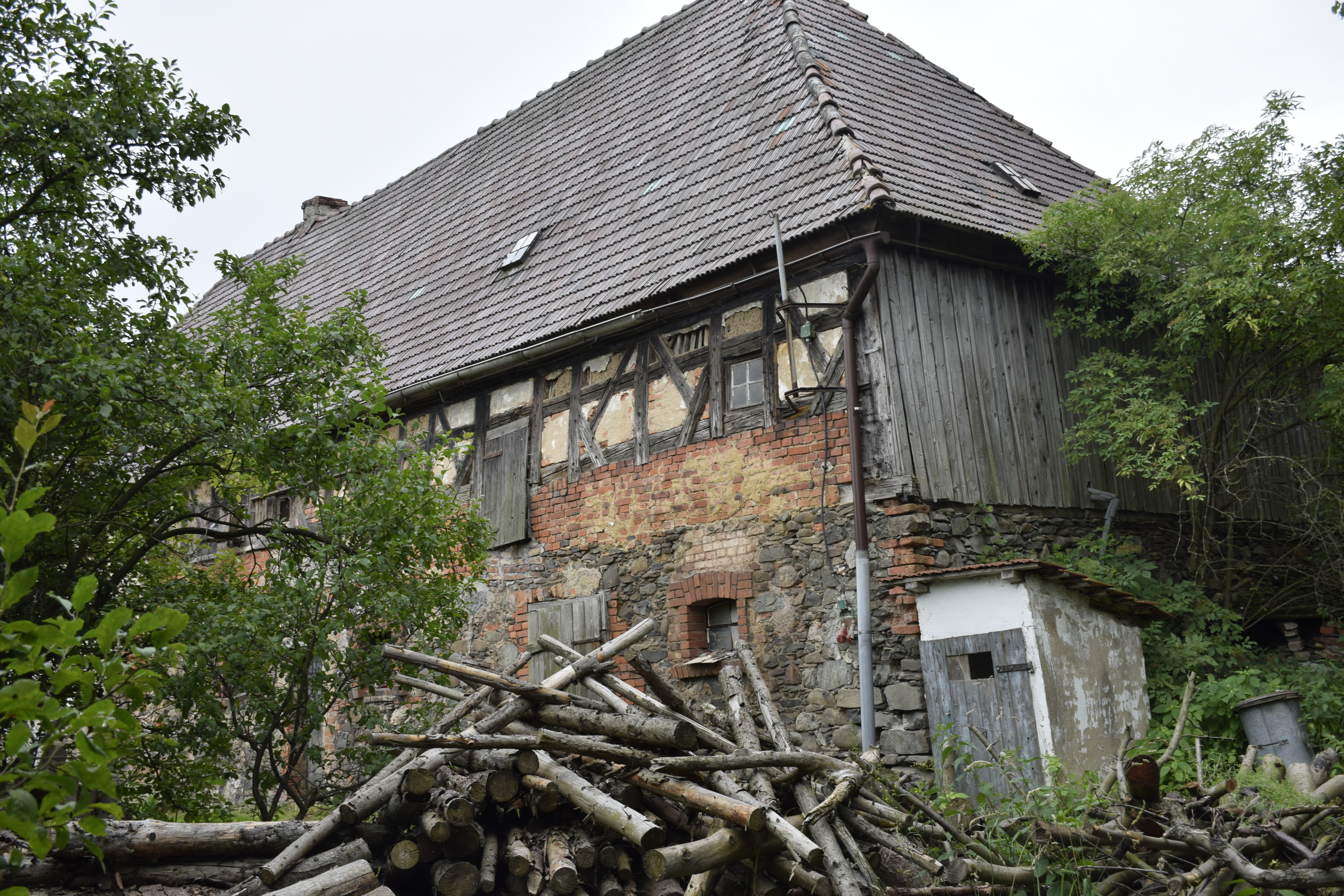
Old house
