= Świdnik, Lower Silesian Voivodeship =

Świdnik
- Village
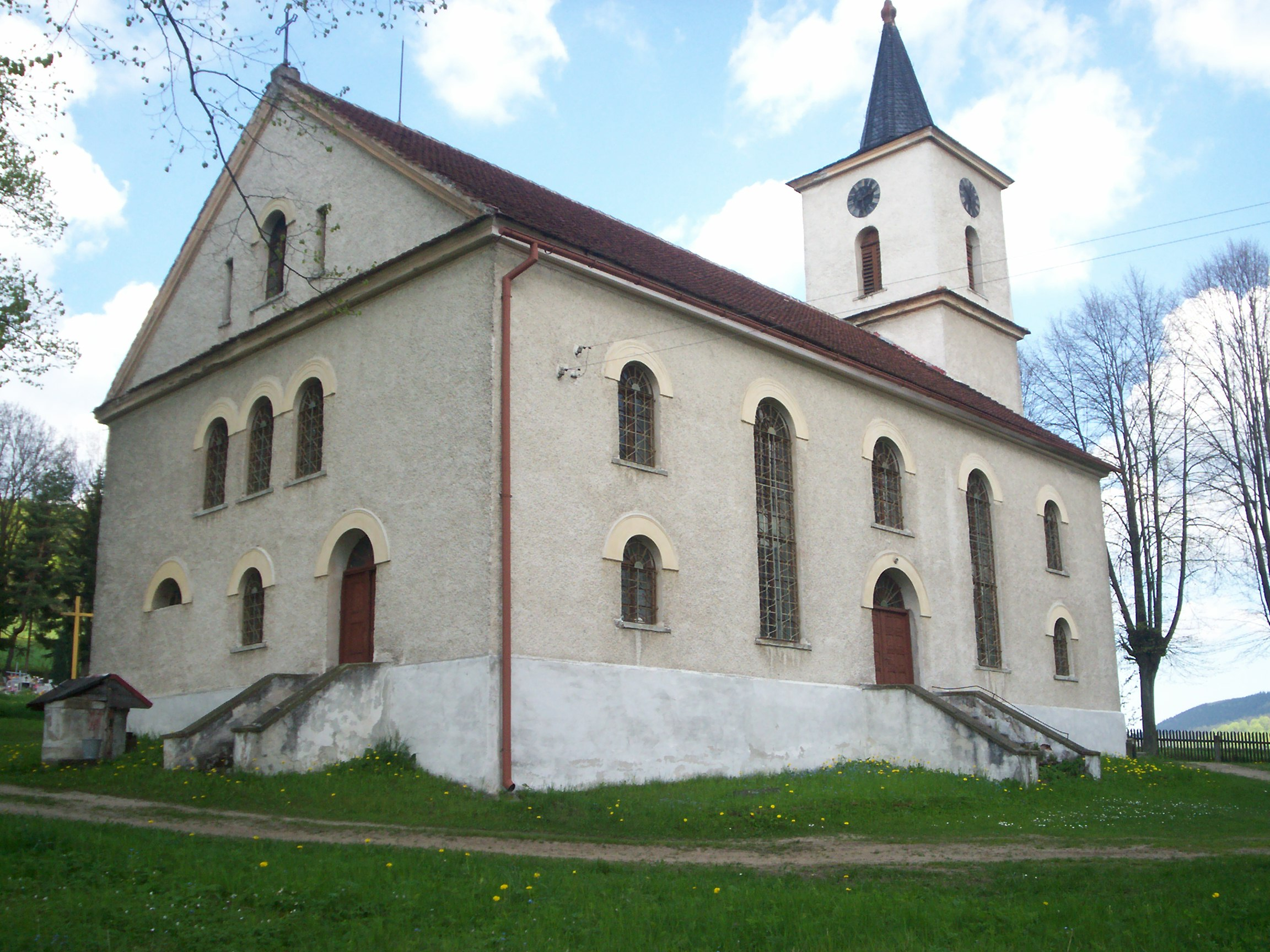

- Location within Poland
- Coordinates: 50°53′20″N 15°59′59″E
- Country: Poland
- Voivodeship: Lower Silesian
- County: Kamienna Góra
- Gmina: Marciszów

Świdnik (Polish: [ˈɕfidɲik]) is a village in the administrative district of Gmina Marciszów, within Kamienna Góra County, Lower Silesian Voivodeship, in south-western Poland. The village has a total area of .103 km^{2} (0.040 sq mi).

== Notable residents ==
- Winfried Baumgart (born 1938), German historian
