= Ciechanowice =

- Village
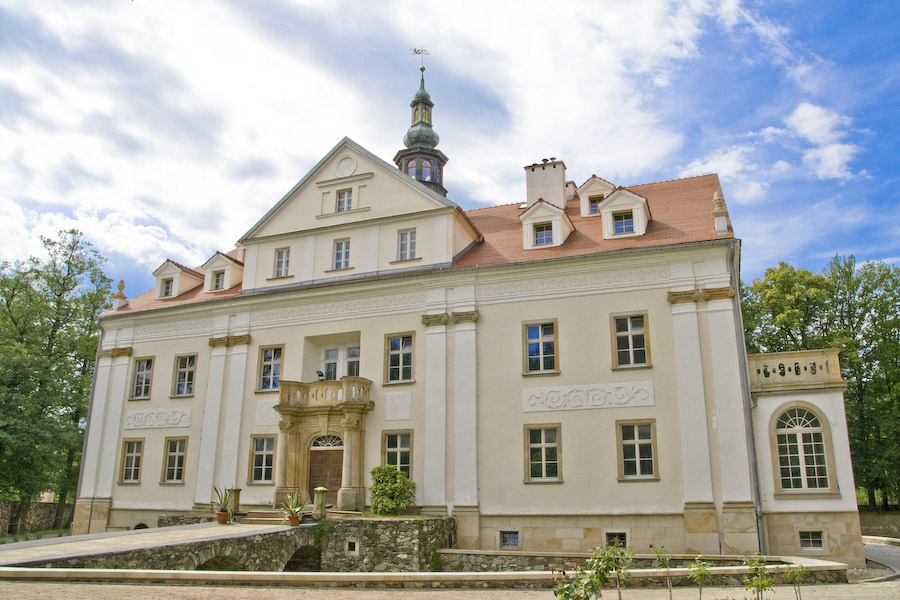
- Ciechanowice Palace

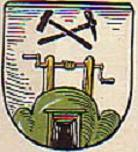
- Coat of arms

- Location within Poland
- Coordinates: 50°53′28″N 15°59′18″E
- Country: Poland
- Voivodeship: Lower Silesian
- County: Kamienna Góra
- Gmina: Marciszów

Population
  - Total: 1,100
- Time zone: UTC+1 (CET)
  - Summer (DST): UTC+2 (CEST)
- Vehicle registration: DKA

Ciechanowice [t͡ɕɛxanɔˈvit͡sɛ] is a village in the administrative district of Gmina Marciszów, within Kamienna Góra County, Lower Silesian Voivodeship, in south-western Poland. It is situated on the Bóbr River.

== History ==
Town rights were granted in 1754 and revoked in 1809. It was a center for copper and sulfur mining. In 1842, the settlement had a population of 1,182.

After assumption of Polish rule in accordance with the Potsdam Agreement, the local populace was expelled by mid-1946, for new Polish settlers to take their place.

== Transport ==
The village is served by Ciechanowice railway station.
