= Trzcińsko railway station =

Railway station in Trzcińsko, Poland

Trzcińsko
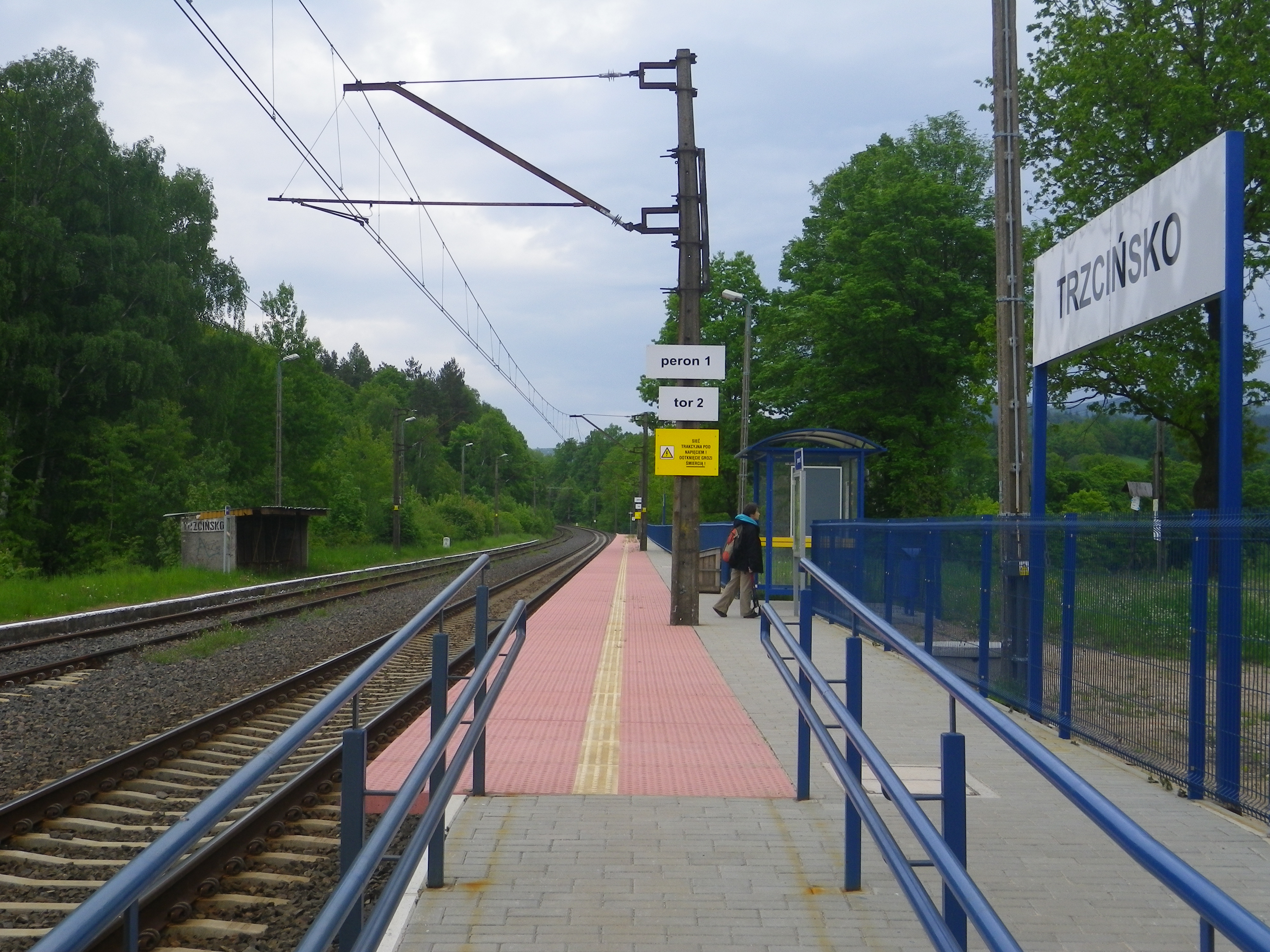
- Platforms in 2013, the platform on the left shown prior to its reconstruction

General information
- Location: Trzcińsko, Lower Silesian Voivodeship; Poland
- Coordinates: 50°53′00.0″N 15°52′17.0″E
- Owner: Polish State Railways
- Line: Wrocław Świebodzki–Zgorzelec railway
- Platforms: 2

History
- Opened: 1 November 1904
- Electrified: 1919
- Former names: Rohrlach (1904–1945); Trzcińsk (1945–1947)

Services
Preceding station	KD	Following station
Janowice Wielkie towards Wrocław Główny	D6	Wojanów towards Jelenia Góra
Janowice Wielkie towards Wrocław Główny	D60	Wojanów towards Szklarska Poręba Górna
Location
- Location within Poland Location within Lower Silesian Voivodeship

Trzcińsko (German: Rohrlach) is a railway station in the village of Trzcińsko, Karkonosze County, within the Lower Silesian Voivodeship in south-western Poland.

== History ==
The station was opened by Prussian State Railways as Rohrlach on 1 November 1904. The station was electrified by Siemens between 1913–1914, however the first electric trains ran in 1919.

After World War II, the area came under Polish administration. As a result, the station was taken over by Polish State Railways and was renamed to Trzcińsk, which was later renamed to its modern name, Trzcińsko, in 1947. Overhead wires were dismantled, unelectrifying the station. Trzcińsko was re-electrified between 1965–1966.

The station building, a former ticket hall, was demolished in 2007. The station was modernised (which included the reconstruction of one of the platforms) in 2012. The other platform was modernised in 2018.

== Train services ==
The station is served by the following services:

- Regional services (KD) Wrocław - Wałbrzych - Jelenia Góra
- Regional services (KD) Wrocław - Wałbrzych - Jelenia Góra - Szklarska Poręba Górna
- Regional services (PR) Szklarska Poręba Górna - Jelenia Góra - Wrocław Główny - Poznań Główny
