= Janowice Wielkie railway station =

Railway station in Janowice Wielkie, Poland

Janowice Wielkie
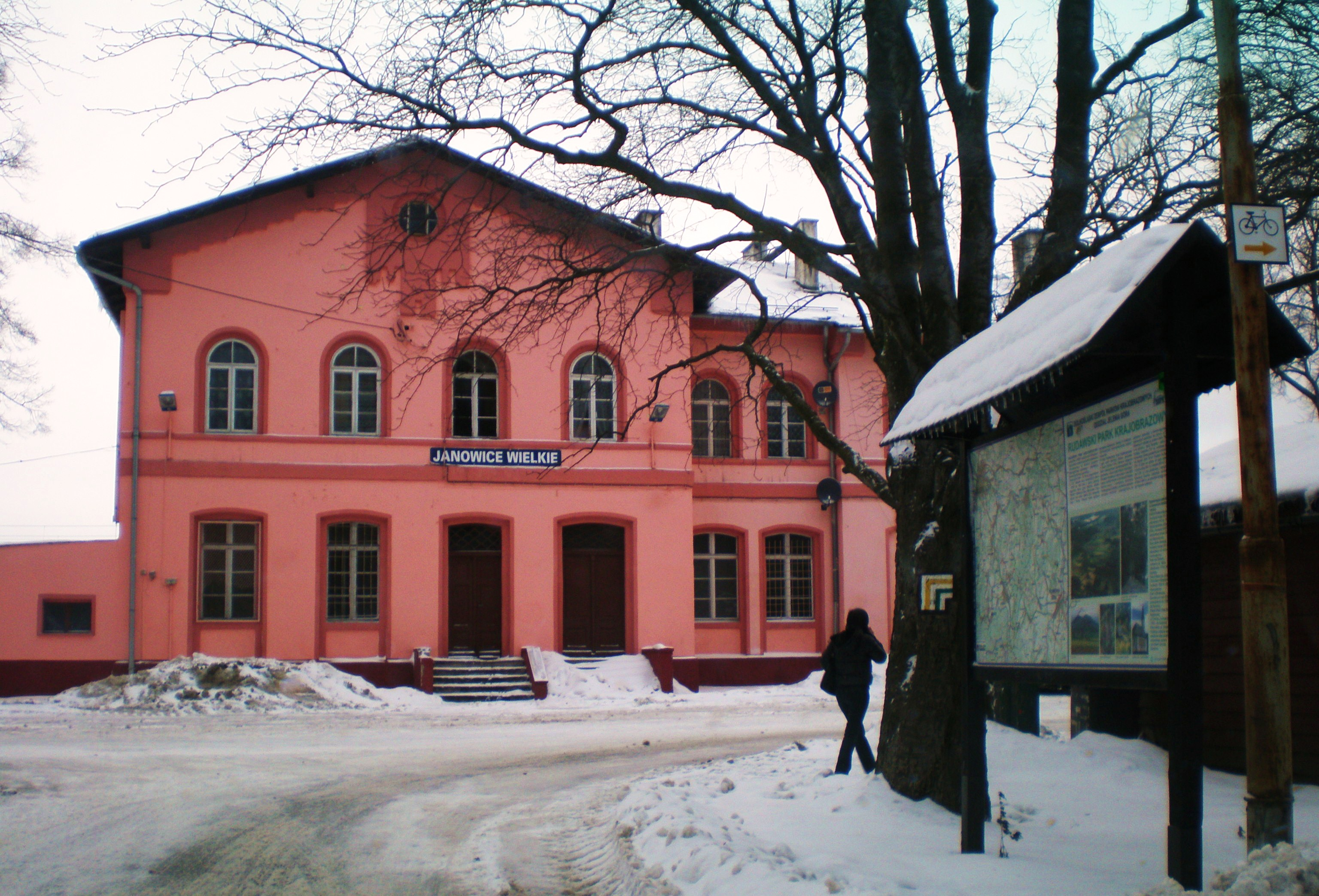
- Station building

General information
- Location: Janowice Wielkie, Lower Silesian Voivodeship; Poland
- Coordinates: 50°52′42.5″N 15°55′07.4″E
- Owner: Polish State Railways
- Line: Wrocław Świebodzki–Zgorzelec railway
- Platforms: 2
- Tracks: 4

History
- Opened: 15 August 1867
- Electrified: 1919
- Former names: Jannowitz (1867–1914); Jannowitz (Riesengebirge) (1914–1945)

Services
Preceding station	KD	Following station
Ciechanowice towards Wrocław Główny	D6	Trzcińsko towards Jelenia Góra
Ciechanowice towards Wrocław Główny	D60	Trzcińsko towards Szklarska Poręba Górna
Location
- Location within Poland Location within Lower Silesian Voivodeship

Janowice Wielkie (German: Jannowitz) is a railway station in the village of Janowice Wielkie, Karkonosze County, within the Lower Silesian Voivodeship in south-western Poland.

== History ==
The station was opened by Prussian State Railways as Jannowitz on 15 July 1867, originally part of the historic Silesian Mountain Railway. The station was renamed to Jannowitz (Riesengebirge) for designation in 1914. Janowice Wielkie was electrified by Siemens between 1913–1914, however the first electric trains ran in 1919.

After World War II, the area came under Polish administration. As a result, the station was taken over by Polish State Railways and was renamed to Janowice Wielkie. Overhead wires were dismantled, unelectrifying the station. A 700 m (2,300 ft) long narrow-gauge railway which branched off to a local paper mill, was also dismantled. Janowice Wielkie was re-electrified between 1965–1966.

In 2016, the station was modernised with new platforms and facilities. Between 2023–2024, during the reconstruction of a railway tunnel in Trzcińsko, Janowice Wielkie temporarily served as a terminus for all westbound train services. During the line closure, a replacement bus service operated to Jelenia Góra and Szlarska Poręba Górna.

== Train services ==
The station is served by the following services:

- Regional services (KD) Wrocław - Wałbrzych - Jelenia Góra
- Regional services (KD) Wrocław - Wałbrzych - Jelenia Góra - Szklarska Poręba Górna
- Regional services (PR) Szklarska Poręba Górna - Jelenia Góra - Wrocław Główny - Poznań Główny
