= Pastewnik, Lower Silesian Voivodeship =

Pastewnik
- Village
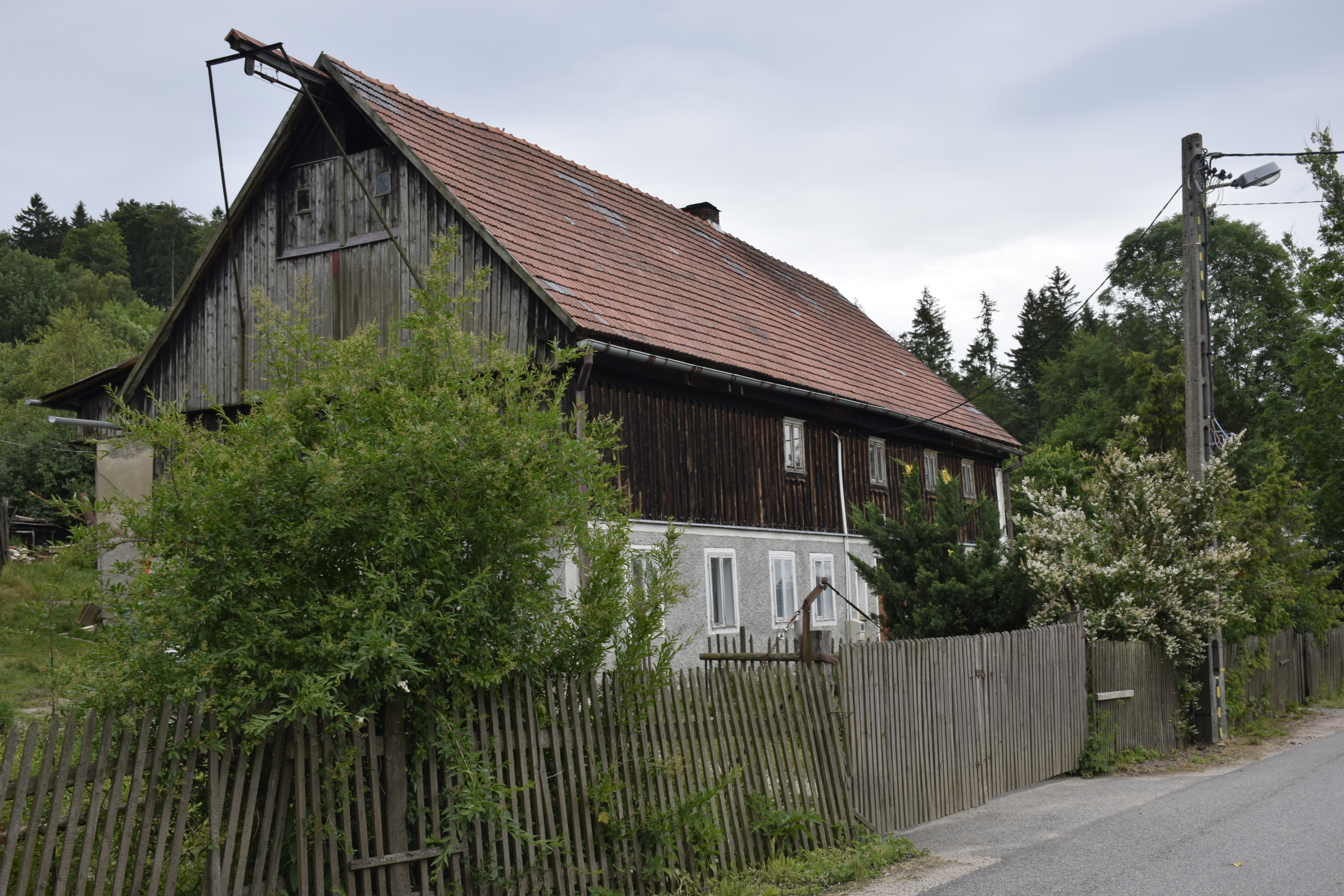
- House by road

- Location within Poland
- Coordinates: 50°53′N 16°2′E
- Country: Poland
- Voivodeship: Lower Silesian
- County: Kamienna Góra
- Gmina: Marciszów

Pastewnik [pasˈtɛvnik] is a village in the administrative district of Gmina Marciszów, within Kamienna Góra County, Lower Silesian Voivodeship, in south-western Poland.

== Gallery ==
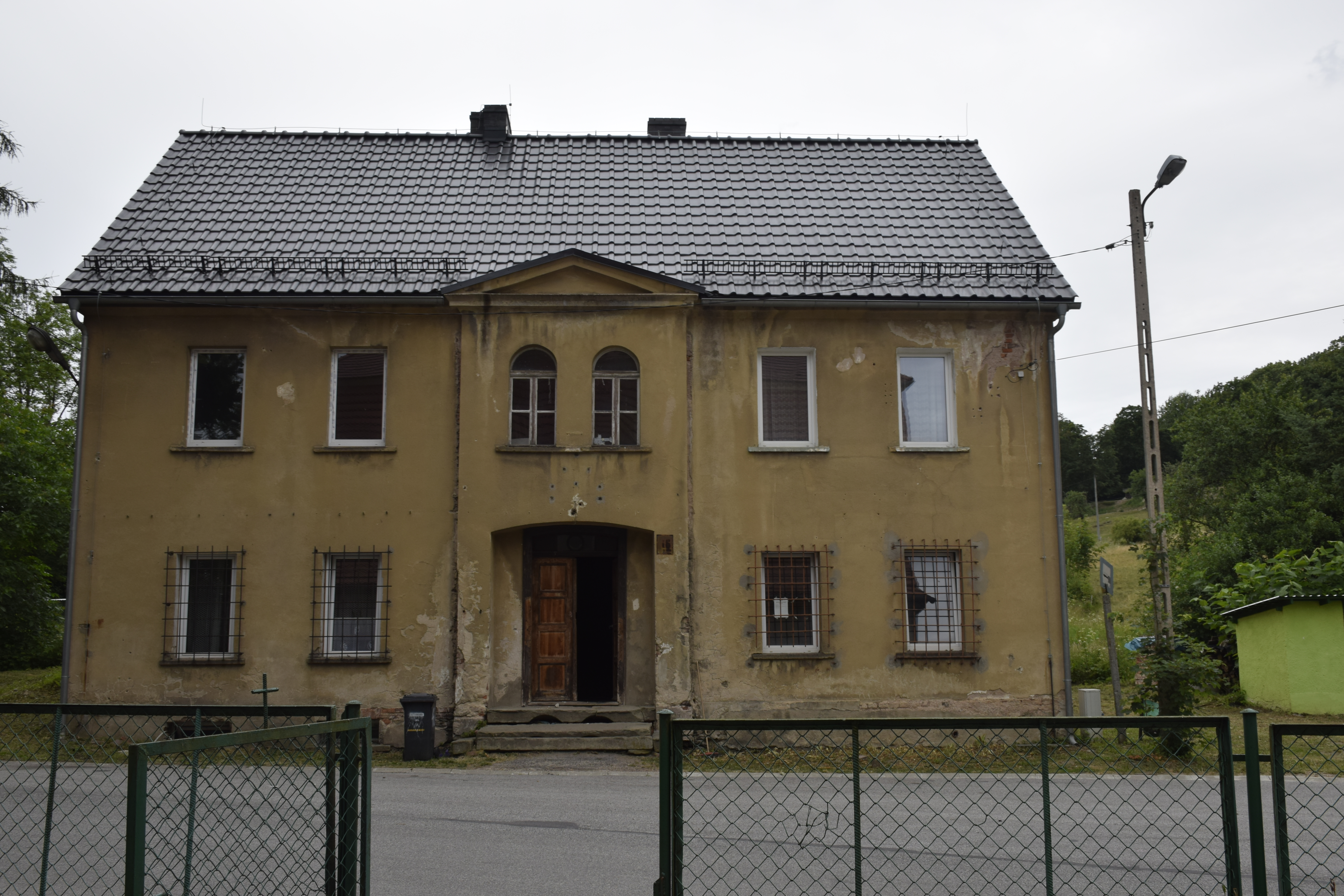
House by road

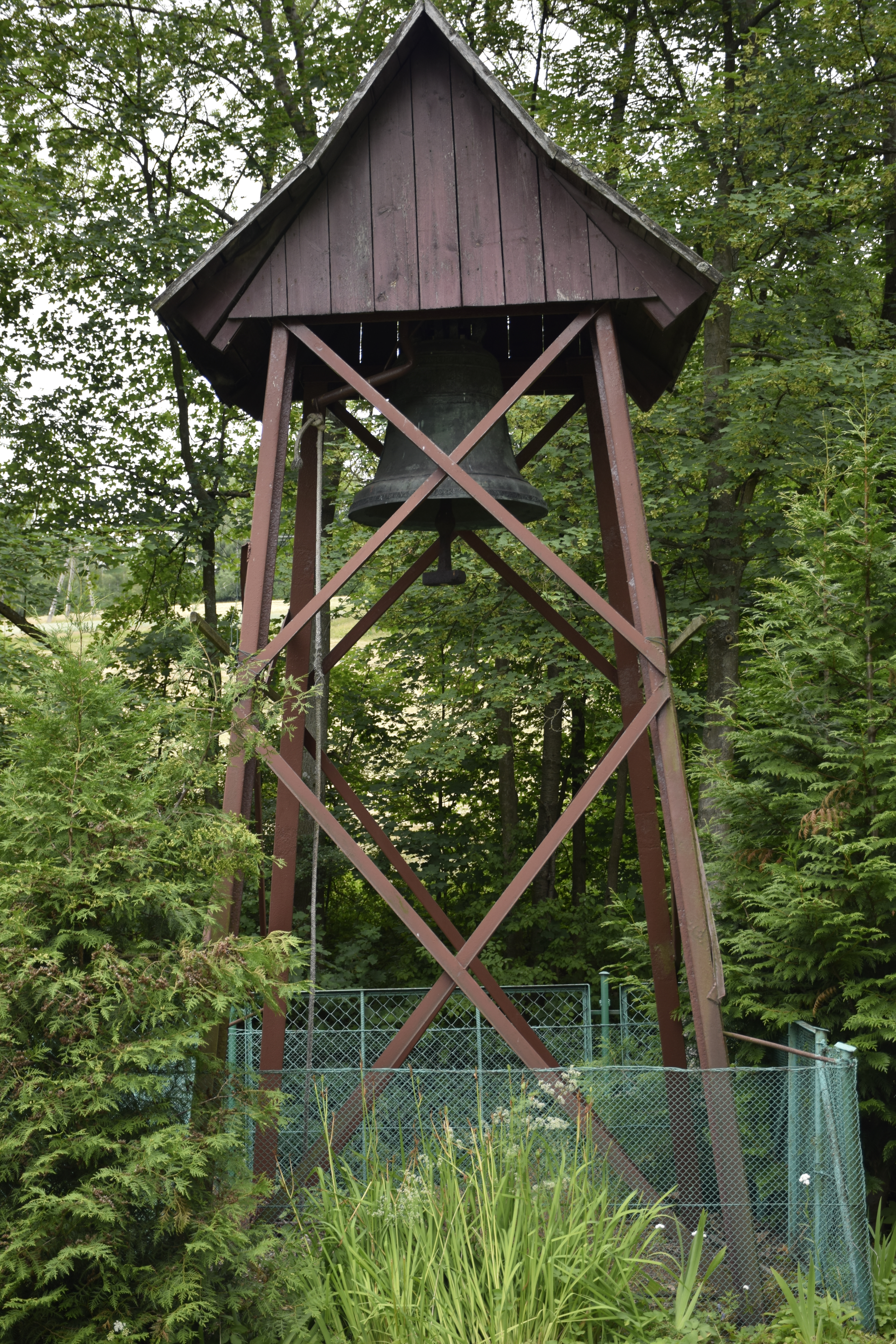
Bell tower

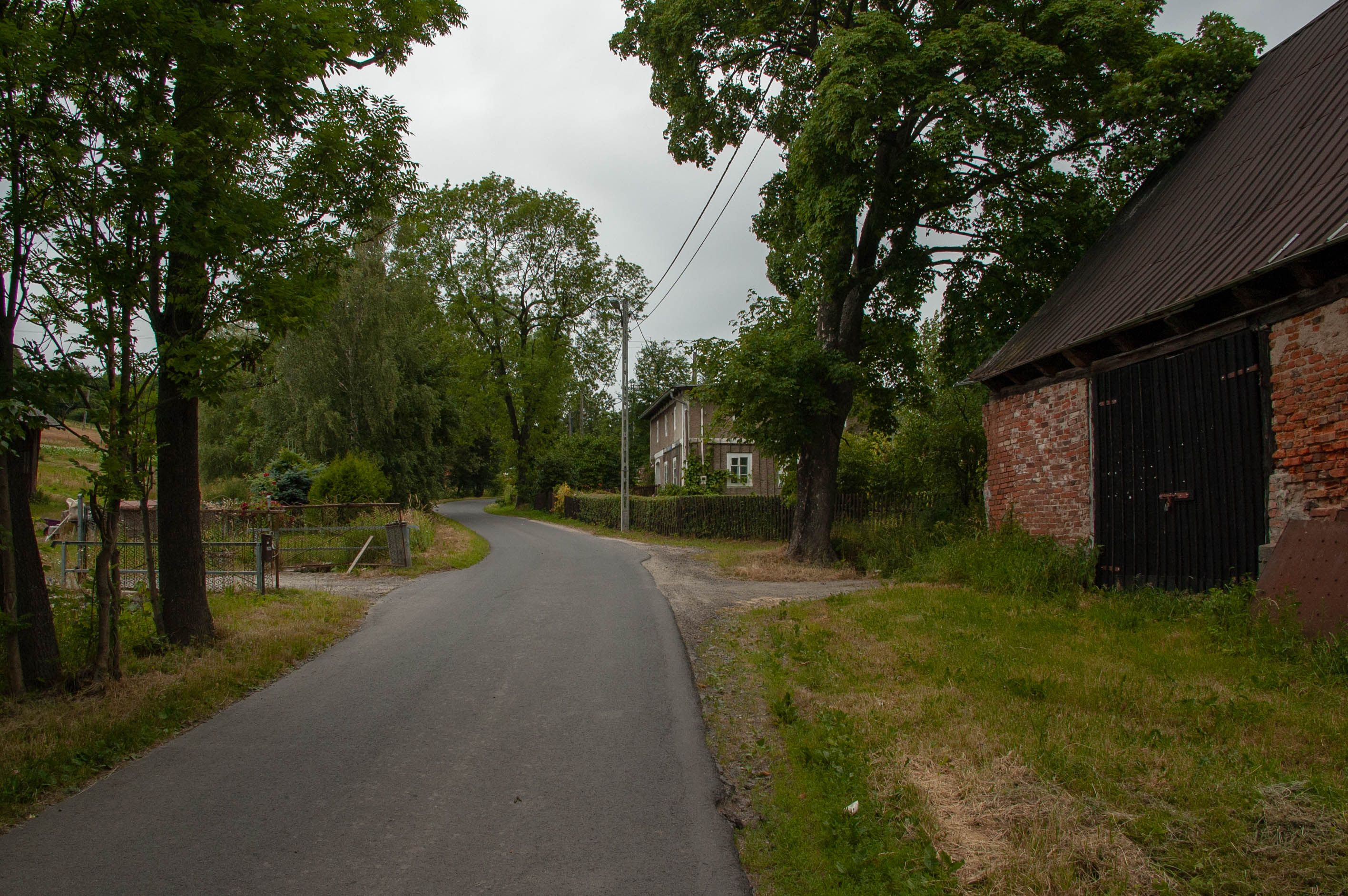
Road
