= Domanów =

- Village
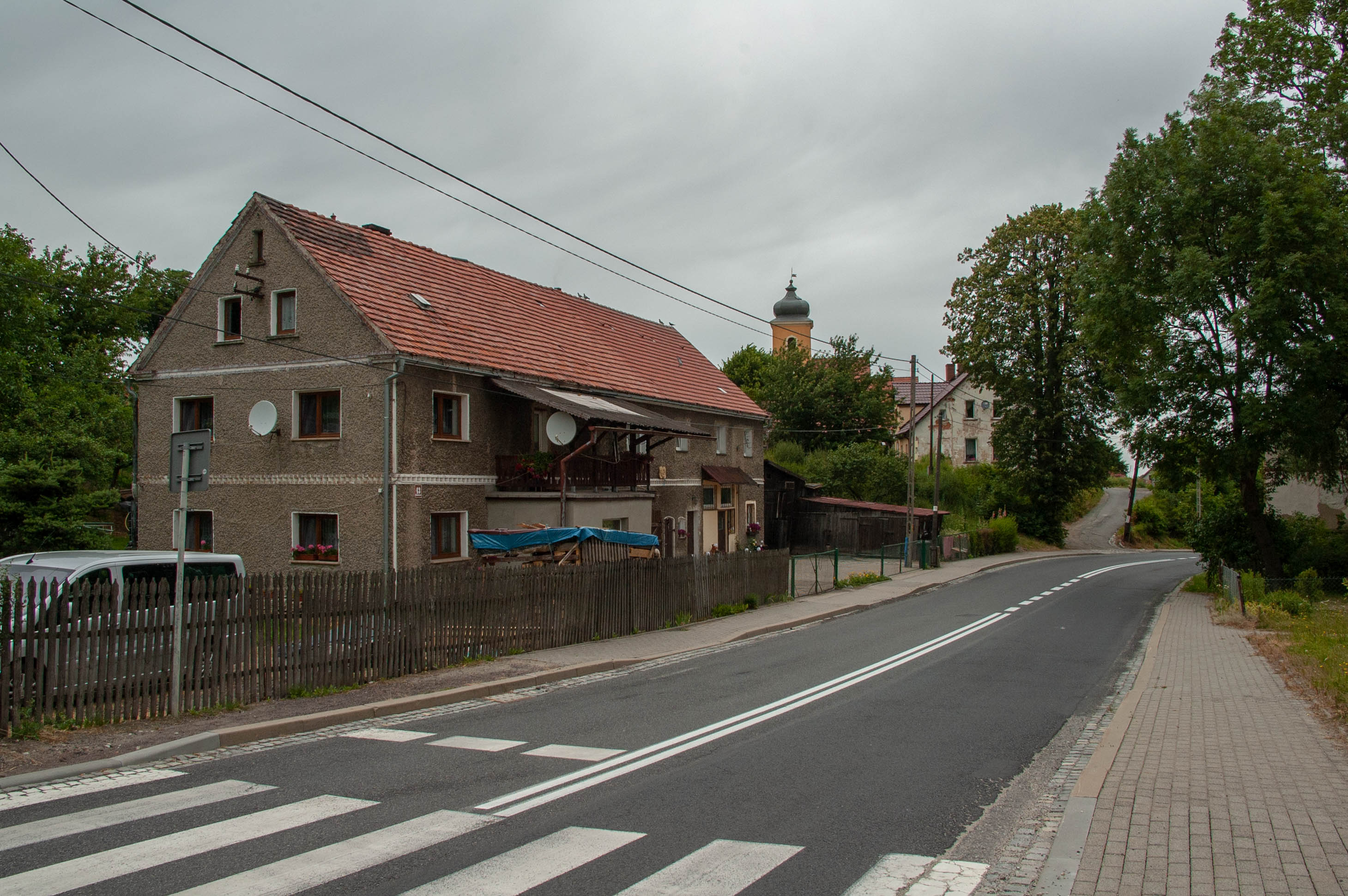
- Road with a house and church in the distance

- Location within Poland
- Coordinates: 50°52′N 16°4′E
- Country: Poland
- Voivodeship: Lower Silesian
- County: Kamienna Góra
- Gmina: Marciszów
- Time zone: UTC+1 (CET)
  - Summer (DST): UTC+2 (CEST)
- Vehicle registration: DKA

Domanów [dɔˈmanuf] is a village in the administrative district of Gmina Marciszów, within Kamienna Góra County, Lower Silesian Voivodeship, in south-western Poland.

== Gallery ==
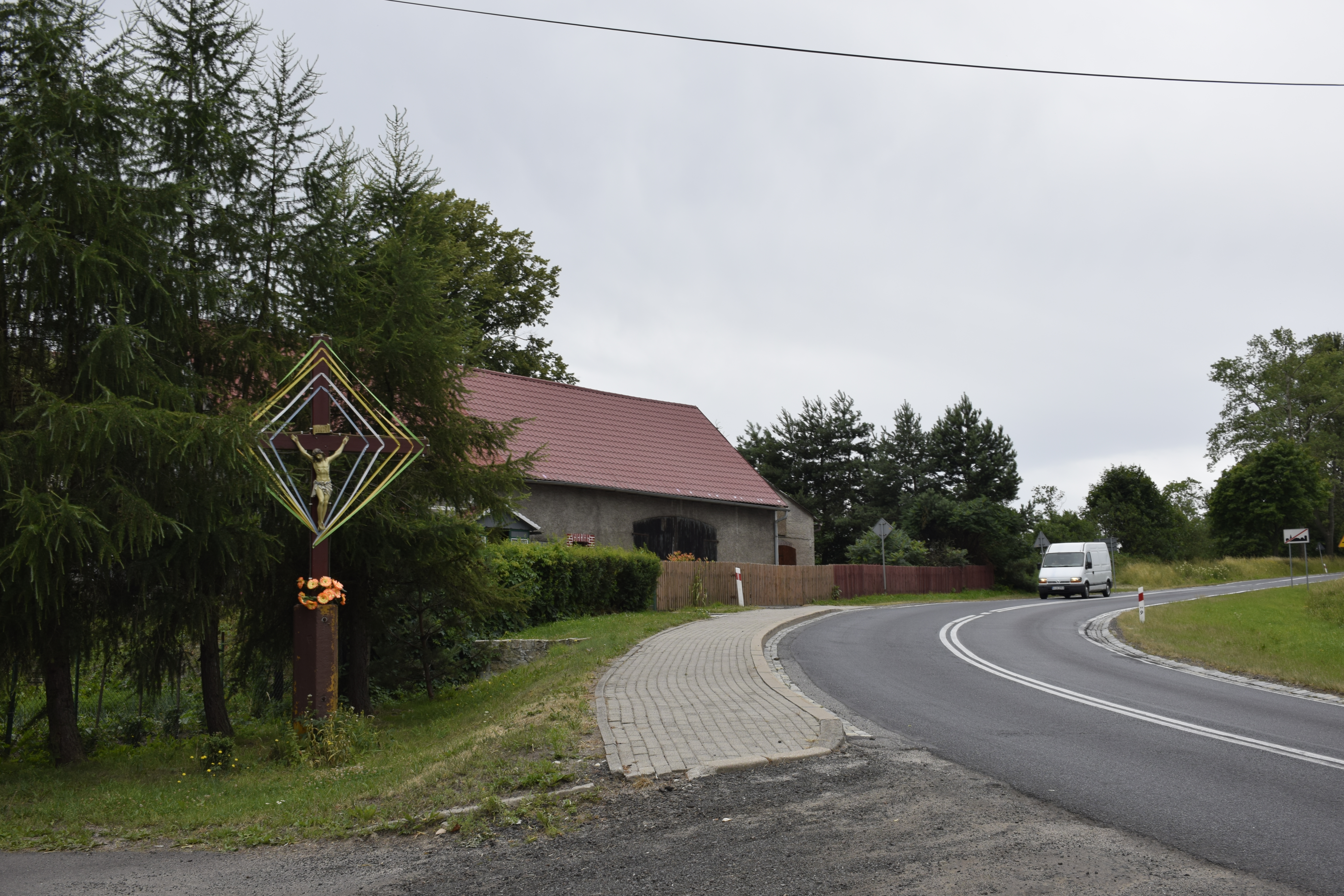
Cross by the road

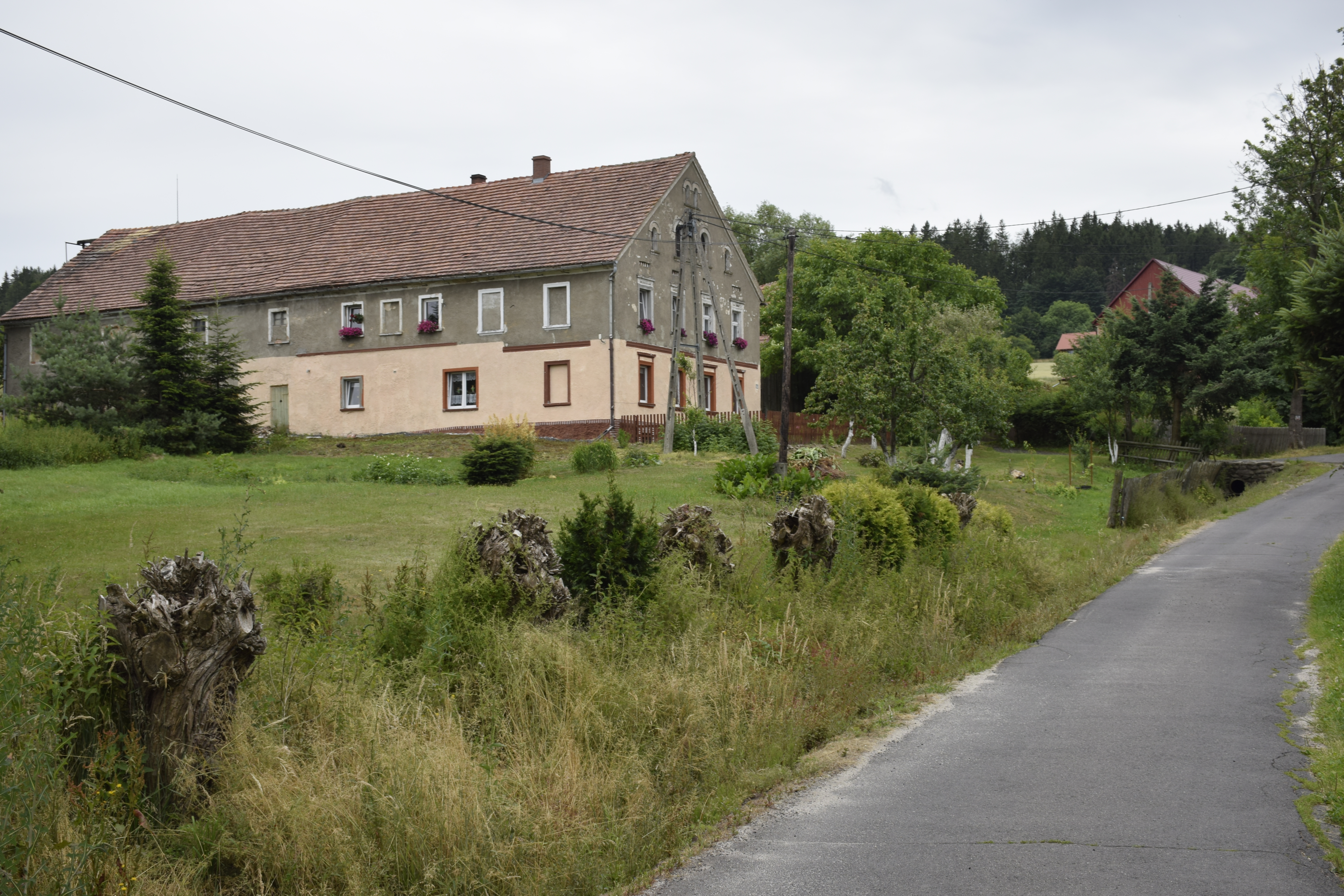
House

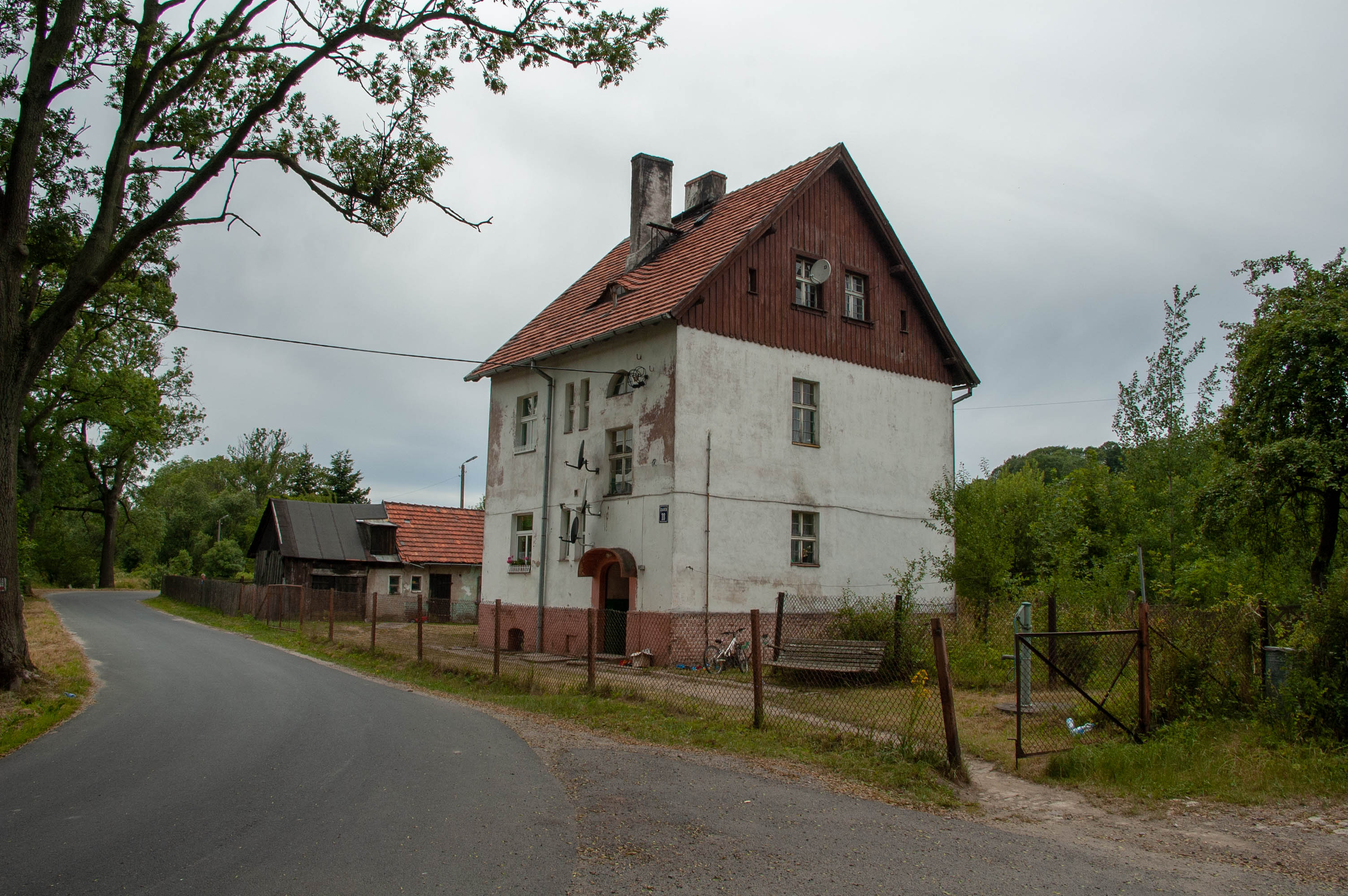
House with garden
