= Boguszów-Gorce Zachód railway station =

Railway station in Gorce, Boguszów-Gorce, Poland

Boguszów-Gorce Zachód
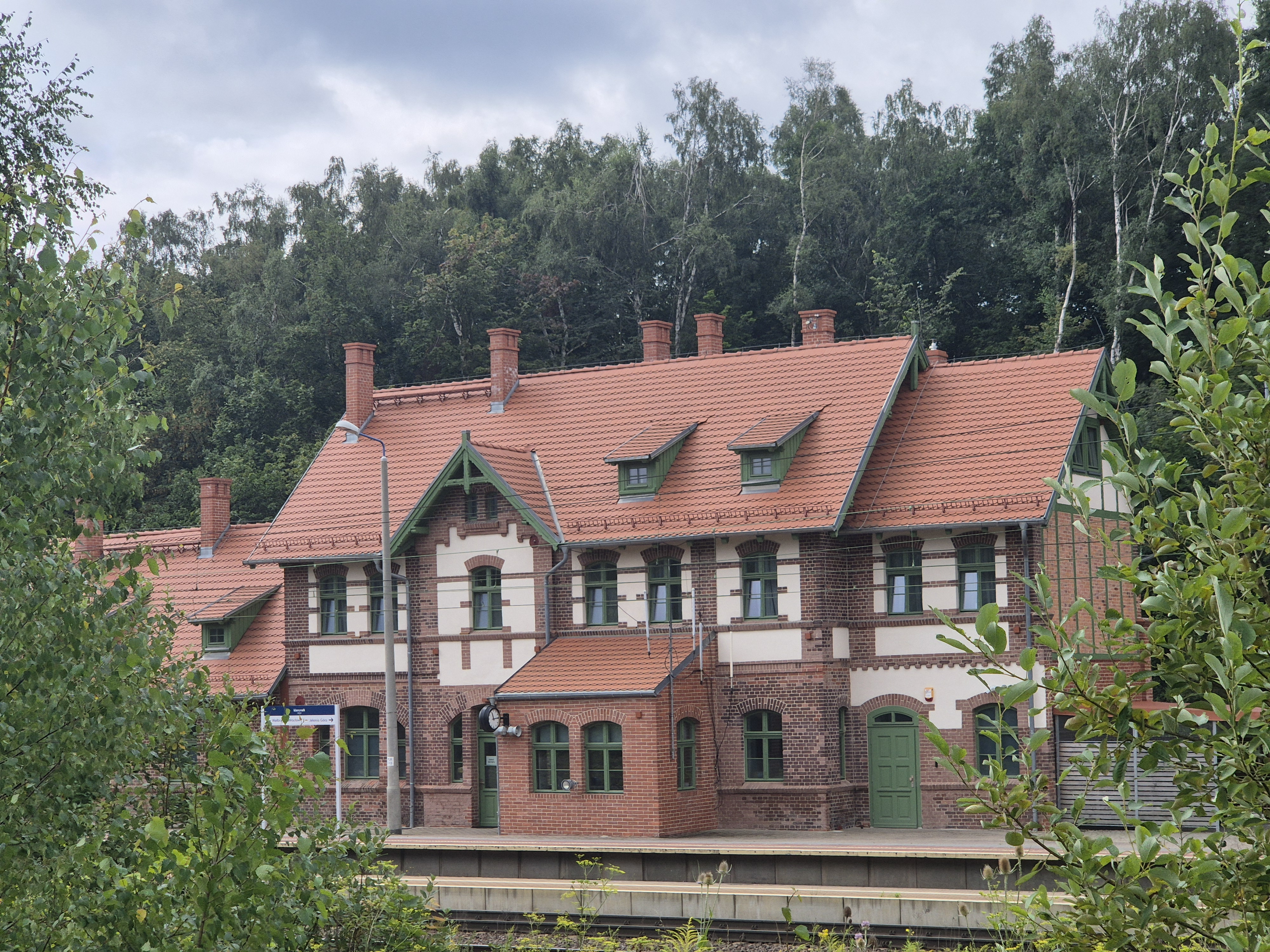
- Station building

General information
- Location: Gorce, Boguszów-Gorce, Lower Silesian Voivodeship; Poland
- Coordinates: 50°45′42.9″N 16°10′06.4″E
- Owner: Polish State Railways
- Line: Wrocław Świebodzki–Zgorzelec railway
- Platforms: 2

History
- Opened: 15 August 1867
- Former names: Gustavgrube (1867–1897); Rothenbach (1897–1914); Rothenbach (Schlesien) (1914–1945); Czernino (1945–1947); Gorce (1947–1974); Boguszów Gorce Zachód (1974–2016)

Services
| Preceding station | KD | Following station |
|---|---|---|
| Boguszów-Gorce towards Wrocław Główny | D6 | Witków Śląski towards Jelenia Góra |
| Boguszów-Gorce towards Wrocław Główny | D60 | Witków Śląski towards Szklarska Poręba Górna |
Location
- Location within Poland Location within Lower Silesian Voivodeship

Boguszów-Gorce Zachód lit. 'Boguszów-Gorce West' (German: Rothenbach) is a railway station in the Gorce district of Boguszów-Gorce, Wałbrzych County, within the Lower Silesian Voivodeship in south-western Poland.

A 420 m (1,380 ft) siding branches west of the station to Czarny Bór KSSD, a mine in Czarny Bór. It is designated as PKP railway line 976.

== History ==
The station building was built in 1885. The station was opened by Prussian State Railways as Gustavgrube on 15 August 1867, originally part of the historical Silesian Mountain Railway. In 1897 the station was renamed to Rothenbach, which was renamed to Rothenbach (Schlesien) for designation for 1914.

After World War II, the area came under Polish administration. As a result, the station was taken over by Polish State Railways. It was renamed to Czernino in 1945, then Gorce in 1947. In 1974, the station was renamed to Boguszów Gorce Zachód, this name was give a hyphen making it Boguszów-Gorce in 2016.

On 20 September 2019, Polish State Railways (PKP) announced the renovation and modernistation of the station building, at a cost of around 8.8 million Polish złoty. It was completed on 29 March 2021.

== Train services ==
The station is served by the following services:

- Regional services (KD) Wrocław - Wałbrzych - Jelenia Góra
- Regional services (KD) Wrocław - Wałbrzych - Jelenia Góra - Szklarska Poręba Górna
