= Boguszów-Gorce Wschód–Mieroszów railway =

Railway in Lower Silesia, Poland

- View of the railway's route from the slope of Dzikowiec Wielki

Overview
- Status: Operational
- Owner: PKP Polskie Linie Kolejowe
- Line number: PKP 291
- Locale: Lower Silesian Voivodeship, Poland
- Termini: Boguszów-Gorce Wschód; Mieroszów

Service
- Type: Heavy rail

Technical
- Line length: 15.130 km (9.401 mi)
- Track gauge: 1,435 mm (4 ft 8 1/2 in) standard gauge
- Electrification: 15 kV 16⅔ Hz AC (1914–1945, dismantled after 1945)
- Operating speed: 70 km/h (43 mph)
Route map

Boguszów-Gorce Wschód–Mieroszów railway is a single-track, non-electrified, secondary railway connecting the railway stations of Boguszów-Gorce Wschód and Mieroszów.

The railway is located in the Lower Silesian Voivodeship within the operational area of the PKP Polskie Linie Kolejowe, headquartered in Wałbrzych.

It is a section of the former railway from Wałbrzych Szczawienko to Meziměstí, originally measuring 34.501 km, which is currently in use for freight and maintenance traffic. The section between Wałbrzych and Boguszów was dismantled in 1994 and formally decommissioned on 23 January 2002.

The railway was built between 1871 and 1875 by the private Wrocław–Świdnica–Świebodzice Railway Company. It was part of a commercial trade route connecting the Baltic port of Szczecin with the Adriatic port of Trieste. The route connected industry in northern Bohemia with the mines of the Lower Silesian Coal Basin.

== Characteristics ==
=== Geographical route ===
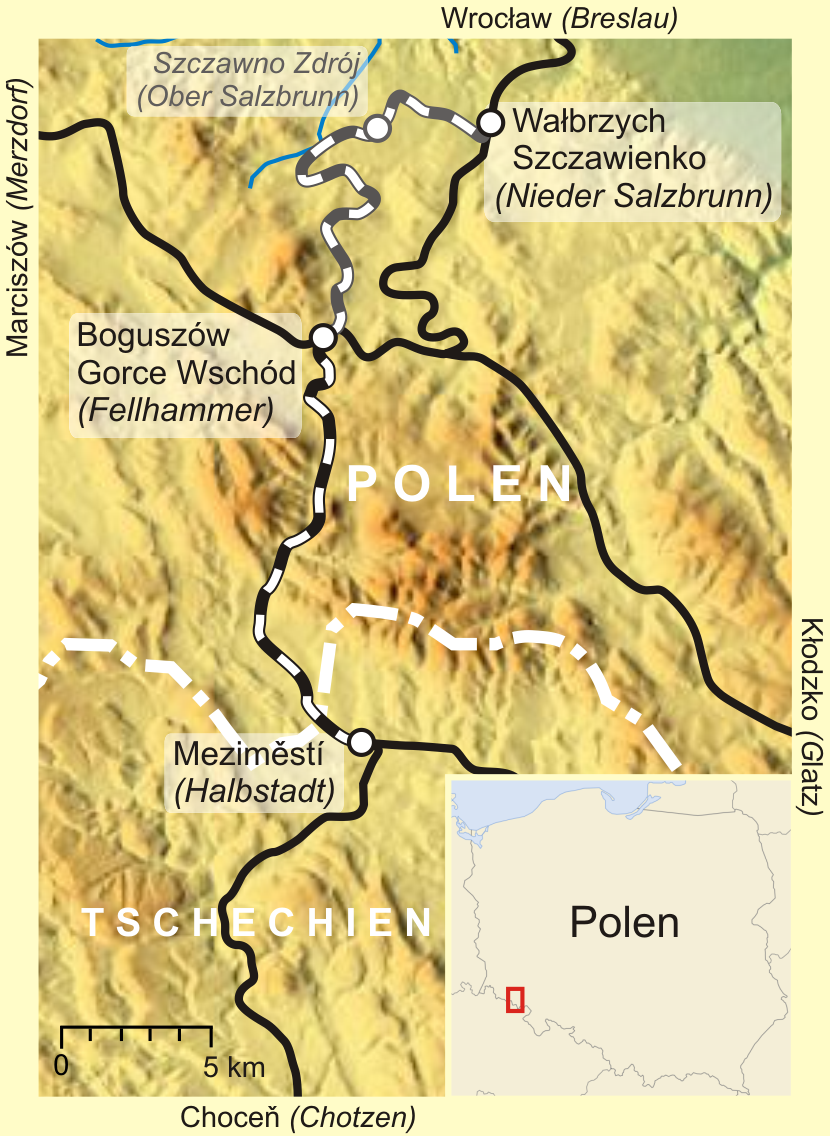
Schematic map of the railway's route

==== Discontinued section ====
The railway began at the Wałbrzych Szczawienko railway station, located on the route of the Wrocław–Świdnica–Świebodzice railway. After a 90° turn to the right (west), the railway's track ran over two viaducts spanning the roads from Wałbrzych to Świdnica and from Szczawno-Zdrój to Szczawienko. The second viaduct crosses the border between Wałbrzych and Szczawno-Zdrój. Then, after a slightly gentler turn, also 90° to the left (south), the route reached the Szczawno Śląskie Zdrój railway station, located at the intersection of four local roads. Further along, the railway partially followed the Czyżynka stream valley, and then, making wide turns, it wound around the northeastern slopes of Chełmiec. There was the Biały Kamień railway station on this section. Further on, the railway ran a short distance west of Sobięcin across many bridges and viaducts spanning roads and waterways. Then, through a deep, artificially created ravine, the railway reached the Boguszów-Gorce Wschód railway station.

==== Existing section ====
The railway branches off from Boguszów-Gorce Wschód railway station and heads south. The route traverses the pass between Dzikowiec Wielki and Kamienna Hill via a series of wide turns. The track then crosses the hill extending from the Dzikowiec Massif and Lesista Wielka, separating the Unisław Plateau from the Kuźnica Basin, via a single-track tunnel (262 m long, with a masonry lining) – the only one on the entire railway. From Unisław Śląski through Kowalowa, Mieroszów, and Golińsk, the track runs through the Ścinawka river valley, parallel to present-day national road 35, the continuation of which on the Czech side has the status of a local road.

=== Topography of the railway ===
- Wałbrzych Szczawienko – 377 m above sea level
- Szczawno-Zdrój – 425 m above sea level
- Biały Kamień – 490 m above sea level
- Boguszów-Gorce Wschód – 546 m above sea level
- Unisław Śląski – 565 m above sea level
- Mieroszów – 496 m above sea level
- Meziměstí – 437 m above sea level

=== Technical specifications ===
- Line category: secondary
- Electrification: until 1945, currently none

=== Technical condition ===
In mid-2017, representatives of the regional transport organizer (the Marshal's Office of the Lower Silesian Voivodeship) described the condition of the railway between Boguszów-Gorce and Meziměstí as "unsatisfactory for daily passenger service". On most of the route (12 out of 15 km), trains were subject to a speed limit of 30 km/h. Only on a small section was it permissible for trains to travel at a speed of 70 km/h.

== History ==
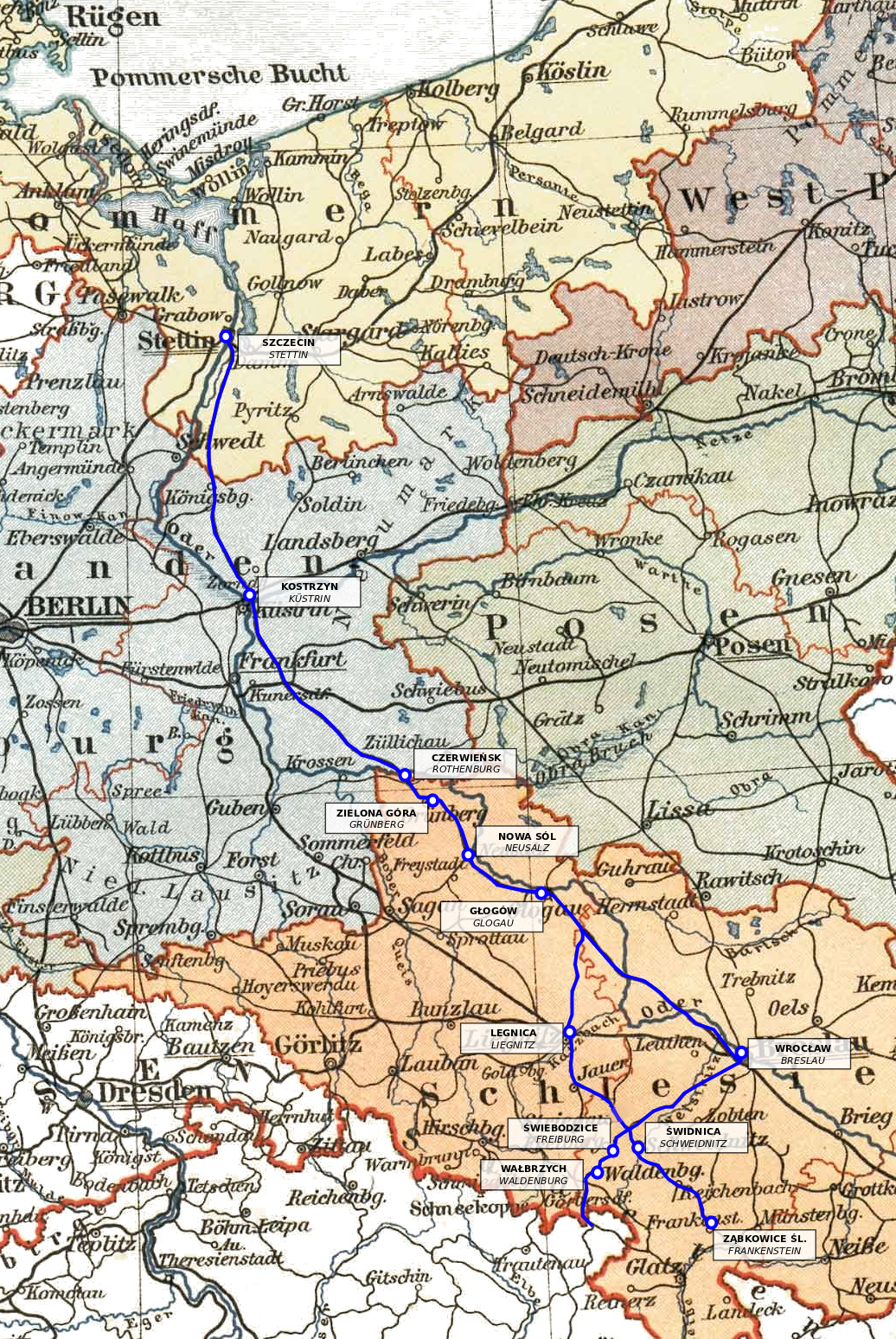
Routes of the Wrocław–Świdnica–Świebodzice Railway Company in 1886

=== Origins ===
The first railways in German territories were privately owned. The state regulated the activities of railway companies by requiring them to obtain concessions for the construction and operation of new lines.

In 1835, the idea of connecting ports on the Baltic Sea with those on the Adriatic Sea via the shortest possible railway route to stimulate trade gained popularity in Prussia. The construction of a railway leading from Szczecin to the border with the Austrian Empire became one of the goals of the Wrocław–Świdnica–Świebodzice Railway Company. The company was established in Wrocław in March 1837 under the leadership of the Silesian industrialist Gustav Heinrich von Ruffer.

As early as 1858, in addition to its main line, the company already possessed the beginnings of a future trunk line, running from the first railway node on the territory of present-day Poland in Jaworzyna Śląska to Ząbkowice Śląskie. In its efforts to expand this route, the company competed for priority in securing a connection to the border at Międzylesie near Kłodzko with the Upper Silesian Railway, which was favored by the state authorities.

For years, the possibility of building a cross-border railway was blocked for both state-owned and private companies. Austria consistently rejected requests to build border checkpoints with Prussia. The problem was resolved by Prussia's victory in the Austro-Prussian War and the Peace of Prague (1866), which removed the Vienna government from having a say in matters concerning the German states and secured a privileged position for Prussia. At that time, the concession for the Wrocław–Ústí nad Orlicí railway, with a border crossing in Międzylesie, was granted to the state-backed Upper Silesian Railway, which built the route between 1871 and 1876. Consequently, the company applied for a concession for an alternative route to the Austrian border, which was an extension of the Świebodzice railway previously extended to Wałbrzych.

=== Construction ===
On 17 September 1873, the Wrocław–Świdnica–Świebodzice Railway Company obtained a concession to build a new railway running from Szczawienko through Biały Kamień, Kuźnice Świdnickie, and Mieroszów to Meziměstí; there the railway was to connect with the network of the Privileged Austro-Hungarian State Railway Company. A new route was built from the Wałbrzych Szczawienko railway station to Boguszów-Gorce to free the company from the need to use the tracks of the state-owned Silesian Mountain Railway.

The route was laid out in difficult mountainous terrain. The railway was routed as close as possible to the estate of the Hochberg family, which held the largest shares in the Wrocław–Świdnica–Świebodzice Railway Company. The estate included forests, mines (including Konradów, Sobięcin, and Kuźnice), and the Szczawno-Zdrój health resort. It was also important to bypass the center of the Wałbrzych Basin, which was congested with local traffic.

Construction of the single-track railway took four years. The route and the railway border checkpoint in Starostín were opened on 15 May 1878.

=== 1878–1945 ===
The infrastructure along the route between Wałbrzych and Meziměstí was nationalized and transferred to the Prussian state railways in 1884.

Between 1912 and 1914, the entire railway was electrified on a trial basis, as one of the first in Prussia, and, together with nearby routes, served as a testing ground for electric traction. Among other things, the world's first electric multiple units designed for intercity routes operated between Wałbrzych and Meziměstí. Electric train service was launched on 1 June 1914. The electrification used a typical German alternating current system (15 kV, 16⅔ Hz).

=== 1945–2004 ===
After World War II and the change of national borders, the railway was incorporated into the assets of the Polish State Railways. The electrical system was dismantled and transported deep into the Soviet Union as Soviet war trophies.

The section from Boguszów to Mieroszów served local connections between Wałbrzych and Mieroszów after the war, and from 1990 to 2004 also cross-border trains to the border town of Meziměstí. Between 1997 and 2001, the route was periodically used by express trains from Wrocław to Prague.

The route between Wałbrzych and Boguszów served as a detour for Wrocław Świebodzki–Zgorzelec railway. After the main railway was re-electrified in 1965, the railway's track lost its significance and was dismantled in the summer of 1994. A 13.5 km section of trackbed, stripped of all railway infrastructure, and 13 viaducts, which were in poor technical condition at the time, were left behind.

In the Supplement to Official Timetables from 2001, the railway was listed under the name "291. [Wałbrzych Szczawienko –] Boguszów Gorce Wschód – Mieroszów – State Border".

In accordance with the provisions of the Act on the Restructuring of the State-Owned Enterprise Polish State Railways, PKP Polskie Linie Kolejowe was established on 1 October 2001 and entrusted with the management of the State Treasury's railways. Unlike many other railways, the previously dismantled section of Boguszów-Gorce Wschód–Mieroszów railway was not contributed to the company and was therefore deemed unnecessary for its operations.

The railway on the section from Wałbrzych Szczawienko to Boguszów-Gorce Wschód was formally decommissioned on 23 January 2002. Some of the plots of land directly adjacent to the former trackbed were sold.

During a press conference at the Lower Silesian Regional Transport Company in Wrocław regarding the implementation of the 2003/2004 timetable in the voivodeship in mid-December 2003, the company's management announced the discontinuation of the Wałbrzych–Meziměstí passenger service the following year. The decision was justified by "negligible ridership" on the trains and the "dismal condition of the track". Regular passenger trains ran on the railway for the last time on 31 March 2004.

In 2004, the organization and financing of local rail transport throughout Poland were transferred to voivodeship governments.

=== After 2004 ===
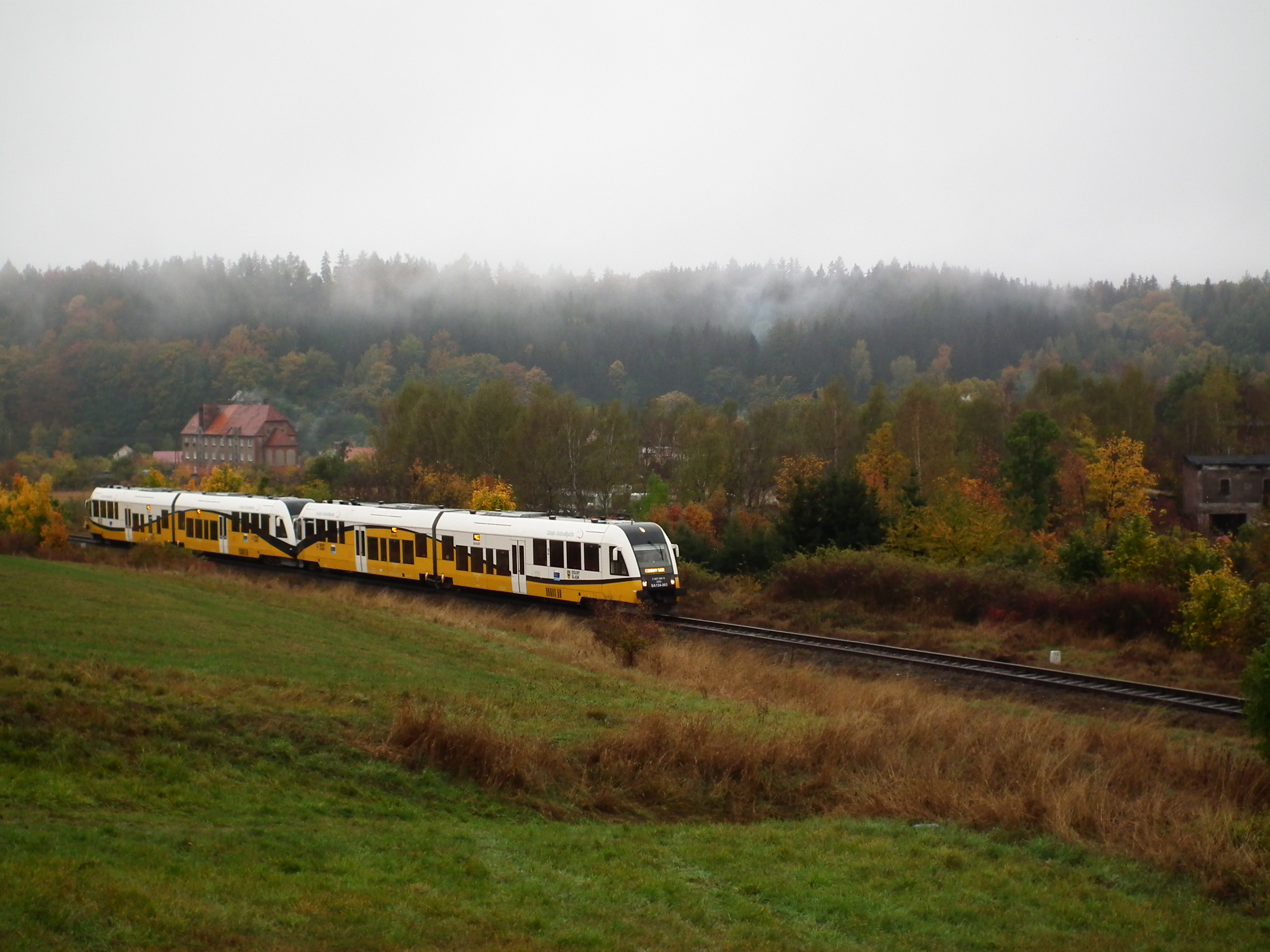
Special train of the Lower Silesian Railways on the railway near Mieroszów

In the first quarter of 2007, local governments (Wałbrzych County and the cities of Wałbrzych, Szczawno-Zdrój, and Boguszów-Gorce) launched an initiative to jointly implement a project titled "Construction of a recreational route along the railway embankment, including accompanying infrastructure, on the section: Wałbrzych – Szczawno-Zdrój – Boguszów-Gorce". On 26 June 2007, the parties signed a letter of intent regarding cooperation on the route's implementation and requested that the Polish State Railways transfer the former trackbed free of charge. The Polish State Railways, recognizing the opportunity to develop the plots of land remaining along the railway for a fee, refused to transfer the land free of charge. Instead, they offered to sell the plots to the county or to enter into a lease agreement once the legal status of the plots had been settled. It was noted that, due to emerging interest in rebuilding the railway by companies involved in aggregate extraction within the county, the proposal might be withdrawn.

In June 2018, the Lower Silesian Railways was set to launch a weekend tourist service from Wałbrzych to Meziměstí and Adršpach.

In 2019, the Lower Silesian Voivodeship declared its intention to take over the section from Szczawno Zdrój to Sobięcin. On 28 November 2019, an agreement was signed under which the Lower Silesian local government took over the railway.

In 2023, as part of the project to reconstruct an 800-meter section of national road 367 between Wałbrzych and Boguszów Gorce, known as the "serpentines," the company Eurovia demolished a historic 144-year-old red-brick viaduct under which the road ran. Thus, all plans and concepts for restoring traffic on Boguszów-Gorce Wschód–Mieroszów railway, as well as the possibility of using it as a low-gradient tourist and cycling route, were abandoned.

== Train operations ==
The railway has been classified by the Operations Department of PKP Polskie Linie Kolejowe as a "technological railway".

There has been no regular passenger train service on the railway since 31 March 2004. As of 2017, due to the poor technical condition of the railway, the regional transport operator has ruled out the possibility of introducing daily train service.
