= Sędzisław railway station =

Railway station in Sędzisław, Poland

Sędzisław
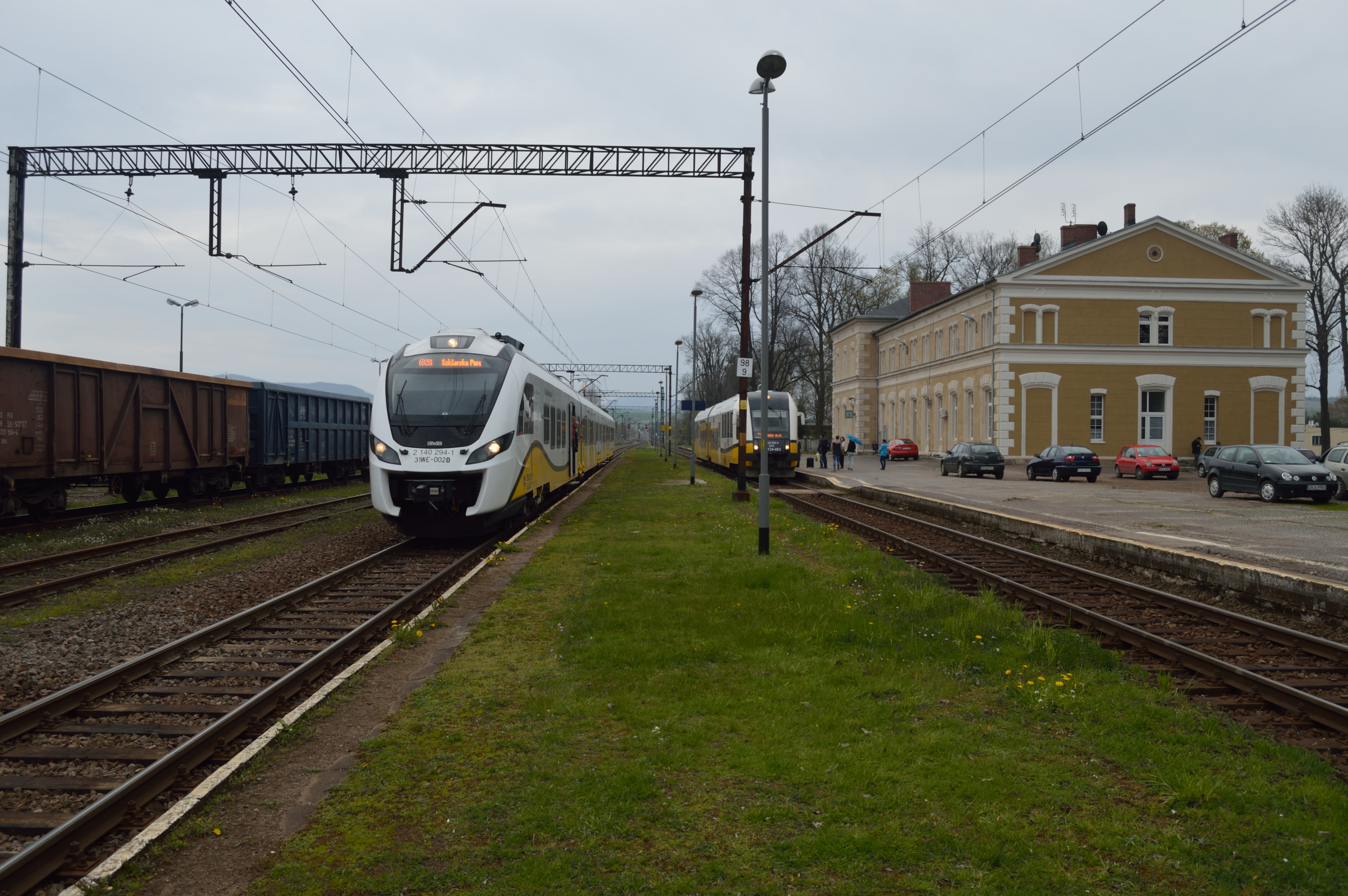
- Lower Silesian Railways 31WE bound for Szklarska Poręba Górna railway (left) and SA134 bound for Trutnov in May 2016 (right)

General information
- Location: Sędzisław, Lower Silesian Voivodeship; Poland
- Coordinates: 50°48′48.0″N 16°04′11.1″E
- Owner: Polish State Railways
- Lines: Wrocław Świebodzki–Zgorzelec railway; Kamienna Góra–Sędzisław railway (freight-only)
- Platforms: 3

History
- Opened: 15 August 1867
- Former names: Ruhbank (1867–1945); Rąbieniec (1945–1947)

Services
Preceding station	KD	Following station
Witków Śląski towards Wrocław Główny	D6	Marciszów towards Jelenia Góra
Witków Śląski towards Wrocław Główny	D60	Marciszów towards Szklarska Poręba Górna
Terminus	D66	Kamienna Góra towards Trutnov hl. n.
Location
- Location within Poland Location within Lower Silesian Voivodeship

Sędzisław (German: Ruhbank) is a railway station in the village of Sędzisław, Kamienna Góra County, within the Lower Silesian Voivodeship in south-western Poland.

== History ==
The station was opened by Prussian State Railways as Ruhbank on 15 August 1867, originally part of the historical Silesian Mountain Railway. The Kamienna Góra–Sędzisław railway opened on 29 December 1869. The neo-renaissance stone station building opened when the line opened. At the time, Sędzisław was the location of a transformer substation, directly opposite the station. Dating back to 1913, it powered the Silesian Mountain Railway. The site of the former substation is a sawmill and carpentry shop.

After World War II, the area came under Polish administration. As a result, the station was taken over by Polish State Railways. It was renamed to Rąbieniec in 1945, then to its modern name, Sędzisław, in 1947.

In April 2018, Lower Silesian Railways announced the extension of train services to Trutnov in the Czech Republic, running trains during the weekend and summer. This is part of KD route 66.

== Train services ==
The station is served by the following services:

- Regional services (KD) Wrocław - Wałbrzych - Jelenia Góra
- Regional services (KD) Wrocław - Wałbrzych - Jelenia Góra - Szklarska Poręba Górna
- Regional services (KD) Sędzisław - Královec - Trutnov
