= Boguszów-Gorce Wschód railway station =

Railway station in Kuźnice Świdnickie, Boguszów-Gorce, Poland

Boguszów-Gorce Wschód
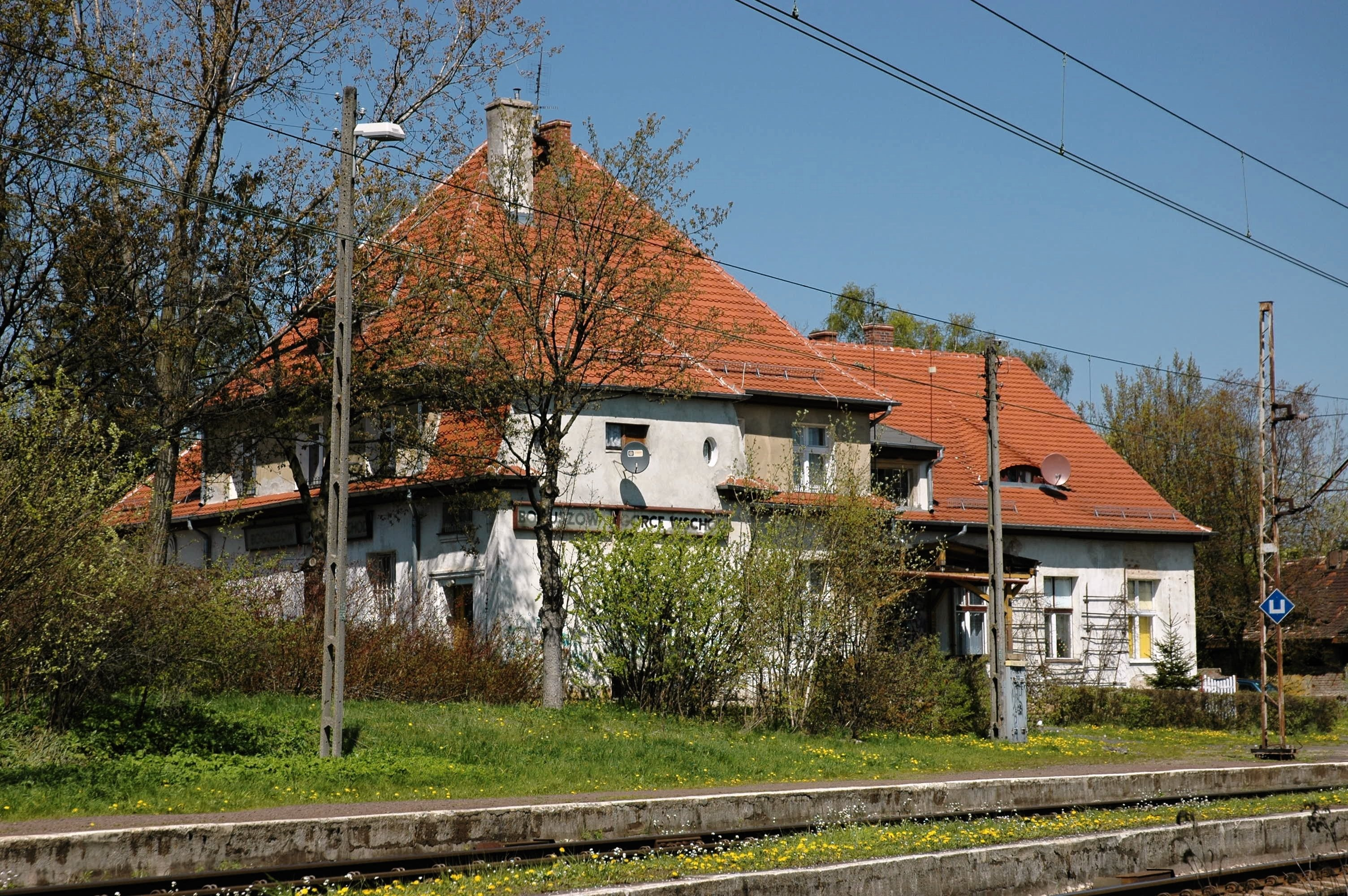
- Station building

General information
- Location: Kuźnice Świdnickie, Boguszów-Gorce, Lower Silesian Voivodeship; Poland
- Coordinates: 50°44′50.1″N 16°13′16.4″E
- Owner: Polish State Railways
- Lines: Wrocław Świebodzki–Zgorzelec railway; Boguszów-Gorce Wschód–Mieroszów railway
- Platforms: 3

History
- Opened: 15 August 1867
- Former names: Fellhammer (1867–1945); Kuźnica Górska (1945–1946); Kuźnice Świdnickie (1946–1974); Boguszów Gorce Wschód (1974–2016)

Services
Preceding station	KD	Following station
Wałbrzych Główny towards Wrocław Główny	D6	Boguszów-Gorce towards Jelenia Góra
Wałbrzych Główny towards Wrocław Główny	D60	Boguszów-Gorce towards Szklarska Poręba Górna
Location
- Location within Poland Location within Lower Silesian Voivodeship

Boguszów-Gorce Wschód lit. 'Boguszów-Gorce East' (German: Fellhammer) is a railway station in the Kuźnice Świdnickie district of Boguszów-Gorce, Wałbrzych County, within the Lower Silesian Voivodeship in south-western Poland.

The station also serves as the junction between the Wrocław Świebodzki–Zgorzelec railway and Boguszów-Gorce Wschód–Mieroszów railways.

== History ==
The station was opened by Prussian State Railways as Fellhammer on 15 August 1867, originally part of the historical Silesian Mountain Railway. The Boguszów-Gorce Wschód–Mieroszów railway opened in 1878.

After World War II, the area came under Polish administration. As a result, the station was taken over by Polish State Railways. It was renamed to Kuźnica Górska in 1945, then Kuźnice Świdnickie in 1946, and eventually to Boguszów Gorce Wschód in 1974. In 2016 the station was renamed to its modern name, Boguszów-Gorce Wschód. The name change only includes a hyphen.

== Train services ==
The station is served by the following services:

- Regional services (KD) Wrocław - Wałbrzych - Jelenia Góra
- Regional services (KD) Wrocław - Wałbrzych - Jelenia Góra - Szklarska Poręba Górna
