= Witków, Wałbrzych County =

Witków
- Village
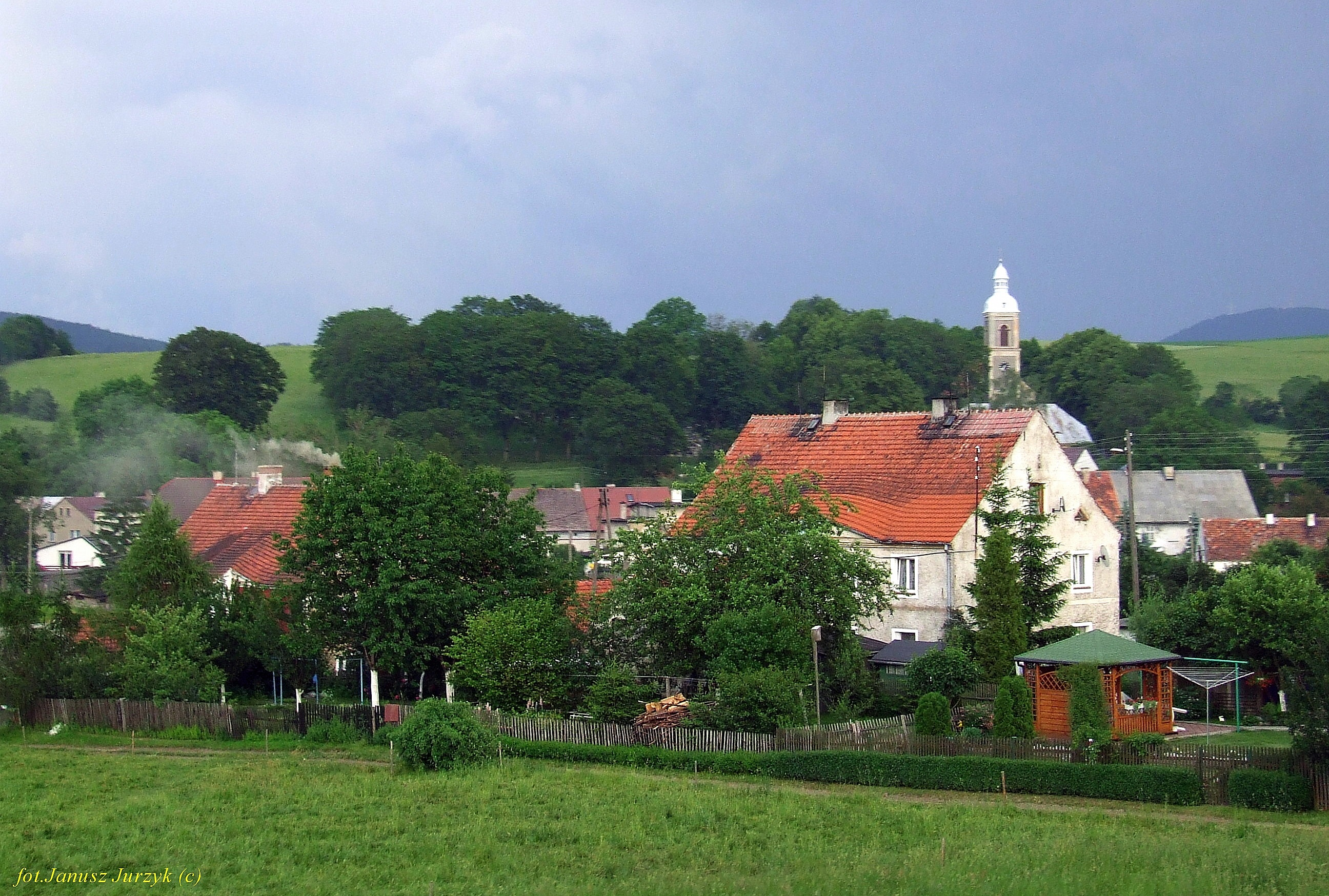
- Panorama of Witków

- Location within Poland
- Coordinates: 50°47′49″N 16°7′51″E
- Country: Poland
- Voivodeship: Lower Silesian
- County: Wałbrzych
- Gmina: Czarny Bór

Population (approx.)
  - Total: 1,000

Witków, [ˈvitkuf] sometimes Witków Śląski is a village in the administrative district of Gmina Czarny Bór, within Wałbrzych County, Lower Silesian Voivodeship, in south-western Poland.

== Transport ==
The village is served by Witków Śląski railway station.
