= Sędzisław =

- Village
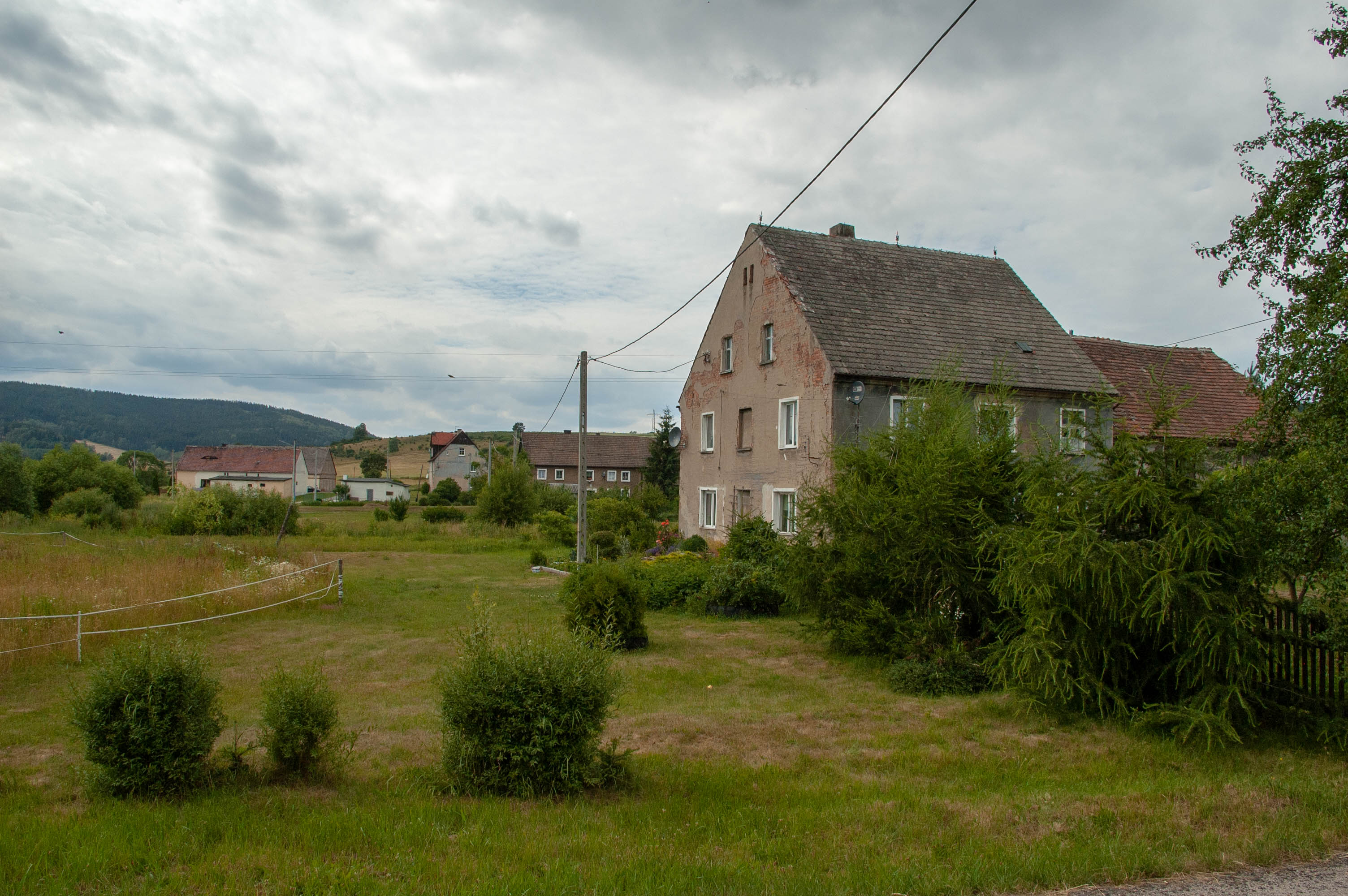
- Houses

- Location within Poland
- Coordinates: 50°49′N 16°4′E
- Country: Poland
- Voivodeship: Lower Silesian
- County: Kamienna Góra
- Gmina: Marciszów
- Elevation: 690 m (2,260 ft)

Sędzisław ([sɛnˈd͡ʑiswaf]) (German: Ruhbank) is a village in the administrative district of Gmina Marciszów, within Kamienna Góra County, Lower Silesian Voivodeship, in south-western Poland.

== Gallery ==
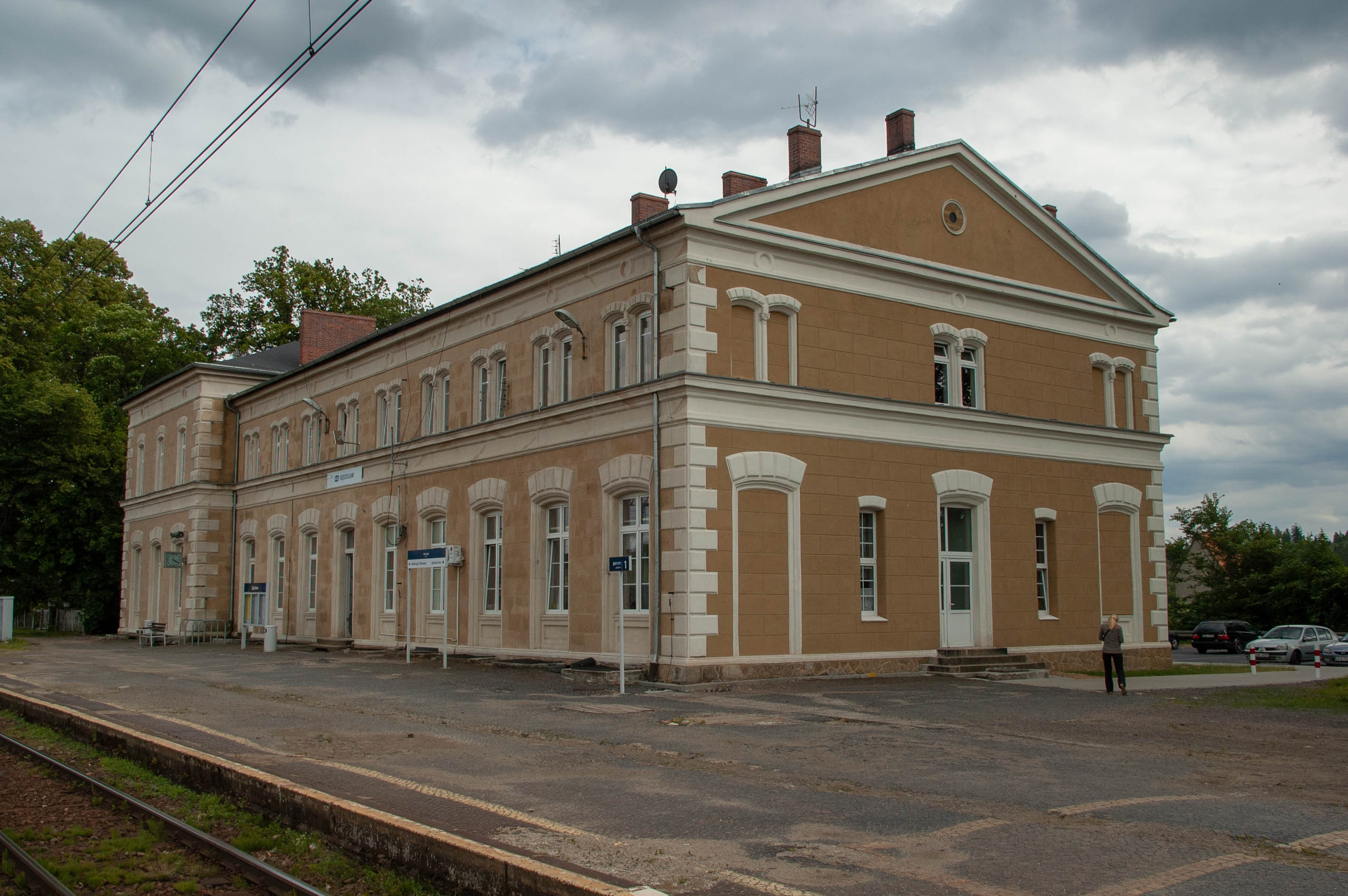
Sędzisław railway station

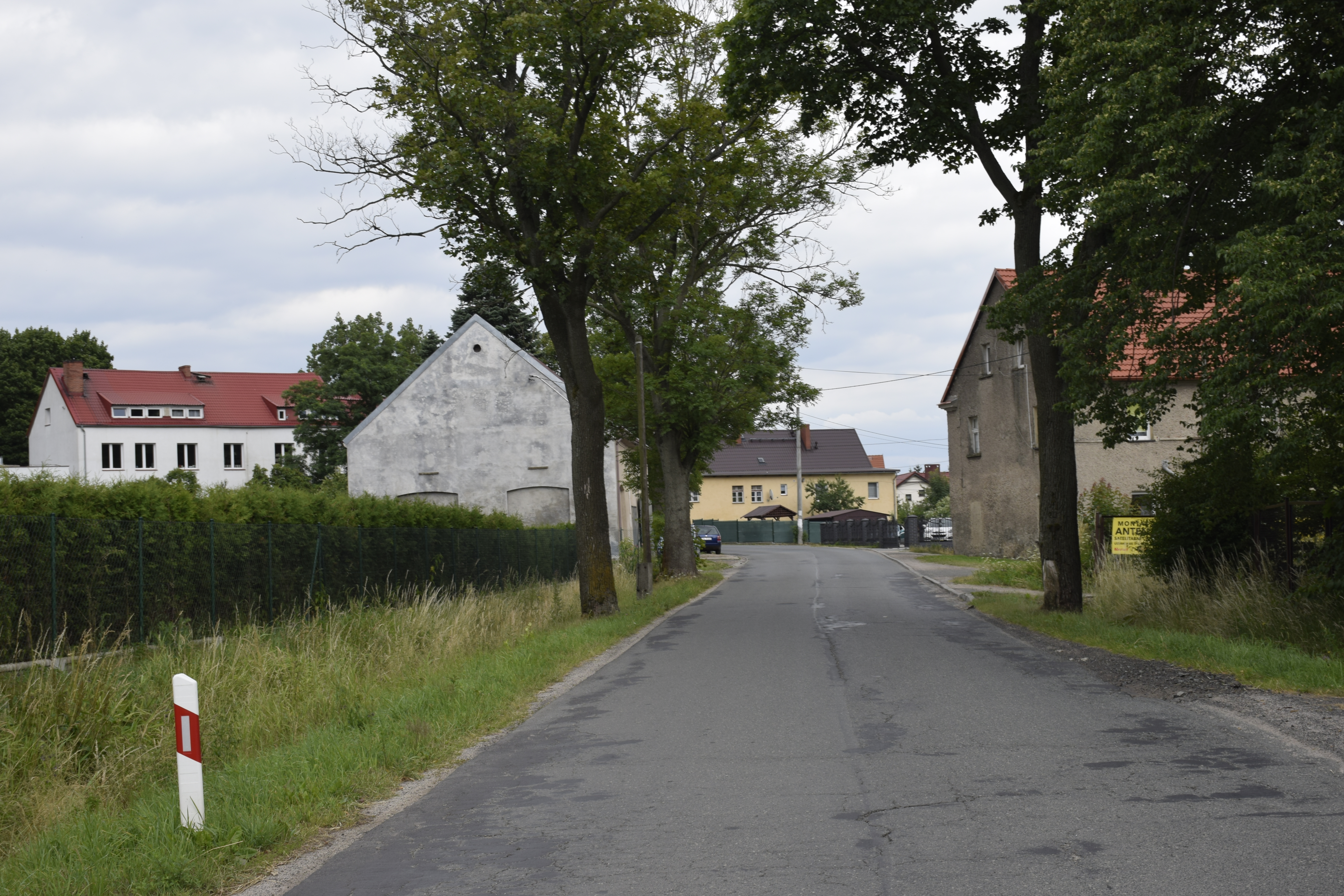
Street

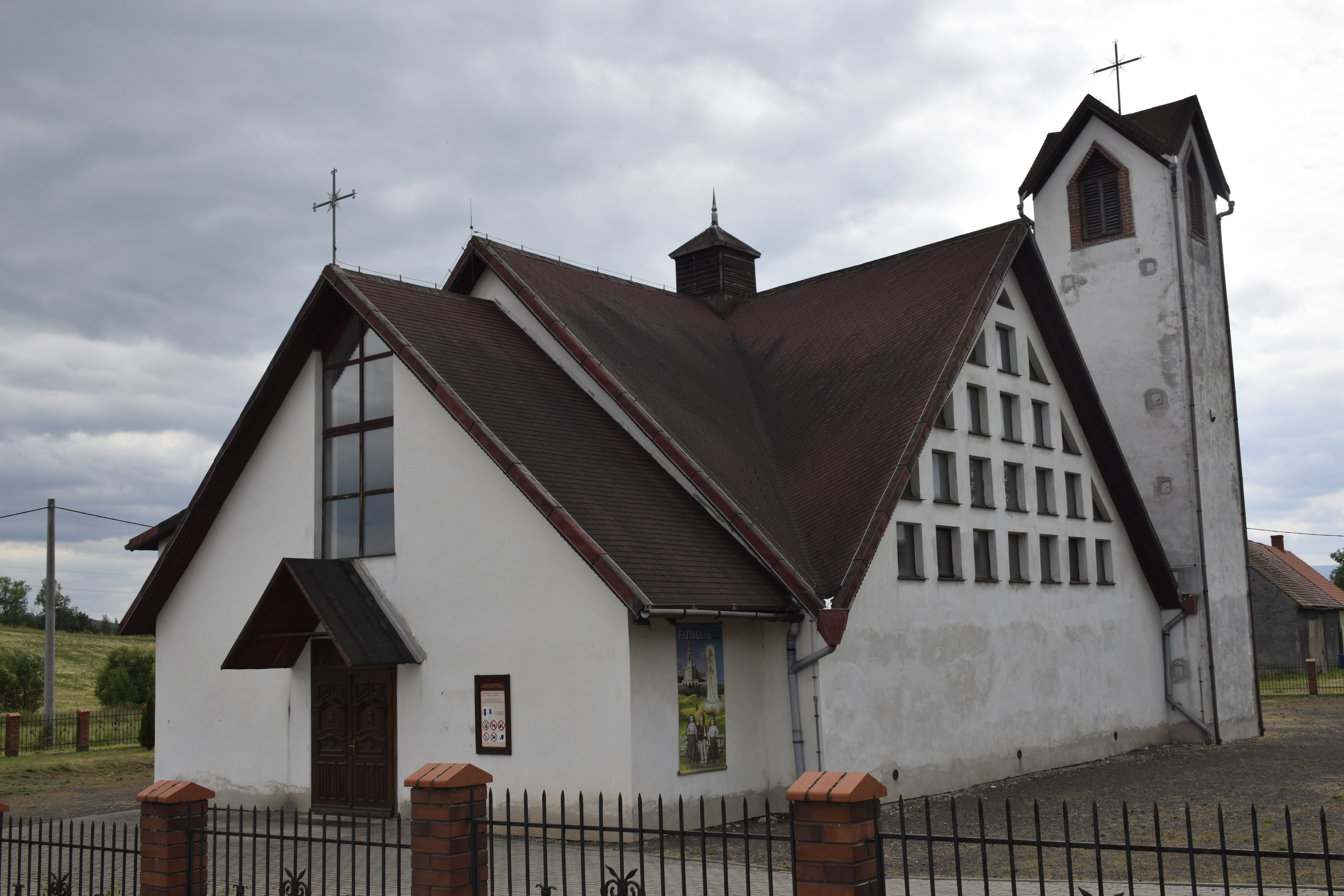
Church

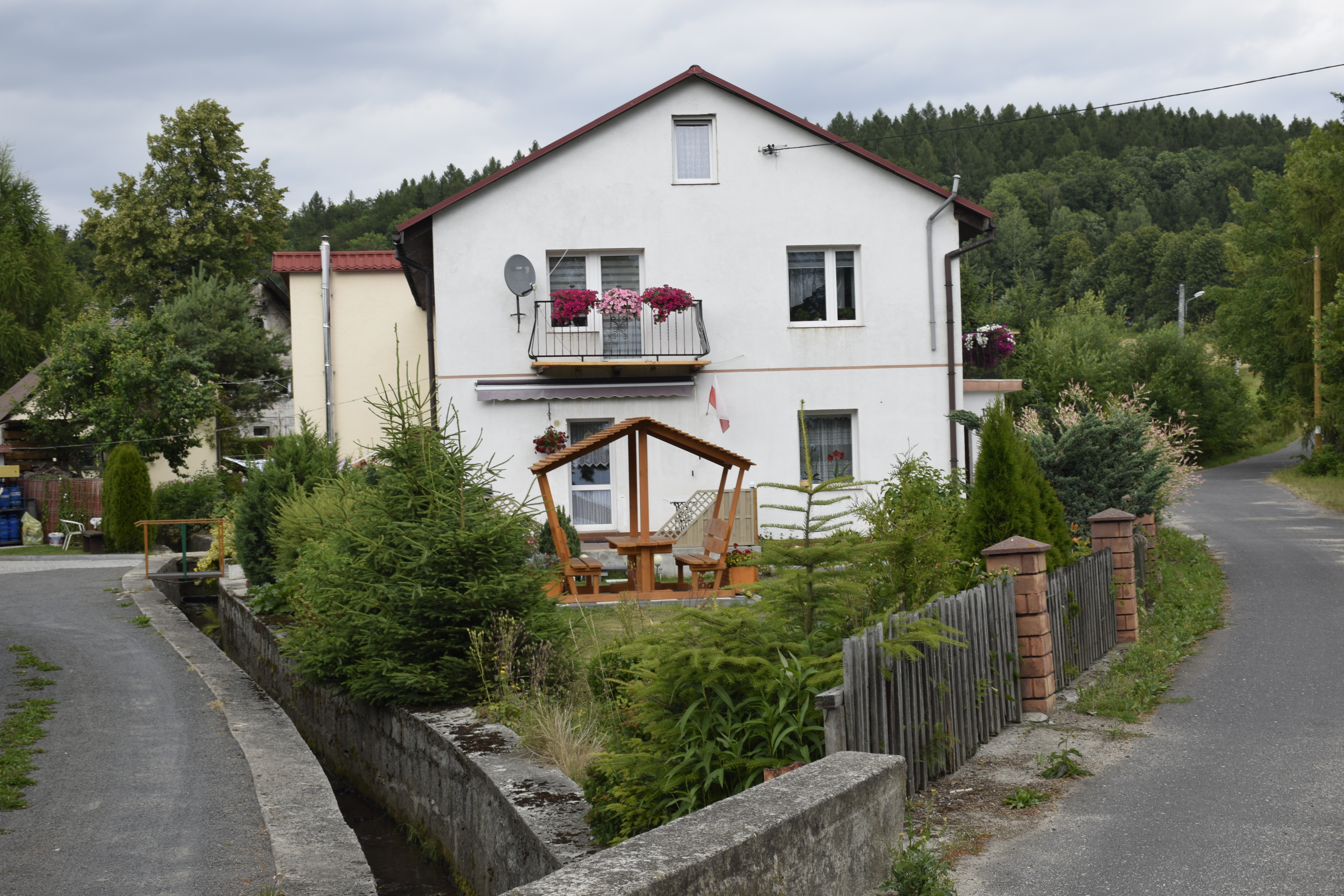
A house
