= Witków Śląski railway station =

Railway station in Witków, Poland

Witków Śląski

General information
- Location: Witków, Lower Silesian Voivodeship; Poland
- Coordinates: 50°47′39.1″N 16°07′39.3″E
- Owner: Polish State Railways
- Line: Wrocław Świebodzki–Zgorzelec railway
- Platforms: 2

History
- Opened: 15 August 1867
- Former names: Wittgendorf (1867–1914); Wittgendorf (Kreis Landeshut Schlesien) (1914–1945); Rothenbach (Schlesien) (1914–1945); Witki (1945–1947)

Services
Preceding station	KD	Following station
Boguszów-Gorce Zachód towards Wrocław Główny	D6	Sędzisław towards Jelenia Góra
Boguszów-Gorce Zachód towards Wrocław Główny	D60	Sędzisław towards Szklarska Poręba Górna
Location
- Location within Poland Location within Lower Silesian Voivodeship

Witków Śląski lit. 'Silesian Witków' (German: Wittgendorf) is a railway station in the village of Witków, Wałbrzych County, within the Lower Silesian Voivodeship in south-western Poland.

== History ==
The station building was built in 1885. The station was opened by Prussian State Railways as Wittgendorf on 15 August 1867, originally part of the historical Silesian Mountain Railway. In 1897 the station was renamed to Wittgendorf (Kreis Landeshut Schlesien) for designation for 1914.

After World War II, the area came under Polish administration. As a result, the station was taken over by Polish State Railways. It was renamed to Witiki in 1945, then its modern name, Witków Śląski, in 1947.

Wooden platform shelters were removed in 2006. In 2012, the station building was renovated. In mid-2013, the line was modernised at the station, including the removal of the main track at the eastern side of the station.

== Train services ==
The station is served by the following services:

- Regional services (KD) Wrocław - Wałbrzych - Jelenia Góra
- Regional services (KD) Wrocław - Wałbrzych - Jelenia Góra - Szklarska Poręba Górna
