= Sobięcin (Wałbrzych) =

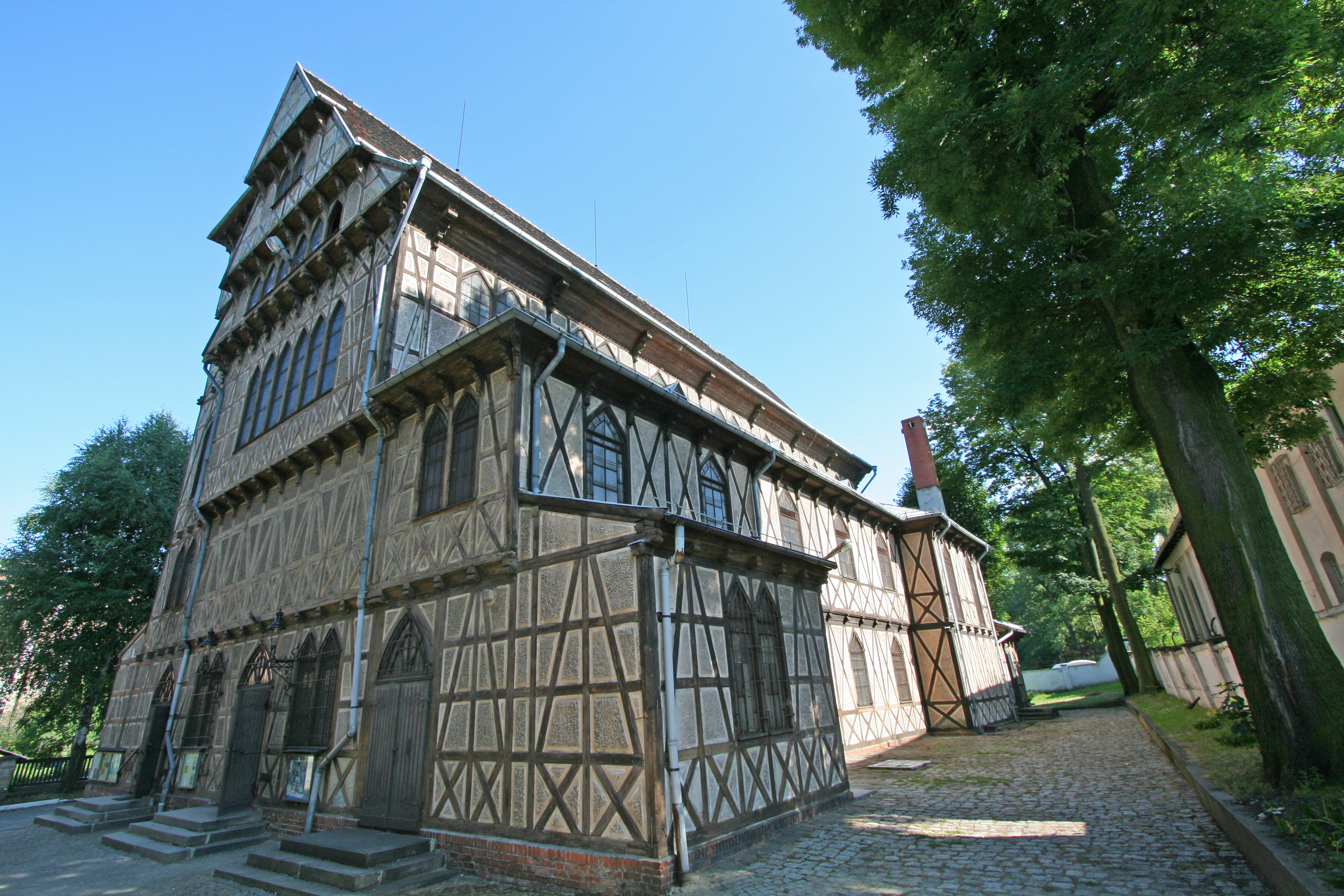
- Saint Joseph church
- Interactive map of Sobięcin
- Coordinates: 50.7602°N 16.2406°E
- Country: Poland
- Voivodeship: Lower Silesian
- County/City: Wałbrzych
- Within city limits: 1951
- Time zone: UTC+1 (CET)
  - Summer (DST): UTC+2 (CEST)
- Vehicle registration: DB

Sobięcin ([sɔˈbjɛnt͡ɕin]; German: Hermsdorf, pronounced [ˈhɛʁmsˌdɔʁf]; until 1929 "Niederhermsdorf", also "Nieder Hermsdorf") is a district of Wałbrzych in the Lower Silesian Voivodeship in Poland, located in the south-western part of the city.

== History ==
In 1892, local mines were merged into one company. It employed 5,557 people as of 1912. In 1898, a tram was established. Some Poles from the Russian and Austrian Partitions of Poland were employed in the settlement since 1894. According to a document from 1907, those Poles were employed as craftsmen, industrial workers, shaft workers, construction workers.

It was included within the city limits of Wałbrzych in 1951.

In 2016, a hoard of 1,385 late medieval coins, Prague groschen of Kings Charles IV and Wenceslaus IV, was found on the border of Wałbrzych and Boguszów-Gorce. The hoard may have been hidden after 1420 during the Hussite Wars. It is one of the largest groschen hoards found in Poland.

== Demographics ==
Historical population
Year	Pop.	±%
1871	5,134	—
1880	6,379	+24.3%
1890	7,660	+20.1%
1900	10,969	+43.2%
1910	11,378	+3.7%
