= Boguszów-Gorce railway station =

Railway station in Boguszów, Boguszów-Gorce, Poland

Boguszów-Gorce
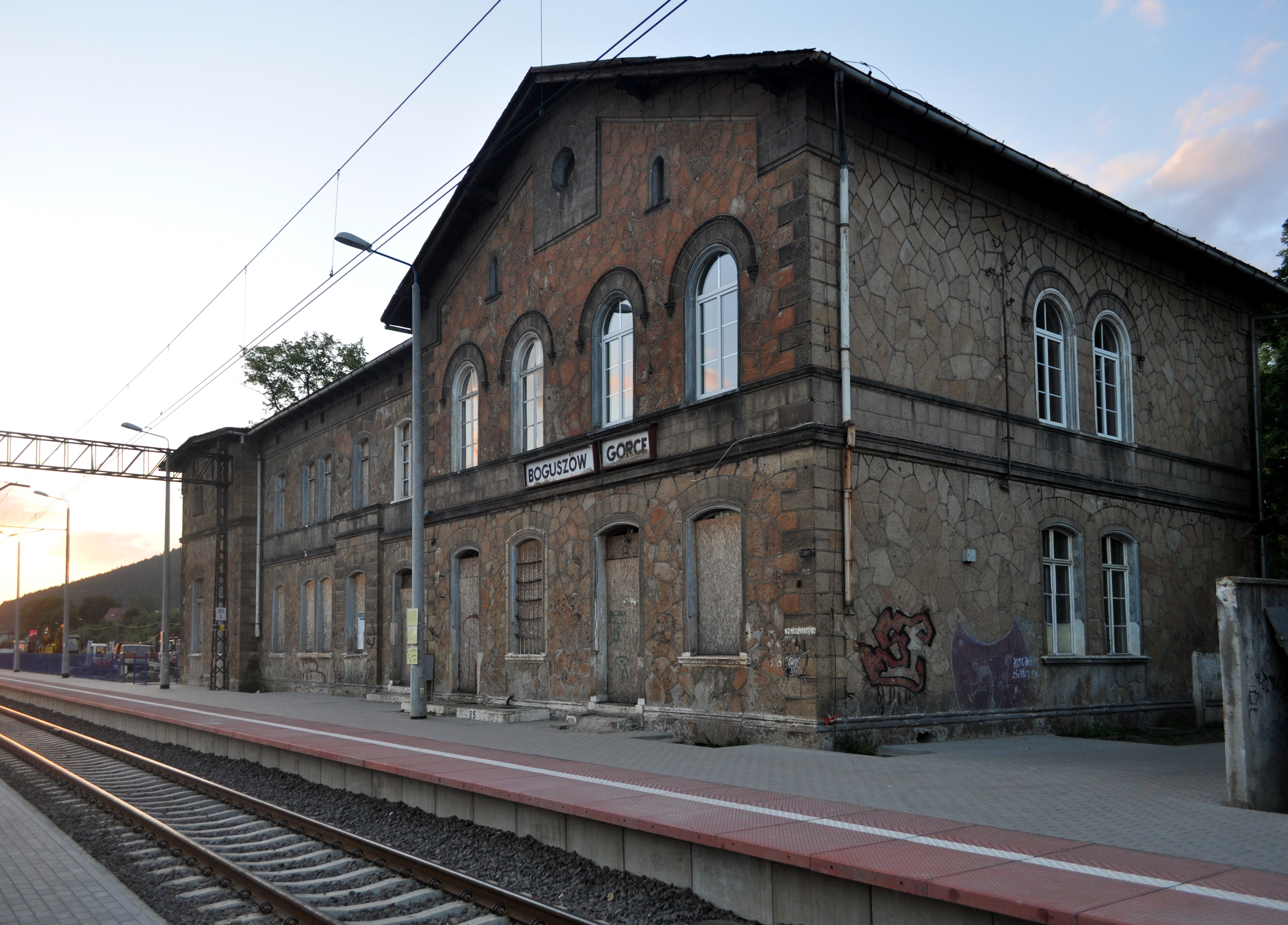
- Station building

General information
- Location: Boguszów, Boguszów-Gorce, Lower Silesian Voivodeship; Poland
- Coordinates: 50°45′01.1″N 16°12′07.2″E
- Owner: Polish State Railways
- Line: Wrocław Świebodzki–Zgorzelec railway
- Platforms: 2

History
- Opened: 15 August 1867
- Former names: Gottesberg (1867–1914); Gottesberg (Schlesien) (1914–1945); Boża Góra (1945–1946); Boguszów Gorce (1974–2016)

Services
Preceding station	KD	Following station
Boguszów-Gorce Wschód towards Wrocław Główny	D6	Boguszów-Gorce Zachód towards Jelenia Góra
Boguszów-Gorce Wschód towards Wrocław Główny	D60	Boguszów-Gorce Zachód towards Szklarska Poręba Górna
Location
- Location within Poland Location within Lower Silesian Voivodeship

Boguszów-Gorce (German: Fellhammer) is a railway station in the Boguszów district of Boguszów-Gorce, Wałbrzych County, within the Lower Silesian Voivodeship in south-western Poland.

== History ==
The station was opened by Prussian State Railways as Gottesberg on 15 August 1867, originally part of the historical Silesian Mountain Railway. In 1914 the station was renamed to Gottesberg (Schlesien).

After World War II, the area came under Polish administration. As a result, the station was taken over by Polish State Railways. It was renamed to Boża Góra in 1945, then Boguszów Gorce in 1946. In 2016 the station was renamed to its modern name, Boguszów-Gorce. The name change only includes a hyphen.

== Train services ==
The station is served by the following services:

- Regional services (KD) Wrocław - Wałbrzych - Jelenia Góra
- Regional services (KD) Wrocław - Wałbrzych - Jelenia Góra - Szklarska Poręba Górna
