= Boguszów-Gorce =

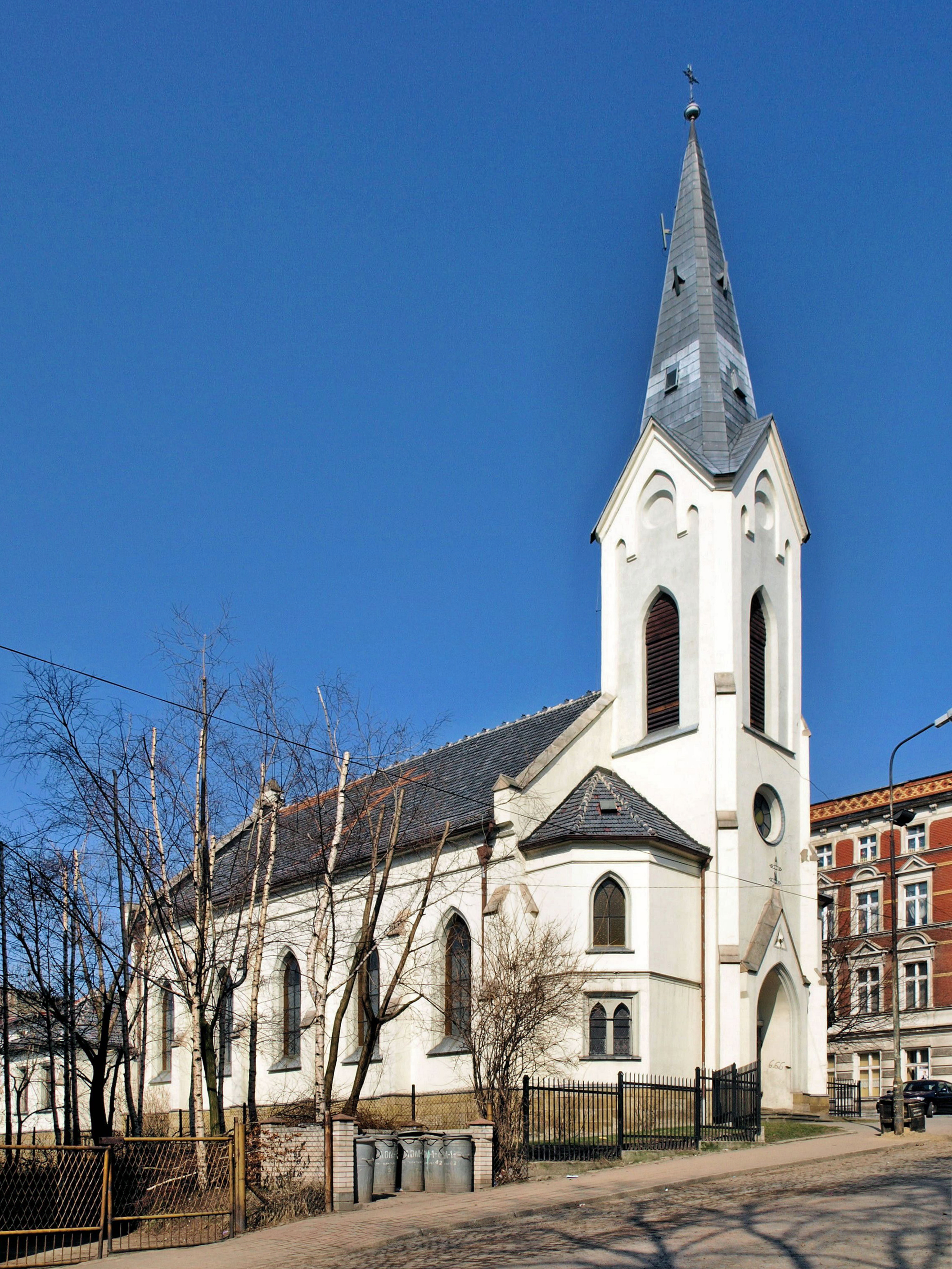
- Polish Catholic Church of Saint Paul

- Flag Coat of arms

- Location within Poland
- Coordinates: 50°46′N 16°12′E
- Country: Poland
- Voivodeship: Lower Silesian
- County: Wałbrzych
- Gmina: Boguszów-Gorce (urban gmina)
- Town rights: 1499 Boguszów; 1962 Gorce; 1973 Boguszów-Gorce

Government
  - Mayor: Daniel Lubiński

Area
  - Total: 27.02 km^{2} (10.43 sq mi)
- Highest elevation: 750 m (2,460 ft)
- Lowest elevation: 520 m (1,710 ft)

Population (30 June 2021)
  - Total: 15,085
  - Density: 558.3/km^{2} (1,446/sq mi)
- Time zone: UTC+1 (CET)
  - Summer (DST): UTC+2 (CEST)
- Postal code: 58-370 to 58-371
- Area code: +48 74
- Car plates: DBA
- Website: https://boguszow-gorce.pl

Boguszów-Gorce ([bɔˈɡuʂuf ˈɡɔrt͡sɛ]) is a town in Wałbrzych County, Lower Silesian Voivodeship, in south-western Poland. As of June 2021, it has a population of 15,085.

== Geography ==
It lies on the border between the Wałbrzych Mountains and the Stone Mountains in the Central Sudetes.

== History ==
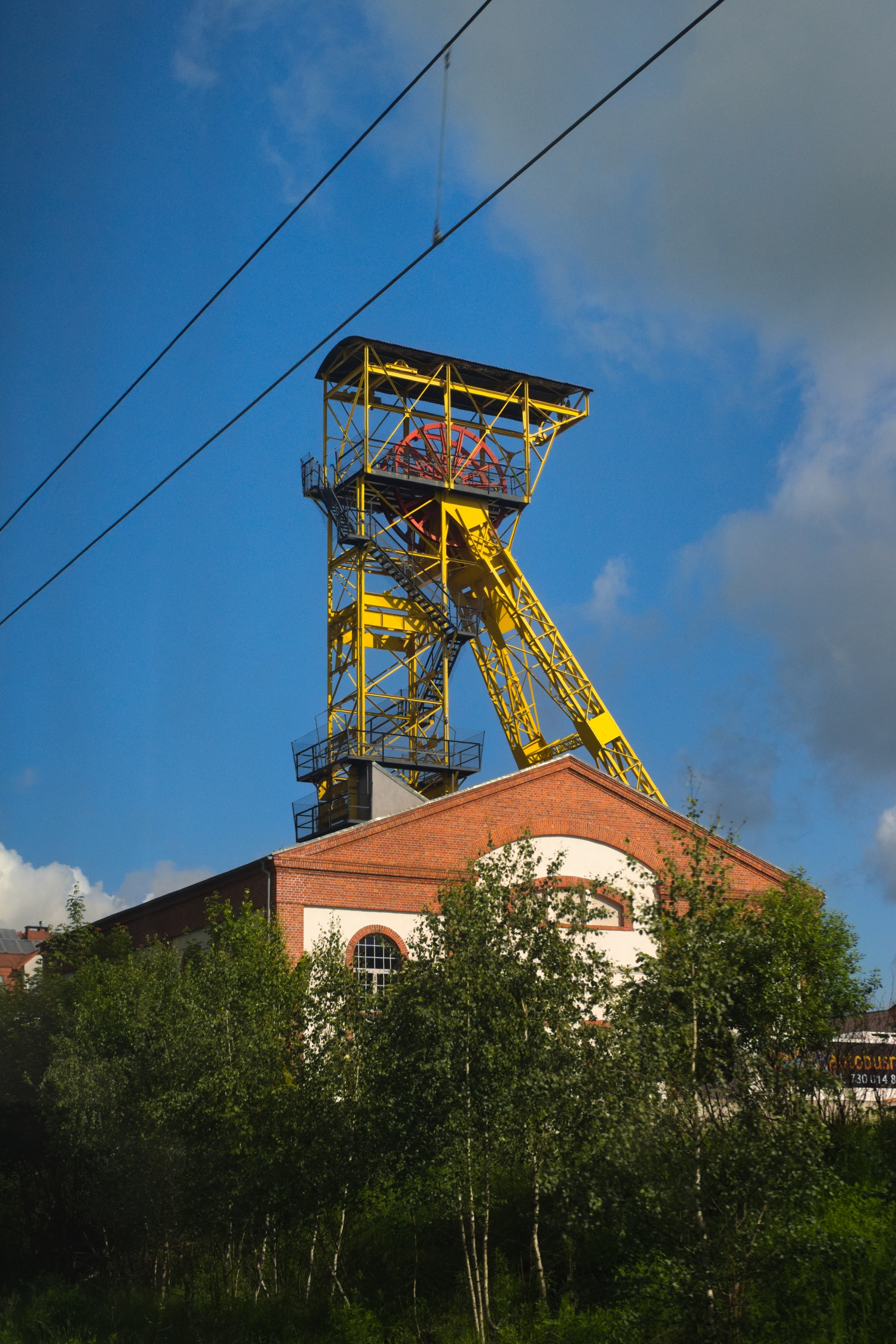
Witold shaft

Boguszów was granted town rights by King Vladislaus II in 1499. It was a mining town, and in 1502 Vladislaus II relinquished to the town a quarter of the tithe owed to him from the town's silver mines. In the 16th century, the town became the most important lead and silver ore mining center in the Sudeten part of Silesia, but by the end of the 16th century much of the deposits had been exploited, and then eventually local mining collapsed during the Thirty Years' War. Local mines supplied silver to the mints in Wrocław and Złoty Stok. A new mining company was founded in 1701, which, however, did not revive local mining. In the late 18th century, bituminous coal and baryte mining began on a larger scale.

During World War I, the Germans operated a forced labour camp for Allied prisoners of war in the town. During World War II, the Germans operated a forced labour subcamp of the Stalag VIII-A prisoner-of-war camp at a coal mine in Kuźnice Świdnickie.

In the interwar period and the 1950s, the villages of Sobięcin Górny, Koło, Lubominek and Stary Lesieniec were included within the town limits of Boguszów. In 1962, Gorce was granted town rights. Boguszów-Gorce was established in 1973 from the merger of the towns of Boguszów and Gorce and the village of Kuźnice Świdnickie.

In 2016, a hoard of 1,385 late medieval coins, Prague groschen of Kings Charles IV and Wenceslaus IV, was found on the border of Boguszów-Gorce and Wałbrzych. The hoard may have been hidden after 1420 during the Hussite Wars. It is one of the largest groschen hoards found in Poland.

== Transport ==
The following railway stations are located in the town and serve individual districts:

- Boguszów-Gorce Wschód
- Boguszów-Gorce
- Boguszów-Gorce Zachód

== Notable people ==
Soviet and Russian singer (Polish of origin) Edita Piekha lived here from 1946-1955 with mother, stepfather and brother.

== Twin towns – sister cities ==
Boguszów-Gorce is twinned with:

- Smiřice, Czech Republic

== Bibliography ==
- Paszkiewicz, Borys, ed. (2020). Skarb groszy praskich z XIV i XV wieku z Boguszowa (tak zwany skarb wałbrzyski) (in Polish and English). Wrocław: Uniwersytet Wrocławski. ISBN 978-83-61416-58-6.
