= Plater =

Plater is a surname, and may refer to:

- Felix Plater (1536–1614), Swiss physician
- George Plater (1735–1792), American lawyer and politician
- Thomas Plater (1769–1830), American lawyer and politician
- Emilia Plater (1806–1831), Polish–Lithuanian noble and revolutionary
- Władysław Plater (1808–1889), Polish–Lithuanian count
- Jurgis Pliateris (1810–1836), Polish–Lithuanian noble and bibliographer
- Maria Broel-Plater (1845-1895), Polish composer
- Cecylia Plater-Zyberk (1853–1920), Polish social activist and educationalist
- Kazimierz Plater (1915–2004), Polish chess master
- Alan Plater (1935–2010), English playwright and screenwriter
- Bobby Plater (1914–1982), American jazz alto saxophonist
- Elizabeth Plater-Zyberk (1950–), American architect
- Steve Plater (1968–), English motorcycle racer
- Matthew Plater (1995-), English cricketer

Other

- Plater College, established in 1922 in Headington, Oxford
- Duany Plater Zyberk & Company, American architecture firm
- Plater coat of arms
- Plater, German and Polish noble family

== See also ==
- Platers (disambiguation)
- Platter (disambiguation)
