= Emilia Plater Independent Women's Battalion =

Soviet unit composed of Poles (1943–45)

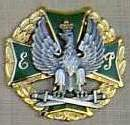
- Active: 1943–May 1945
- Country: Poland
- Allegiance: Soviet Union
- Branch: Land forces
- Type: Infantry
- Size: 690 women
- Patron: Emilia Plater
- Engagements: World War II

The Emilia Plater Independent Women's Battalion (Polish: Samodzielny Batalion Kobiecy im. Emilii Plater) was a unit of the Soviet First Polish Army during the Second World War. It was created in 1943 with the intention of serving as a front-line fighting unit, but it was mostly used for police and sentry work. It existed until May 1945, when the war came to a close, at which point it had 500 members.

== Formation ==
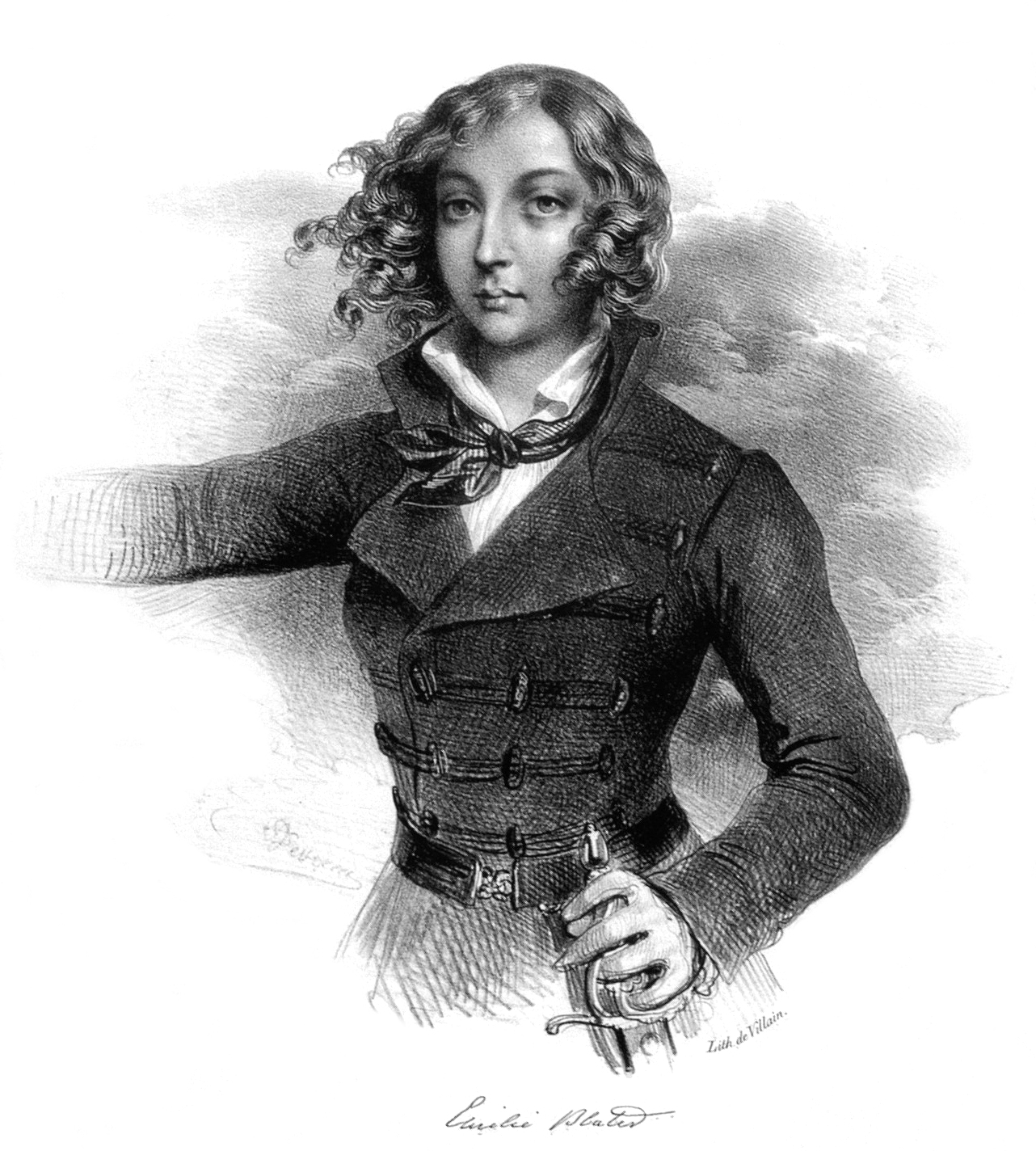
Emilia Plater for whom the unit was named

The unit was formed on 15 July 1943 as an all-female unit of the Soviet Polish Army. Its personnel were drawn from women deported from Soviet-occupied Poland and communist volunteers. There was no shortage of volunteers from among the internees, many of whom were eager to escape the poor conditions of their imprisonment. This was the first all-female Polish unit and had originally been opposed by the Soviet authorities who only relented when General Anders pointed out the widespread use of women in the Soviet Army. The battalion was named after Emilia Plater, a female Polish-Lithuanian leader who had fought against the Russians in the 1830 November Uprising. The individual soldiers were nicknamed the Platerówki. The commanders of the unit were men but its political officers were women.

== History ==
The unit numbered 690 women when it was formed. It originally formed part of the Polish 1st Tadeusz Kościuszko Infantry Division but from 19 August 1943 was transferred to the I Polish Corps (this formation became the First Polish Army on 17 July 1944). It was intended to be used as a front-line combat unit but issues with training and possibly a reluctance by its commanders to risk large-scale female combat losses meant that it was relegated largely to sentry and military police duty. It also carried out medical and communications duties and provided training to women working elsewhere in the Polish Army. Some women officers of the battalion commanded all-male combat platoons within other formations. At the war's end in May 1945 the battalion comprised around 500 women, with 70 having been killed in service.

The only woman ever decorated with the Gold Star of the Hero of the Soviet Union who was not a Soviet citizen is Aniela Krzywoń, a member of this unit, after she died of injuries sustained while rescuing important military documents from a burning truck after a Luftwaffe bombing raid.

Following the shift of Poland's borders to the west, 130 female soldiers of the unit have been settled in Platerówka, formerly Nieder Linde, and other villages of Gmina Platerówka, where they took active part in life of the settlements.

Women veterans of the unit successfully sued Polish journalist and author Henryk Piecuch for slander in the 1990s after he claimed the battalion was organised solely to provide sexual services to male officers.

== Organisation ==
Upon its formation the battalion comprised:

- Command unit
- Five companies
  - 1st Infantry
  - 2nd Infantry
  - Fusilier
  - Machine gun
  - Anti-tank
- Six platoons
  - Mortar
  - Reconnaissance
  - Signals
  - Medical
  - Engineer
  - Logistics
  - Transport (added late in 1943)
