= Zalipie =

Zalipie may refer to the following villages in Poland:

- Zalipie in Lubań County, Lower Silesian Voivodeship (SW Poland)
- Zalipie, Lesser Poland Voivodeship (S Poland)
