= Barbara Bronisława Czarnowska =

Polish noblewoman and independence fighter (1810–1891)

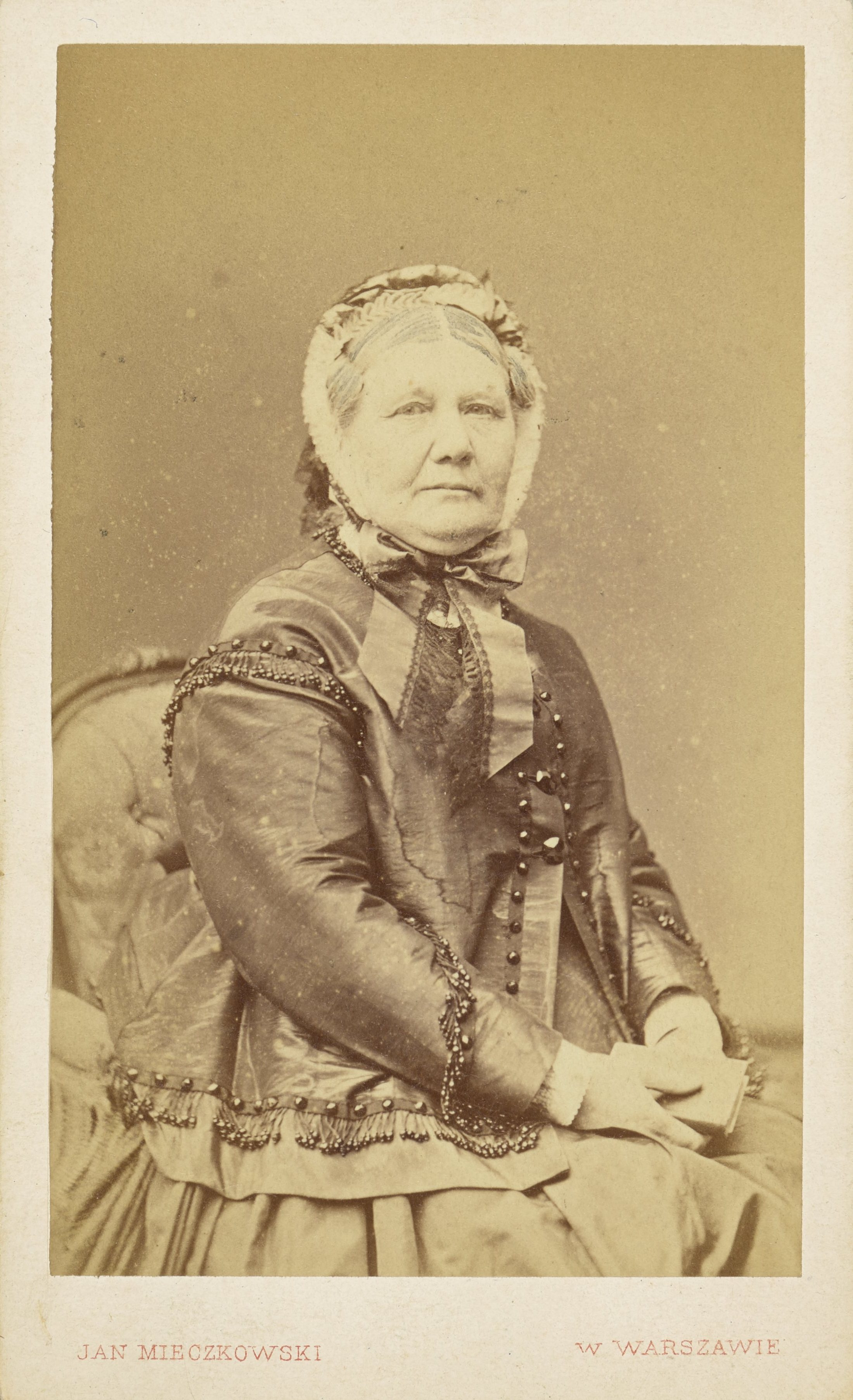
- Portrait of Czarnowska taken around 1875 by Jan Mieczkowski
- Born: 4 December 1810; Strugi, Duchy of Warsaw, First French Empire
- Died: 23 October 1891 (aged 80); Warsaw, Congress Poland
- Burial place: Powązki Cemetery, Warsaw, Congress Poland
- Spouse(s): Kazimierz Zakrzewski (m. 1836, d. 1841); Stanisław Żbikowski
- Military career
- Allegiance: Poland
- Rank: Cadet
- Unit: 1st Augustów Cavalry Regiment
- Known for: Disguising herself as a man to fight in the November Uprising
- Conflicts: Battle of Warsaw (1831)
- Awards: Virtuti Militari; Star of Perseverance

Barbara Bronisława Czarnowska (4 December 1810 – 23 October 1891) was a Polish noblewoman, independence fighter and soldier. She disguised herself as a man to serve as a cadet in the Polish Army and was decorated with the Silver Cross of the Virtuti Militari.

== Biography ==
Czarnowska was born on 4 December 1810 in the village of Strugi, near Warsaw (then in the Duchy of Warsaw, First French Empire). She was from a noble but impoverished family who leased a small farm. Her father was Klemens Czarnowski and her mother was Ewa Czarnowska (née Stokowska).

After the outbreak of the November Uprising between Imperial Russia and Congress Poland, Czarnowska nursed wounded soldiers in Warsaw.

On 18 April 1831, she disguised herself as a man to serve as a cadet in the Polish Army, enlisting with the 1st Augustów Cavalry Regiment [pl] (Polish: 1 Pułk Jazdy Augustowskiej) at a military camp in Praga. She had dressed in a military uniform and cut her long hair after her first attempt to enlist was refused.

On 6 and 7 September 1831, Czarnowska fought at the Battle of Warsaw. Her regiment formed a battle line between the Jerusalem and Wola tollgates. Following a cavalry clash, she was found under her beaten mount and was pulled from under the injured horse by fellow soldiers.

Czarnowska was decorated with the Silver Cross of the Virtuti Militari. She was the third woman in Polish history to be honoured with this distinction. She was also awarded the Star of Perseverance (Polish: Zacroczymska).

In 1836, Czarnowska married widower Kazimierz Zakrzewski, the owner of an estate in the village of Żaby pod Błonie. He died in 1841 and she remarried to Stanisław Żbikowski. She lived with her second husband in Warsaw, where she became known as “Miss Lieutenant,” raised her children and engaged in charitable works.

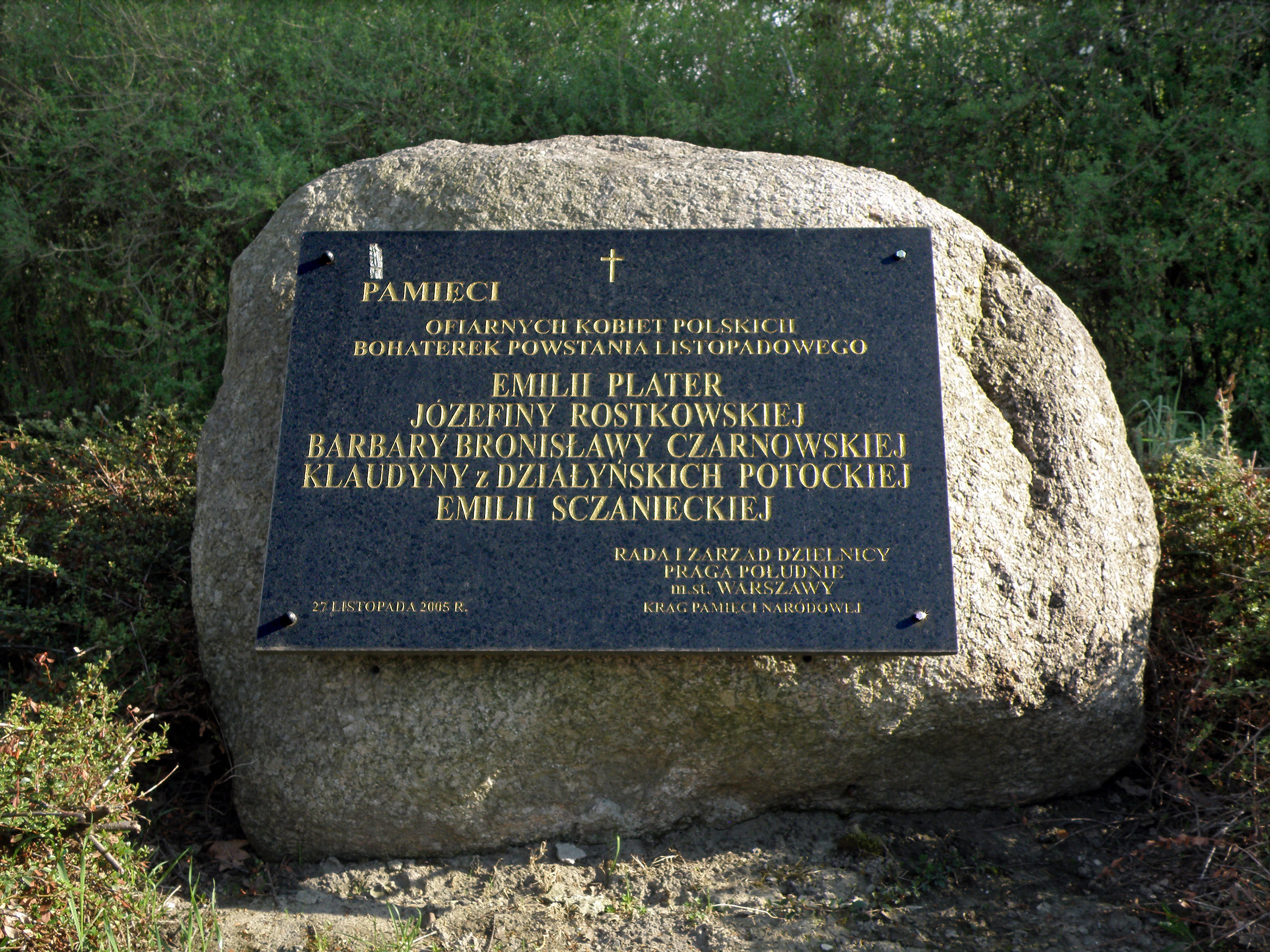
Memory boulder commemorating heroines of the November Uprising: Czarnowska, Emily Plater and Józefa Rostkowska

Czarnowska died on 23 October 1891 in Warsaw, aged 80. Her funeral was held at St. John's Archcathedral, Warsaw, and she was buried at Powązki Cemetery in Warsaw (plot 29, row 3).

A biography of Czarnowska's life was published in 1902 by Michał Eustachy Brensztejn. Czarnowska is commemorated alongside Emily Plater and Józefa Rostkowska on a boulder plaque to the heroines of the November Uprising. She was also included on a plaque in memory of the "November Insurgents" which was unveiled on Piastowska Street in Sierpc on 27 November 2010. In 2010, a primary school was named in her honour.

Czarnowska's great-granddaughter became a democracy activist and leader in the National Organization for Women.
