= Polish Museum, Rapperswil =

Historical museum in Switzerland

Coordinates: 47.226667°N 8.818333°E

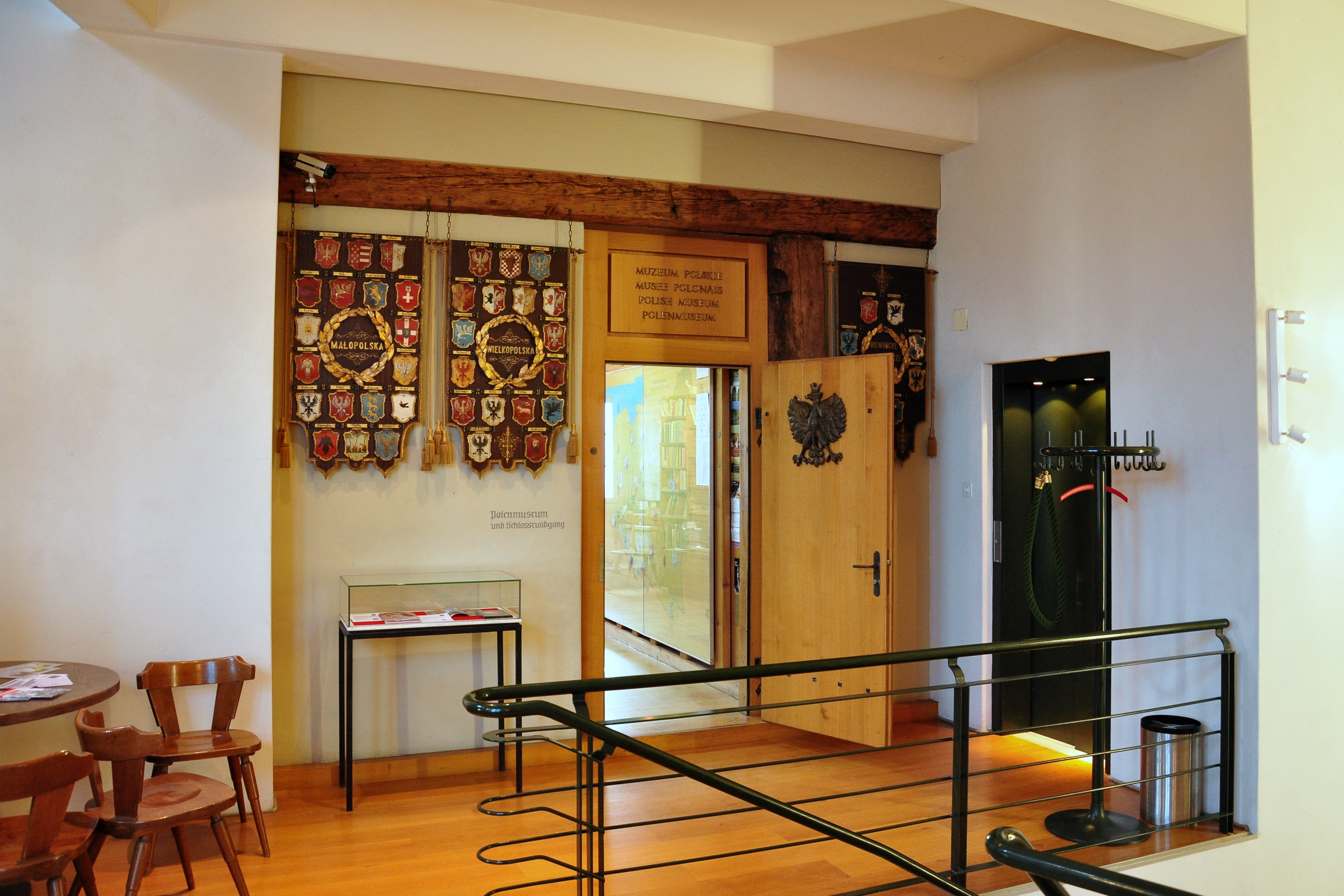
Muzeum Polskie at Schloss (Castle) Rapperswil, Switzerland

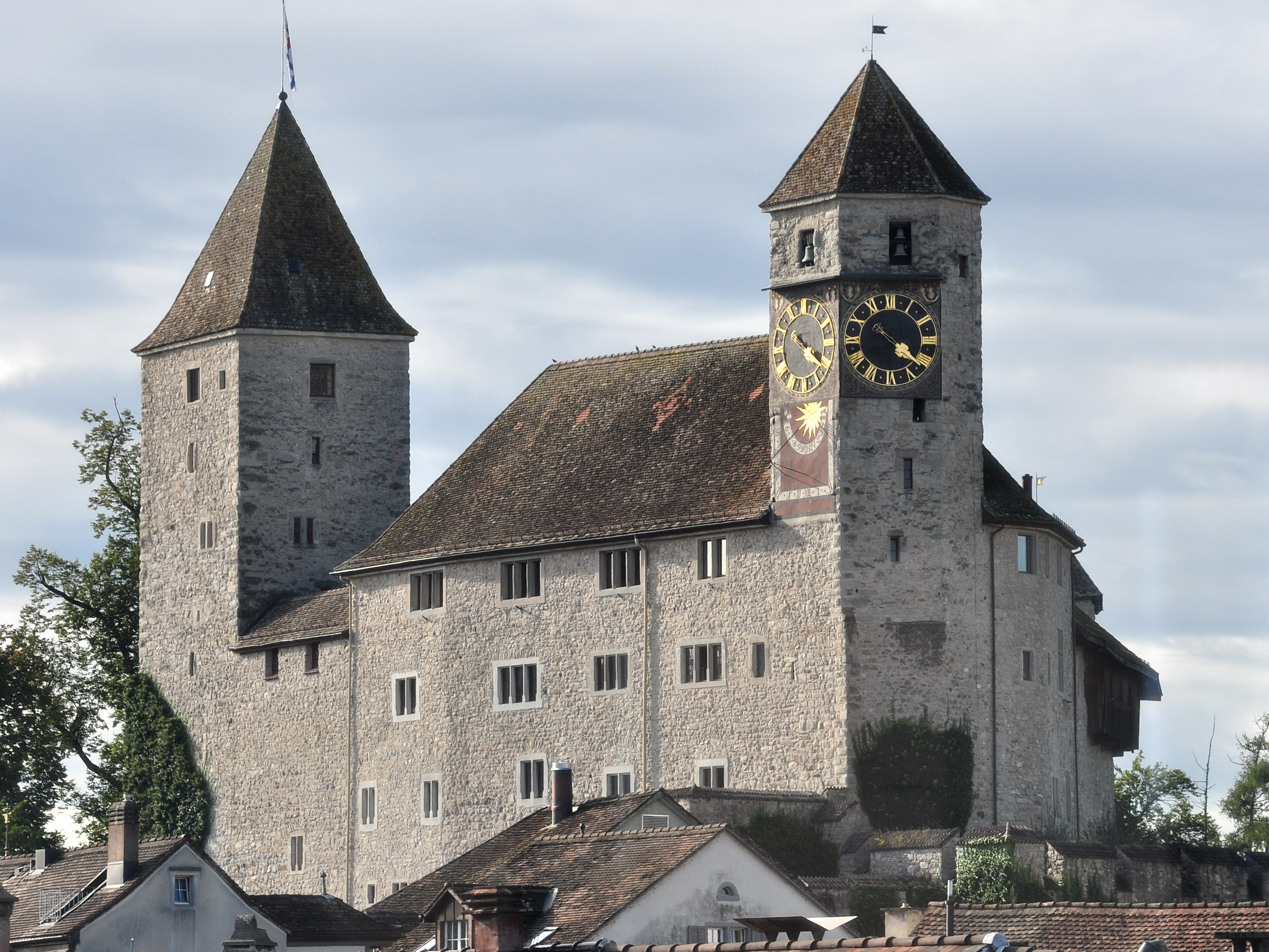
Castle seen from Neue Jonastrasse

The Polish Museum, Rapperswil, was founded in Rapperswil, Switzerland, on 23 October 1870, by Polish Count Władysław Broel-Plater, at the urging of Agaton Giller, as "a refuge for Poland's historic memorabilia dishonored and plundered in the [occupied Polish] homeland" and for the promotion of Polish interests.

Except for two hiatuses (1927–36, 1952–75), the Museum has existed to the present day—an outpost of Polish culture in Switzerland, a country which, over the past two centuries, has given refuge to generations of Poles.

== Founding ==
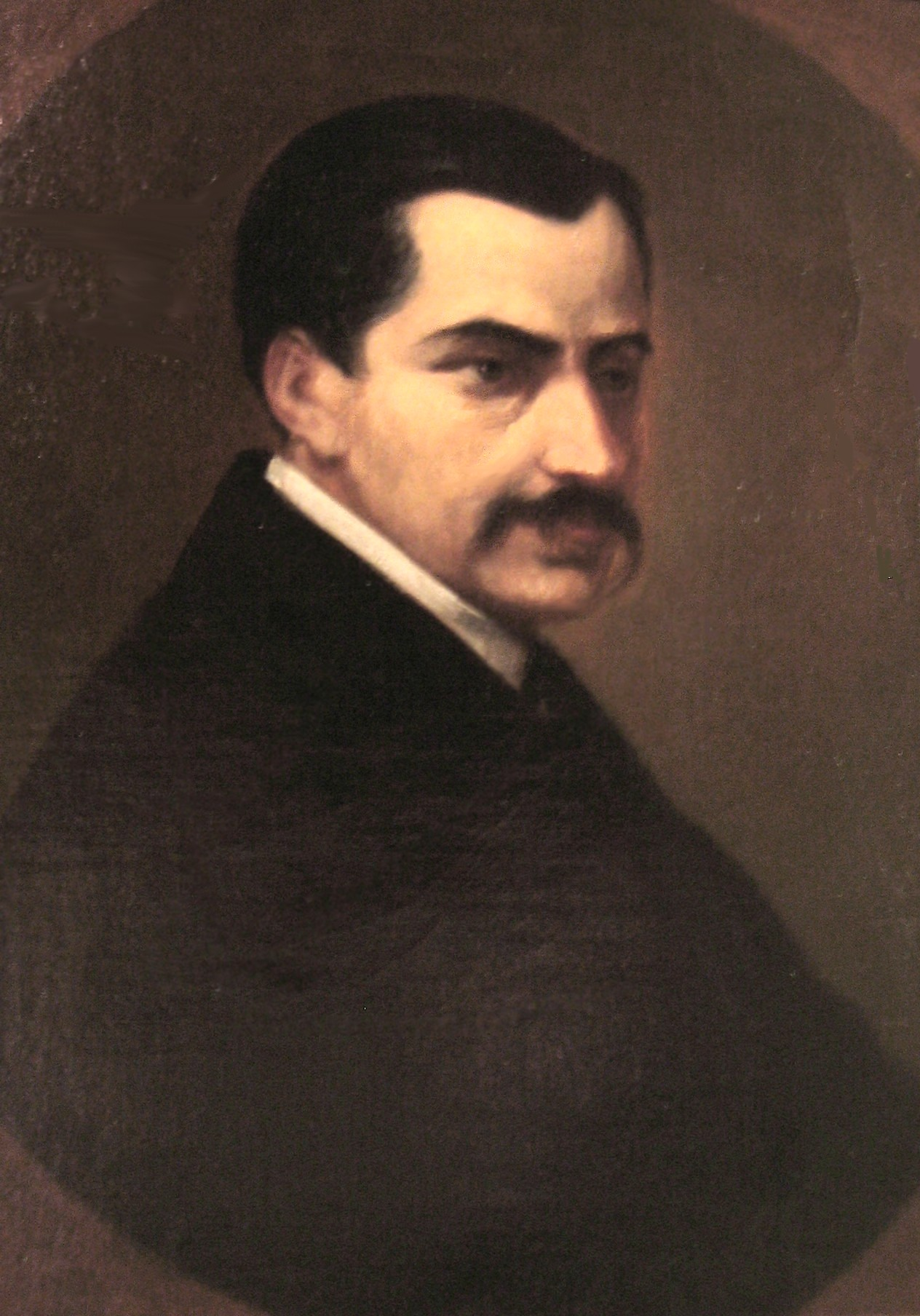
Agaton Giller

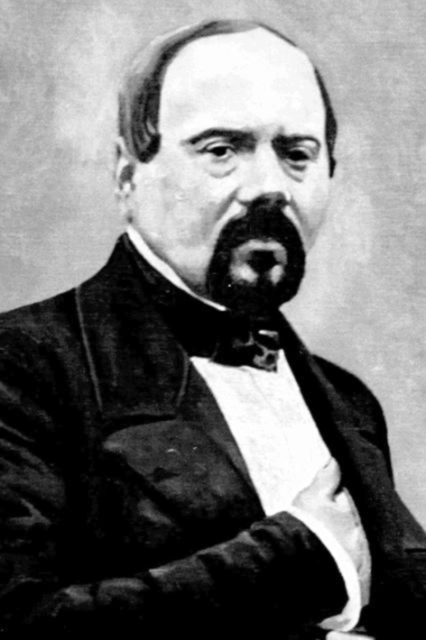
Władysław Plater

The Polish Museum is housed in the Rapperswil Castle, atop that town's Herrenberg. Erected in the 12th century by Count Rudolf of Rapperswil, the castle passed, together with the town, into the hands of the Habsburgs. Rapperswil became a free city (Freie Reichsstadt) in 1415, and eventually joined the Swiss Confederation. Over the course of time, the castle fell into disrepair.

In the second half of the 19th century, the castle was leased for 99 years from the local authorities by a post-November 1830 Uprising Polish émigré, Count Władysław Broel-Plater (a relative of Emilia Plater, a heroine of the same 1830 Uprising), who had been in Switzerland since 1844. At his own expense he restored the castle, and on 23 October 1870, opened there the Polish National Museum.

== Żeromski and Prus ==
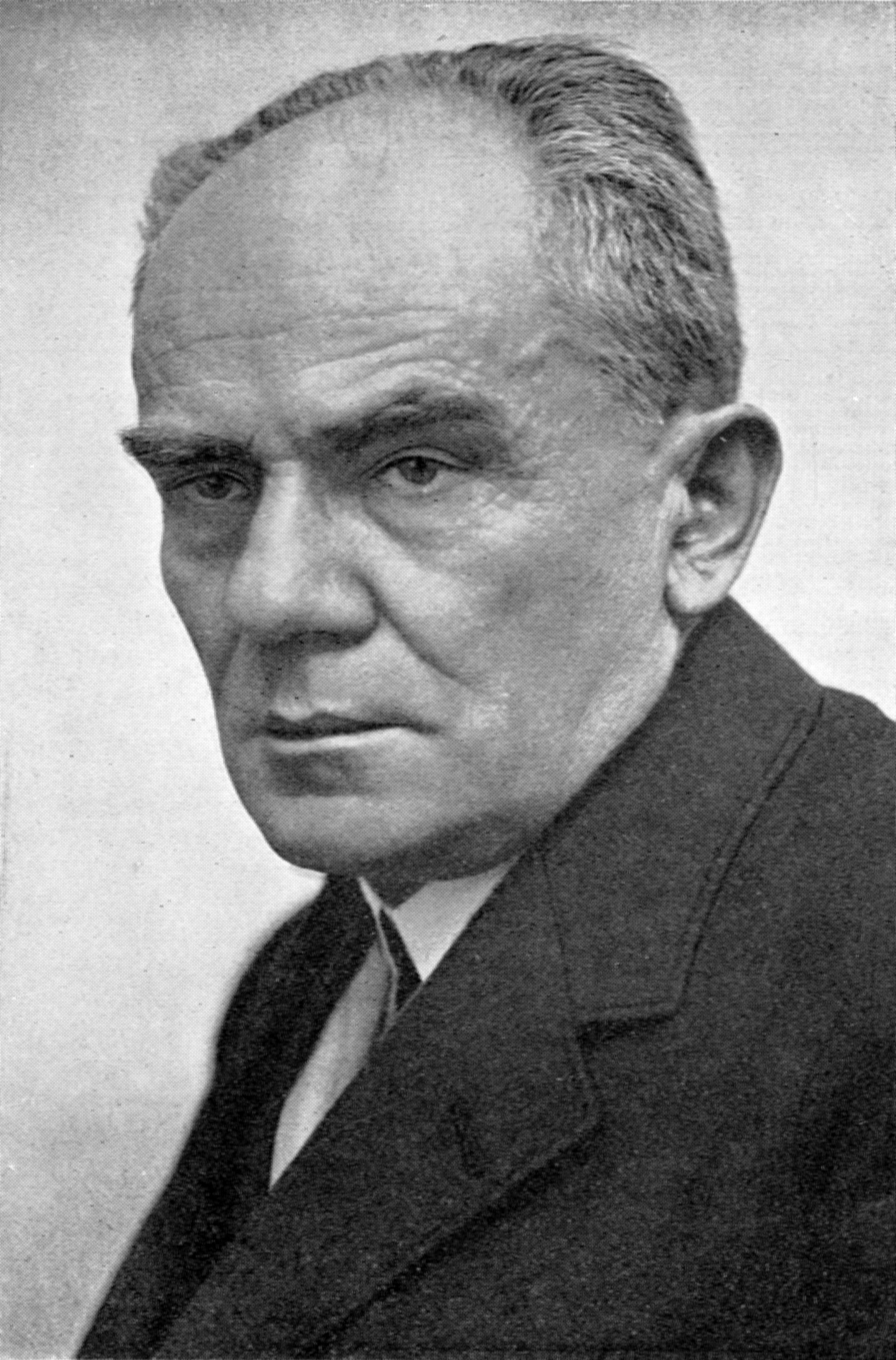
Stefan Żeromski

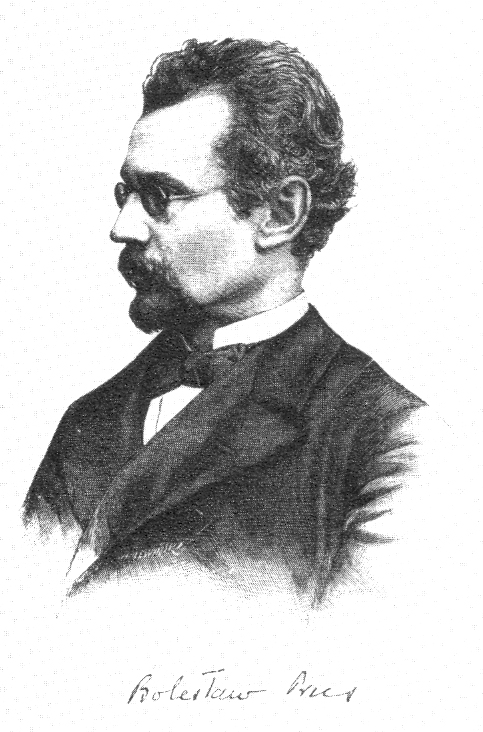
Bolesław Prus

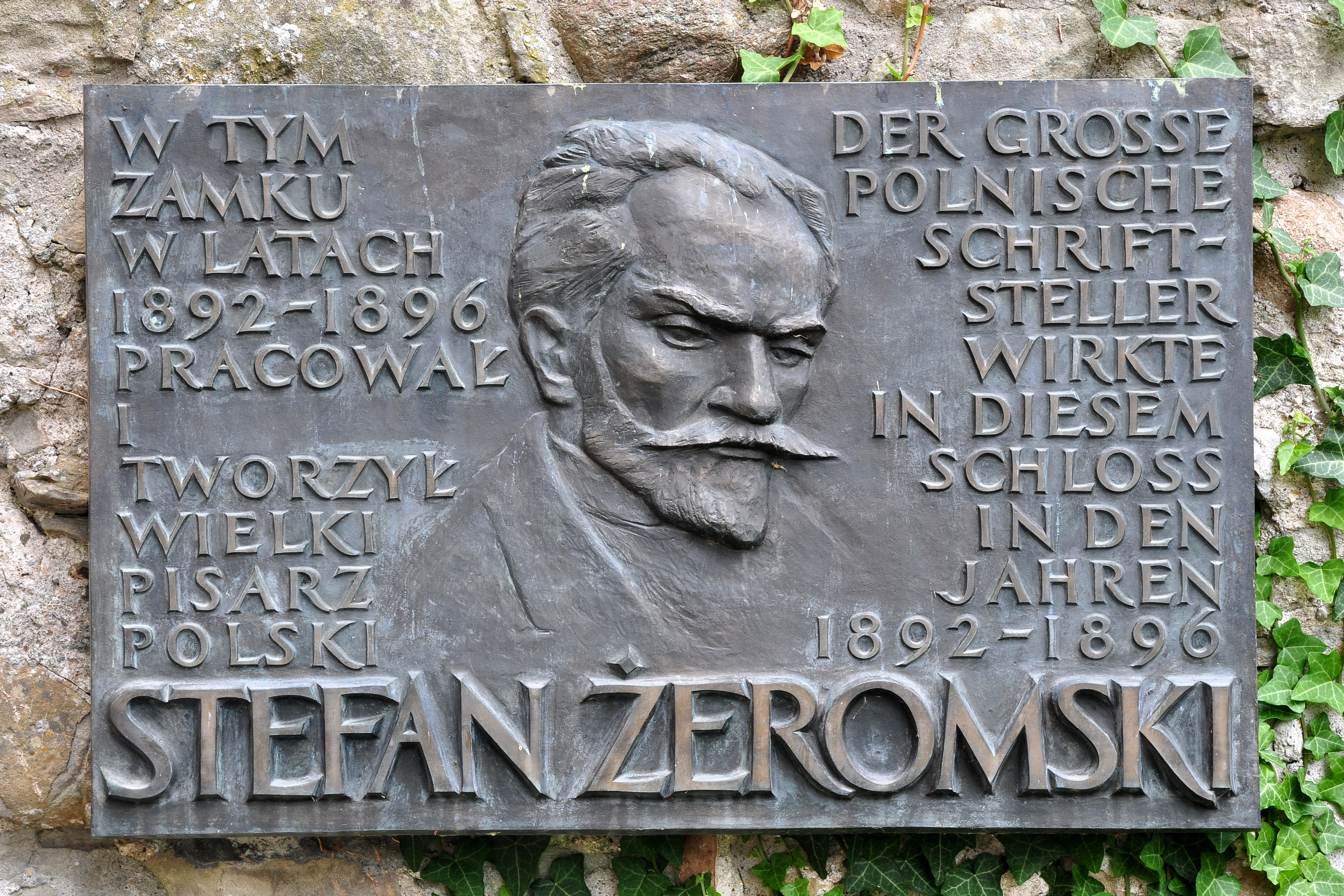
Plaque at Castle, commemorating Stefan Żeromski's archival and literary work there, 1892-96

Beginning in 1892, the Museum employed one or more librarians. The second to be hired, who worked there four years (1892–96), was future Polish novelist Stefan Żeromski, who had obtained the post thanks in part to a letter of recommendation from novelist Bolesław Prus. Prus had also stood as witness at Żeromski's 1892 wedding to Oktawia Rodkiewicz.

The Żeromskis and Oktawia's daughter by a previous marriage, Henryka ("Henia"), lived in Rapperswil, in the garret of a three-story house at Bahnhofstrasse 28, owned by a Frau Fäh. When Prus visited them for two months in July–August 1895, Oktawia Żeromska rented a room for him on the building's second floor. Thus, for a time, two of Poland's greatest novelists lived at this one address in Rapperswil, Switzerland.

On 2 July 1895, Prus wrote his wife, describing his first impression of the town: "Rapperswil is a village, but built of brick like our cities, and has at nearly every house a little garden, like our [Warsaw] Botanical [Garden] in terms of the plants. Everything here is bathed in roses..."

Prus admired the honesty, industry and kindliness of the populace.

Standing just before the entrance to the castle is the Bar Column, designed by Zürich University Professor Julian Stadler. It had been erected by Count Plater, largely at his own expense, in 1868 (two years before the museum's opening) on the 100th anniversary of the founding of the Bar Confederation, to commemorate Poland's then-century-long struggle for independence. The column had originally been placed at the shore of Lake Zürich but Russian protests had led to its move up to the castle, where it would not be visible from the town. The column is topped by an eagle, while the base bears, among other things, the Latin inscription, "Magna res libertas" ("A great thing is liberty") and the Polish–Lithuanian Commonwealth coat-of-arms featuring the Polish Eagle and the Lithuanian Vytis (in Polish, Pogoń).

Librarian Stefan Żeromski clashed with the Museum's curator at the time, Rużycki de Rozenwerth, a loner and eccentric whom the novelist would immortalize in his novel Homeless People as the administrator of Cisy (The Yews), Krzywosąd.

Month after month, Żeromski had moved printed matter from storage onto the newly placed bookshelves in the chilly second-floor library in the castle. Zygmunt Wasilewski, the Museum's first-hired librarian (1892), who worked there for a year or two with Żeromski (with whom he had attended school in Kielce), later recalled:

"We waded through memoirs, émigré brochures, ephemeral periodicals. And there was plenty of it all, sometimes in triplicate, for the collections had arisen from a pooling of libraries left by the more prosperous 1831 émigrés (Władysław Plater, Krystyn Ostrowski, L[eonard] Chodźko, etc.), neatly bound and collected."

The library and archives, however, soon acquired an importance greater than the rest of the Museum. The library was built on the collections of Leonard Chodźko, one-time aide-de-camp to General La Fayette, purchased by the Museum in 1874. After Chodźko's death, the library acquired the archives of émigré organisations and committees, the papers of institutions and associations from the period of the Great Emigration, as well as contemporary printed matter, engravings and maps.

In 1883 the library received Count Plater's archives, valuable sources relating to the January 1863 Uprising and Polish post-Uprising immigrants to Switzerland. The library also obtained Artur Wołyński's collections on the January 1863 Uprising. Henryk Bukowski augmented the collections of manuscripts pertaining to Tadeusz Kościuszko (who had died in 1817 at Solothurn, Switzerland).

The library received bequests from individuals in Europe and America, as well as archives of families and organisations residing in various countries. Over the 57 years until 1927, the library also gathered Polish publications that appeared outside Poland, and non-Polish publications pertaining to Poland.

During World War I, the library's collections provided material for Polish propaganda published in French, German and English. At the turn of the 20th century, the Polish Museum's library was the largest Polish library outside Poland.

== Repatriation ==
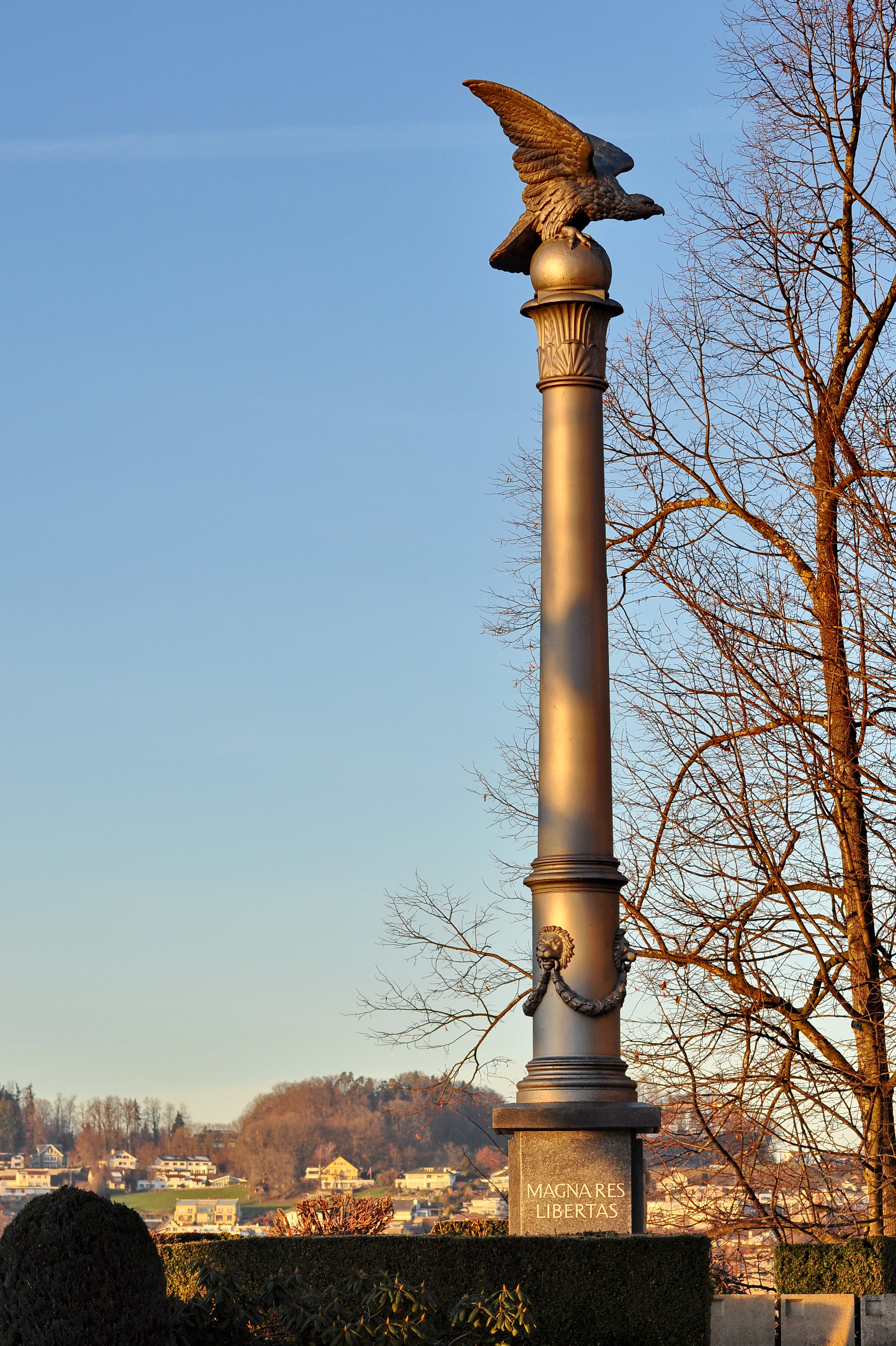
Liberty column before Rapperswil Castle

The Museum's founder, Count Plater, had bequeathed the collections to the Polish people. In 1927, after Poland had regained independence following World War I, pursuant to Plater's wishes the Museum collections were transported to Poland in fourteen railroad cars: 1,400 maps and atlases, 10,000 photographs, 1,000 musical scores, 91,000 books (including brochures and periodicals), and 27,000 manuscripts.

The greater part of these collections, especially the library and archives, were deliberately destroyed by the Germans in Warsaw during World War II.

A notable object that survived was Tadeusz Kościuszko's heart, which now reposes in a chapel at Warsaw's Royal Castle, rebuilt in the 1970s from its deliberate destruction in World War II.

== Contemporary Poland ==
In 1936 a Museum of Contemporary Poland was established at the Rapperswil Castle, to popularize the art and achievements of independent Poland.

In 1940, after some 13,000 Polish Army soldiers who had fought in France were interned in Switzerland, the Museum supervised educational and cultural work at the internment camps.

In 1945, at the conclusion of World War II, the Museum was taken over by the Polish People's Republic. In 1952 Rapperswil's local government, fearing that the Castle would become a center for communist propaganda, closed the Museum.

== Museum today ==
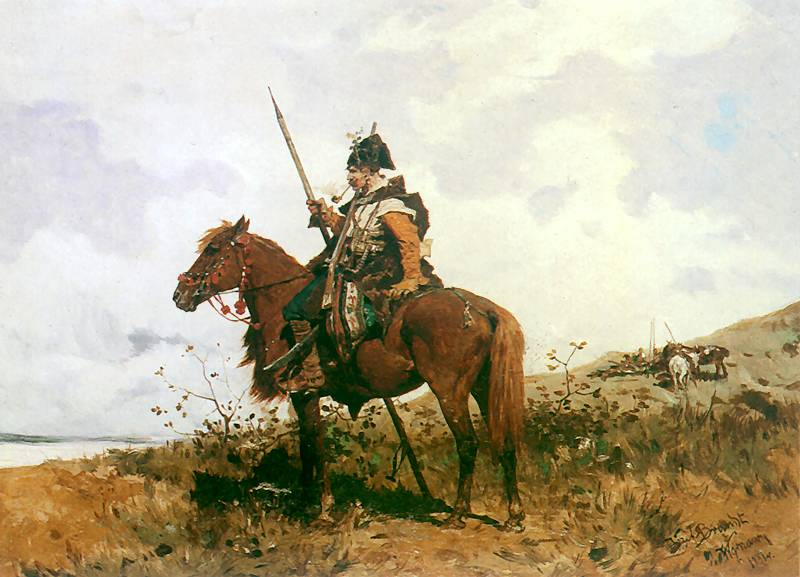
Mounted Cossack (Kozak na koniu), by Józef Brandt, 1881

The Museum, reopened in 1975, now features permanent exhibits on:

- The Swiss in Poland, and Poles in Switzerland;
- History of 19th- and 20th-century Polish emigrations to the West;
- History of the Polish struggle for national independence;
- Distinguished Polish scientists, artists and Nobel laureates;
- Paintings by 19th- and 20th-century Polish artists;
- Jewish culture in Poland;
- Polish folk art.

Additionally, the Museum organizes periodic special exhibits on Polish history and art.

The Polish Museum also features a library, now housed in the Burghof house (seat of the Polish cultural foundation "Libertas"), down the hill from the castle and at the top of a flight of broad steps leading up from the town. The library holds some 20,000 volumes on Polish history and culture, including works in western-European languages. The library's book catalog is accessible on the internet. The library's memorabilia cover several centuries and include items associated with Tadeusz Kościuszko, Henryk Sienkiewicz, Władysław Reymont and Jan Nowak-Jeziorański.

In 2008, some Rapperswil residents petitioned local authorities to evict the Polish Museum from its home in the Rapperswil Castle. The Museum conducted a petition campaign to retain the Museum in the Castle.

== Eviction ==
In late 2014 it was reported that, within two years, Swiss authorities would be evicting the Polish Museum from its 12th-century home, the Rapperswil Castle overlooking Lake Zürich.

The castle is to be modernized and privatized, and the part currently housing the Polish Museum is to be turned into a restaurant. The castle will also become home to a local museum.

The Polish Museum's director, Anna Buchmann, attributed its looming eviction to the anti-Polonism of local politicians, particularly the owner of a local newspaper.

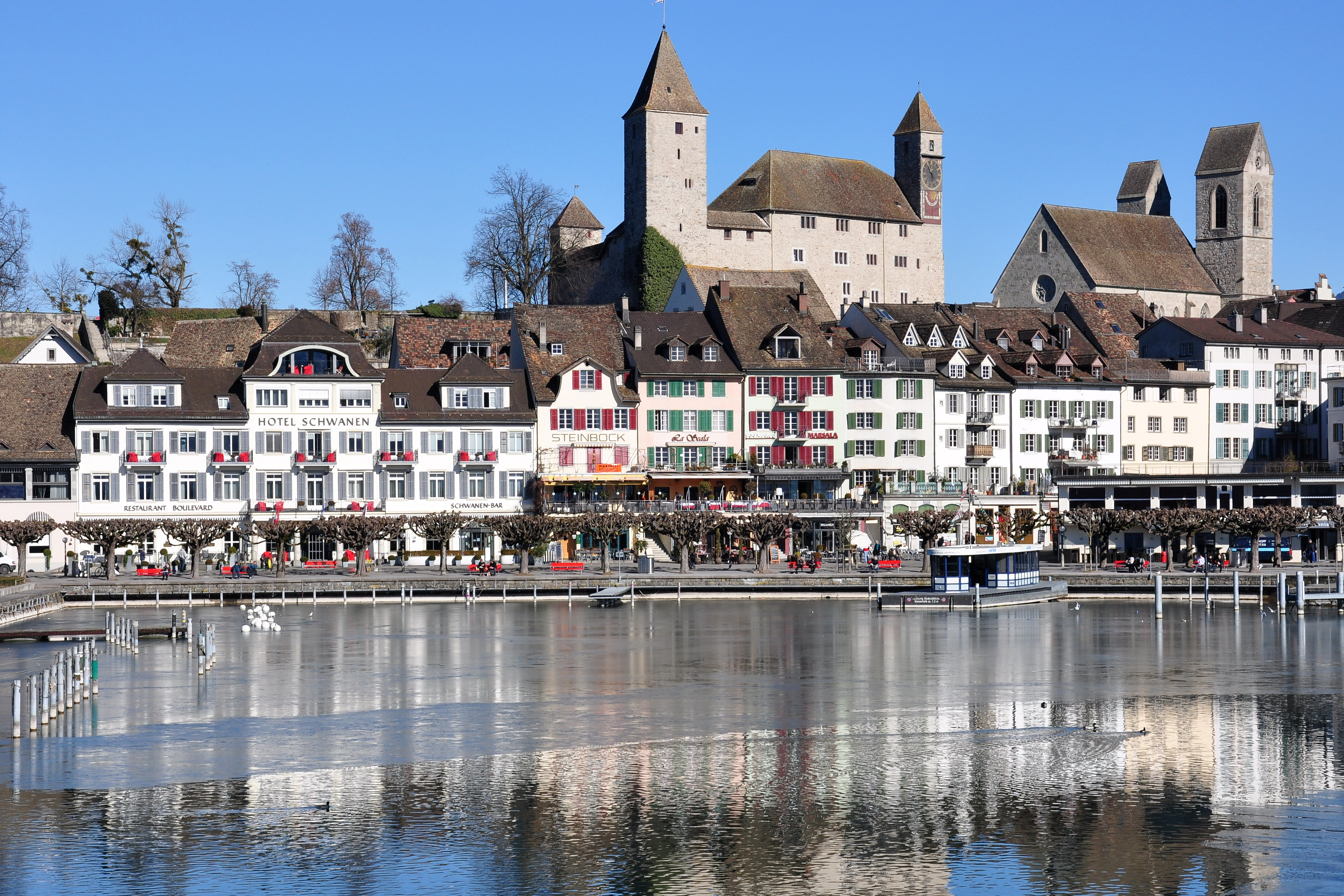
Schwanen Hotel, Rapperswil, with castle in the background

The Polish government had been unable to prevent the Museum's eviction. According to Kazimierz Ujazdowski, a member of Poland's Sejm (parliament) and former Polish Minister of Culture, the eviction could have been prevented. Ujazdowski told Poland's Radio Maryja: "The response of Poland's government was too late and too lackadaisical."

Until June 2022 it was not known where the Polish Museum's collections would be moved to. It was then agreed, after a belated intervention by the Polish government which bought the new site on the lakeside, that the collection will be moving in the next two years, to the former Schwanen Hotel.

On July 1, 2022, Piotr Gliński, then Minister of Culture and National Heritage, signed a letter of intent under which the Polish Cultural Foundation “Libertas,” owner of the artifacts to be exhibited at the facility, and the Society of Friends of the Polish Museum in Rapperswil were to organize a new institution in cooperation with the ministry. On October 4, 2024, the minister, Hanna Wróblewska, informed both institutions that she was withdrawing from the project to co-run the Polish Museum in Switzerland, citing as the reason “the challenges currently faced by the Polish state resulting from financial and geopolitical conditions”.

== Librarians ==
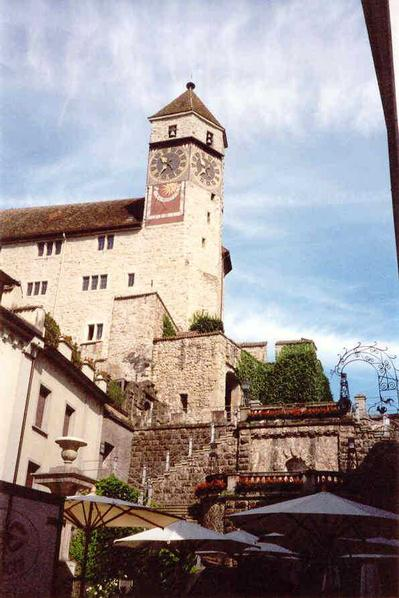
Rapperswil Castle, viewed from the town

The Museum's librarians up to 1927, when the Museum collections were repatriated to Poland—some, historically prominent men—included:

- 1892–1894 – Zygmunt Wasilewski
- 1892–1896 – Stefan Żeromski
- 1896–1899 – Romuald Mielczarski
- 1899–1901 – Stanisław Grabski
- 1901–1910 – Florian Znaniecki, Kazimierz Woźnicki, Wacław Karczewski, Żelisław Grotowski (assistant, 1906)
- 1908–1910 – Władysław Kłyszewski, Stanisław Zieliński
- 1915–1927 – Adam Lewak
- 1970–1983 – Wojciech Starzyński
- 1983–1989 – Piotr Mojski
- 1989–2016 – Anna Piotrowska
- 2016–2018 – Sylwia Bielak
- from 2018 – Katarzyna Helińska

== Visitors ==
- Bolesław Prus (1895)
- Bronisław Piłsudski (1915)

== See also ==
- List of museums in Switzerland
- Polish culture during World War II
- Polish National Museum

== Sources ==
- Janusz S. Morkowski, Polish Museum, Rapperswil: Guide through the Exposition (trilingual English-German-Polish guidebook), Rapperswil, 1994, ISBN 83-900559-9-6.
- Gabriela Pauszer-Klonowska, "W Raperswilu śladami Żeromskiego i Prusa" ("In Rapperswil in the Footsteps of Żeromski and Prus"), Problemy: organ Towarzystwa Wiedzy Powszechnej (Problems: Organ of the Society of Universal Knowledge), rok XXV, nr 8 (281) [year XXV, no. 8 (281)], 1969, pp. 466–70.
- Krystyna Tokarzówna and Stanisław Fita, Bolesław Prus, 1847–1912: Kalendarz życia i twórczości (Bolesław Prus, 1847–1912: Calendar of Life and Work), Warsaw, Państwowy Insytut Wydawniczy, 1969.
- "Wyrzucają polskie Muzeum" ("Evicting Polish Museum"), Gwiazda Polarna (The Pole Star), vol. 106, no. 23 (15 November 2014), p. 4.

== Bibliography ==
- Marek Żukow-Karczewski, Sprawa raperswilska (Rapperswil affair), "Życie Literackie", No. 34, 1987, p. 1, 10 (in Polish)
