= Władysław Plater =

Polish-Lithuanian nobleman and revolutionary (1808–1889)

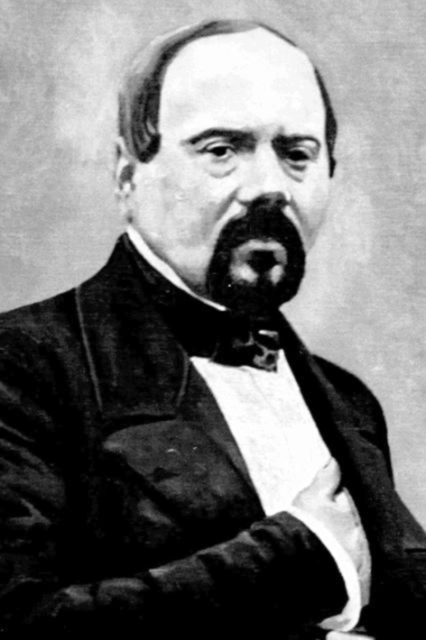
Władysław Plater

Władysław Ewaryst Plater (actually Broel-Plater; Vilnius, 7 November 1808 – 22 April 1889, Broelberg by Kilchberg, near Zurich, Switzerland) was a Polish count, patriot, insurrectionist, and a cousin of Emilia Plater. Together with Agaton Giller, he founded the Polish National Museum in Rapperswil, Switzerland. Brother of Cezary Plater and cousin of Emilia Plater.

== Life ==
A member of the noted polonised Courland family, the Platers, Władysław Plater was a son of Kazimierz Plater and Apolinara Żaba. He took part in the November 1830 Uprising against Imperial Russia. His older cousin, Emilia Plater, played a significant role in the struggle during which she died. His role in the armed insurrection forced him into exile. In 1832 he was one of several figures who succeeded in influencing British public opinion in favour of the Polish cause.

While in exile in Paris among Poland's Great Emigration, he founded the journal Le Polonais (1833–36).

In 1863 Plater was again politically active in the next Polish Uprising against the Russian yoke.

To mark the centenary of the Bar Confederation, in 1868, Plater had a column erected surmounted by a Polish eagle with the Latin inscription, "Magna res libertas" (the great cause of liberty) in the Swiss town of Rapperswil, on the shore of Lake Zurich. Two years later, on 23 October 1870, he founded a Polish National Museum having taken out a 99-year lease on Rapperswil Castle. It was to become a major repository for Polish historic memorabilia, a library and archive based on donations and legacies from members of the Great Emigration. Barely a century later, the collection, previously returned to Warsaw in independent Poland, was set alight in 1944 by the German occupiers as part of their systematic decimation of Polish and Jewish heritage on Polish soil, in a resurgence of their earlier Kulturkampf.

Plater met and married the actress, Karoline Bauer in Rapperswil.

== See also ==
- List of Poles
