= Caroline Bauer =

German actress

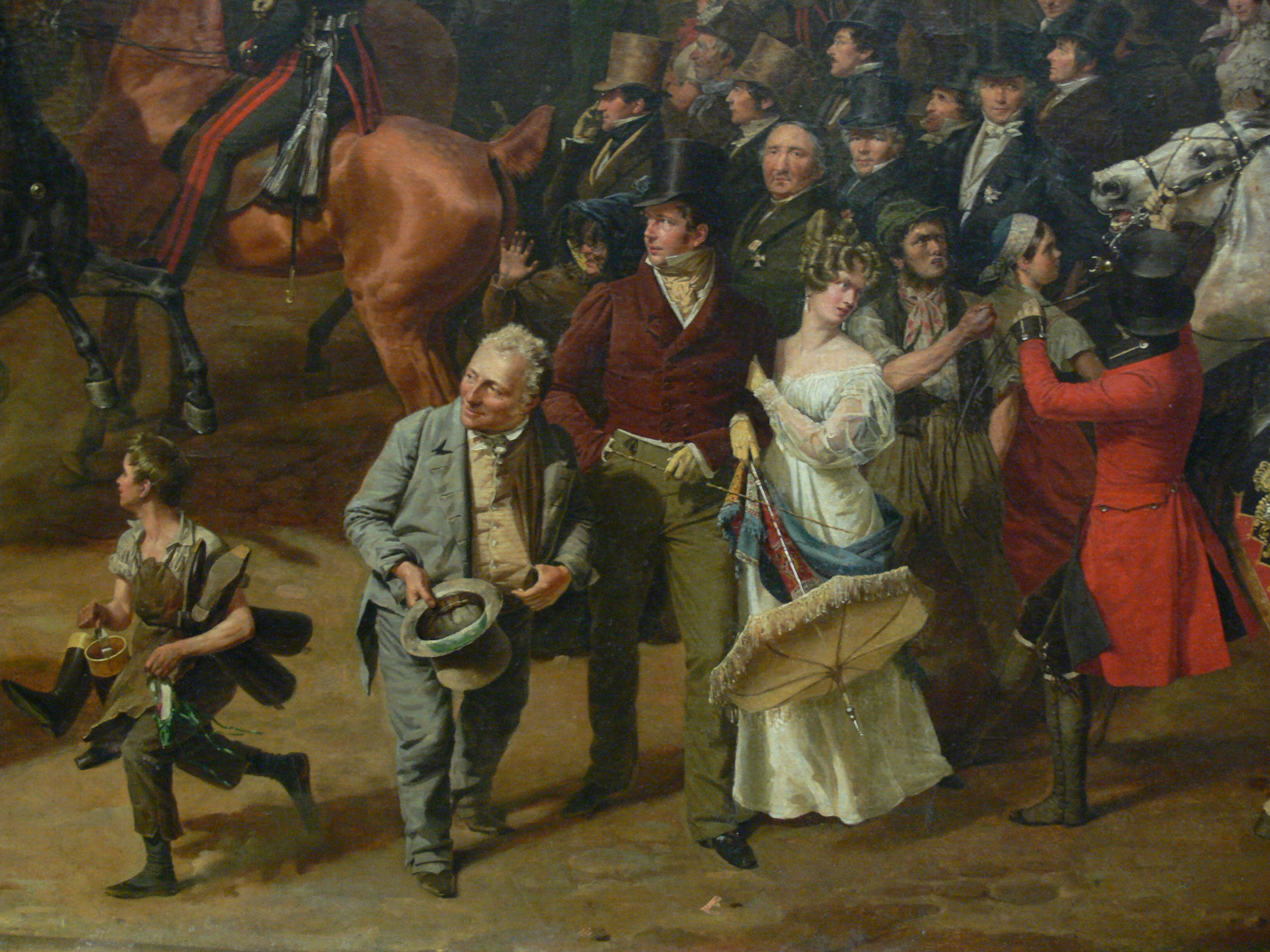
Karoline Bauer (in a white dress) with a group of artists, including Johann Gottfried Schadow, Carl Joseph Begas, Karl Friedrich Schinkel, Karl Wilhelm Wach, and Christian Daniel Rauch. Parade auf dem Opernplatz (Berlin), by Franz Krüger, 1824–1830.

Caroline Bauer (29 March 1807 – 18 October 1877) was a German actress of the Biedermeier era who used the name Lina Bauer.

== Biography ==
Caroline Philippina Augusta Bauer (German: Karoline Philippine Auguste Bauer) was born in Heidelberg, Germany to Heinrich Bauer and Christiane Stockmar. Her siblings were Lottchen, Karl and Louis.

She was during a short time in 1828-1829 the mistress of Prince Leopold of Saxe-Coburg-Saalfeld (later King of Belgium as Leopold I). It was said that she bore a close physical resemblance to Leopold's late wife, Princess Charlotte of Wales, which had been commented on by the Duke of Wellington.

In mid-1829 she and her mother returned to Berlin, and she resumed her career as an actress. She competed with Charlotte von Hagn; the theatre audiences were divided into "Bauerians" and "Hagnerians". Many years later, in her memoirs published posthumously, she declared that she had engaged into a morganatic marriage with Leopold and that he had created her Countess of Montgomery. There was no record of such a marriage or of the existence of such a title. There was, on the contrary, a strong denial by her cousin, the son of Leopold's secretary, baron Christian Friedrich Freiherr von Stockmar.

Her second husband was Wladyslaw Plater, whom she married in 1843. Her cousin, Marie Bauer, was married to Marian Langiewicz, leader of the Polish Insurrection of 1863; they were married in Switzerland. She died by suicide in Kilchberg, Switzerland.

== Literature ==
- Karoline BAUER, Verschollene Herzensgeschichten: Nachgelassene Memoiren, 1884
- Posthumous memoirs of Karoline Bauer, from the German, 2 vol., 1884
- Susanne FÖRSTER, Am Tage Ruhm, am Abend Tränen: Lebenserinnerungen der Schauspielerin Karoline Bauer, Ed. Sporn, 1943
- Caroline Bauer and the Coburgs, 2009
