= Lucjan Plater =

Polish-Lithuanian insurgent and emigration activist

Lucjan Stanisław Count Broel-Plater
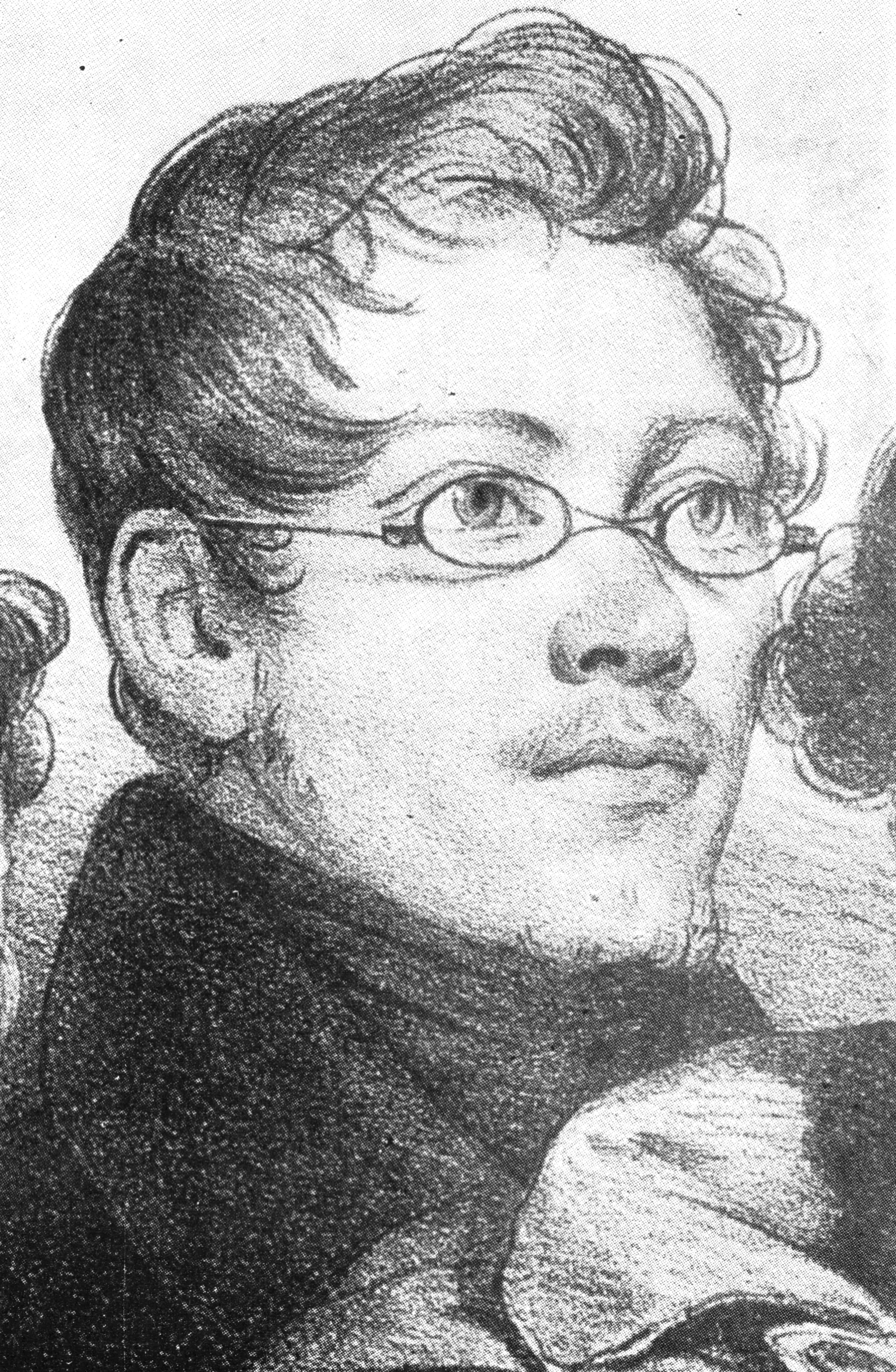
- Portrait of Lucjan Plater, by Jacques-François Llanta
- Born: November 25, 1808; Pomusz
- Died: June 12, 1857 (aged 48); Parramatta
- Occupations: Insurgent and emigration activist

Lucjan Stanisław Count Broel-Plater (born 25 November 1808 in Pomusz, died 12 June 1857 in Parramatta) was a Polish-Lithuanian insurgent and emigration activist, son of Tadeusz, owner of Svobiškis and Pomusz villages, and Rachela Kościuszko.

== Biography ==
Together with his younger brother Ferdinand he served in the Russian officer school in Dinaburg. The brothers, together with their cousin Emilia, were part of a conspiracy to capture the Dinaburg Fortress. The conspiracy failed, the brothers deserted on 22 April 1831 and joined a unit of Walenty Brochocki, where they received the rank of second lieutenants.

After the fall of the uprising, the brothers emigrated via Bavaria to France. Ferdinand took part in the march of the famous "Sacred Host" to help the Frankfurt uprising on 7 April 1833, but was interned in Switzerland. Lucjan stayed in Avignon, then in Paris, where he worked in the editorial office of the "Pielgrzym Polski" (English: Polish Pilgrim). On 9 September 1833, he joined the Polish Democratic Society. In 1835 he was sent to Poland under the assumed name of Laurance. In April that year he planned to join the Egyptian army, but this did not happen. On 22 November 1835 he emigrated to London, where he received a refugee certificate.

Following in the footsteps of his wife's sister Laura, married to prince Konstanty Drucki-Lubecki, he left with his brother for Australia in September 1839. The brothers supported themselves there by making confectionery, which Ferdinand learnt in France.

Lucjan Stanisław died on 12 June 1857 in Parramatta, today a part of Sydney.

== Family ==
On 12 October 1836 he married Charlotte Duffus (1813–1885), daughter of a West India planter. They had five sons and three daughters, who were brought up by Ferdinand after Lucjan's death.

Lucjan's descendants living in Australia use the surname 'de Plater', some of them cultivates Polish traditions.

Children:

- Emilia (born 1838)
- Ferdynand Jan (1840–1909), married to Elizabeth Frances Doyle
- Lucjan Stanisław (1841–1931), married to Lucy Clara Rusten
- Rachela (born 1843)
- Józefa (born 1846)
- Ludwik (born 1850)
- Kazimierz (born 1853)
- Michał August Władysław (1856–1948), married to Eliza Harper, and again to Mary Ann Toomey

== Commemoration ==
The fate of Lucjan and Ferdinand Plater became the plot of the novel "Transplanted Lime Tree" by Collinridge Rivett (1923–2008), an Australian journalist. The novel was published in episodes in 1957–58 in "Parramatta and Hills News".

== Sources ==
- Paszkowski, Lech (1981). "Lucjan Stanisław Plater". Polski Słownik Biograficzny (in Polish). Vol. 26. Wrocław. p. 678.
