= Przylasek =

- Village
- Location within Poland
- Coordinates: 51°02′40″N 15°12′17″E
- Country: Poland
- Voivodeship: Lower Silesian
- County: Lubań
- Gmina: Platerówka
- Elevation: 50 m (160 ft)
- Population: 41

Przylasek [pʂɨˈlasɛk] is a village in the administrative district of Gmina Platerówka, within Lubań County, Lower Silesian Voivodeship, in south-western Poland.
