= Antonina Tomaszewska =

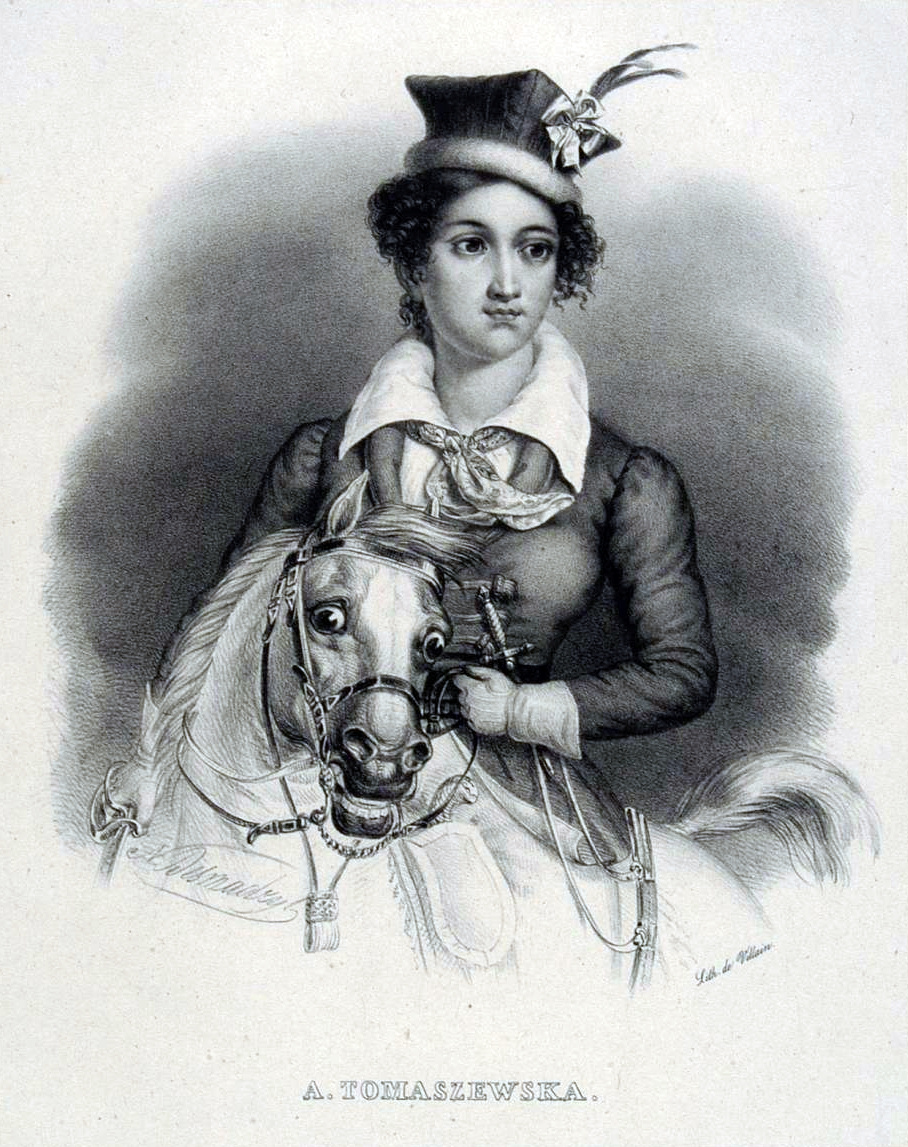
Antonina Tomaszewska dressed in the garb of a Polish lancer

Antonina Tomaszewska (1814–1883) was a Polish-Lithuanian noblewoman and rebel. She participated in the November Uprising against the Russian Empire; her actions during the revolt led to her being cited as an example of female heroism in the Polish independence movement.

== Biography ==
Tomaszewska was born in 1814 in Raseiniai, Samogitia, then part of the Russian Empire and previously part of the Polish–Lithuanian Commonwealth. She was born into the Polish-Lithuanian nobility, and was educated at a Benedictine monastery in Kražiai. While she was attending the monastery, a large-scale revolt broke out in Warsaw against the Russian garrison of the city. This revolt grew into the November Uprising of 1830–1831, during which the pro-independence Polish National Government organized local resistance groups to fight against the Imperial Russian Army. Tomaszewska left her monastery and joined one of these groups, equipping herself with a horse, lance, and sabre. She proved a skillful enough combatant to join an organized Polish unit of lancers.

During the uprising, Tomaszewska fought in a number of battles against the Russian Army, often with distinction; during one battle between her unit and a Russian detachment of Circassian cavalry, she fought as part of the first row of combatants.

Following the defeat of the uprising, Tomaszewska fled with her unit into exile in Prussia. She later emigrated France, where she married a former Polish officer. She returned to the Russian-controlled province of Poland later in life, where she settled in Płock. She died in 1883.

== See also ==
- Emilia Plater
