= Platter =

Platter may refer to:

- Platter (album), by Jock Cheese
- Platter (dinner), a meal of several components served together on a platter or in a basket
- Platter (dishware), large dish used for serving food
- Platter (horse), American Champion racehorse
- Platter, Oklahoma, U.S.
- Hard disk drive platter, part of a computer hard drive
- A platter lift, a mechanized system for pulling skiers and snowboarders uphill
- The Platters, an American vocal group
- Platter, a part of a turntable
- PLATTER, an acronym for the Planning Tool for Trusted Electronic Repositories developed by Humanities Advanced Technology and Information Institute

== People with the surname ==
- Bruno Platter (1944–), Grand master of the Teutonic Order
- Luanne Platter, fictional character in the animated series King of the Hill
- Thomas Platter (1499–1582), humanist scholar and writer
- Thomas Platter the Younger (c.1574 – 1628), Swiss-born physician, traveller and diarist

== See also ==
- Plater (surname)
