= Kapčiamiestis =

- Town
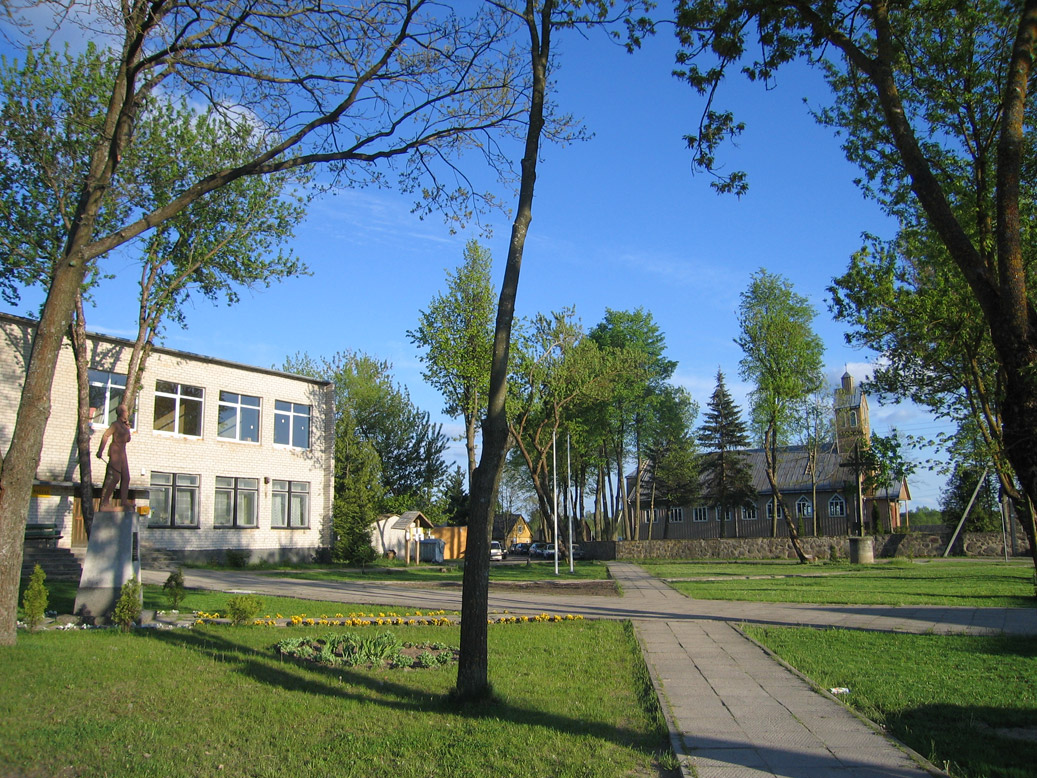
- Central square

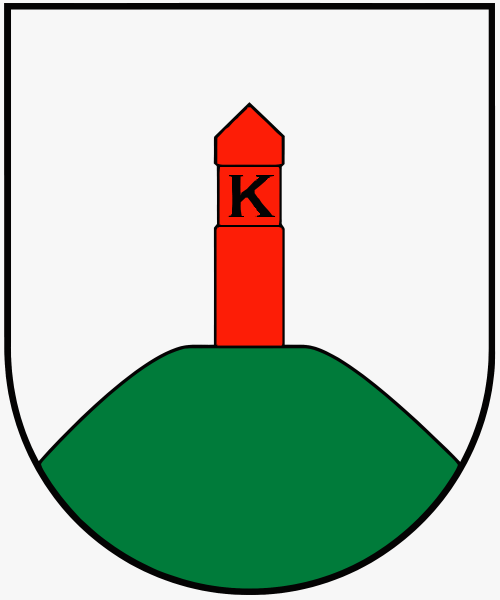
- Coat of arms

- Location of Kapčiamiestis
- Coordinates: 54°0′0″N 23°39′30″E
- Country: Lithuania
- Ethnographic region: Dzūkija
- County: Alytus County
- Municipality: Lazdijai district municipality
- Eldership: Kapčiamiestis eldership
- Capital of: Kapčiamiestis eldership
- First mentioned: 16th century

Population (2021)
  - Total: 478
- Time zone: UTC+2 (EET)
  - Summer (DST): UTC+3 (EEST)

Kapčiamiestis (Note: Polish: Kopciowo) is a town in southern Lithuania located close to the border with Belarus and near the confluence of Baltoji Ančia and Nieda rivers.

== History ==
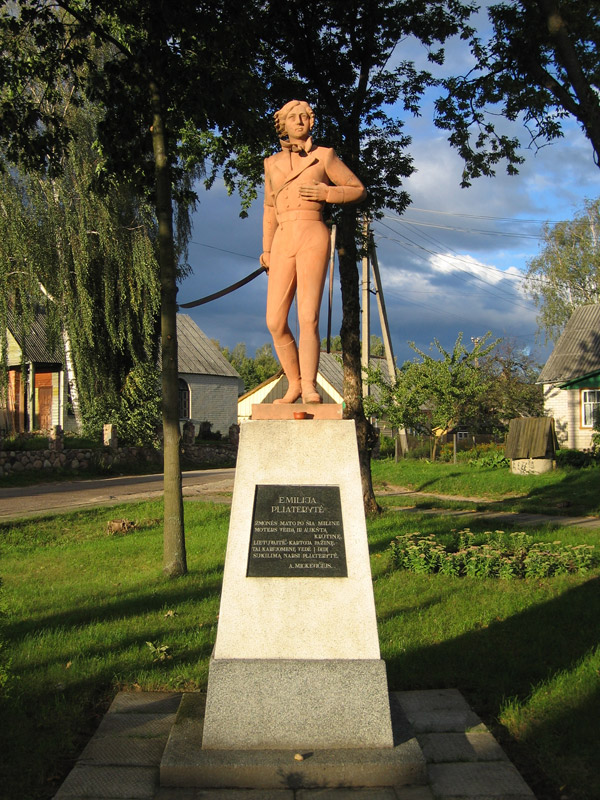
Emilia Plater Monument

Kapčiamiestis traces its history back to the early 16th century, when a manor was built. It was the possession of various noble families. In 1729, Mikołaj Ogiński founded the local Catholic church, which Bishop Ignacy Jakub Massalski designated a parish church. In 1777, a parish school was opened.

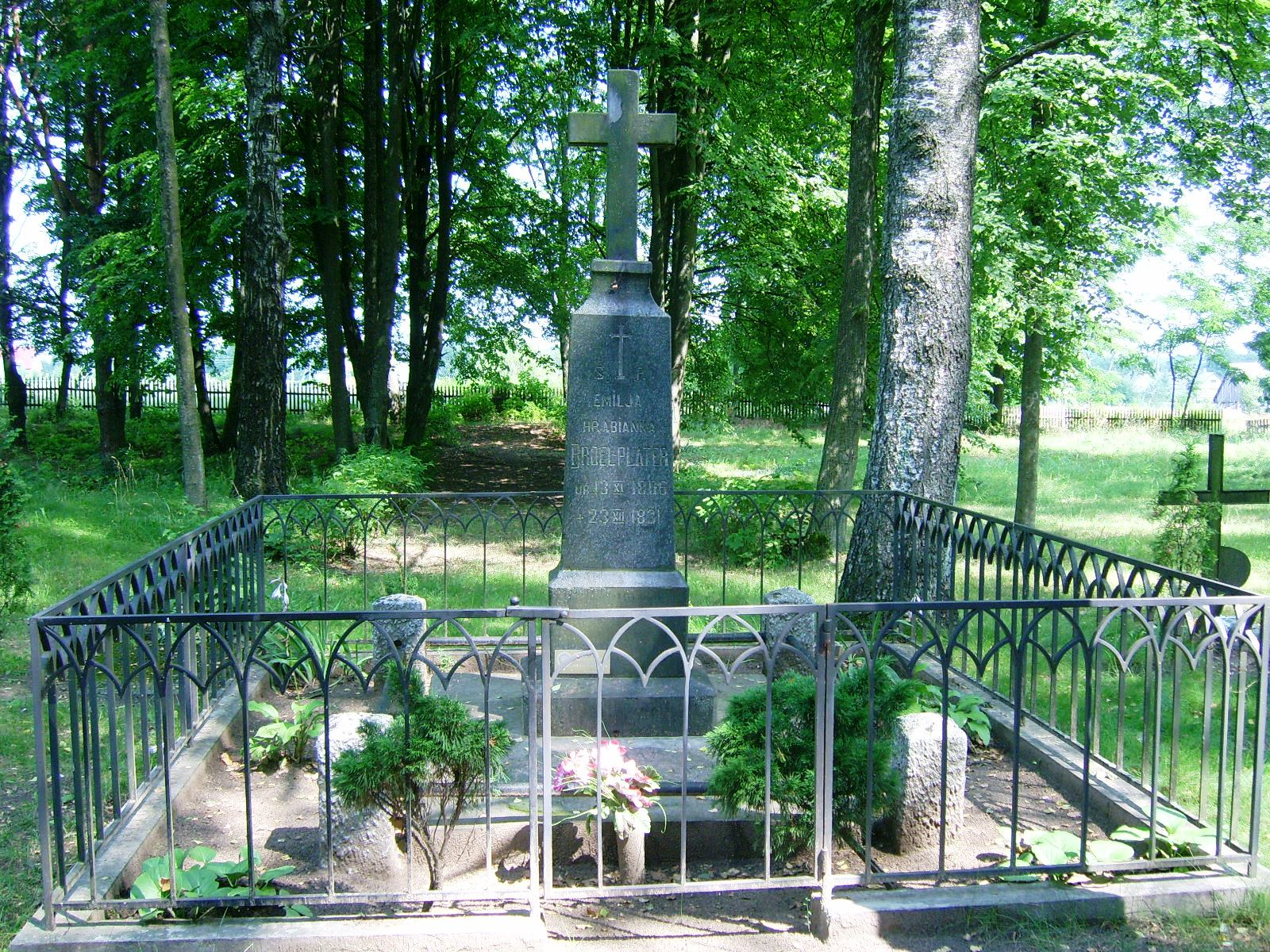
Emilia Plater tombstone

Following the Third Partition of Poland (1795), it was annexed by Prussia. In 1807, it became part of the short-lived Polish Duchy of Warsaw, and after the duchy's dissolution, it was part of Russian-controlled Congress Poland until World War I. The town's cemetery contains the grave of Polish–Lithuanian national hero Emilia Plater, buried in 1831. The town had an important Jewish community.

During World War II, the Germans entered the town on 22 June 1941. On 15 September 1941, all of the Jews were taken under high security to Lazdijai. There they were put into a ghetto established in Katkishes, one kilometer outside of Lazdijai, where Jews from neighboring villages were interned. On 3 November 1941 the Jews of Kapčiamiestis were murdered with the rest of the ghetto inhabitants. Polish partisans of the Home Army launched two attacks on a German gendarmerie post in the town, on 8 December 1943 and 17 March 1944. Kapčiamiestis was devastated by World War II, after which most of the historical buildings were destroyed.
