= Emilia Plater =

Polish–Lithuanian noblewoman and revolutionary (1806–1831)

Countess Emilia Plater
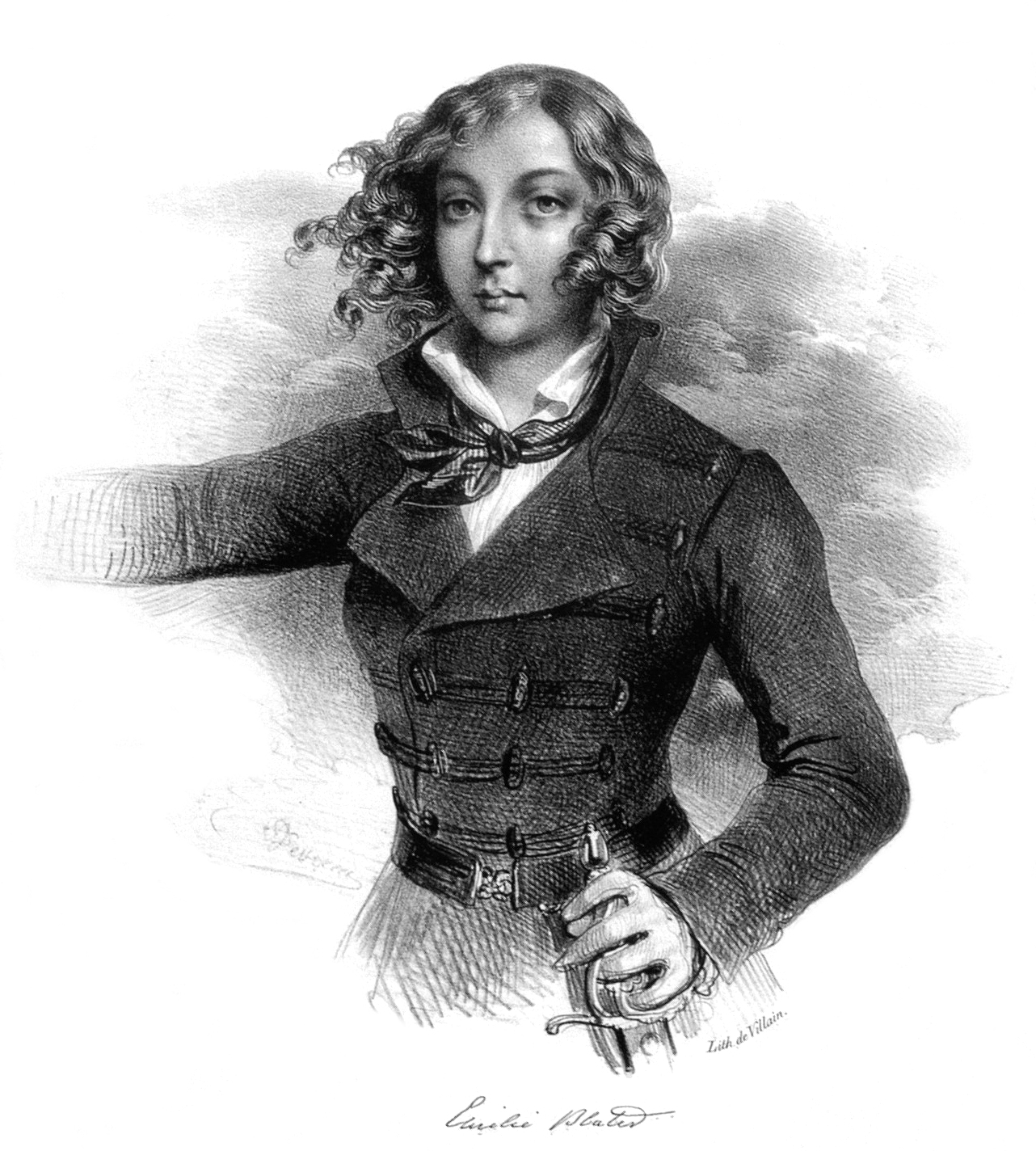
- Emilia Plater, anonymous 19th-century engraving
- Coat of arms: Plater coat of arms
- Born: 13 November 1806; Vilnius, Russian Empire
- Died: 23 December 1831 (aged 25); Justinavas Manor, Congress Poland
- Buried: Kapčiamiestis
- Noble family: Plater
- Father: Franciszek Ksawery Plater
- Mother: Anna von der Mohl (Anna z Mohlów)
- Military career
- Allegiance: Polish–Lithuanian insurgents
- Service years: 1831
- Rank: Captain
- Unit: Lithuanian 25th Infantry Regiment
- Conflicts: November Uprising

Early 19th-century oil on card portrait miniature of Countess Emilia Plater (c. 1831–1835) after Carl Ferdinand Mayer, in its original Biedermeier frame.

Emilia Plater (Lithuanian: Emilija Pliaterytė; 13 November 1806 – 23 December 1831) was a Polish-Lithuanian noblewoman and participant in the November Uprising of 1830–1831 against the Russian Empire. Born in Vilnius and raised in Polish Livonia, she joined the uprising in the former Grand Duchy of Lithuania in March 1831. She became one of the best-known female participants in the insurrection and was granted the rank of captain by General Dezydery Chłapowski, although the extent of her actual military command remains uncertain.

Plater participated in the insurgent campaign in Lithuania and refused to follow the withdrawing Polish forces into Prussia in July 1831. Instead, she attempted to reach the insurgent army in Congress Poland, but fell ill during the journey. She died in December 1831 at the age of 25 and was buried in Kapčiamiestis, in present-day Lithuania.

Her military exploits, some of which were embellished in later accounts, made her an enduring symbol of the struggle for Polish independence. Immortalised in Adam Mickiewicz's 1832 poem The Death of a Colonel, she became celebrated as the "Polish Joan of Arc" and has also been commemorated in Lithuania and Belarus.

== Biography ==
=== Early life ===
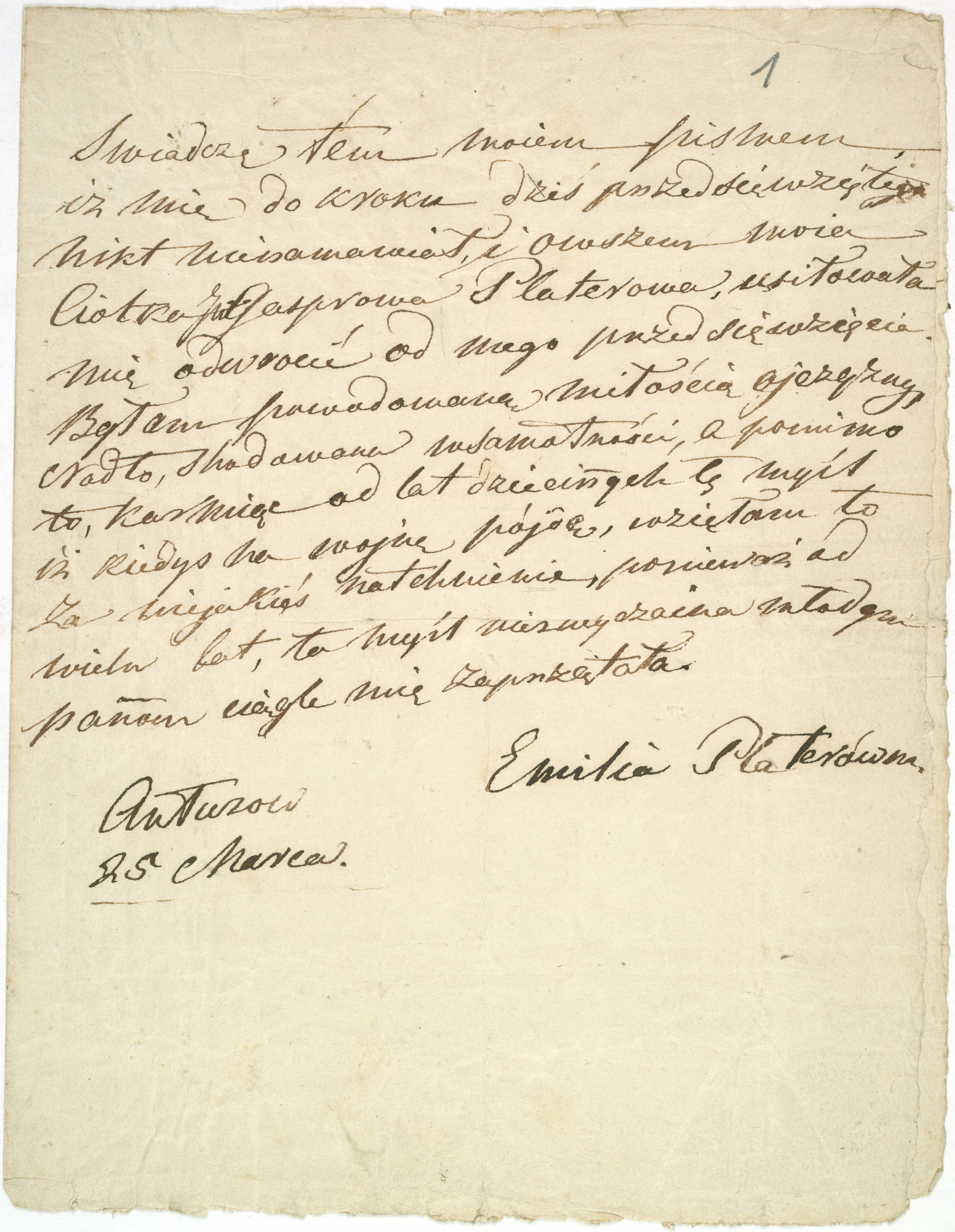
Plater's statement of 25 March 1831 on joining the November Uprising

Emilia Plater was born in Vilnius into a noble Polish–Lithuanian Plater family. Her family, of the Plater coat of arms, had German ancestry, tracing its roots to Westphalia, but was thoroughly Polonized. Much of the family relocated to Livonia during the 15th century and later to the Grand Duchy of Lithuania, of which Vilnius is the capital. She is described as either Polish, Polish-Lithuanian or Lithuanian.

Her parents, Count Franciszek Ksawery Plater (1785–1837) and Anna née Mohl (1785–1830), divorced in 1815 when she was nine years old. Following her parents' separation in 1815, Plater moved with her mother to Līksna in Polish Livonia, where they lived with their relatives, Count Michał Plater-Zyberk and his wife Izabela Helena. It was an aristocratic family that owned several manors along the Daugava River with about 15,000 serfs. Plater-Zyberk served as vice-governor of the Vilna Governorate under governor Franciszek Ksawery Drucki-Lubecki. Plater's tutors included Wilhelm von Dalwig, a captain and military engineer working on the Daugavpils Fortress. Well-educated, Plater was brought up to appreciate the efforts of Tadeusz Kościuszko and the Prince Józef Poniatowski. She was fascinated by Johann Wolfgang von Goethe and Friedrich Schiller, whom she could read in the original German language. She was raised in an environment that valued the history of Poland, and her literary heroes included Princess Wanda and Adam Mickiewicz's Grażyna. She also admired Laskarina Bouboulina, a woman who became one of the icons of the Greek uprising against the Ottomans, Polish fighter Anna Dorota Chrzanowska, as well as Joan of Arc. These pursuits were accompanied by a childhood interest in equestrianism and marksmanship, quite uncommon for early 19th-century girls from aristocratic families. According to a memoir account cited by historian Stefan Kieniewicz, Plater also took an interest in the life and folklore of the Belarusian-speaking population, collecting folk songs and attempting to imitate them in her own writing.

In 1823, one of her cousins was forcibly conscripted into the Imperial Russian Army as punishment for celebrating the Constitution of 3 May; this incident is said to be a key event in her life and to have galvanised her pro-Polish, anti-Russian attitude. In 1829, Plater began a grand tour throughout the historical Polish–Lithuanian Commonwealth, visiting Warsaw and Kraków, and the battlefield of Raszyn. Her mother died a year later; her father remarried and refused to even meet his daughter. After the outbreak of the November Uprising against Imperial Russia, she became a vocal supporter of the anti-Tsarist sentiments in the lands of the former Grand Duchy of Lithuania. A dozen or so females joined the uprising, including Antonina Tomaszewska, but Plater became the most famous of them all.

=== Uprising ===
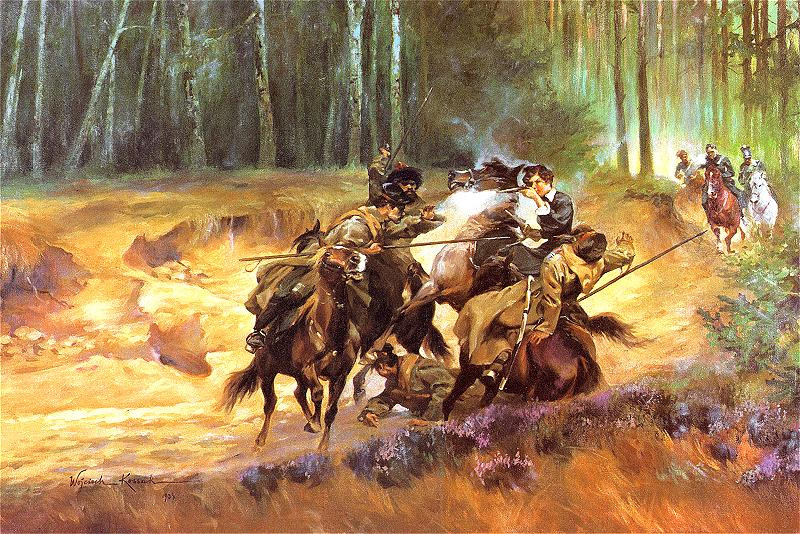
Emilia Plater in a skirmish at Šiauliai by Wojciech Kossak

In her note from 25 March written at the Antazavė Manor, Plater claims that joining the uprising was her sole idea and that she had hoped to go to war her entire life. She cut her hair, prepared a uniform for herself and organised and equipped a group of volunteers. She went to her cousin Cezary Plater in Dusetos and delivered a passionate speech after a mass on 29 March. The following day, her group attacked a post station in Daugailiai and captured horses for her unit. On 4 April, she signed a declaratory document marking her access to the local uprising forces. The same day, her unit is rumoured to have seized the town of Zarasai, although the historians are not sure this event really occurred.

She planned to take Daugavpils where two of her cousins, Lucjan and Ferdynand Plater, attended a military school and hoped to start an uprising from within, but after a reconnaissance mission discovered that the city was defended by a strong garrison and was impregnable to attack by such a small force as her own unit, that plan was abandoned. Her unit was composed of roughly 280 infantry, 60 cavalry and several hundred peasants armed with war scythes. She then turned to Samogitia and headed for Panevėžys, where on 30 April she joined forces with the unit commanded by Karol Teofil Załuski. On 4 May, she fought at the battle of Prastavoniai; shortly afterwards, with Konstanty Parczewski, she fought at Maišiagala. On 5 May, she witnessed General Dezydery Chłapowski entering the area with a large force and taking command over all units fighting in the former Grand Duchy.

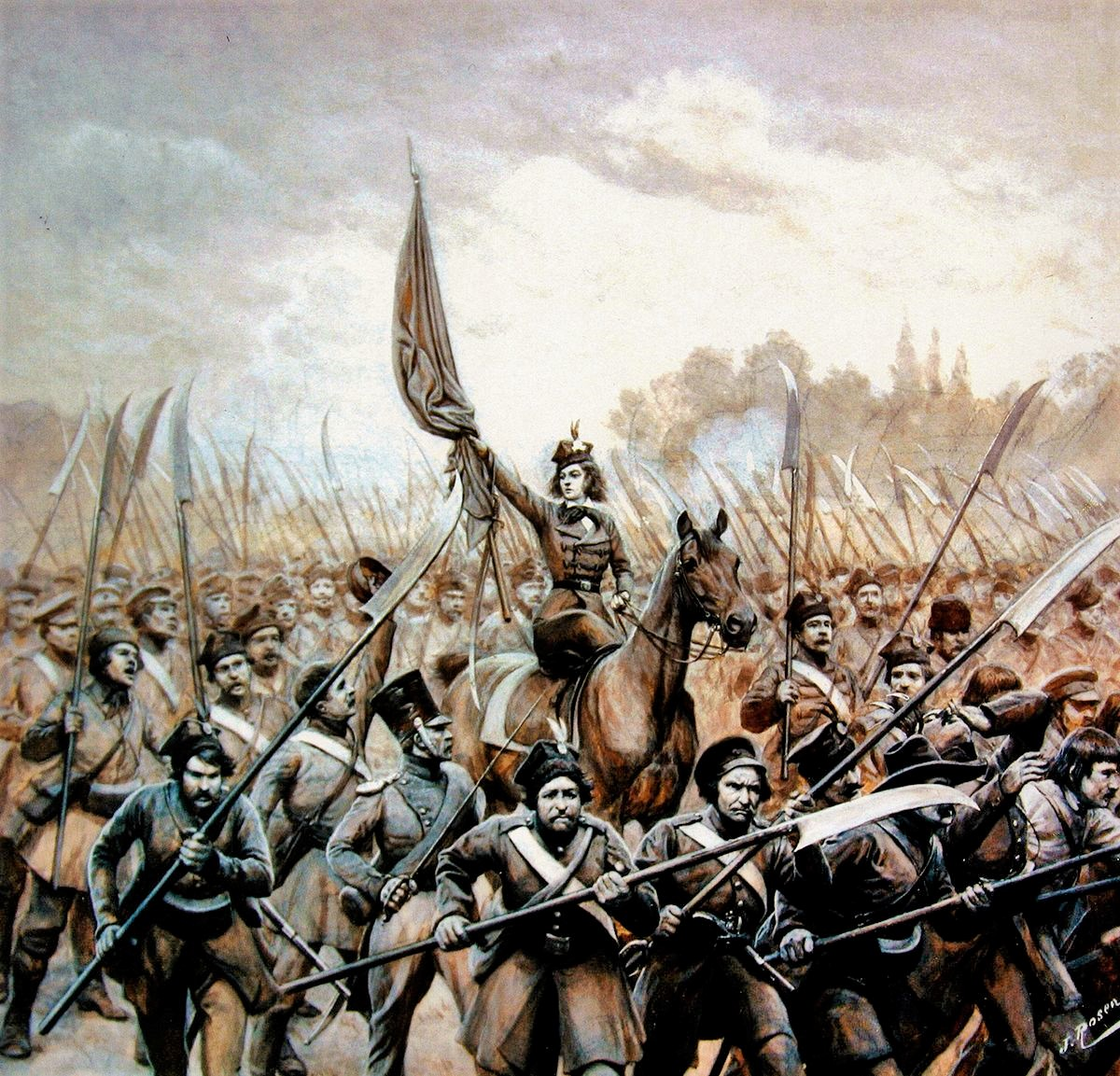
Emilia Plater leading peasant scythemen; painted by Jan Rosen

Chłapowski advised Plater to stand down and return home. She allegedly replied that she had no intention of taking off her uniform until her fatherland was fully liberated. Her decision was accepted, and she was made a commanding officer of the 1st Company of the Lithuanian 25th Infantry Regiment. She was promoted to the rank of captain, the highest rank awarded to a woman at that time. Her companion, Maria Raszanowicz, was promoted to poruchik (lieutenant). She spent some time in Kaunas before the insurgents were forced to retreat in late June. On 8 July, the insurgents tried to capture Šiauliai but were defeated by the Russians. Plater's unit was responsible for protecting the baggage train carrying supplies. When the train was attacked, about 300 insurgents were killed, and the supplies were captured by the Russians.

The following day, General Chłapowski decided to cross the border into Prussia and become interned there. Plater vocally criticised that decision, refused to follow orders and instead decided to try to break through to Warsaw and continue the fight. However, after separating from the main force, accompanied by Maria Raszanowicz and her cousin Cezary Plater, she became seriously ill. The uprising ended in October, and many of her biographies claim that the heartbreak exacerbated her illness, leading to her death. She died in the Justinavas Manor of the Abłamowicz family (now Vainežeris) on 23 December 1831. She was buried in the small town of Kapčiamiestis near Lazdijai. After the uprising's defeat, the Russian authorities confiscated her estate.

Stefan Kieniewicz, in a more critical treatment in the Polish Biographical Dictionary, notes that a lot of her exploits are poorly documented, and it is not always possible to separate legend from fact. He notes it is not certain she ever commanded any unit, and that her role as the company commander of the 25th Regiment was more honorary than real. At Prastavoniai, she fainted from fatigue and fell off her horse. She had to be rescued at Kaunas, though accounts vary. One version says her clothes caught on a gate as she rode through, and she fell off her horse but was rescued by S. Maciewicz. Another version claims she fought valiantly and refused to retreat, but Colonel Kiekiernicki rescued her. At Šiauliai, her comrades deliberately kept her behind the front lines to ensure she would not endanger herself.

== Legacy ==
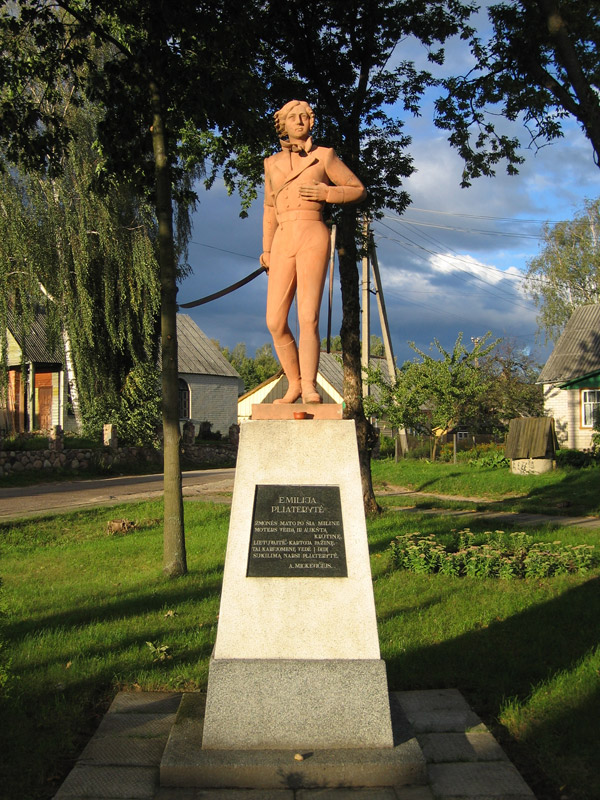
Emilia Plater monument in Kapčiamiestis, Lithuania, where she is buried

The first poem about Plater was composed by Konstanty Gaszyński in June 1831. Her life and death were widely publicised shortly afterwards by the Polish press, which contributed to her growing fame. The image of the maiden warrior became popular and became a symbol of the uprising. Adam Mickiewicz immortalized her in his 1832 poem, Śmierć pułkownika (Death of a Colonel) where he called her up as a leader, although the description of her death is a pure poetical fiction and was only loosely based on her real life. The poem promotes Plater from captain to colonel and refers to her as the leader of the uprising. Mickiewicz also idealises her personality and skills, portraying her as the ideal commander worshipped by her soldiers. That poem has been included in the elementary curriculum in communist and independent Poland.

Other literary works based on her life were published, mostly abroad, both by Polish émigrés and by foreigners. In the Polish literature, Plater's life is featured in a novel by Wacław Gąsiorowski, seven plays, and several poems, including those by Antoni Edward Odyniec and Maria Konopnicka. A four-act play Les Polonais: événements historique by Charles Prosper was performed at the Cirque Olympique in Paris in 1831. Other plays were written by Janina Sedlaczek (1895), Władysław Winiarski (1912), Adam Znamirowski (1915), Eustachy Czekalski (1917), Wanda Brzeska (1927), Tadeusz Korczyński (1933), Tadeusz Orsza Korpal (1937). A Lithuanian play by Antanas Vienuolis was staged by the Kaunas State Theatre in 1939. A poetic drama by Judita Vaičiūnaitė was broadcast by the LRT Radijas.

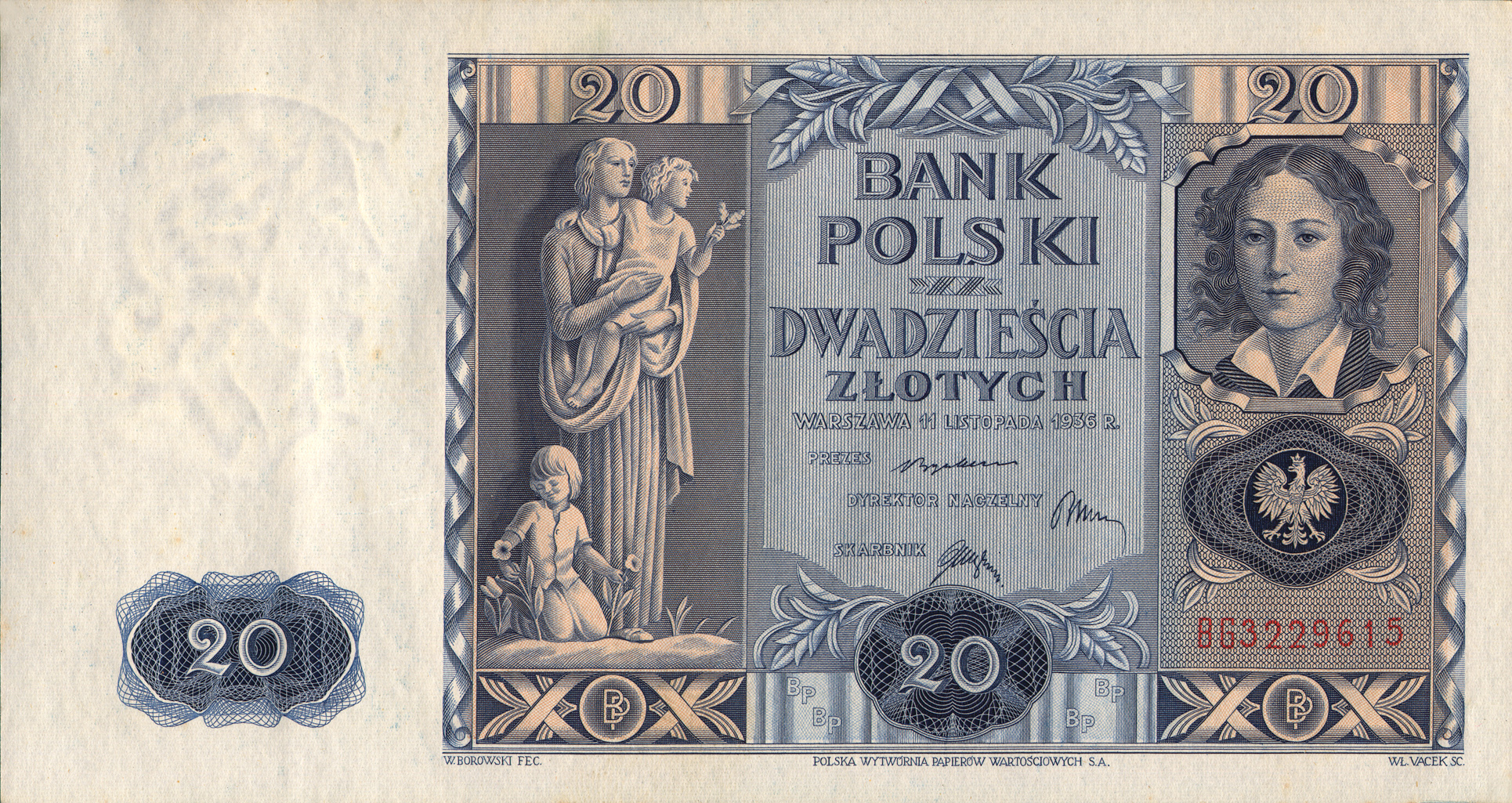
20 zloty note depicting Plater

Józef Straszewicz published three successive versions of her biography in French. An English translation, supported by among others President John Tyler, was published in New York in 1843. Most of the later biographers and writers largely follow the idealised version of her life presented by Straszewicz. Plater was also featured as a role model in the Woman in the Nineteenth Century (1845) by the women's rights advocate Margaret Fuller. In 1996, Halina Filipowicz published a study from a feminist perspective on Plater's legacy on gender roles and stereotypes in Poland.

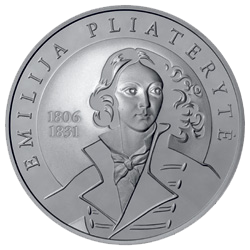
Lithuanian 50 litų coin commemorating the 200th anniversary of Plater's birth.

She also became the theme of paintings by several artists of the epoch, among them Hippolyte Bellangé, Achille Deveria, Philipp Veit, and Wojciech Kossak. A lithograph by François Le Villain based on Deveria's work became one of the most recognisable portraits of her, popularising her image as a delicate and noble female warrior.

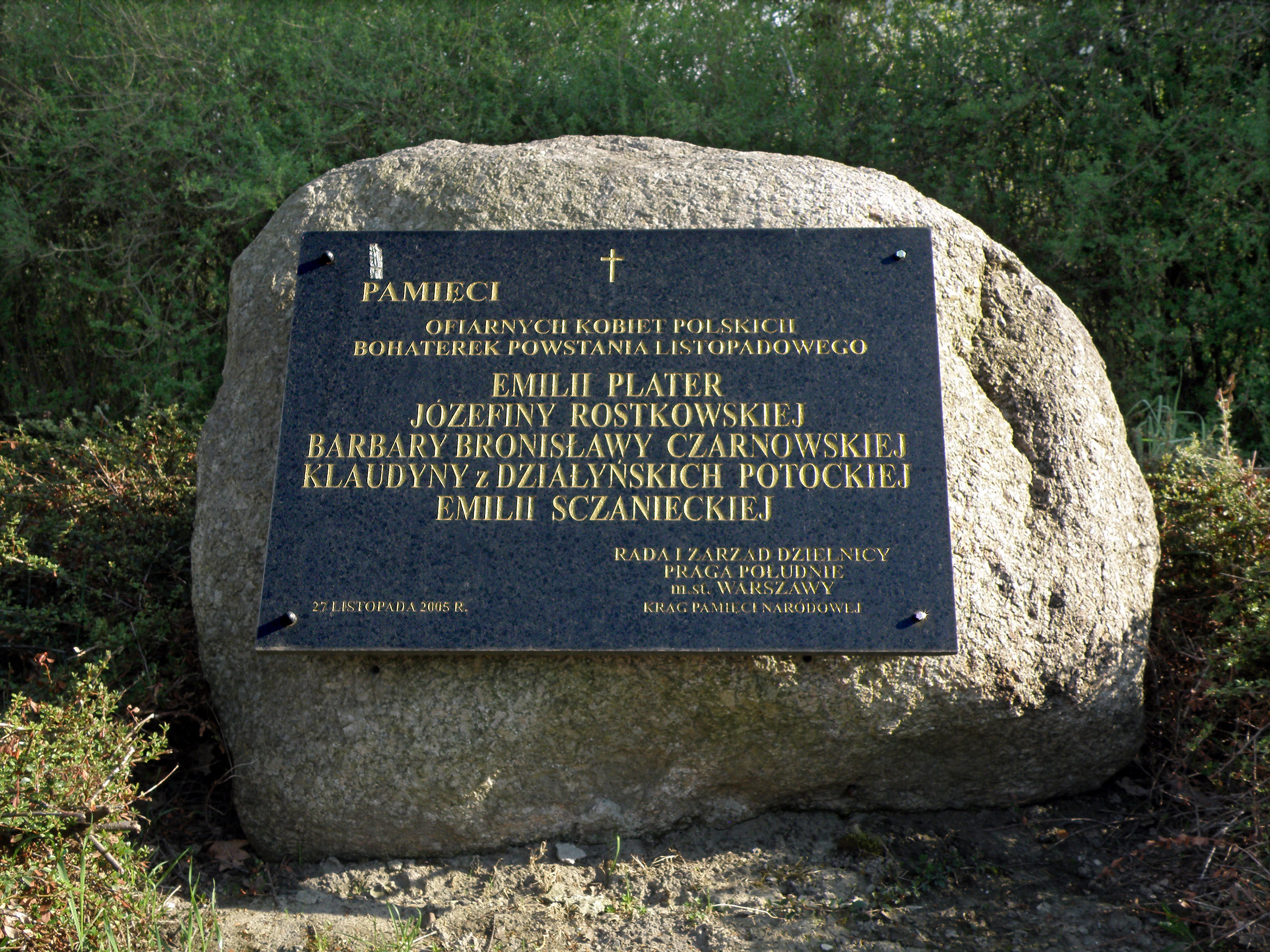
Memory boulder commemorating heroines of the November Uprising: Barbara Bronisława Czarnowska, Plater and Józefa Rostkowska

Emilia Plater has been depicted on the 50 zloty note in 1940. She was depicted on the Second Polish Republic's 20 zloty note. During World War II, a Polish female support unit, Emilia Plater 1st Independent Women's Battalion, a part of the Soviet Polish 1st Tadeusz Kościuszko Infantry Division was named in her honor; its former members founded a village of Platerówka in Lower Silesia. Several streets, including one in Warsaw In Kapčiamiestis, a small memorial museum in her honor was opened in 1984 and a monument to Plater by sculptor Antanas Ambrulevičius was erected in 1999.

Emilia Plater is a patron of 14 schools in Poland and several in Lithuania.

Artistic and historical exhibitions commemorating Emilia Plater have taken place in Belarus, although the official state ideology of the Lukashenko regime largely ignores her.

== See also ==
- Maria Piotrowiczowa, female insurgent of the 1863 Polish uprising
