= Włosień, Lower Silesian Voivodeship =

Włosień
- Village
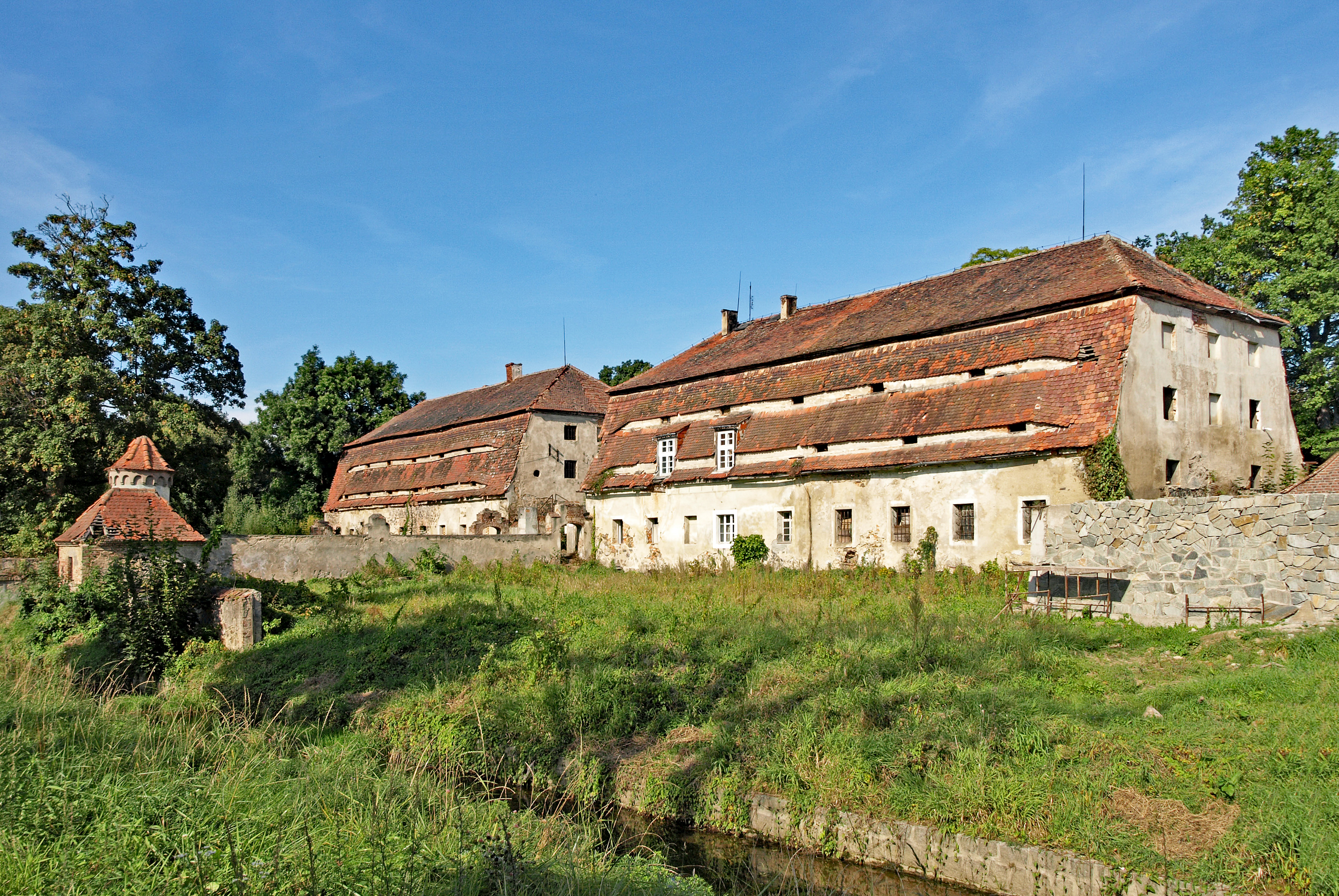

- Location within Poland
- Coordinates: 51°04′43″N 15°09′08″E
- Country: Poland
- Voivodeship: Lower Silesian
- County: Lubań
- Gmina: Platerówka

Włosień [ˈvwɔɕɛɲ] is a village in the administrative district of Gmina Platerówka, within Lubań County, Lower Silesian Voivodeship, in south-western Poland.
