= Platerówka =

- Village
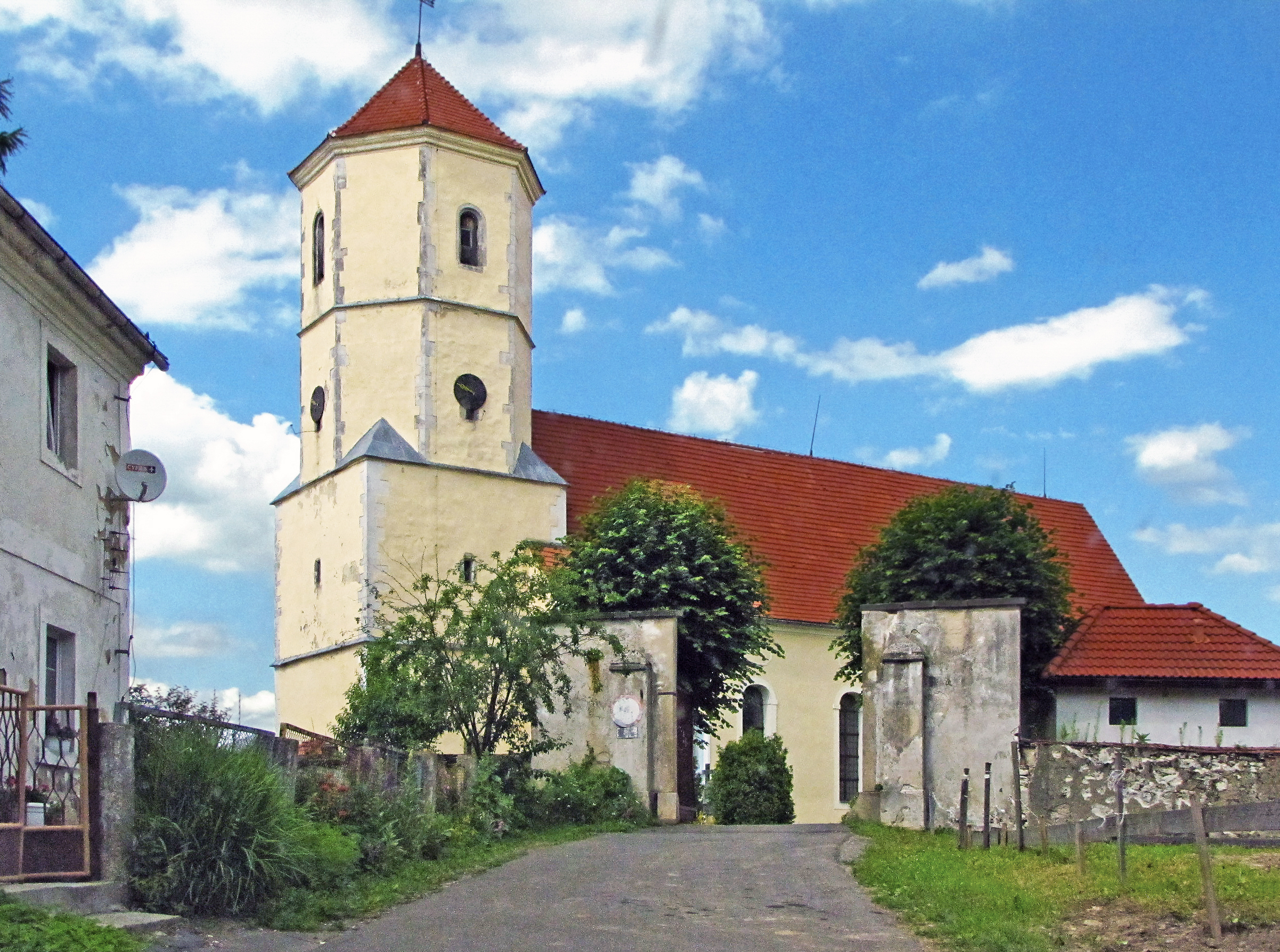
- Catholic church

- Location within Poland
- Coordinates: 51°4′N 15°11′E
- Country: Poland
- Voivodeship: Lower Silesian
- County: Lubań
- Gmina: Platerówka
- Population: 580

Platerówka ([platɛˈrufka]) (German: Nieder Linde) is a village in Lubań County, Lower Silesian Voivodeship, in south-western Poland. It is the seat of the administrative district (gmina) called Gmina Platerówka.

The name Platerówka comes from the name of the Emilia Plater Independent Women's Battalion (of the Polish I Corps in the Soviet Union), whose soldiers were settled in the village following World War II.
