= Plater coat of arms =

Polish coat of arms

Plater
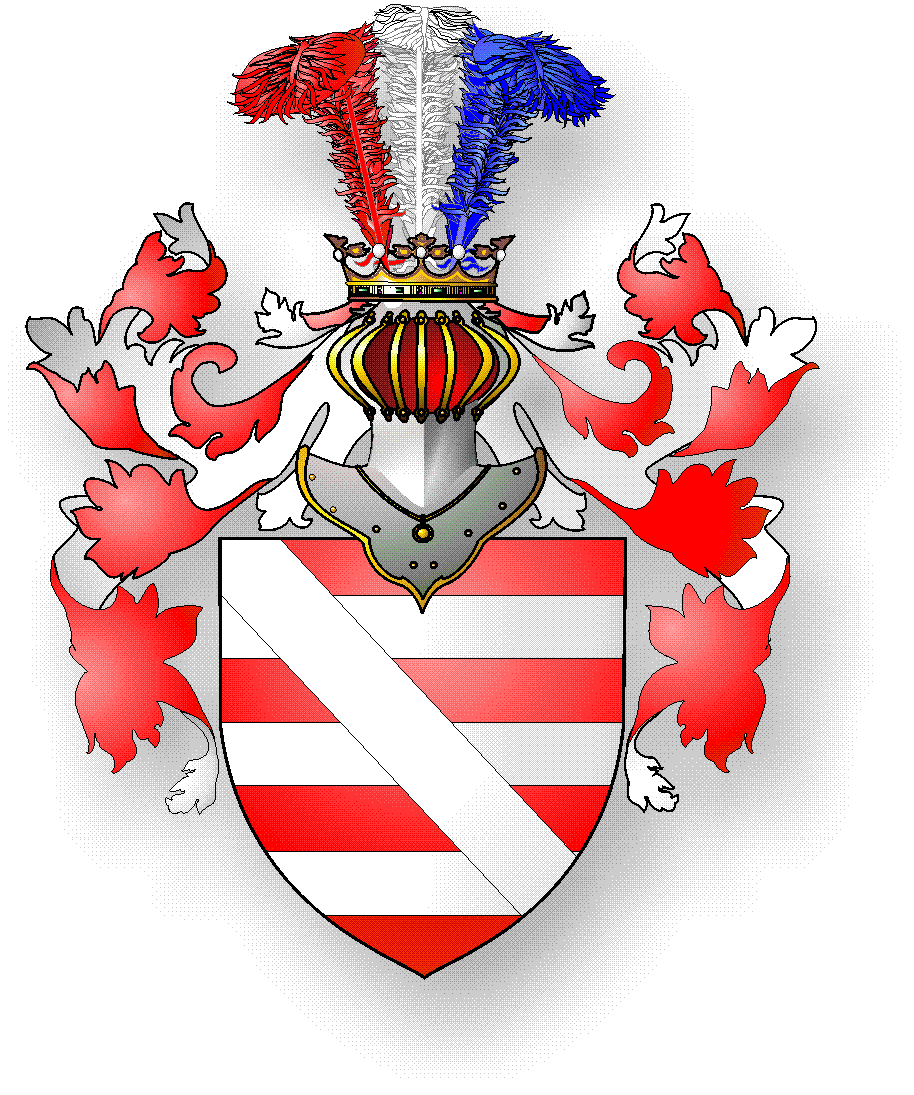
- Towns: none
- Families: Plater

Plater coat of arms is a Polish coat of arms. It was used by several szlachta families in the times of the Kingdom of Poland and the Polish–Lithuanian Commonwealth, most notably by the Plater family.

== Notable bearers ==
Its most famous bearer was Emilia Plater, a Polish-Lithuanian heroine of the November uprising.
