= Platers =

Platers may refer to the following Canadian junior ice hockey teams:

- Guelph Platers
- Owen Sound Platers

See also:

- The Platters a successful vocal group of the early rock and roll era
