= Zalipie, Lower Silesian Voivodeship =

Zalipie
- Village
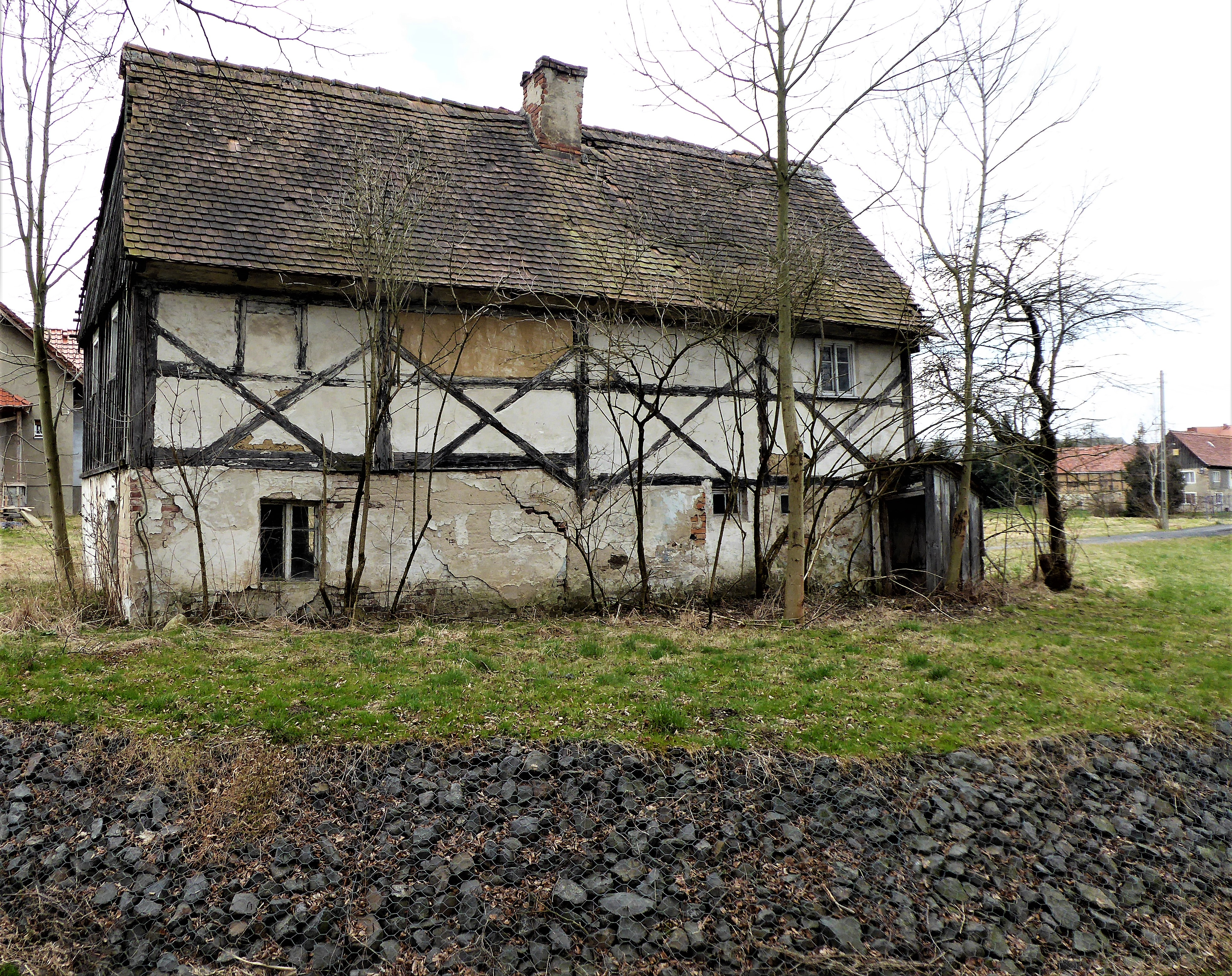

- Location within Poland
- Coordinates: 51°03′N 15°11′E
- Country: Poland
- Voivodeship: Lower Silesian
- County: Lubań
- Gmina: Platerówka

Zalipie [zaˈlipjɛ] is a village in the administrative district of Gmina Platerówka, within Lubań County, Lower Silesian Voivodeship, in south-western Poland.
