= Gmina Platerówka =

Gmina Platerówka Platerówka Commune
- Gmina
- Interactive map of Gmina Platerówka
- Coordinates (Platerówka): 51°4′N 15°11′E
- Country: Poland
- Voivodeship: Lower Silesian
- County: Lubań
- Seat: Platerówka
- Sołectwos: Platerówka, Włosień, Zalipie

Area
  - Total: 47.94 km^{2} (18.51 sq mi)

Population (2019-06-30)
  - Total: 1,631
  - Density: 34.02/km^{2} (88.12/sq mi)
- Website: http://www.gminaplaterowka.pl/

Gmina Platerówka is a rural gmina (administrative district) in Lubań County, Lower Silesian Voivodeship, in south-western Poland, on the Czech border. Its seat is the village of Platerówka, which lies approximately 10 kilometres (6 mi) south-west of Lubań, and 130 kilometres (81 mi) west of the regional capital Wrocław.

The gmina covers an area of 47.94 square kilometres (18.5 sq mi), and as of 2019 its total population is 1,631.

== Neighbouring gminas ==
Gmina Platerówka is bordered by the town of Lubań and the gminas of Leśna, Lubań, Siekierczyn and Sulików. It also borders the Czech Republic.

== Villages ==
The gmina contains the villages of Platerówka, Przylasek, Włosień and Zalipie.
