= Józefa Rostkowska =

Participant in the November Uprising

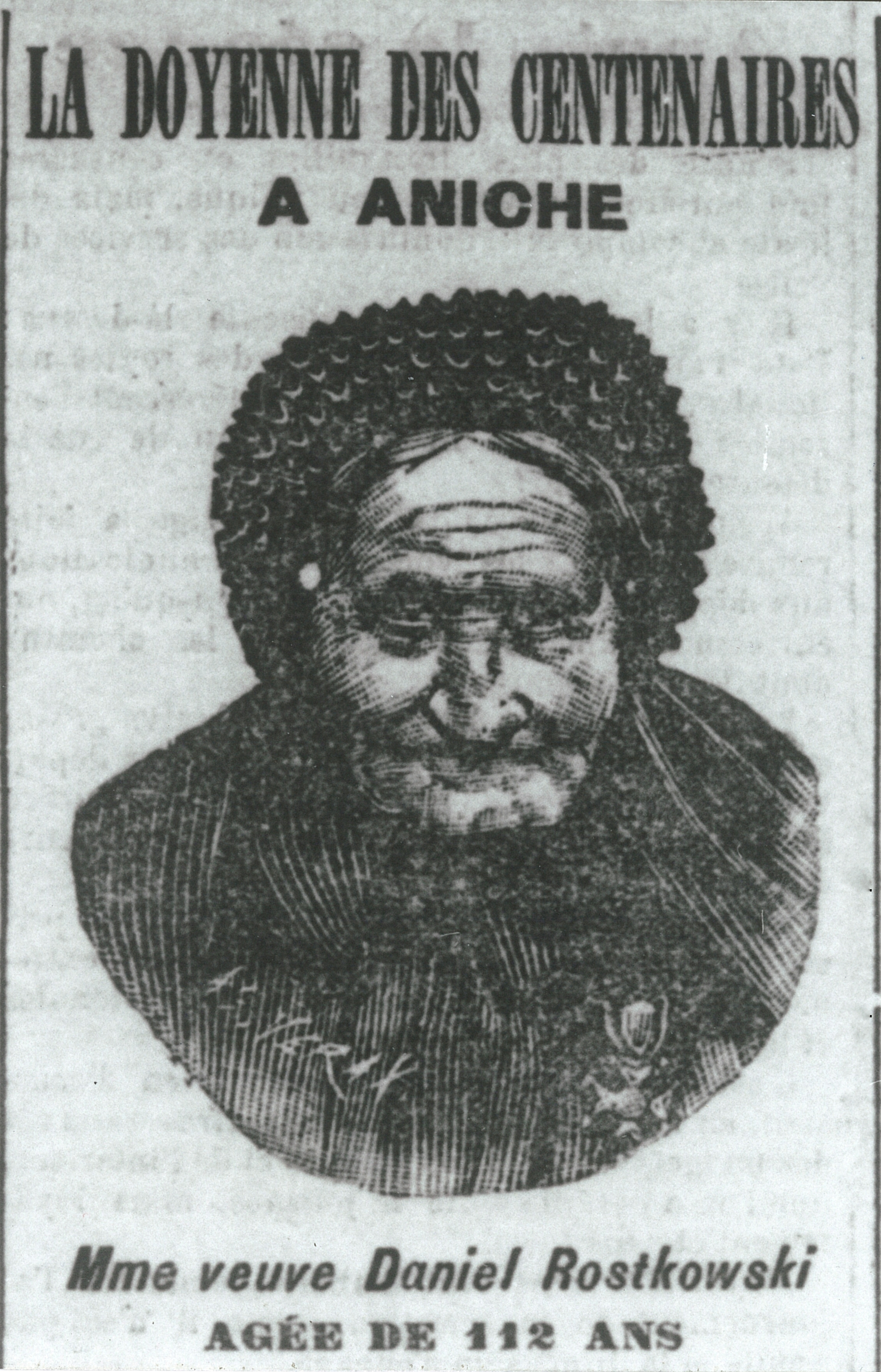
- Born: 19 March 1784; Warsaw, Masovian Voivodeship, Polish–Lithuanian Commonwealth
- Died: 18 July 1896 (aged 112); Aniche, Nord, French Third Republic
- Other name: Józef Kluczycki
- Military career
- Allegiance: National Government; Ottoman Empire
- Service years: 1830-31; 1853-1856
- Battles: Białołęka; Dębe Wielkie; Ostrołęka
- Awards: Virtuti Militari; Order of the Medjidie

Józefa Rostkowska (1784–1896), was a Polish cross-dresser who participated in the November Uprising against Russia under the nom de guerre Józef Kluczycki. She served as a nurse both in the uprising of 1830 as well as during the Crimean War.

== Biography ==
Rostkowska was born in Warsaw on 19 March 1784. During the November Uprising she enlisted in the military, using the surname of her deceased husband, as Józef Kluczycki. She participated in several battles including those at Białołęka, Dębe Wielkie, and Ostrołęka. In her seventies she served as a nurse for the Ottomans during the Crimean War under the command of the Polish muslim Sadyk Pasha. Rostkowska died in Aniche on 18 July 1896, aged 112.

== Bibliography ==
- Henri Musielak, Polonica w Archiwum Północnej Francji w Lille. Archeion, t. LXII, 1975.
