= Plater family =

German noble family

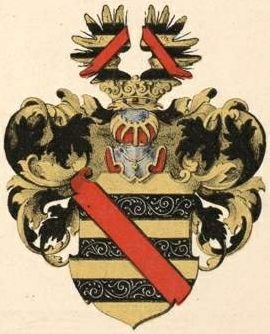
Original von dem Broel genannt Plater coat of arms

Coat of arms of Plater-Zyberk

The Plater family is an old, originally German noble family belonging to the uradel (ancient nobility) and tracing its roots to Westphalia. Its members later spread to Livonia and then to the Grand Duchy of Lithuania and the Crown of the Kingdom of Poland, joining the Baltic German, Lithuanian, and Polish nobilities.

The Platers returned to Catholicism in the 17th century and held high offices in the Polish-Lithuanian Commonwealth and achieved magnate status in the 18th century, with six representatives of the family achieving a seat in the Senate. The basis of the family's importance in Polish Livonia was the uninterrupted holding of the post of starosta in Dyneburg since 1670.

== History ==
=== Origins and family name ===
The family was first documented in 1274 with knight Hinricus de Broyle and later in 1392 with Rötger von dem Broel genannt Plater. Their original seat was Broel in County of Mark, hence the family's name was von dem Broel. The part of the family that moved in 15th century to Livonia used the name Plater or the combined name Broel-Plater.

The Plater-Zyberk branch line was founded by Michał Plater-Zyberk, who married Izabela Helena Syberg zu Wischling (1785–1849), daughter of Jan Tadeusz Syberg zu Wischling, the last male representative of the House of Syberg, German uradel noble family also hailing from the County of Mark. In order to save his wife's family name, he adopted her surname and the coat of arms.

The ancestor of the Plater family, which stemmed from Livonia, was Fryderyk Plater (ca. 1465- ca. 1533), who, together with his brother Jan, acquired the Weissensee and Nidritz (Indryca, now Lielindrica) estates in Livonia.

Jan, Fryderyk's son, established a line of the family, which divided into branches of the Weissensee and Könhof (now Keeni) heirlooms. These estates came under Swedish and later Russian rule.

Fryderyk's second son Henryk inherited Nidritz. His son, also Henryk (II), supported the transfer of Livonia to Poland in 1561. His son Henryk (III) from his marriage with Maria von Knorr had three sons: Henryk (IV), Gotard Jan and Jan Wilhelm.

Jan Wilhelm gave rise to the Samogitian line of the family, while Gotard Jan gave rise to the Livonian line.

=== Samogitian line ===
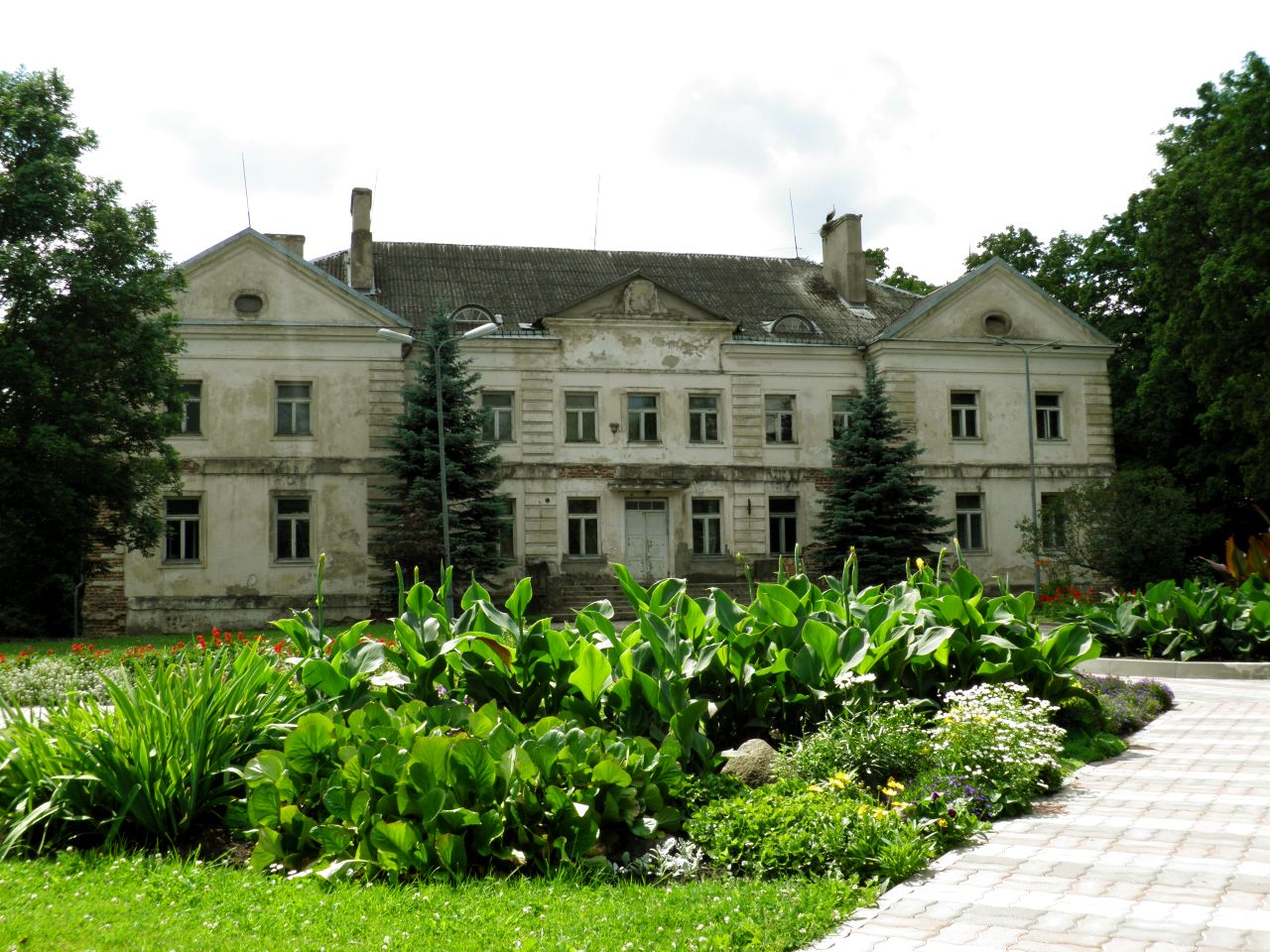
Antazavė Manor

Jan Wilhelm (d. 1664) converted to Catholicism under the influence of his second wife Jadwiga Naruszewicz. He owned estates in Livonia and Samogitia.

One of his grandsons Jan Wilhelm (1676–1757) was a diplomat, from his second marriage to Princess Helena Ogińska (1694–1739) he had a son Wilhelm Jan (d. 1769).

Wilhelm Jan inherited his parents' estates: Ozolmuiža, Antazavė, Šateikiai, and others, and also acquired Švėkšna (Szweksznie) in Samogitia. From his marriage to Petronela Nagórska (1720–1790), he had two sons Józef Antoni and Jerzy, who started branches of the family in Dąbrowica and Švėkšna.

==== Dąbrowica branch ====
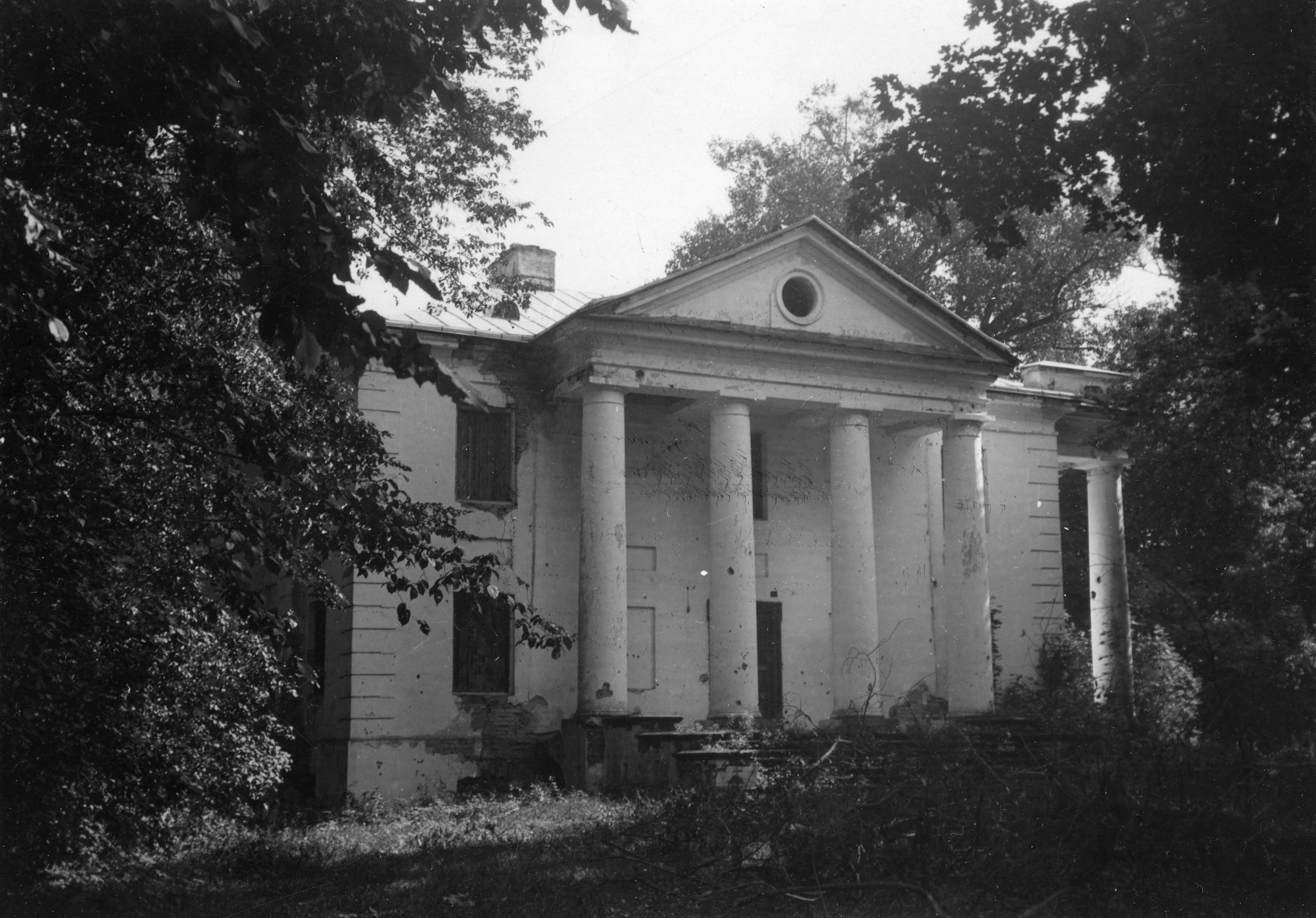
Photo of the non-existent Plater manor in Worobin, near Dubrovytsia, owned by Dąbrowica branch of the Plater family, Rivne Oblast, Ukraine, taken before 1939

Józef Antoni Plater (1750–1832), acquired Dubrovytsia and Worobin estates in Brest Litovsk Voivodeship, and Pulma and Zahordzie in Volhynia. His only heir was Ignacy Wilhelm Plater (1791–1854), who obtained the Belmont and Bohiń estates in the Vilnius region from his sister Konstancja, the widow of Count Stanisław Manuzzi. He also obtained confirmation of the title of count in the Russian Empire for himself and the entire Plater family. One of his sons was Włodzimierz Stanisław Plater, a historian and bibliophile, owner of a valuable library, which he housed in the castle in Wiśniowiec. Second son Konstanty (1828–1886) was an architect, took part in the January Uprising, due to which he lost his property, was exiled to Siberia, then settled in Austria. His sons died childless.

Third son Wiktor (1843–1911) inherited his father and brother Wlodzimierz's estates in Volhynia, Dabrowica and Pulma. With Helena Potocka he had three sons. Two of them, Ignacy and Antoni, were murdered in November 1918 by revolutionaries. The only survivor was Witold (1893–1962), who inherited all the family's property, but settled in Osiecz Wielki near Włocławek. He was one of the largest landowners in interwar Poland. Witold had eight children, two sons died in the Warsaw Uprising. After the war the family lived in Wrocław.

==== Szweksznie branch ====
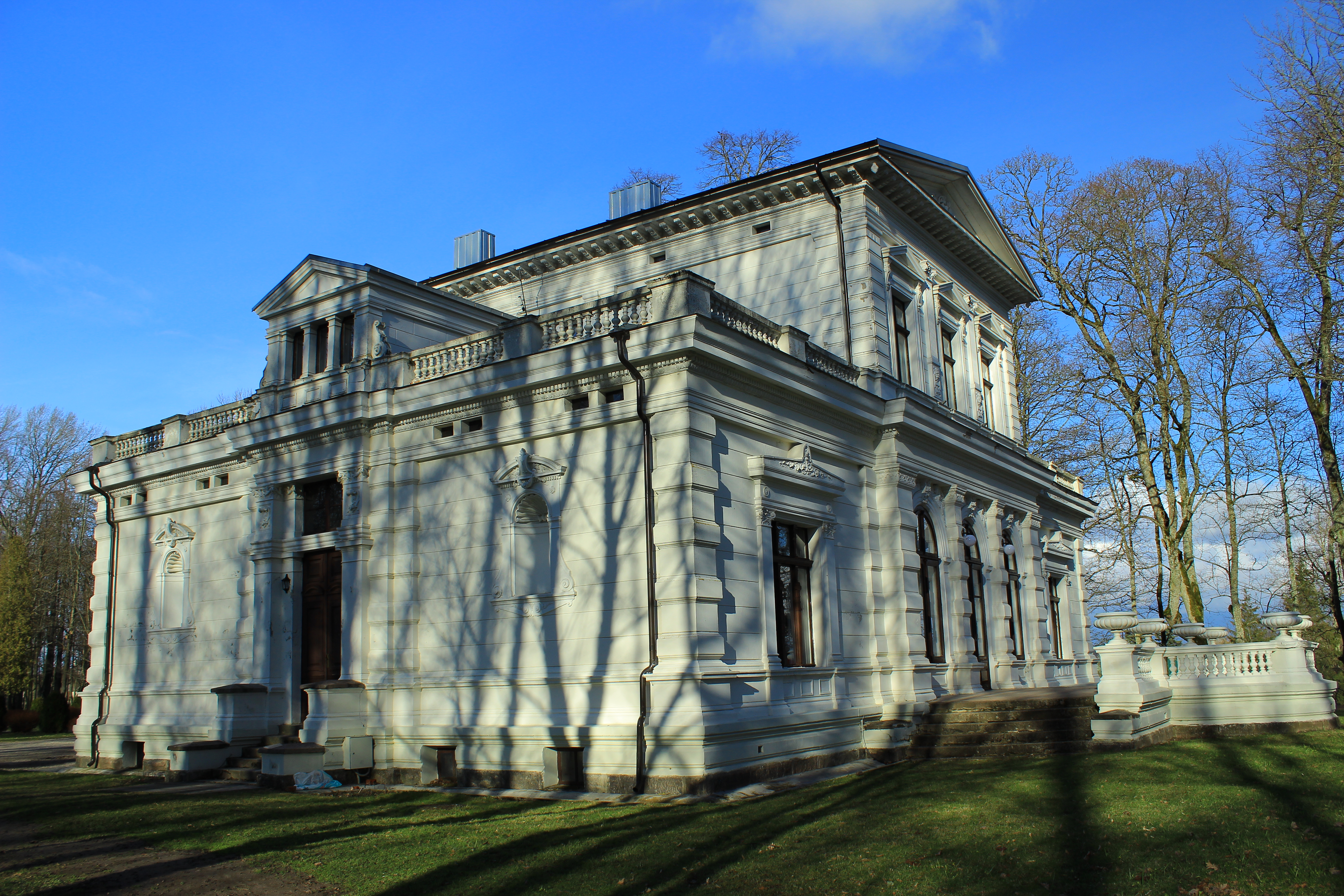
Villa Genofefa, owned by the Szweksznie branch of the Plater family, Šilutė District, Lithuania

Szweksznie branch was founded by George (died before 1825), the second son of Wilhelm Jan, owner of Švėkšna Manor, Kartena, Šateikiai and other estates in Samogitia. It had three sons. Jerzy, who died young, was a historian and bibliophile. Franciszek (1798–1867) inherited Šateikiai and had many children, but no male grandchildren. Stefan inherited Švėkšna and took over, along with the hand of Alina Żaba-Marcinkiewicz, the entire estate of the Żaba family. He had sons Gustaw Wilhelm (1841–1912) a composer, and Adam Alfred (1836–1908), an archaeologist, president of the Vilnius Land Bank, and a political loyalist.

Adam Alfred's older son was Marian (1873–1951) also a bibliophile and president of the Vilnius Land Bank. Marian had three sons, of whom Kazimierz Plater was a chess champion. Adam Alfred's younger son was Jerzy, last owner of Švėkšna, lived in the interwar Lithuania after World War I, and died on exile in Soviet Union in 1943. His son was Aleksandras Plateris, Lithuanian historian and writer.

=== Livonian line ===
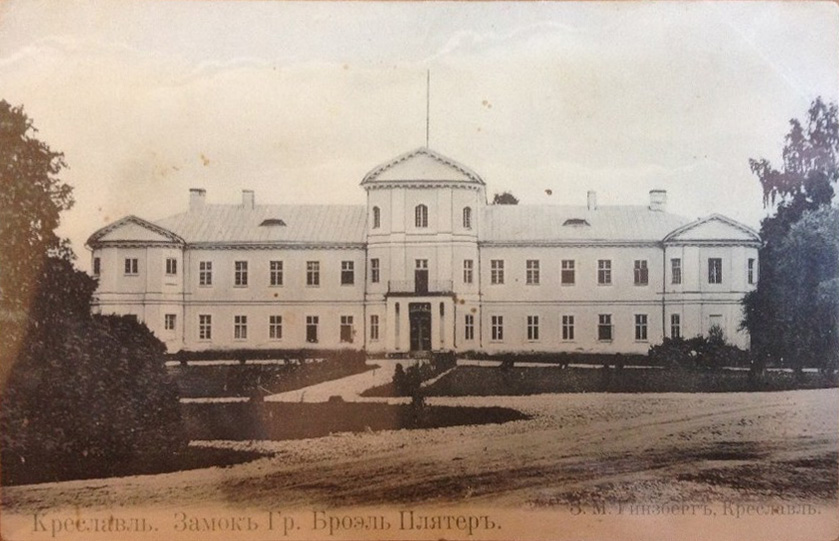
Krāslava castle, owned by the Livonian line of the Plater family, Krāslava, Krāslava Municipality, Latgale, Lithuania

Gotard Jan Plater (d. 1664) was a major and military officer, and owned landed estates in Livonia (Indryca, Varnaviči) and Antonosze in Vilnius voivodeship. He had three sons who attained high magnate positions in the Commonwealth. The most powerful position was held by the youngest of the brothers, Jan Andrzej Plater (d. 1696), starosta of Livonia and Dyneburg, who, after accepting the Catholic faith in 1695, was able to become the first of the family to hold the senatorial office of Voivode of Livonia. Teofil Plater (d. 1697) was a diplomat and deputy, and at the end of his life converted to Catholicism. Along with him, the second of the brothers, Fabian (d. 1709), did so, becoming Voivode of Livonia.

Jan Andrzej's son was Jan Ludwik (d. 1736), also an Voivode of Livonia, and a buyer of Krāslava and Kombuļi, the main estates of the Plater family. His son Konstanty Ludwik (1722–1788), Castellan of Trakai, increased the family's wealth by acquiring estates in Volhynia and Ukraine through his marriage to Princess Augusta Ogińska (1724–1791). His heir was his son August Hiacynt (c.1755-1803), who further expanded his estate through marriage to Countess Anna Rzewuska (1761–1800). He himself had nine children.

==== Krasław and Kombul branches ====
The heir of Krāslava was Adam Antoni (1790–1862), a polyhistor; after his death and that of his sons, the estate passed to the Szweksznie line. Kombuļi was inherited by Józef Kazimierz (1796–1852), who had 14 children, including seven daughters. Among them was Leon Joachim Plater. (1836–1863), who died during the January Uprising taking it upon himself to organize an attack on Russian troops, thus protecting Zygmunt Bujnicki, the actual commander and father of a large family. The only one of Leon Joachim's sons to marry was Michał Hieronim (1834–1924), heir to Kombuļi, who had two sons, both of whom left no offspring. Józef (1890–1941) fought in the French and Polish armies during World War I, and died in a German concentration camp in 1940. Leon Plater, on the other hand, was ordained a priest and was chaplain to the Polish Air Force and President Władysław Raczkiewicz during World War II.

== Notable members of the family ==
- Gotard Jan Plater (d. 1664) – militaryman
- Jan Andrzej Plater (1626–1696) – voivode of Livonia
- Ferdinand Fabian Plater (1678–1739) – Court Marshal of Lithuania
- Jan Ludwik Plater (d. 1736) – voivode of Inflanty
- Konstanty Ludwik Plater (1722–1778) – voivode of Mstislavl
- August Hiacynt Plater (1745–1803) – marshal of the Targowica Confederation
- Józef Wincenty Plater (1745–1806) – field notary of Lithuania
- Kazimierz Konstanty Plater (1749–1807) – starosta
- Jerzy Konstanty Plater (1810–1836) – bibliographer
- Ludwik August Plater (1775–1846) – insurgent of the Kościuszko Insurrection
- Konstanty Plater (1778–1849) – marshal of nobility
- Stanisław Plater (1784–1851) – officer, historian, geographer
- Adam Antoni Plater (1790–1862) – landowner, polymath, zoologist
- Emilia Plater (1806–1831) – officer of the November Uprising
- Lucjan Stanisław Plater (1808–1857) – November Uprising insurgent
- Michał Plater-Zyberk (1777–1862) – naturalist
- Henryk Ludwik Plater (1817–1868) – clergyman
- Leon Plater (1836–1863) – insurgent of the January Uprising, executed in Dyneburg
- Władysław Plater (1808–1889) – founder of the Polish National Museum in Rapperswil
- Ludwik Kazimierz Plater (1844–1909) – landowner, industrialist, economic activist
- Adam Alfred Plater (1836–1909) – archaeologist, marshal of the nobility
- Cecylia Plater-Zyberk (1853–1920) – social activist, educator and publicist.
- Zygmunt Plater-Zyberk (1901–1978) – architect
- Kazimierz Plater (1915–2004) – chess player
- Elizabeth Plater-Zyberk (b. 1950) – architect and urban planner

== Bibliography ==
- Wróbel, Łukasz (2018). "Hylzenowie, Platerowie i Tyzenhauzowie. Szlachta inflancka i jej rola w życiu politycznym osiemnastowiecznej Rzeczypospolitej" [The Hylzen family, the Plater family and the Tyzenhauz family. The Livonian nobility and its role in the political life of the eighteenth-century Polish-Lithuanian Commonwealth]. Res Gestae. 6.
- Zielińska, Teresa (1997). Poczet polskich rodów arystokratycznych [Polish aristocratic families] (in Polish). Wydawnictwa Szkolne i Pedagogiczne. ISBN 8302064297.
