= Castaldi =

Castaldi is a surname. Notable people with the surname include:

- Alfa Castaldi (1926–1995), Italian photographer
- Bellerofonte Castaldi (1580–1649), Italian composer, poet and lutenist
- Benjamin Castaldi (born 1970), French television host, columnist, radio host and producer
- Ettore Castaldi (1877–1956), Italian painter
- Filippo Castaldi (circa 1710–1785), Italian portrait painter
- Gerolamo Castaldi (died 1521), Roman Catholic prelate who served as Bishop of Massa Lubrense
- Ian Castaldi Paris, Maltese politician
- Jean-Pierre Castaldi (born 1944), French actor
- Luigi Castaldi (1890–1945), Italian anatomist
- María Itatí Castaldi (born 1966), Argentine basketball player
- Panfilo Castaldi (c. 1398 – c. 1490), Italian physician and master of the art of printing
- Vincenzo Castaldi (1916–1970), Italian chess master

== See also ==
- Castaldo
