= Caputi =

Caputi is an Italian surname. Notable people with the surname include:

- Adriano Baracchini Caputi (1883–1968), Italian painter
- Federico Caputi (1950–2025), Italian football player
- Luca Caputi (born 1988), Canadian ice hockey player and coach
- Tammy Caputi, American politician

== See also ==
- Caputo
