= Caputo =

Caputo is a common Italian surname. It derives from the Latin root of caput, meaning "source" or "head" - words with similar roots include "chapter", "capital", or "captain". People with that name include:

- Andrea Caputo, Italian Catholic prelate
- Anthony "Acid" Caputo, American DJ, producer and remixer
- Bruce Faulkner Caputo, American politician
- Chuck Caputo, American politician
- Dante Caputo, Argentine academic, politician and diplomat
- David A. Caputo, American academic
- Denis Caputo, Argentine footballer
- Francesco Caputo, Italian footballer
- Francesco Caputo. Italian painter
- Frank Caputo, Canadian politician
- John D. Caputo, American philosopher
- Joseph Claude Caputo, American jazz musician, known as Joe Cabot
- Keith Caputo, formerly known as Mina Caputo, American singer
- Lisa Caputo, American businesswoman
- Luis Caputo, Argentine economist and politician
- Michael A. Caputo, American football player
- Michael R. Caputo, Republican political strategist and media consultant
- Michael "Mike" Caputo, American politician
- Nicola Caputo (born 1966), Italian politician
- Pat Caputo, American sportswriter and broadcaster
- Philip Caputo, American writer and journalist
- Ricardo Caputo, Argentine criminal
- Sergio Caputo, Italian musician
- Theresa Caputo, American television personality
- Tony C. Caputo, American publisher
- Lisa Nowak (née Caputo), American naval aviator and astronaut

== Fictional characters ==
- Joe Caputo, the fictional Litchfield Director of Human Activities on Orange is the New Black
