= Krāslava New Palace =

Palace in Latvia

Krāslava Palace
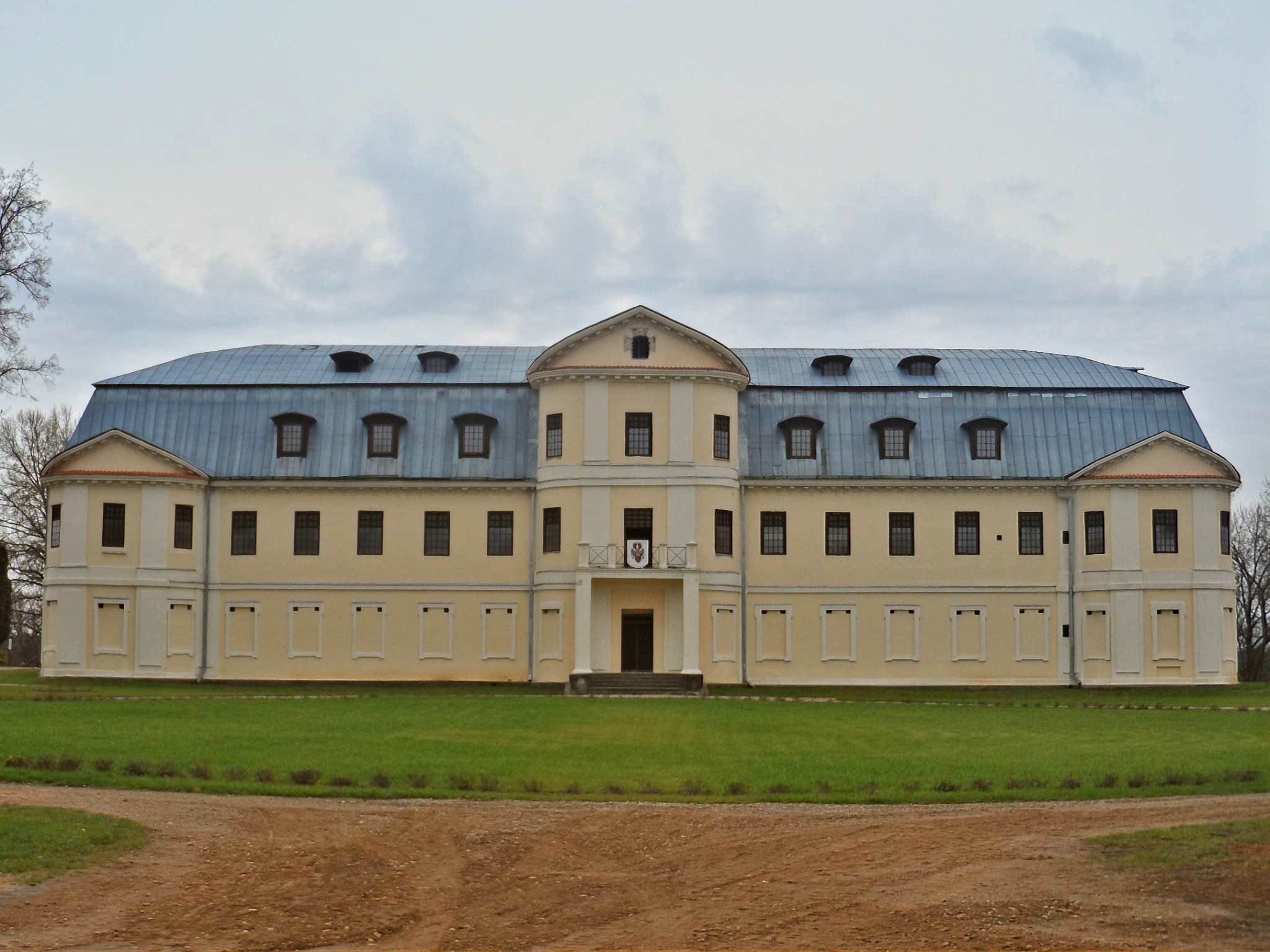

- Location within Latvia

General information
- Architectural style: Baroque
- Location: Krāslava, Latvia
- Coordinates: 55°53′58″N 27°9′35″E
- Construction started: 1760s
- Completed: 1791
- Client: Konstanty Ludwik Plater

Design and construction
- Architect: Antonio Paracca

Krāslava New Palace or Plater's Palace (Latvian: Krāslavas jaunā pils; Polish: Pałac Platerów w Krasławiu) is located in the historical region of Latgale, in eastern Latvia. It is an 18th-century manor ensemble with main manor house and other manor buildings and a Baroque-style park.

== History ==
From 1553, the noble Plater family owned the Indrica Manor. In 1729 Jan Ludwik Plater, starosta of Daugavpils and later at the voivode of Inflanty (1735-1736) bought Krāslava, formerly property of Wolff von Lüdinghausen. His son Konstanty Ludwik Plater (1722-1778) married daughter of Prince August Ogiński and around 1750 began building a two-story stone building with a mansard roof near the ruins of the Kraslava Order Castle on the Theater Hill. Contraction was completed in 1791 by his youngest son, August Hyacint Plater. It is speculated that the Baroque-style palace project may have been designed by Jan Valentin Didreišten, architect of the Kraslava Town Hall, or was designed in collaboration with Antonio Paroko, architect of the Kraslava Roman Catholic Church.

In 1824 the building was rebuilt according to the canons of classicism. Next to the palace were also other manor buildings: steward's and gardener's house, canaries, stable, ice cellars, orangery. Around the New Palace on the slopes of the Daugava valley was established a landscape park of approximately 22 ha.

Following the October Revolution in Russian Empire, during 1917-1919 Plater's palace was plundered and damaged. Count Gustav Christoph Plater, the last owner of the estate, died in Riga in 1923, and his wife, Mary Plater, emigrated to Spain, where she died in 1949. In 1923 the Kraslava Gymnasium was opened in the nationalized palace. The first Gymnasium director was Valery Salem. In 1944, the school was renamed Kraslava Secondary School No. 1, started training in field of manufacturing, and set up workshops in the old stables of the manor to teach mechanics. In 1972 the 1st Secondary School was moved from the old palace to building on 25 Raiņa Street, which was built in 1964 for the 2nd Secondary School.

In 1984, exploration of the interior walls resulted in the discovery of ancient palace wall paintings. Currently, the Kraslava Museum of History and Art operates in the territory of the manor complex. At the end of 2011, with the support of the European Regional Development Fund, the historical appearance of the Kraslava Manor Park was restored according to the 1824 plan. The park's pond has been cleaned, walking paths have been set up along the park's terraces and in the courtyard of the palace, and new stairs have been built in their historical place.

After the renovation, the former palace stables are home to the "House of Crafts", where various events are held.

== See also ==
- List of palaces and manor houses in Latvia
