= Krāslava Old Palace =

Palace in Latvia

- Latgale, Latvia
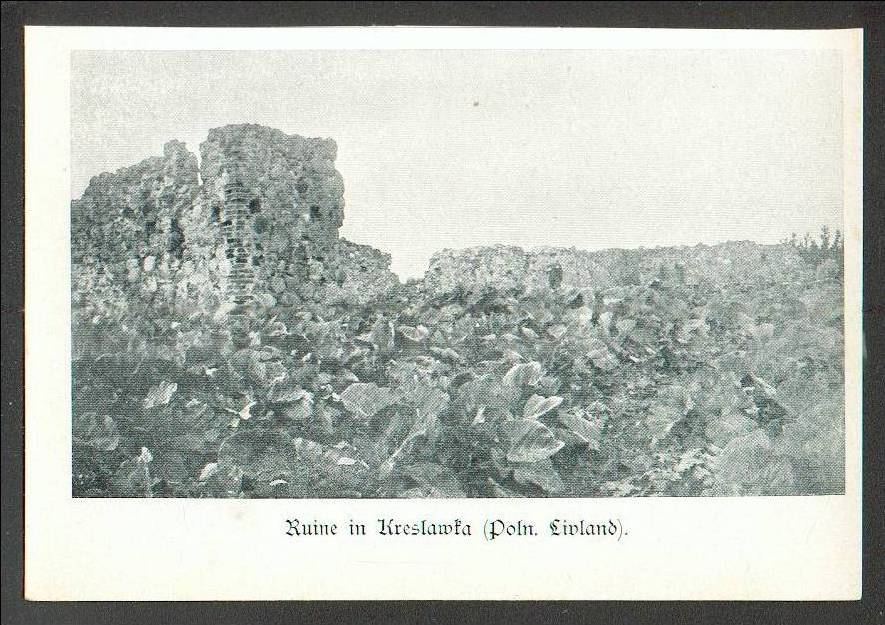
- Ruins of Krāslava Old Palace in 1914

Site information
- Type: Palace
- Condition: ruins

Location
- Coordinates: 55°54′07″N 27°08′55″E

Krāslava Old Palace (Latvian: Krāslavas vecā pils, German: Kreslawka, Polish: Kraslaw) was a Krāslava Manor house in the historical region of Latgale, in eastern Latvia. Only barely visible ruins remaining. The building housed the Plater family library after the construction of their new palace.

== History ==
The hillfort on the waterway Düna - Dnepr, was already inhabited in the 9th century. In the sagas of the Vikings the place appears as "Dynasaiforgarðr", one of the settlements in Garðaríki.

The Livonian Brothers of the Sword took the place in 1209. However, Duke of Jersika Visvaldis got the place back as a fief.

The year when the castle was built is unknown, but it is mentioned in documents in 1558, when the Master of the Livonian Order Johann Wilhelm von Fürstenberg dedicated it to his vassal Engelbrecht Plumper.

During the Livonian War, Kraslava was captured by Russian troops. Kraslava Castle was not mentioned in the 1582 Truce of Yam-Zapolsky, later after the conclusion of the treaty the Krāslava castle district was included in the territory of Duchy of Livonia. In 1626 Kraslava Manor was bought by von Lüdinghausen-Wolff's family, then it belonged to Čapsky. In 1729, Jan Ludwik Plater bought Kraslava for 1400 thalers, and Plater family owned Kraslava for the next two centuries.

== See also ==
- List of palaces and manor houses in Latvia
