= Castaldo =

Castaldo is a surname. Notable people with the surname include:

- Alfonso Castaldo (1890–1966), Italian Roman Catholic cardinal
- Joseph Castaldo (1927–2000), American composer
- Matteo Castaldo (born 1985), Italian rower

== See also ==
- Castaldi
