= Eidus =

Eidus is a surname. Notable people with the surname include:

- Khaim Eidus (1896–1972), Soviet politician, orientalist, and japanologist
- Arnold Eidus (1922–2013), American classical violinist
- Roza Eidus (1930–2018), Russian classical pianist
- Janice Eidus (born 1951), American writer
