= Baracchini =

Baracchini or Barachini is an Italian surname. Notable people with this name include the following:

- Adriano Baracchini Caputi (1883–1968), Italian painter
- Alberto Barachini (born 1972), Italian journalist and politician
- Flavio Baracchini (1895–1928), Italian World War I flying ace and inventor
- Silvio Baracchini (born 1950), Italian water polo player

== See also ==
- Palazzo Baracchini on the Quirinal Hill, Rome
