= Katrina Krumpane =

Latvian operatic soprano and vocal educator (born 1980)

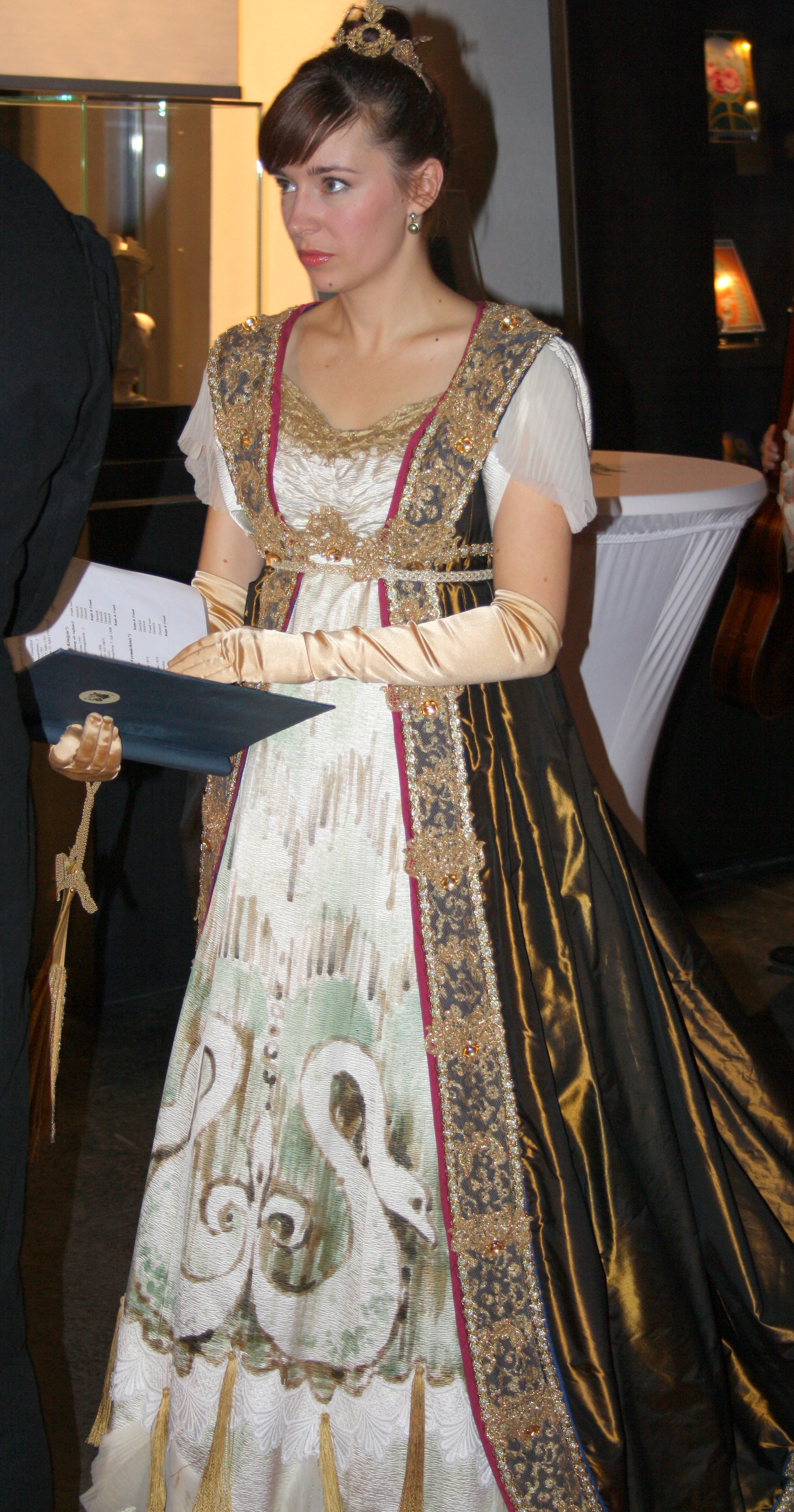
Katrina Krumpane as Königin Luise in 2010

Katrina Krumpane (Latvian: Katrīna Krumpāne; born 1 April 1980) is a Latvian operatic soprano and vocal educator. Born in Krāslava, Latvia, she has performed in Europe, Asia, and North America and has taught voice in South Korea and the United States.

== Early life and education ==
Krumpane studied singing, piano, and flute at Daugavpils Music College (Daugavpils Mūzikas koledža) in Latvia. In 1998, she won the Alexandrovsky International Vocal Competition in Belarus.

She later studied singing and music theatre at the Berlin University of the Arts. She completed her diploma with distinction in 2010 and subsequently received a Master of Arts from the university.

== Performing career ==
Krumpane made her debut at the Komische Oper Berlin in 2004 in Tom Johnson's The Four Note Opera. Her operatic and theatrical roles have included Adele in Die Fledermaus, Susanna in The Marriage of Figaro, Ännchen in Der Freischütz, Musetta in La bohème, Adina in L'elisir d'amore, Gilda in Rigoletto, Zerlina in Don Giovanni, the Bride in Les noces, Berenice in L'occasione fa il ladro, Marie in Frau Luna, and Valencienne in The Merry Widow.

In 2011, she recorded Gaspare Spontini's Lalla-Roukh with musicians from the Deutsche Oper Berlin. That year, she also made her debut at the Berlin State Opera as Hartwige in Ermanno Wolf-Ferrari's Cinderella.

In March 2022, Krumpane appeared in a concert at the Busan Cinema Center with singer Soko, performing selections including “Think of Me” from The Phantom of the Opera.

In 2026, she was among the ten singers selected from applicants representing 36 countries for the final round of KBS's Korean art-song competition K-Gagok Superstar.

== Teaching ==
Krumpane taught at Sungshin Women's University for five years and presented masterclasses at Yonsei University and Chugye University for the Arts. In 2021, she became a visiting professor at Kyung Hee University. A 2022 report described her as a visiting professor in Kyung Hee University's vocal music department.

After relocating to Silicon Valley, she founded the Institute of Voice and Performing Arts, where she works as a vocal educator and artistic director. The Charleston International Music Competition named her its Teacher of the Month for December 2024 after the competition selected several of her students as winners.
