= Antazavė Manor =

Coordinates: 55°48′30″N 25°55′38″E

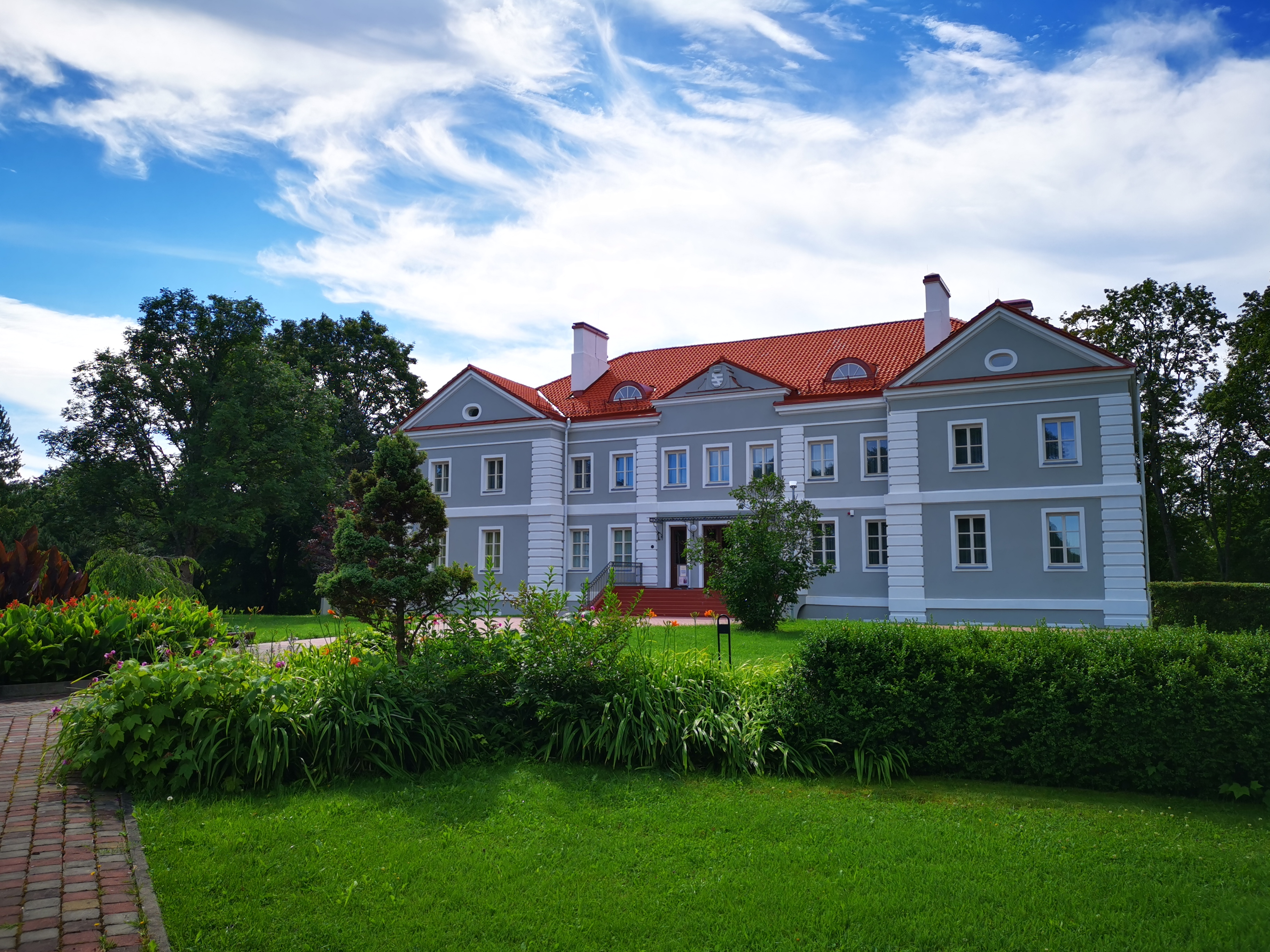
- Antazavė Manor (2022)
- Interactive map of the Antazavė Manor area

General information
- Type: Residential manor
- Location: Antazavė, Lithuania
- Current tenants: Antazavė care homes

Antazavė Manor is a residential manor in Antazavė. Currently it is occupied by Antazavė care homes. In one of the manor rooms, Stanislava Kirailytė founded Antazavė region Museum.

== History ==
=== The Radziwiłł family ===
In the 16th-17th centuries, large areas of North-Eastern Lithuania were ruled by the Biržai-Dubingiai branch of the Radziwiłł family. The land of Dusetos-Antazavė belonged to Krzysztof and Janusz Radziwiłł (1579–1620).

In 1669, after the death of Janusz's son, Bogusław Radziwiłł (1620–1669), the last representative of the Biržai-Dubingiai branch of the Radziwiłł family, the lands passed to the Broël-Plater family.

=== The Broël-Plater Family ===
The Broël-Platers were of German descent: their great-grandfather was a Knight of the Livonian Order. In 1729, Aleksander Konstantin Broël-Plater became the owner of the manor.

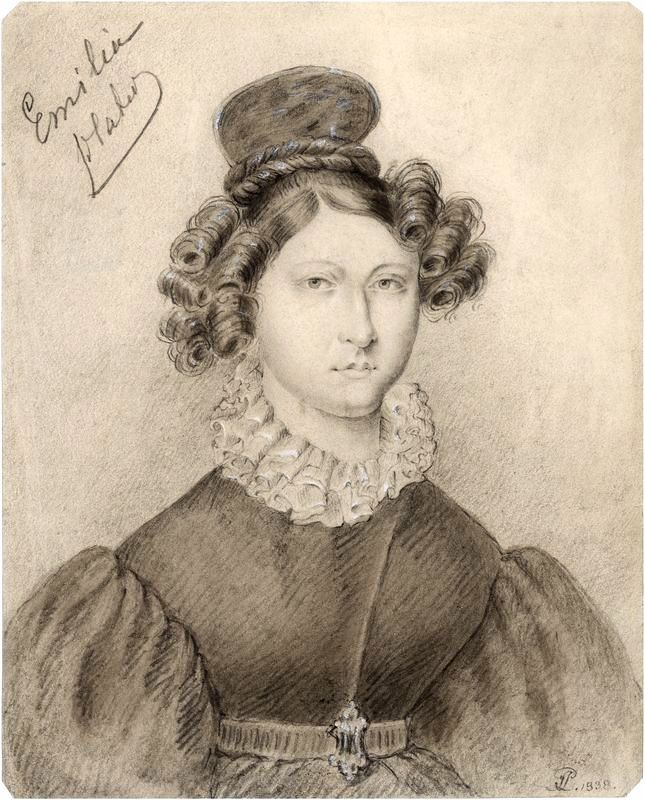
Emilia Broël-Plater

In 1748 Jan Ludwik Broël-Plater (1720–1764) and his wife Emerencja (c1730-177), the landowners of Dusetos-Antazavė, started building a manor designed by Laurynas Gucevičius. It was established on the northern shore of Lake Zalve. A three-story white palace building was built. A stone barn, cellar and stables were also constructed. A park (5 ha) was planted on the foothills of Lake Zalve, which leads to the lake from the terraces. An oval flower garden was installed on the main side of the palace facade, surrounded by a wide path, and two ponds were dug a little further and a bridge connecting them was built.

After Jan and Emerencja's son, Count Ludwig Broël-Plater's (c1740-1787) died, his wife Kunegunda (née Wollowicz) (1760–1847) built the church, rectory and hospital in Antazavė. It is estimated that the parish probably had about 4,000 people.

Count Ludwig Broël-Plater had three sons: Francis Xavier (1785–1837), Michael (b.c1760) and Caspar (1787–1829). In 1788 the manor was owned by Caspar Broël-Plater. Francis Xavier Broël-Plater was married to Countess Anna Mohl of Imbrado.

Francis Xavier Broël-Plater and Countess Anna Mohl had a daughter, Emilia Broël-Plater (1806–1831). It was in Antazavė Manor that on 25 March 1831 Emilia Broël-Plater signed a statement announcing her decision to join the rebels in the November Uprising.

=== The von Ropp Family ===
Casper's daughter Ludwika married into the Ledóchowski family, while her daughter Ludwika married Julius von Ropp. At the beginning of the 19th century, the translator Ludwiga von Ropp lived in the manor. Ludwiga von Ropp, a descendant of Broël-Platers, was the first translator of the Brothers Grimm's fairy tales from German into Lithuanian. In 1908, she published a book of fairy tales under the pseudonym Grandma.

The last owner of the manor before WWI was Elžbieta Ledochovska von Ropp.

=== World War I ===
In 1915, the German occupying army established a commandant's office in the manor, collecting horses and dairy products from the residents.

After the German withdrawal in December 1918, a Revolutionary Committee was established in the manor.

=== The Interwar Period ===
After the 1922 Land Reforms, only about 160 ha of land remained in the manor. In 1923, after the distribution of the land taken from the manor to volunteers and landless people, a new village-Šapalai appeared in the vicinity of Antazavė. In 1925 the palace was renovated and rooms were decorated.

In 1936 part of the manor archive was taken to Poland (this was taken care of by Archbishop Eduard von Ropp).

In 1937 the palace roof burned.

Antazavė Manor contained a large collection of valuable paintings, which were hidden in 1940. To this day, the fate of the paintings is unknown.

=== The Soviet Era ===
In 1940, after the nationalization of the manor, the remaining archive of documents was burned down. The last landlords Elžbieta and Nikolai Voinarovsky were deported to Siberia on 14 June 1941.

After the Second World War, the building housed an orphanage.

=== Independence ===
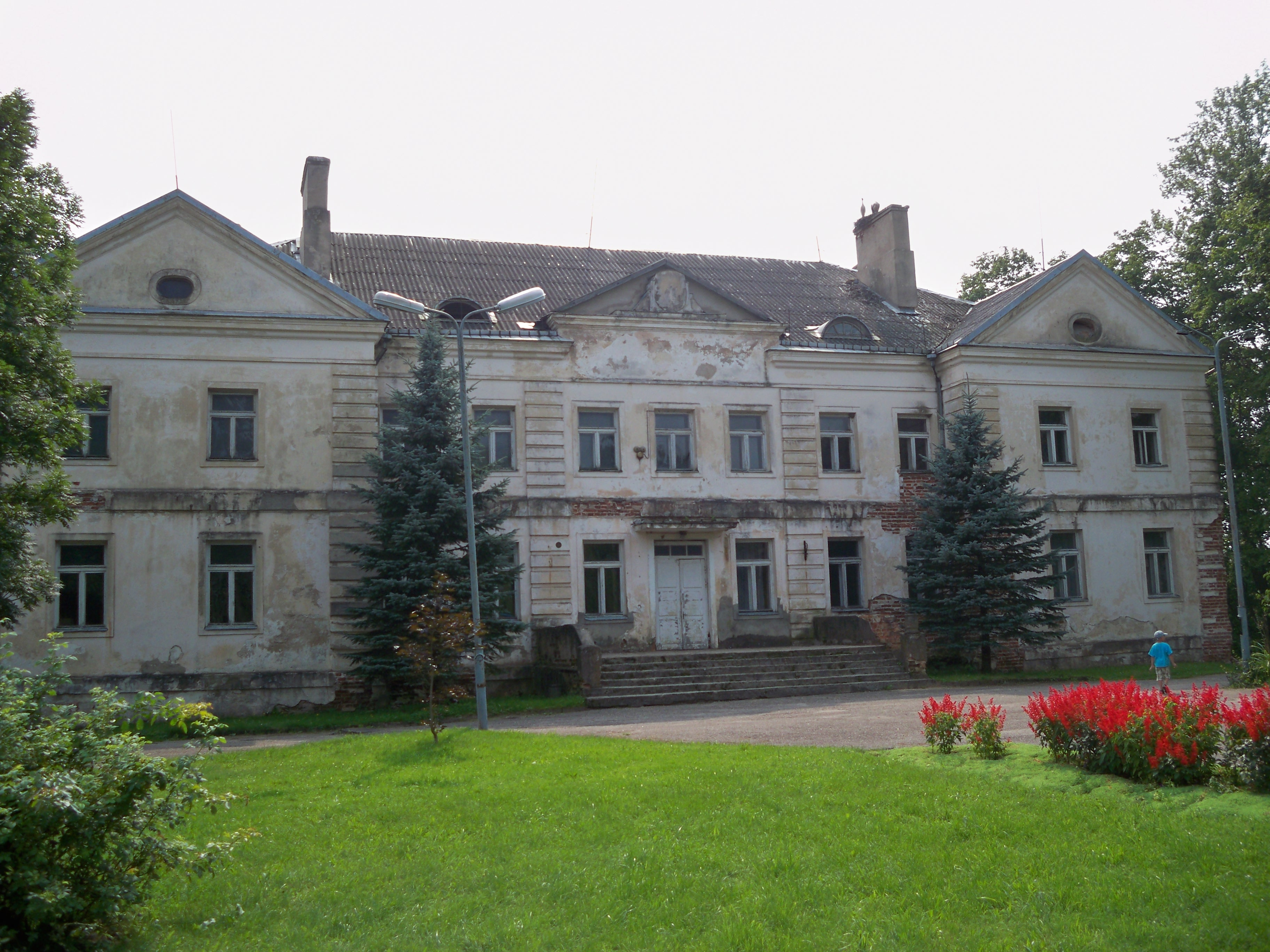
Manor in 2010

A school operated until 1989.

Antazavė Manor is now (2020) a care home.

== Park ==
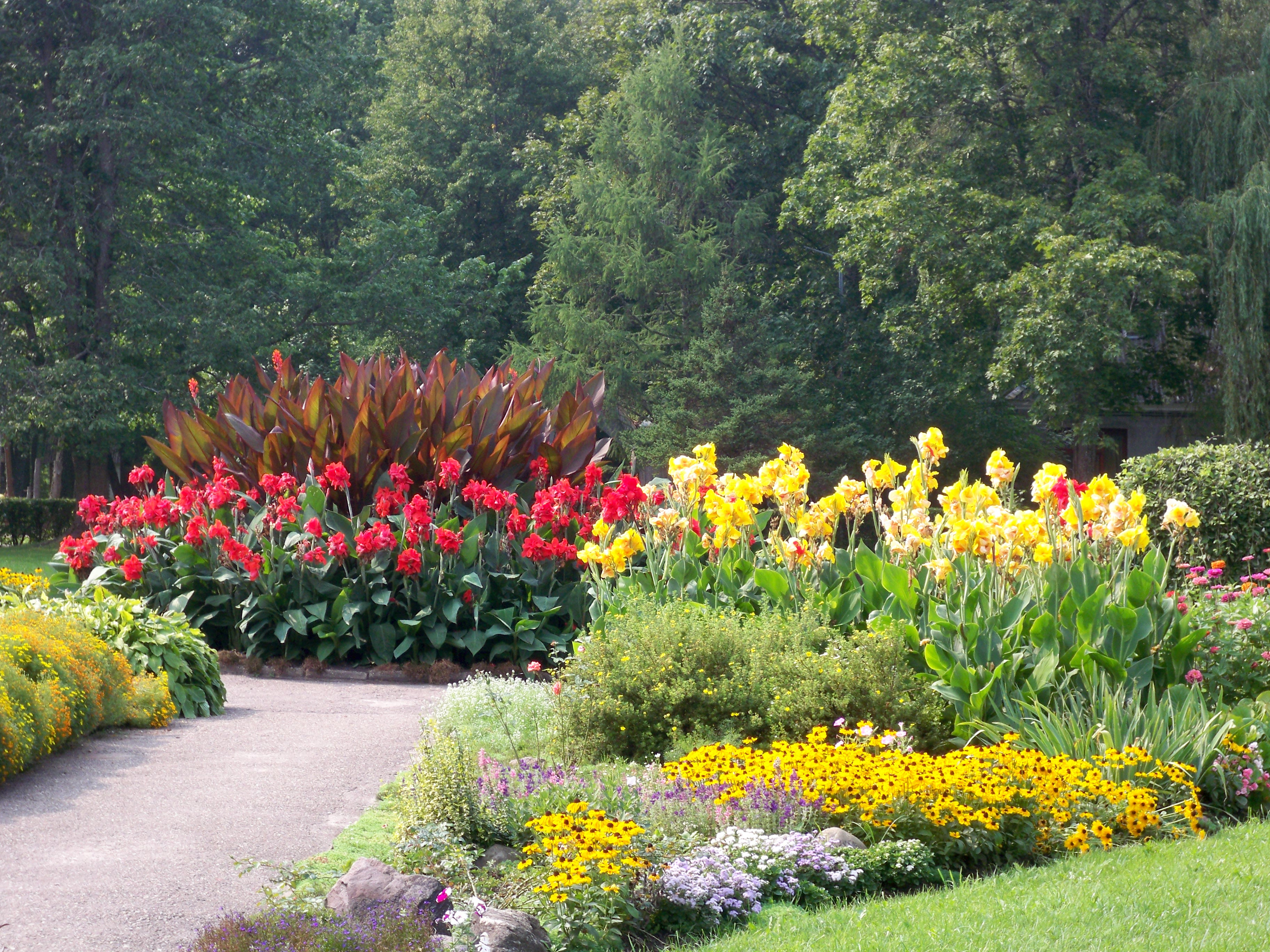

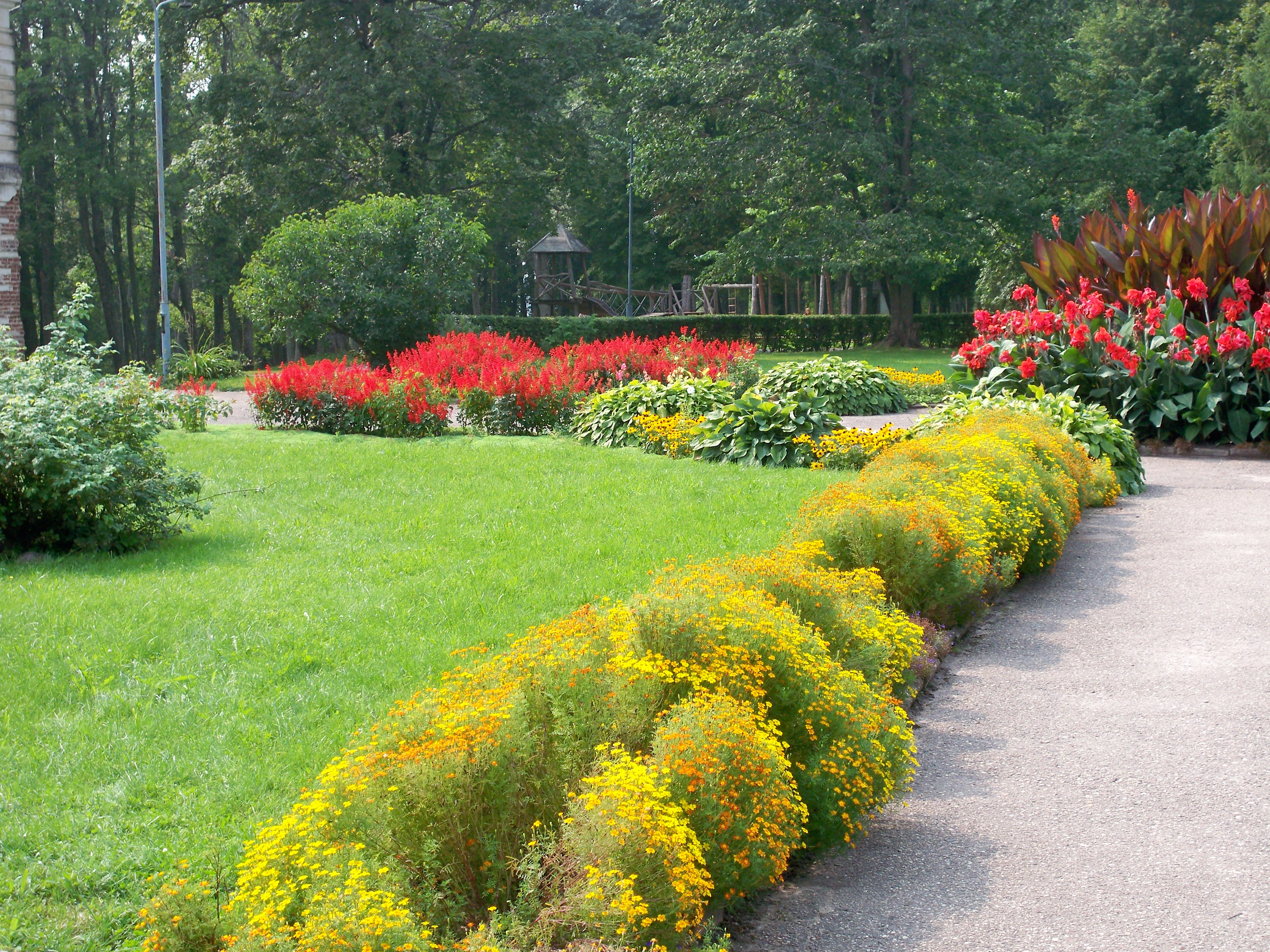

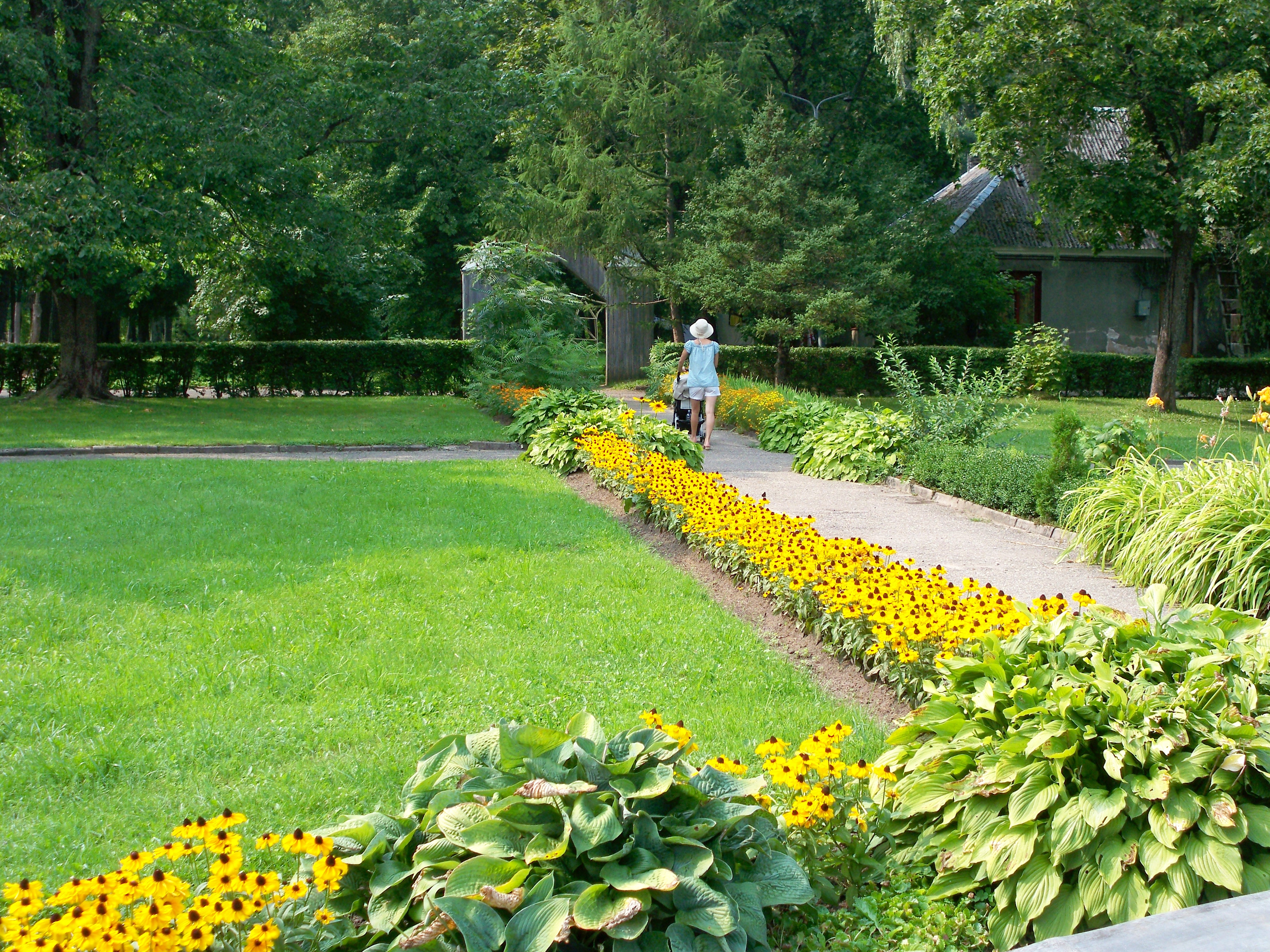

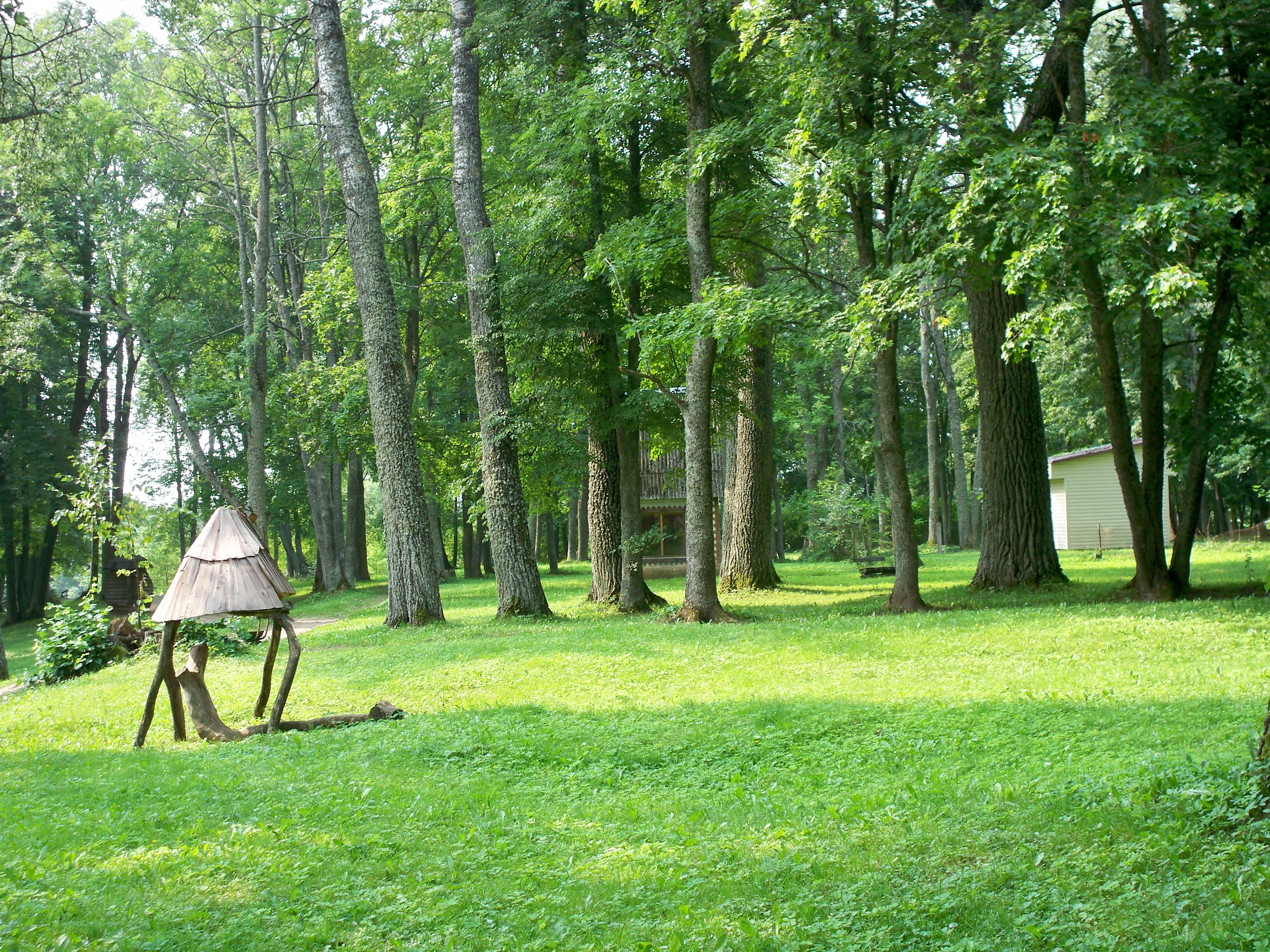
