= Konstanty Ludwik Plater =

Polish-Lithuanian noble

- Starosta of Livonia and Dyneburg
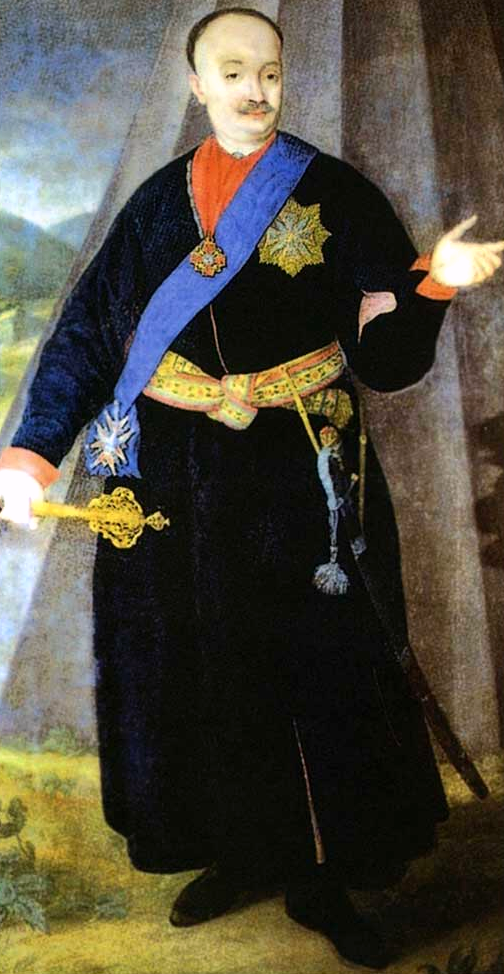
- Konstanty Ludwik Plater, portrait by Italian painter Filippo Castaldi, c. 1760-1762.
- Born: 1722
- Died: 31 March 1778 (aged 55–56); Krāslava, Mogilev Governorate, Russian Empire
- Noble family: Broel-Plater
- Father: Jan Ludwik Plater z Broelu
- Mother: Rozalia Brzostowska z Brzostowa

Konstanty Ludwik Plater (Lithuanian: Konstantinas Liudvikas Pliateris) (1722 – 31 March 1778 in Krāslava), was Castellan of Trakai from 1770, voivode of Mstislavl from 1758 to 1770, Castellan of Polotsk from 1754 to 1758, the Great Scribe of Lithuania from 1746 to 1754, Marshal of the Lithuanian Tribunal in 1754, and Starosta of Livonia and Dyneburg. In 1754, he was awarded with the Order of White Eagle, Knight of the Order of Saint Stanislaus, and the Russian Order of Saint Alexander Nevsky. He married Countess Augustyna Ogińska on 16 August 1744.
