= Federico Caputi =

Italian footballer (1950–2025)

Personal information
- Date of birth: 13 May 1950
- Place of birth: Latina, Italy
- Date of death: 3 August 2025 (aged 75)
- Position: Defender

Youth career
- 1969–1970: Latina

Senior career*
Years	Team	Apps	(Gls)
1970–1971	Latina		
- * Club domestic league appearances and goals

Federico Caputi (13 May 1950 – 3 August 2025) was an Italian football player and manager who played as a defender.

== Background ==
Caputi was born in Latina on 13 May 1950. He died on 3 August 2025, at the age of 75.

== Career ==
After growing up in the ranks of Latina, Caputi made his debut in the first team in Serie C in the 1969–70 season.

He continued his career with Monza, Lucchese, Pescara, Atalanta, and Catania, appearing in Serie C, Serie B and Serie A. For Pescara, he made 95 appearances scoring 7 goals between 1982 and 1985, helping the club promoted to Serie B in the 1982–83 season.
