= María Itatí Castaldi =

Argentine Paralympic basketball player

Personal information
- Nationality: Argentine
- Born: 16 October 1988 (age 37)

Sport
- Country: Argentina
- Sport: Wheelchair basketball
Medal record
Wheelchair basketball
Representing Argentina

María Itatí Castaldi (born 16 October 1966) is an Argentine basketball player, member of the Paralympics team for her country.

== Biography ==
Until 2006, she was a hockey player and a member of the Ferroviarios club. That year, she travelled to Frank, Santa Fe province to play a match, but a car accident caused a spinal injury.

In 2012, she started to play basketball in CILSA, and they called the selection, they are testing female players, and the experience that first was part of her rehabilitation, she took her in several international competitions.
