= Michał Plater-Zyberk =

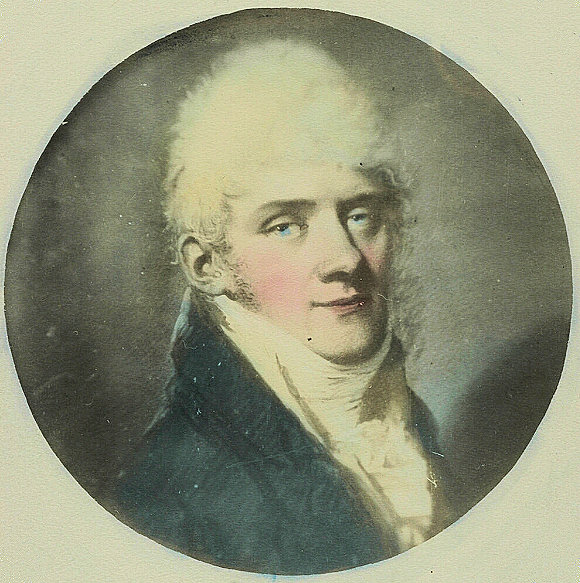
Young Michał Plater-Zyberk

Count Michał Plater-Zyberk (28 December, 1777 – 1862, Schlossberg) – Polish nobleman, naturalist, civilian vice-governor of Vilnius.

== Biography ==
His parents were Kazimierz Konstanty Plater and Izabela Borch, daughter of Jan Andrzej Borch, Great Crown Chancellor. In 1803, he married Izabela Helena Syberg zu Wischling, Zyberk coat of arms, daughter of Jan Tadeusz Syberg zu Wischling, the last male representative of the Syberg family. In order to save his wife's family name, he adopted her surname and coat of arms, for which he received a special consent from Emperor Alexander I. Thus, he started a new line – Plater-Syberg, soon polonized to Plater-Zyberk.

In his youth, he took part in the Kościuszko Uprising (1794) and traveled with his parents. After getting married, he settled in the Schlossberg estate. He was a lover of science. In 1805 he was elected an honorary member of the Imperial University of Vilnius, in January 15, 1806 he was elected as school inspector for the governorates of Vitebsk and Mogilev. He belonged to the Typographic Society in Vilnius and the Courland Society for the Study of Literature and Art, which he co-founded. He was a member of several masonic lodges: Szkoła Sokratesa (lit. 'School of Socrates'), Zum Guten Hirten (lit. 'To the Good Shepherd'), and the Doskonała Jedność (lit. 'Perfect Unity').

In 1816, he took the office of the civilian vice-governor of Vilnius. For the next few years, he actually ran the governorate, while Governor Franciszek Ksawery Drucki-Lubecki stayed in Warsaw most of the time as a member of the commission for settling the financial accounts between Kingdom of Poland and Russian Empire. The idea of abolishing serfdom became popular among the nobility of Vilna Governorate, influenced by the acts abolishing serfdom in Courland and Estonia in 1816 and 1817. The reform became the subject of debate at the governorate assembly in Vilnius on December 30, 1817. Although Plater-Zyberk was in favor of the reform, he ordered the assembly to close its session, and the next day notified the Governor-General Alexander Rimsky-Korsakov of the incidents, and then the Emperor himself, proposing that the reform be taken up by the imperial court. The imperial court rejected the idea of reform and ordered to reprimand Plater-Zyberk and the marshal of the nobility, Teodor Ropp.

== Līksna meteorite ==
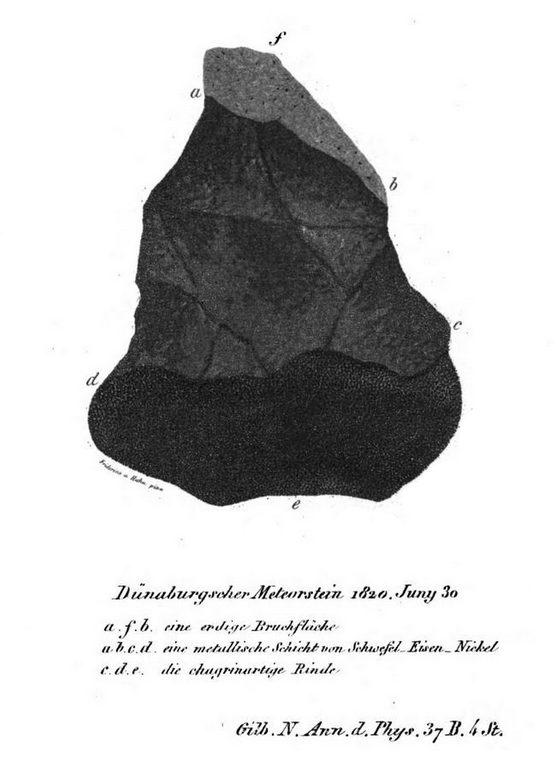
Līksna meteorite. Drawing from the journal "Annalen der Physik", 1821.

He was the first to describe the fall of a meteorite that took place on July 12, 1820 near Līksna (probably in Lazdāni), about 5:30 p.m. He also collected its fragments and prepared a detailed documentation of the event. Information about the find was first published in the Allgemeine Deutsche Zeitung für Russland on July 21, 1820, then reprinted in Polish by the Kuryer Litewski on July 24, and later by the Dziennik Wileński in October. Michał Plater-Zyberk sent several fragments of the meteorite to Theodor Grotthuss, who performed their chemical analysis. He also attached a letter in which he described in detail the circumstances of the meteorite's fall, witness accounts, included a map on which he marked the places where the meteorite fragments fell, and made calculations in an attempt to determine the angle of the meteorite's flight. Based on the information from Plater-Zyberk, he published an article on the meteorite in Annalen der Physik in 1821, and a year later in The Edinburgh Philosophical Journal.

Michał Plater-Zyberk also sent fragments of the meteorite to Ignacy Horodecki, at the University of Vilnius, who in turn passed it on through Alexandre Brongniart, a member of the Academy of Sciences in Paris, to André Laugier, a specialist in meteorites. André Laugier conducted research on the meteorite, which he published in 1823-1824. Some fragments of the meteorite were also donated to Warsaw University in February 1828 by Kazimierz Plater-Zyberk, son of Michał.

Today, the largest fragment (weighing 2,760 kg) is in the collection of the museum of the Ukrainian Academy of Sciences in Kyiv. It probably ended up there after the liquidation of Vilnius University in 1832. Other fragments of the meteorite can be found in Dresden, Vienna, Moscow, Kharkiv, London, Calcutta and Hamburg.

== Estate ==
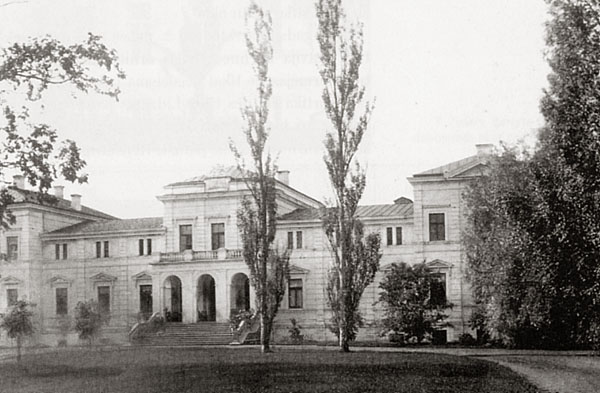
Līksna palace in 1900

The estate of Michał Plater-Zyberk covered an area of about 1,700 square kilometers and 15,000 "souls." Most of the property was the Syberg estate, brought to Michał Plater-Zyberk as a dowry by his wife. The center of the estate inherited from his father was the village of Wielka Indryca (today: Lielindrica). Part of his wife's estate were the palaces in Schlossberg and Līksna.

Michał Plater-Zyberk put up in Uzułmujża, in Rezhitsky Uyezd, St. Peter and Paul's Church in 1820, and St. Michael's Church in Subačius in 1831. Emilia Plater, daughter of Ksawery, the cousin brother of Michał Plater-Zyberk, was raised in the palace in Līksna for some time.

== Family ==
He had twelve children from his marriage to Izabela Syberg:

- Ludwika (1805-1878), married to Karol Jerzy Borch,
- Jan (1807-1809),
- Kazimierz Bartłomiej (1808-1876), married to Ludwika Teodora Borewicz,
- Izabela (1809-1888), married to Julian Emeryk Ropp,
- Józefa (1811-1842), married to Fabian Antoni Broel-Plater,
- Henryk Wacław Ksawery (1811-1903), married to Adelajda Keller,
- Maria (1813-1893), married to Mikołaj Szadurski
- Konstanty (1814-1850), married to Aniela Broel-Plater
- Józef (1818-1839),
- Michał (1819-1823),
- Anna (1821-1904), married to Ludwik Orpiszewski,
- Stanisław Kazimierz (1823-1896), married to Maria Teresa Borch.

== Bibliography ==
- Wereszycka, Helena (1981). "Michał Plater-Zyberk". Polski Słownik Biograficzny (in Polish). Vol. 26. Wrocław. pp. 694–697.
