= David A. Caputo =

David Armand Caputo became the sixth president of Pace University in 2000.

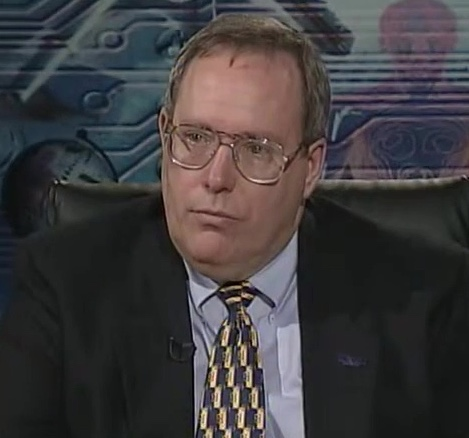
Caputo on CUNY TV's Education Forum, 1999

He serves as co-chair of the New York State Regents' Professional Standards and Practices Board, as a director of the National Association of Independent Colleges and Universities, on the Council of Presidents of the Association of Governing Boards of Universities and Colleges, and as a director of the Lower Manhattan Cultural Council, and the Westchester Arts Council. Caputo also serves on the Council on Foreign Relations.

He received his B.A. in government from Miami University in Oxford, Ohio and his M.A. and Ph.D. in Political Science from Yale University. Prior to his appointment at Pace he served for five years as president of Hunter College, the largest college in the City University of New York system. Before that, he was at Purdue University in West Lafayette, Indiana, for 25 years, last serving as dean of its School of Liberal Arts.

On May 15, 2007, he announced his retirement from the position of President of Pace University, effective June 3.
