= Khaim Eidus =

Soviet Politician

- Born: December 9, 1896; Krāslava
- Died: 2 June 1972 (aged 75); Moscow
- Education: Psychoneurological Institute, Red Army Military Academy
- Scientific career
- Fields: Japanese studies
- Workplaces: Institute of Oriental Studies of the Russian Academy of Sciences

Khaim Tevelevich Eidus (also Eidous, Russian: Хаим Тевелевич Эйдус; December 9, 1896 – January 5, 1972) was a Soviet politician, orientalist, and Japanologist known for many influential publication on the history and economy of Japan.

== Biography ==
Khaim Eidus was born in Krāslava, Vitebsk Governorate, Russia (Now Latvia). He studied at the Psychoneurological Institute in Petrograd. In 1924 he graduated from the Oriental department of the Red Army Military Academy.

In 1917 he conducted political education among Jewish workers in the leather trade union (Vitebsk), worked in the Committee on Prisoners Returning from Germany ("Plenbezh").

In 1925–26, he served as the Consul (representative) of the USSR in Japan (Osaka).

In 1926–31, he served as Deputy Head of the Colonial sector of the Profintern.

In 1931–72 he switched to academic work first at the Institute of World Economy and World Politics (now Institute of World Economy and International Relations), then at the Institute of Economics of the Russian Academy of Sciences and the Institute of Oriental Studies of the Russian Academy of Sciences. He is the author of about 180 scientific works, including 18 monographs. The main directions of scientific research: the concept of the historical process of development of Japan from ancient times to the present day; economic and political problems of the modern and recent history of Japan; state development foreign relations between the USSR and Japan, etc.
