= Joseph Castaldo =

American composer (1927–2000)

Joseph Francis Castaldo (December 22, 1927, Manhattan, New York – January 27, 2000, Philadelphia Pennsylvania) was an American composer of classical music and a teacher of musical composition and music.

Castaldo was an important figure in Philadelphia musical life in the ’60s, ’70s, '80s and '90's, having served as the Head of the Philadelphia Musical Academy and guided that institution’s evolution into what is now the University of the Arts.

== Works ==
=== Orchestral ===
==== Chamber ====
- Theoria for fifteen winds, piano and percussion
- Askesis (Cycles II) for 14 players
- Elegy (on Texts of Rilke) for soprano and small orchestra
- Protogenesis (for Fels Planetarium)

==== Full ====
- Lacrimosa for strings
- Lacrimosa II for strings
- Epigrams for piano and orchestra
- The Eye of God
- Concerto for Cello
- Concerto for viola and orchestra (1988–89)
  1. Lament
  2. Canticle-Celebration
- Soliloquy and Dialogues for clarinet and string orchestra
- Landscapes
  1. Snake River

=== Chamber ===
- Lament for viola and piano
- Lament for violoncello and piano (1988)
- Lament for clarinet and piano
- Dedications for flute and bassoon (1988)
- Sarabande for solo violoncello
- Two Pieces for solo clarinet (1985, revised 1987)
- Where Silence Reigns for violin, violoncello and piano
- Four Songs from Rilke for voice and piano
- Kannon for solo flute (1978)
- Memento Mori for horn, piano and percussion (1991)
- Photographia for baritone voice, piano and percussion (1972)
- Chamber Sonata for violin and viola
- Dichotomy for woodwind quintet
- Contrasts for solo harp (1956)
- String Quartet No. 1 (1954)
- String Quartet No. 2 (1978)
- String Quartet No. 3 (1994)

=== Piano ===
- Toccata
- Sonatina
- Kaleidoscope
- Sonata (1961)
- Moments
- Haiku
- Metaphors

=== Choral ===
- Ancient Liturgy (first performance, 1990)
- Flight, Sacred Cantata for Soprano, Narrator, Mixed Chorus, Symphonic Winds, and Percussion; Text by John Shoemaker; Commissioned by the Temple University Choirs, Robert Page, Director.
