= Krāslava =

Town and capital of Krāslava Municipality, Latvia

- Town
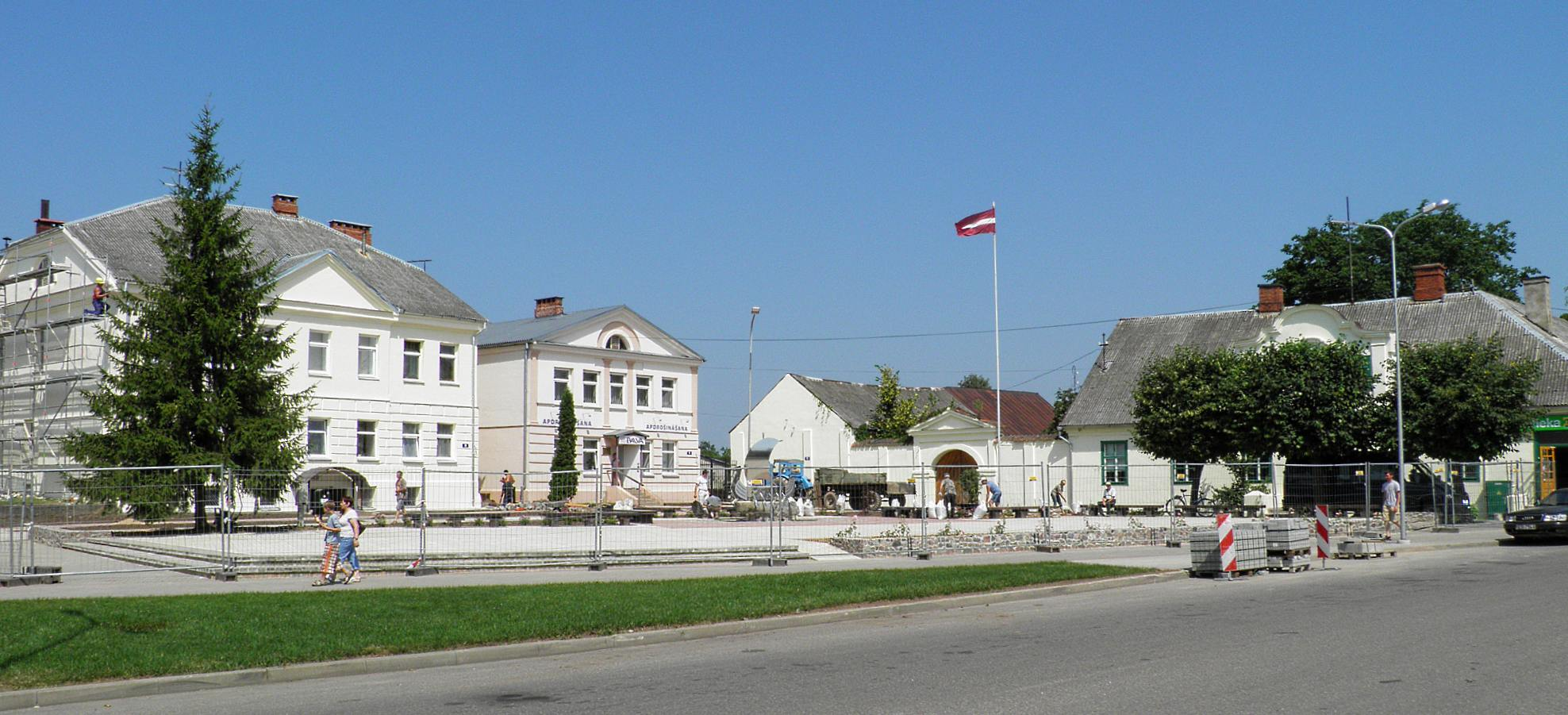
- Krāslava town centre

- Coat of arms

- Location in Latvia
- Coordinates: 55°53′N 27°10′E
- Country: Latvia
- Municipality: Krāslava Municipality
- Town rights: 1923

Area
  - Total: 9.16 km^{2} (3.54 sq mi)
  - Land: 8.50 km^{2} (3.28 sq mi)
  - Water: 0.66 km^{2} (0.25 sq mi)

Population (2026)
  - Total: 6,678
  - Density: 786/km^{2} (2,030/sq mi)
- Time zone: UTC+2 (EET)
  - Summer (DST): UTC+3 (EEST)
- Postal code: LV-560(1–3)
- Calling code: +371 656

Krāslava (Latvian pronunciation; Latgalian: Kruoslova, German: Kreslau, Belarusian: Краслаўка, Polish: Krasław, Russian: Краслава, Креславль) is a town and the administrative centre of Krāslava Municipality. The town lies on the Daugava, upstream and to the east of the city of Daugavpils. Most of the town is situated on the right bank of the Daugava. As defined by Latvian law, Krāslava belongs partially to the Latgale region (on the right side of the Daugava) and partially to the Selonia region (on the left side of the Daugava).

== History ==
- Krāslava was an important hillfort on the waterway from the Varangians to the Byzantine Empire since early Middle Ages, part of the orthodox Principality of Jersika in the 13th century.
- In 1558, it was mentioned for the first time in written sources of Livonian Order as Kreslau (in German).
- In 1676 the church was built by Jesuit Order and Krāslava became the most northern located center of the Jesuit movement on the border with the areas dominated by Protestant and Orthodox churches.
- In 1729 Count Jan Ludwik Plater bought Krāslava. For nearly two centuries the Plater family determined Kraslava economical and cultural life.
- Craftmen from Poland and Germany in co-operation with local people organized the production of carpets, velvet, silk and cotton material, weapons, jewellery and other goods. The goods were in demand at the four Kraslava fairs and also exported to Courland, Poland and Germany.
- Between 1757 and 1842 Krāslava was home for a Roman Catholic seminary, one of the first educational institutions in Latgale region.

== Notable people ==
- Kazimierz Bujnicki (1788-1878), a Polish writer.
- Konstantin Budkevich (1867 in Zubry manor – 1923), a Polish Catholic priest, executed in the Lubyanka Prison on Easter Sunday 1923.
- Nikolai Lossky (1870–1965), a Russian philosopher
- Naoum Aronson (1872–1943), a sculptor who lived most of his life in Paris
- Donatas Malinauskas (1877–1942), a Lithuanian politician and diplomat, signatory of the Act of Independence of Lithuania
- Khaim Eidus (1896–1972), a Soviet politician, orientalist and Japanologist
- Katrina Krumpane (born 1980), a Latvian operatic soprano and vocal educator.

=== Sport ===
- Juris Silovs (1950–2018), 100 metres athlete, team silver and bronze medallist in the 1972 & 1976 Summer Olympics
- Valentīna Gotovska (born 1965) a retired Latvian long jumper.
- Ineta Radēviča (born 1981), long jump and triple jump athlete, competed in the 2012 Summer Olympics
- Ilze Gribule (born 1984), female javelin thrower
- Dmitrijs Silovs (born 1989), a Paralympic athlete who competes in javelin throw and shot put and was a former long jumper
- Sandra Aleksejeva (born 1991), a BMX racer, she competed at the 2012 Summer Olympics
- Jānis Timma (1992–2024), basketball player

== Gallery ==
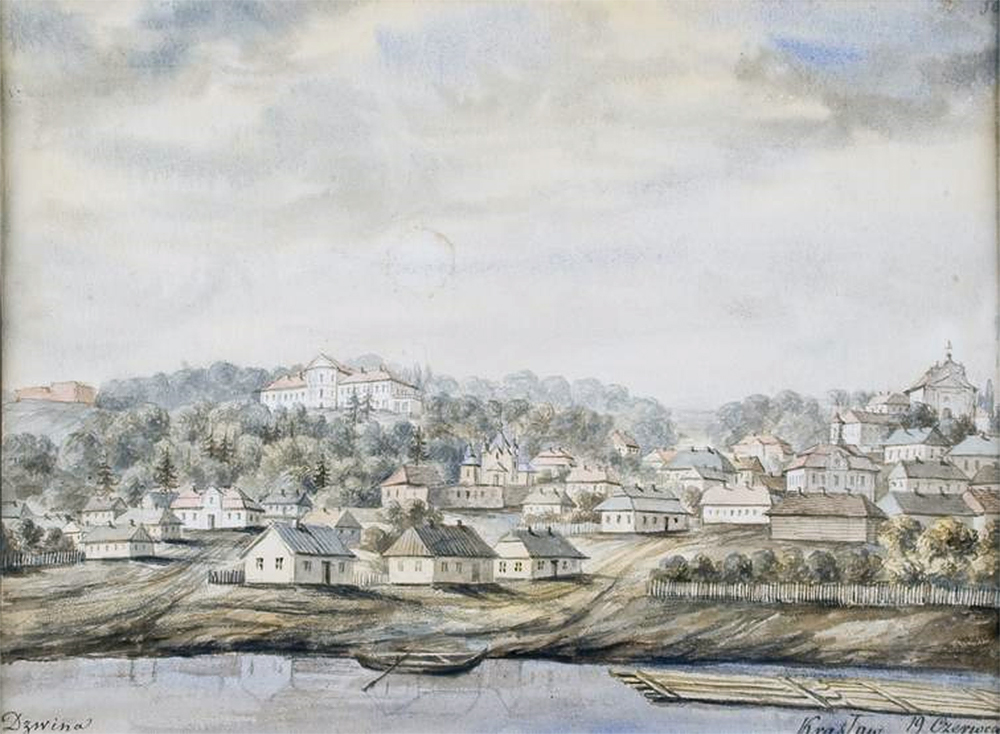
Panorama of Krāslava in 1875–1876

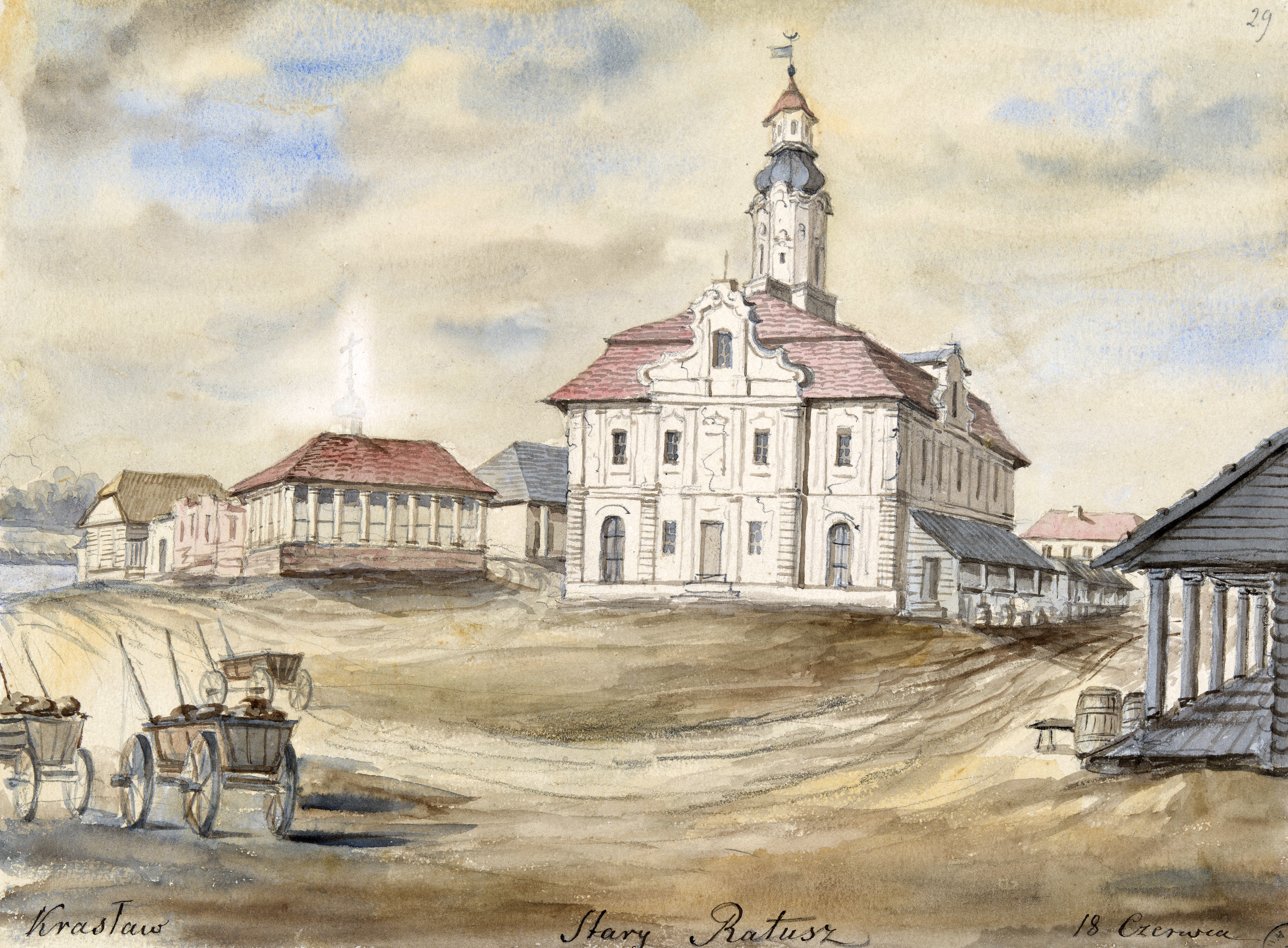
Krāslava Town Hall in 1875–1876

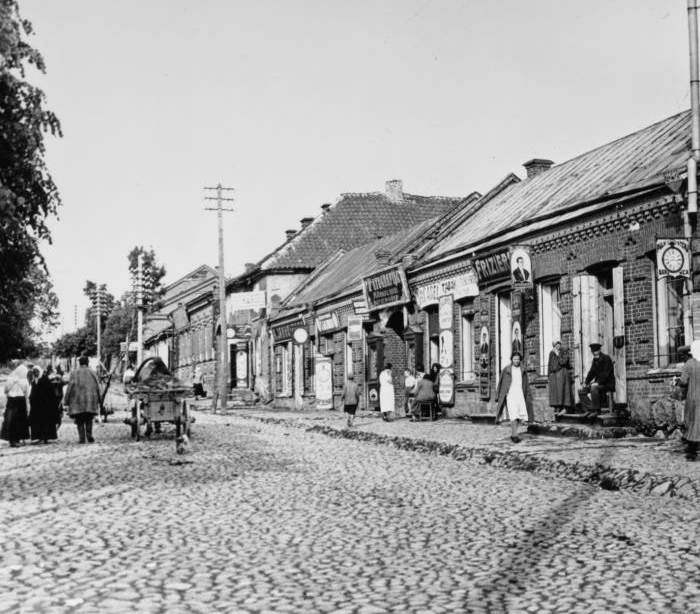
Brivibas Street in Krāslava, 1898

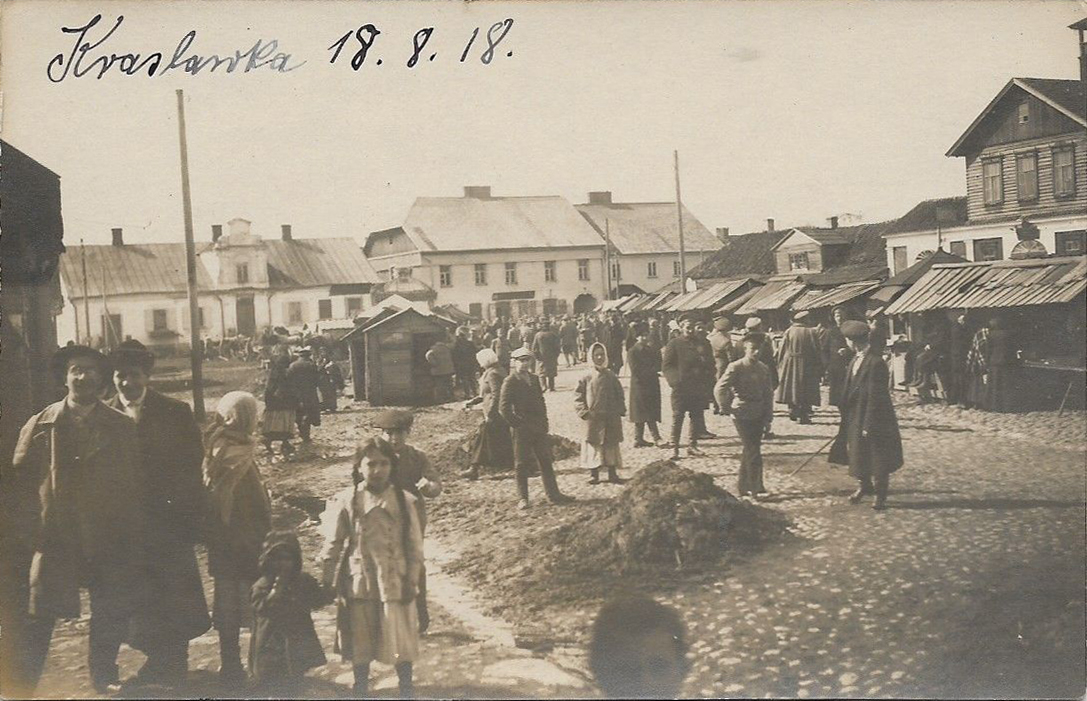
Krāslava Market Square in 1918

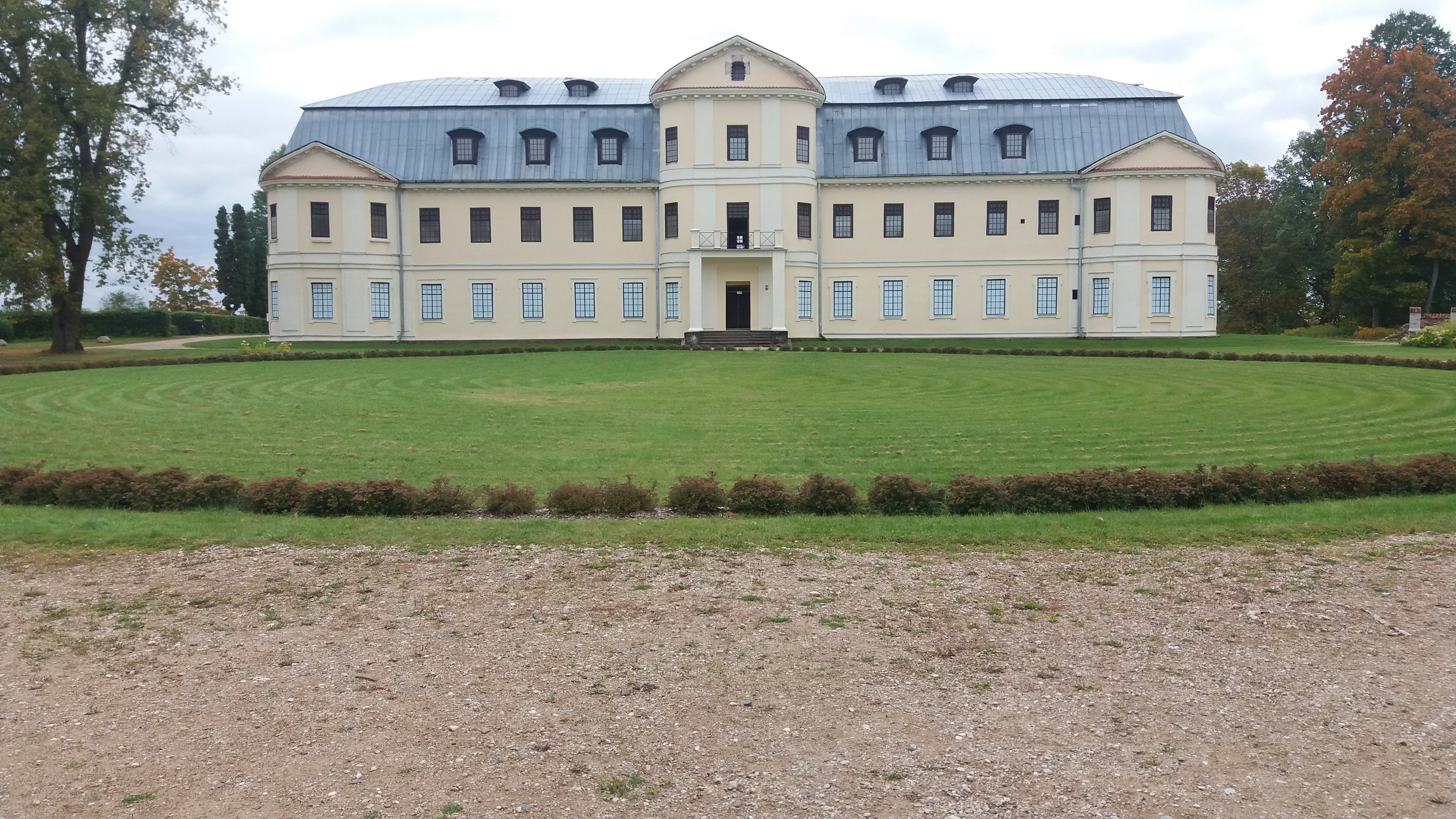
Krāslava Palace

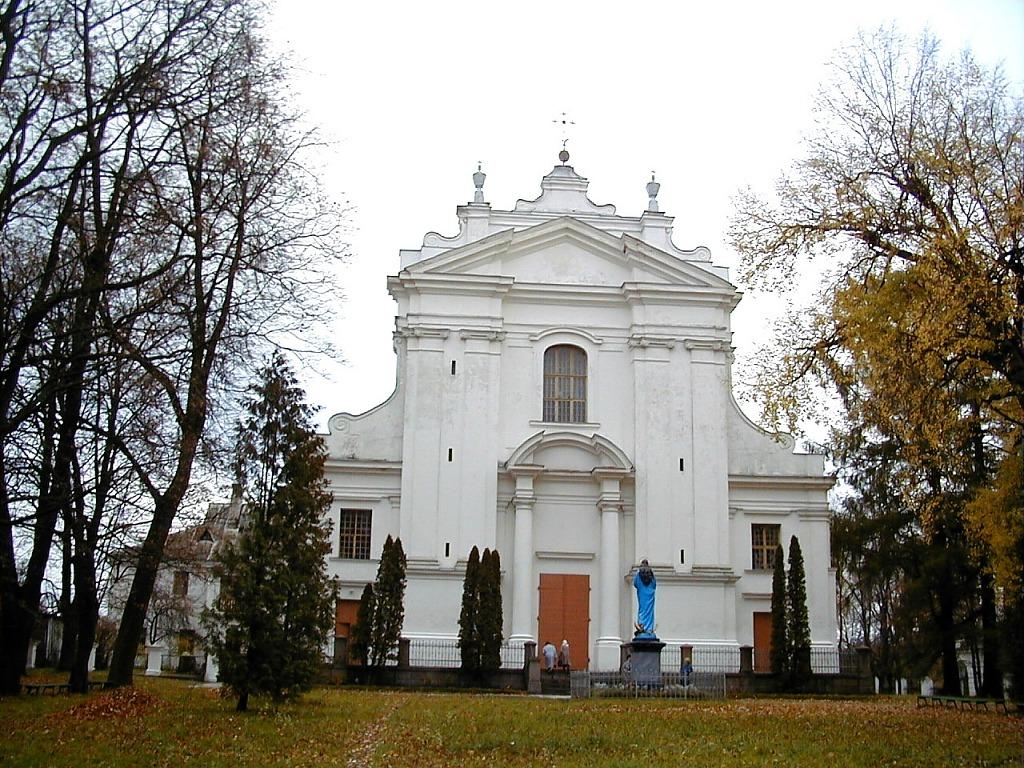
Krāslava Catholic Church

== See also ==
- Krāslava New Palace
- Krāslava Old Palace
- List of cities in Latvia

== Transportation ==
Krāslava is home to a station on the Latvian Railways.

Services at Krāslava Station
- Preceding station	LDz	Following station
  Daugavpils towards Riga	Riga–Daugavpils	Terminus
  Daugavpils Terminus	Daugavpils-Indra	Indra Terminus
