= Denis Caputo =

Argentine footballer

Personal information
- Full name: Denis Federico Caputo Castillo
- Date of birth: September 21, 1989 (age 37)
- Place of birth: Córdoba, Argentina
- Height: 1.68 m (5 ft 6 in)
- Position: Midfielder

Team information
- Current team: Universitario de Sucre
- Number: 9

Youth career
- 2005: Racing de Córdoba

Senior career*
Years	Team	Apps	(Gls)
2006–2008	Racing de Córdoba		
2009	General Paz Juniors		
2009–2010	Talleres		
2010	Cobresal	9	(1)
2011–2012	Central Norte		
2012	Banfield		
2012	San Martín de Mendoza		
2013	Universitario de Sucre	4	(0)
- * Club domestic league appearances and goals

Denis Caputo (born September 21, 1989, in Córdoba, Argentina) is an Argentine footballer currently playing for Universitario de Sucre in the Liga de Futbol Profesional Boliviano.
