= Francesco Caputo (painter) =

Italian painter

Francesco Caputo was an Italian illuminator and miniaturist painter active c. 1600 in Naples.

While studying, he showed an inclination to drawing and became a pupil of the miniaturist Giovanni Battista Rossi. He ended up marrying his daughter. He also illuminated choral manuscripts and Bibles for private commissions.

== Sources ==
- Boni, Filippo de' (1852). Biografia degli artisti ovvero dizionario della vita e delle opere dei pittori, degli scultori, degli intagliatori, dei tipografi e dei musici di ogni nazione che fiorirono da'tempi più remoti sino á nostri giorni. Seconda Edizione.. Venice; Googlebooks: Presso Andrea Santini e Figlio. p. 185.
