= Ettore Castaldi =

Italian painter (1877–1956)

Ettore Castaldi (16 December 1877 – 16 August 1956) was an Italian painter, painting mainly outdoor landscapes.

== Biography ==
He was born in Livorno; orphaned at a young age, he was raised by his uncle and put to manual work in the port. This rough environment failed to lessen his vocation for art, encouraged by his encounters with the Labronico painters, including Corrado Michelozzi and Adriano Baracchini Caputi, at the Caffè Bardi.

He made many frescoes in the churches of the Garfagnana. In 1920 signed the Declaration of Tribute to Puccini, published by the Artistic Livorno after the split which gave rise to the establishment of Gruppo Labronico.

As an anarchist sympathiser, in 1924, he went into exile in Santos, Brazil. He remained in touch with family, friends, and painters of Livorno, but spent the war in Brazil, and chose not to return to Italy. He died in Santos, Brazil, on 16 August 1956.

In 2013, a portrait of Castaldi painted by Corrado Michelozzi was donated to the Pinacoteca Carlo Servolini.
