= Filippo Castaldi =

Italian portrait painter

Filippo Castaldi (circa 1710 – 1785) was an Italian portrait painter of the late-Baroque period, active mainly in Southern Italy and Poland.

== Life ==
He was born in Arpino, trained in Rome, but became a painter to the Royal court of Poland.
