= Adriano Baracchini Caputi =

Italian painter (1883–1968)

Adriano Baracchini Caputi (1883–1968) was an Italian painter, active in Livorno in a Divisionist style.

He was born in Florence, and moved at the age of 16 years to Livorno. He was influenced by the Vittore Grubicy, and practiced divisionist style along with Benvenuto Benvenuti. Baracchini Caputi was invited to submit to a Salon of Italian Divisionists in 1907. He also exhibited in 1912 and 1914 to the Venice Biennale. He frequented the Caffè Bardi and in 1920 became one of the founders of the Gruppo Labronico, of which he became secretary and treasurer. He exhibited at the 1921 Biennale of Rome, along with a retrospective of Grubicy. By the 1930s he retired to farming. He died in Livorno.

One of his earlier colleagues in Livorno was Ettore Castaldi.
