= Jan Ludwik Plater =

Voivode of Inflanty

Jan Ludwik Plater (died 1736) was a voivode of Inflanty and a Polish writer.

He was born c. 1690 as a son of voivode of Inflany Jan Andrzej Plater and Ludwika Maria née Grothus. In 1698 he was named cupbearer of Livonia, then on May 15, 1708, starosta of Dyneburg. In 1710 Plater took part in General Council of Warsaw and supported Sandomierz Confederation, listing himself as a Augustus II the Strong supporter. He was deputy for 1718 Sejm. On September 17, 1735, received the seat of voivode of Inflanty, after late Antoni Morsztyn. Shortly after died in November 1736 and his funeral was at the monastery of the Congregation of the Mission in Vilnius.

Jan Ludwik Plater enjoyed authority among the Livonian nobility. He was also considered a talented writer, although of his supposedly enormous output only "Prayers to the Holy Trinity" have survived. Jan Ludwik Plater accumulated considerable wealth. In 1698, he founded a wooden church in the inherited Wielka Indryca (now Lielindrica). He acquired or was bestowed with many estates, including Frejtagshof (Kombulmujża, now Kombuļi), and Krāslava together with the town. The latter became the main seat of the family for the next two centuries.

Around 1720 he married Rozalia Brzostowska. They had a number of children: Józefa, Konstancja, Ferdynand, Kazimierz, Ignacy, Joanna Magdalena, Maria Alojza, Magdalena, and Konstanty Ludwik, voivode of Mstislaw nad Marshal of the Lithuanian Tribunal.
