= Bolesławiec =

- Bolesławiec Śląski
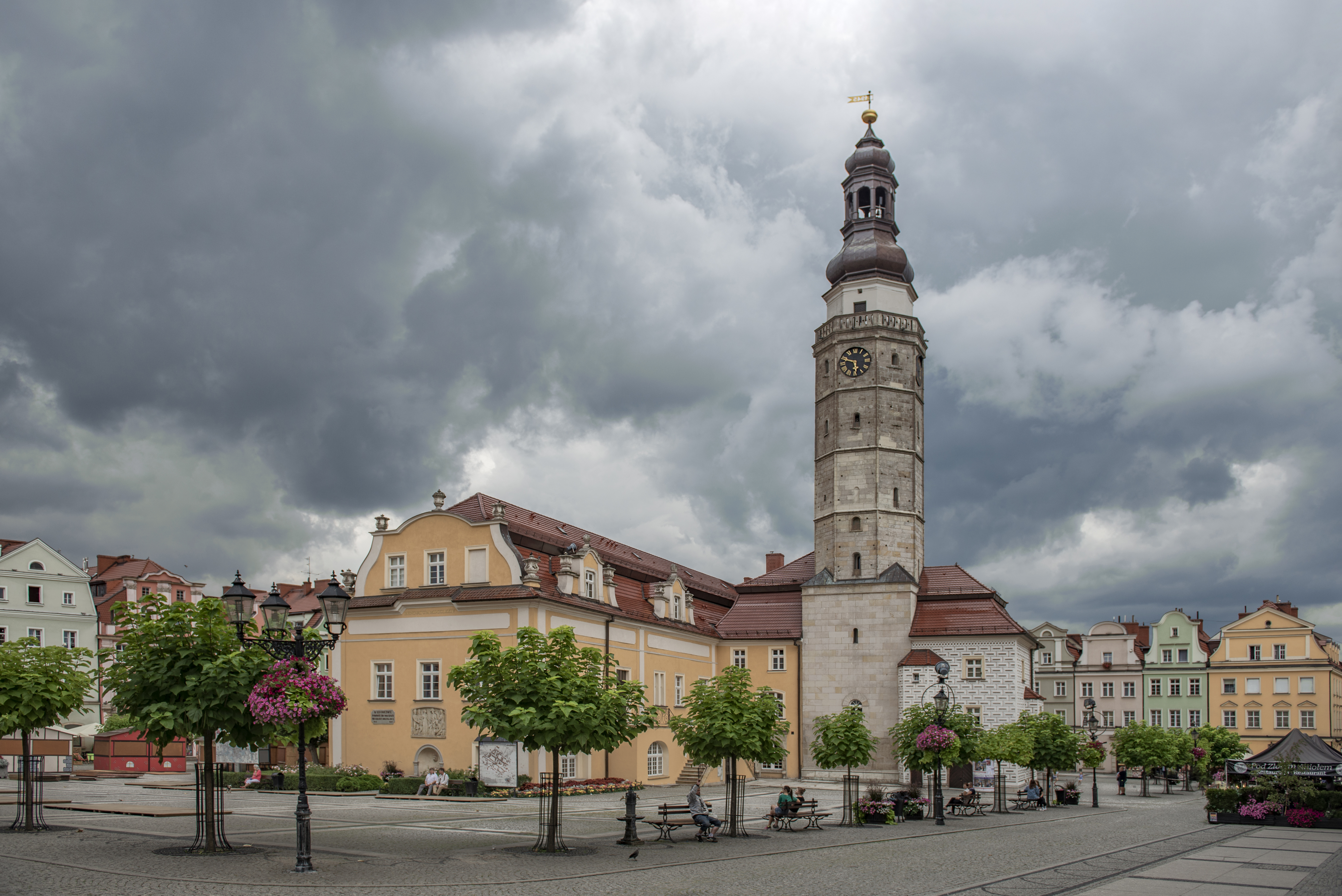
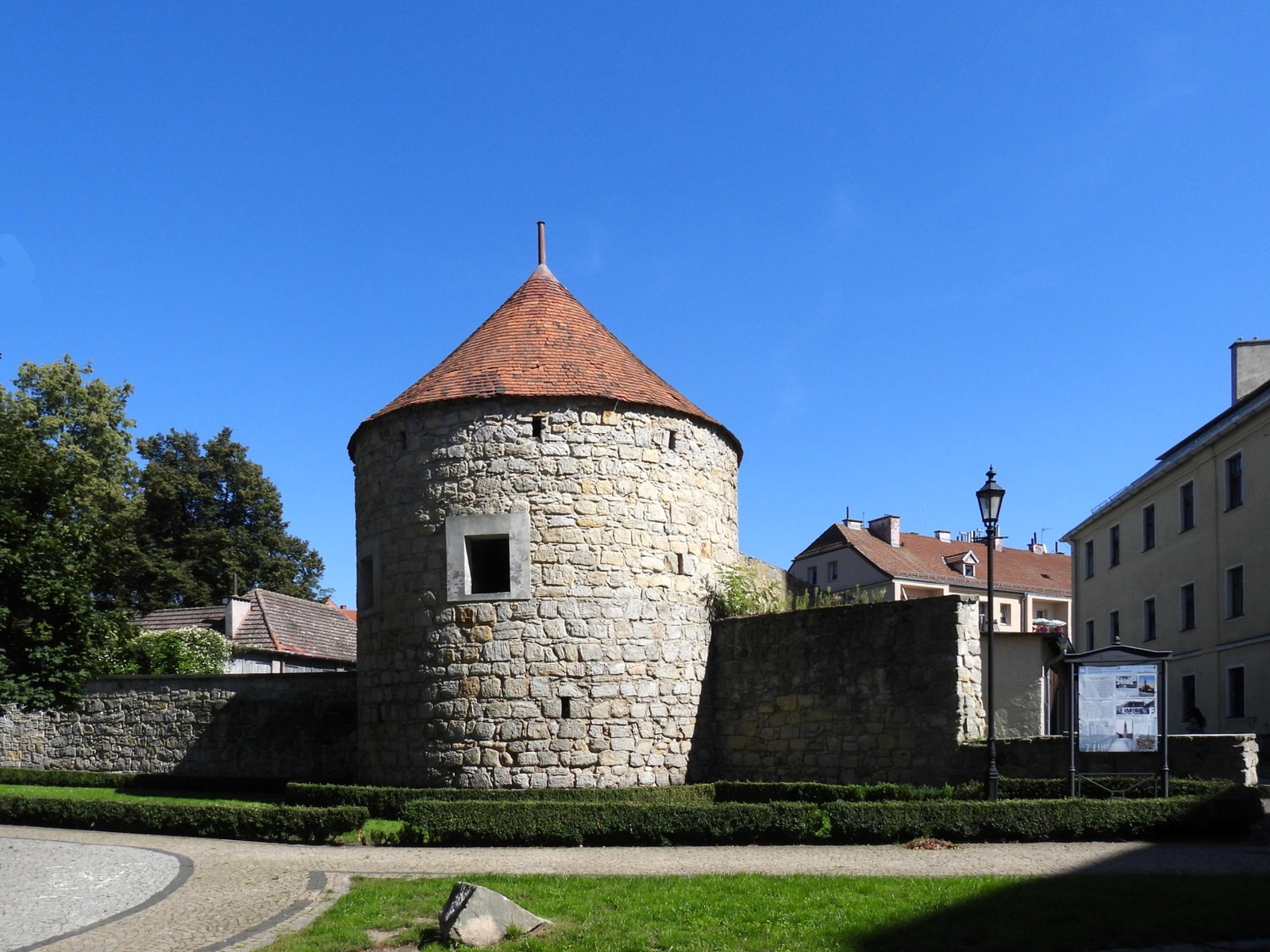
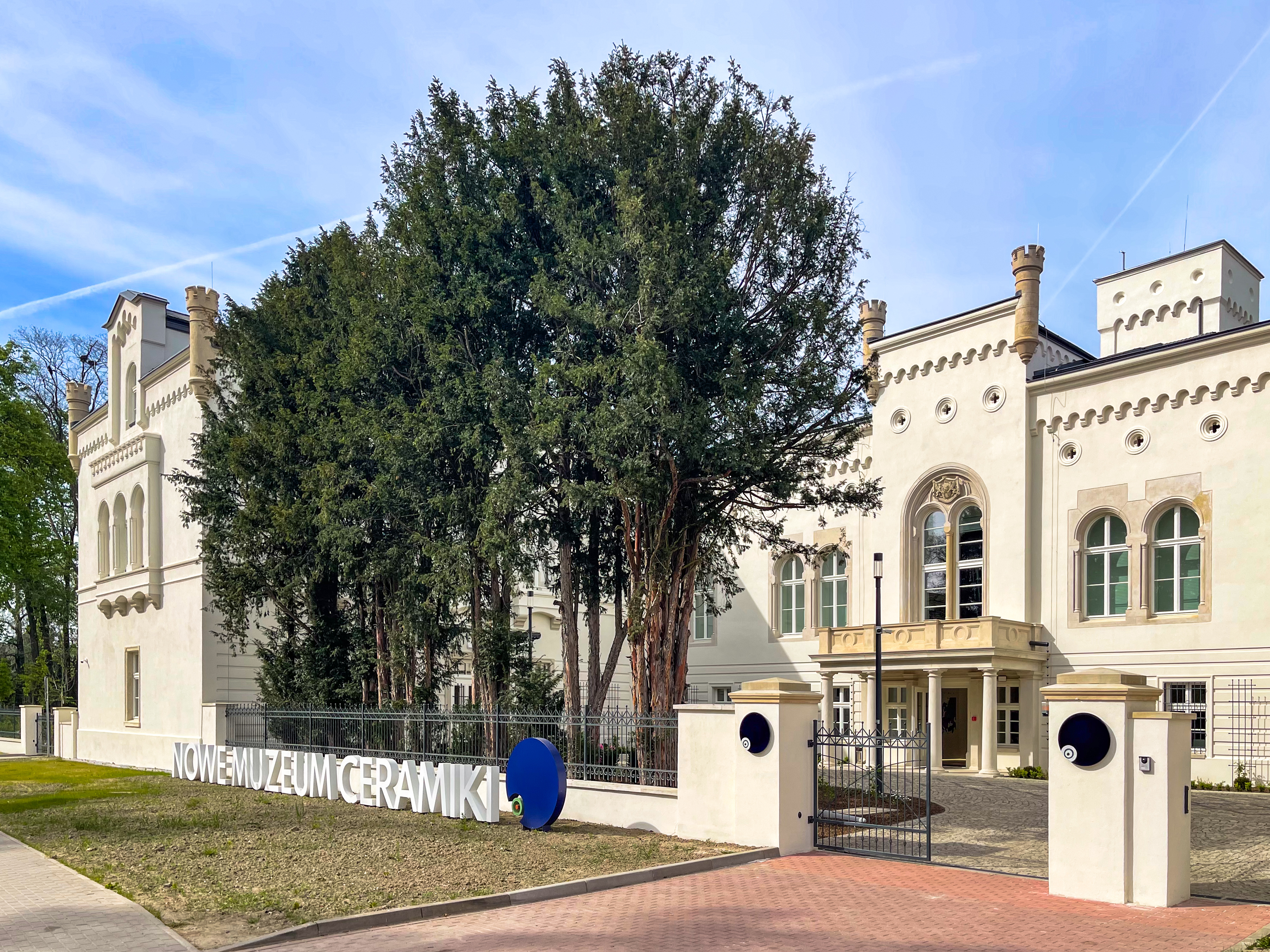
- From top, left to right: Market Square and City Hall; Medieval town walls; Museum of Ceramics

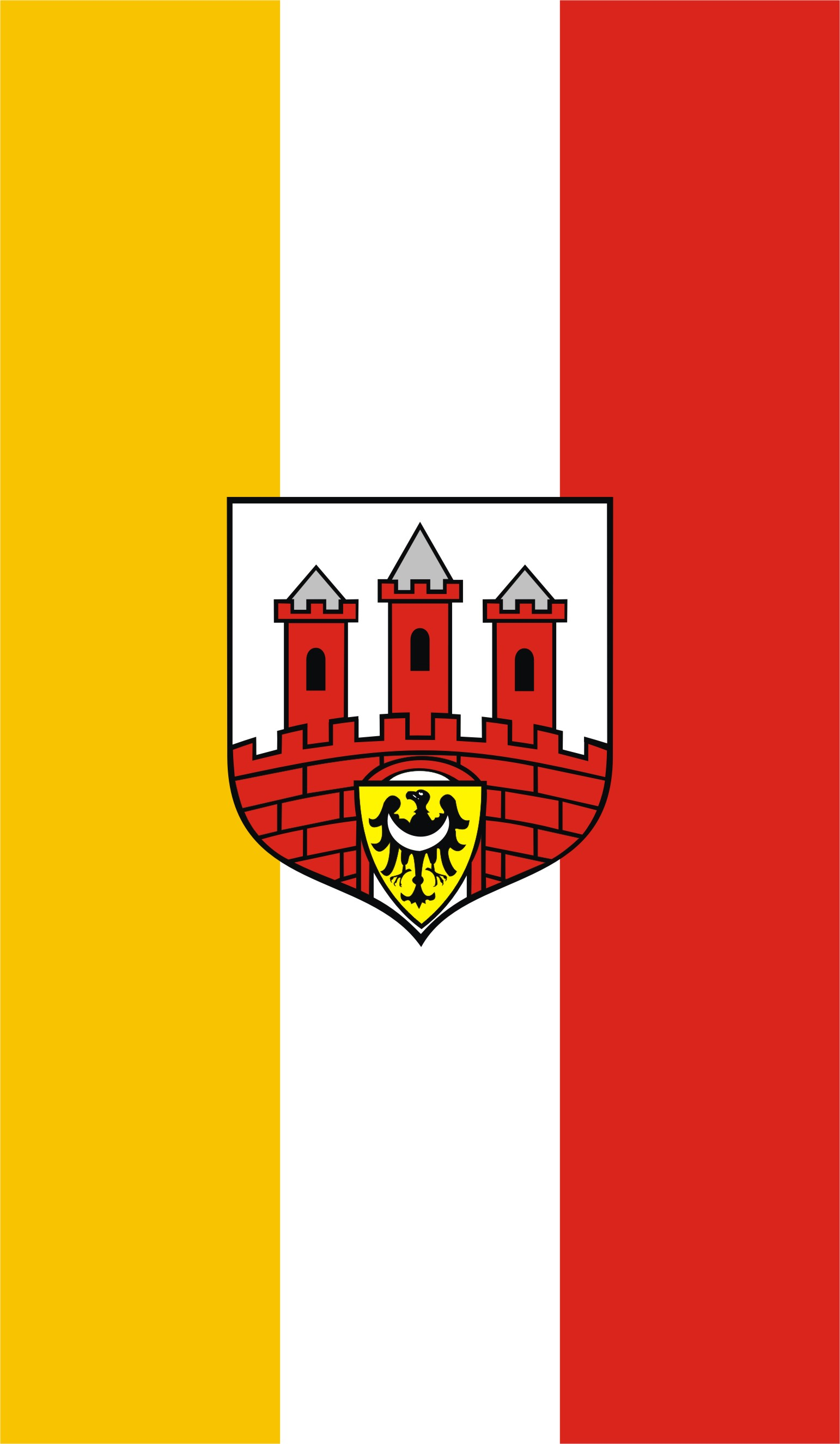
- Flag Coat of arms
- Nickname: Miasto Ceramiki; Town of Ceramics
- Location within Poland
- Coordinates: 51°16′N 15°34′E
- Country: Poland
- Voivodeship: Lower Silesian
- County: Bolesławiec
- Gmina: Bolesławiec (urban gmina)
- Established: 13th century
- City rights: 1251

Government
  - City mayor: Piotr Roman (BS)

Area
  - Total: 22.81 km^{2} (8.81 sq mi)

Population (30 June 2021)
  - Total: 38,280
  - Density: 1,678/km^{2} (4,347/sq mi)
- Time zone: UTC+1 (CET)
  - Summer (DST): UTC+2 (CEST)
- Postal code: 59–700
- Area code: +48 75
- Car plates: DBL
- Climate: Dfb
- Website: Bolesławiec.pl

Bolesławiec (pronounced [bɔlɛˈswavʲɛt͡s]; German: Bunzlau) is a historic city situated on the Bóbr River in the Lower Silesian Voivodeship, in south-western Poland. It is the administrative seat of Bolesławiec County, and of Gmina Bolesławiec (being an urban gmina in its own right). As of June 2021, it has a population of 38,280. Founded in the 13th century, the city is known for its long-standing pottery-making tradition and heritage Old Town.

== Etymology ==
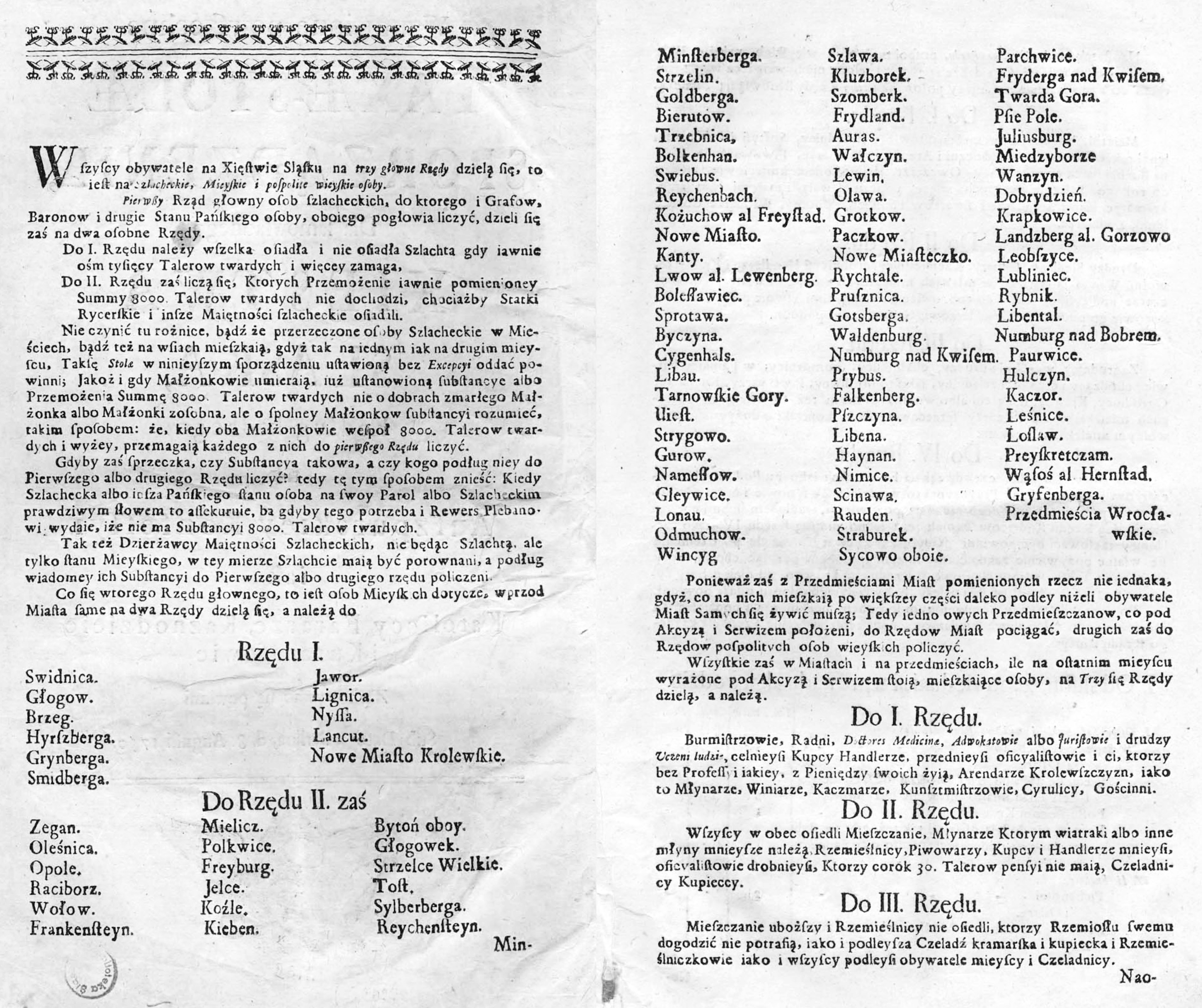
The name Bolesławiec among other names of Silesian towns in an official Prussian document from 1750 issued in Polish in Berlin

The name Bolesławiec is a patronymic name derived from the Slavic name Bolesław, composed of two elements of the old Polish, currently unused term bole(j) meaning very and sław meaning fame. This name literally means "very famous" and was given to the city in honor of the founder Bolesław I the Tall, who founded the city around 1190, granting it numerous privileges. In his list of place names in Silesia, published in Wrocław in 1888, Heinrich Adamy mentions the name of the city recorded in a document from 1196 - Boleslawez, giving its meaning Stadt des Boleslaw I (Polish: City of Bolesław I).

The town, under the Latinized name castrum Boleslavec, is mentioned in a Latin document from 1277 signed by the Polish prince Bolesław (Latin: Boleslaus dux Polonie). In 1295, in the Latin chronicle Liber fundationis episcopatus Vratislaviensis, the town was mentioned under the Latinized name Boleslavia and Boleslawetz, Bolezlavitz.

The name of the town in the Latinized form Boleslavicz is mentioned in a Latin document from 1312 issued in Głogów. In a medieval document written in Latin from October 31, 1310, the city is mentioned under the Latinized name Boleslauia. In 1475, in the Latin statutes Statuta Synodalia Episcoporum Wratislaviensium, the town was mentioned under the Latinized name Boleslauia. In 1613, the Silesian regionalist and historian Mikołaj Henel from Prudnik mentioned the town in his work on the geography of Silesia entitled Silesiographia giving its Latin name: Boleslavia.

The German name Bunzlau, which has been present since the 13th century, is a Germanized form derived from the Polish name. In the work of the Swiss geographer Matthäus Merian entitled "Topographia Bohemiae, Moraviae et Silesiae" from 1650 mentions the city under the name Boleslau.

In 1750, the Polish name Bolesławiec was mentioned in Polish by Frederick II among other Silesian cities in an official ordinance issued for the inhabitants of Silesia. The name of the city as Bolesław was mentioned by the Silesian writer Józef Lompa in the book "A short sketch of the jeography of Silesia for initial science" published in Głogówek in 1847. The Polish name Bolesławiec and the German name Bunzlau were mentioned in 1896 by the Silesian writer Konstanty Damrot in a book on local names in Silesia. In his book, Damrot also mentions older names from Latin documents: 1377 - Boleslawcze, 1417 - Boleslawicz, 1446 - Boleslavice.

The Geographical Dictionary of the Kingdom of Poland gives two names of the town: the Polish name Bolesławiec and the German Bunzlau.

The current name was officially approved in 1946.

== History ==
Historical affiliations

Duchy of Poland c. 990–1025
Kingdom of Poland 1025–1320
Duchy of Jawor 1320–1392
Lands of the Bohemian Crown 1392–1526
Habsburg monarchy 1526–1742
Kingdom of Prussia 1742–1871
German Empire 1871–1918
Weimar Republic 1919-1933
Nazi Germany 1939–1945
Poland 1945 – present

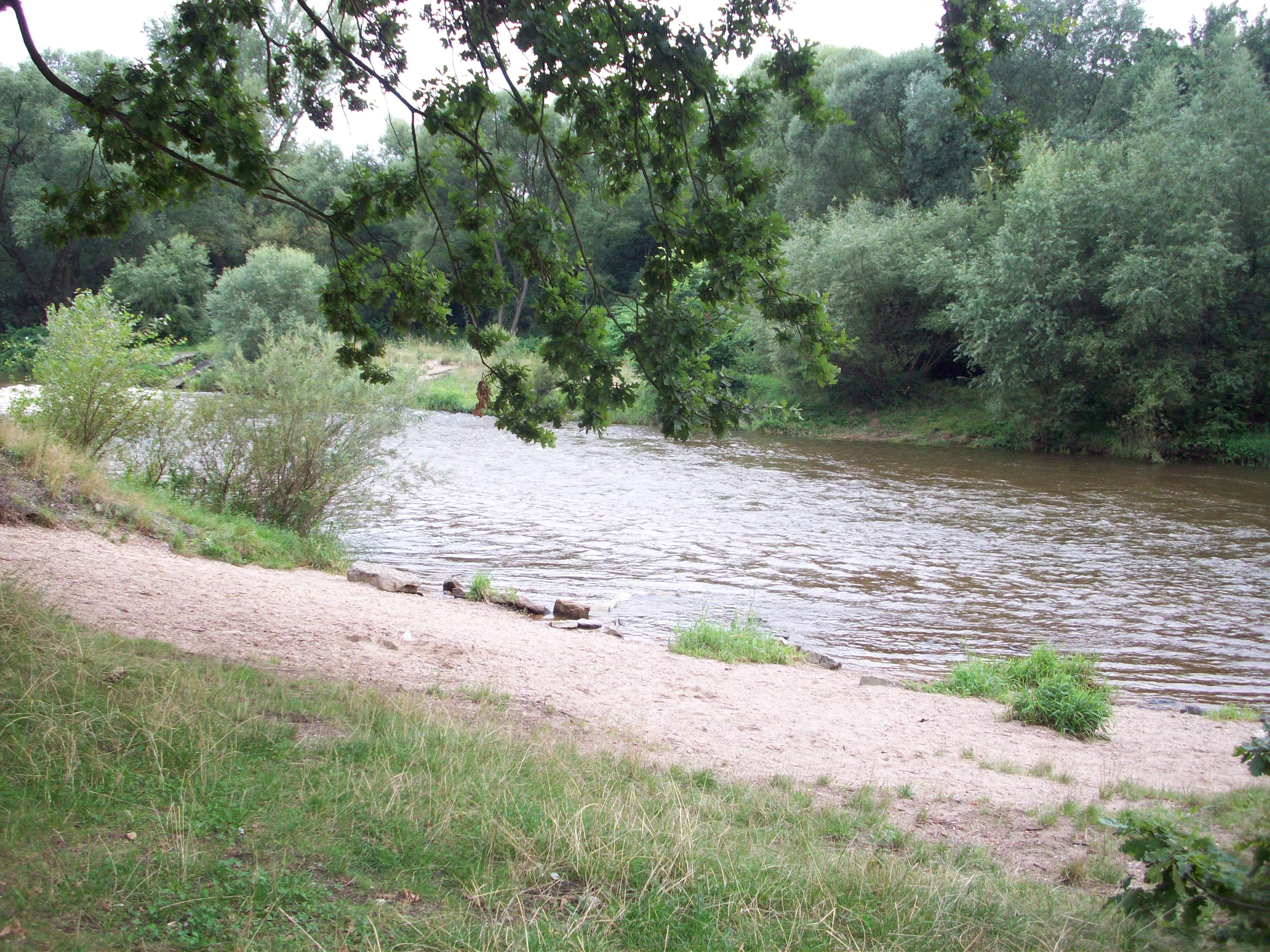
River Bóbr in Bolesławiec

=== Palaeolithic era (c. 10,000 – c. 8300 BC) ===
The oldest traces of human habitation in the Bolesławiec area date from the younger phase of the Late Palaeolithic, i.e. around 10 000 BC. In 1974, on the high terrace of the Bóbr River in Bobrowice near Szprotawa, flint tools from this period were found (a Lyngby type leaf with two fragments of splinters). At the same time, in Golnice near Bolesławiec, also on the terrace of a tributary of the Bóbr River, similar wares were discovered (an asymmetrical thylakus with a retouched base and two large scale fragments of splinters). The location of the finds is closely related to the mountainous character of the Bóbr. The valley of this river, 500 to 3,500 m wide, was under water in the spring and during continuous rainfall. The groundwater level meant that it drained slowly. As a result, the valley was difficult to access for a long time. For their own safety, late Palaeolithic man therefore stayed in the area in areas that protected him from the water element.

=== Mesolithic era (c. 8300 – c. 4500 BC) ===
In the Beaver basin, 45 sites dating to the Mesolithic era have been discovered, from Bolesławiec to Krosno Odrzańskie. All of them, as in the Palaeolithic, are situated at the edges of valleys, on higher terraces or dunes, mainly on the southern or south-western side. The finds discovered are encampments ranging in size from 2–3 acres to 1 ha (in this case it would have been several small functional sites at the time), where few flint wares were found. The people living in the Beaver basin at that time arrived here at the end of the Palaeolithic from the so-called Federmesser and Ahrensburg cultures. After the climate warmed up, the remaining population here participated in the emergence of a Mesolithic community, referred to as the Protocomornic group. After further warming, however, they left the Bober region and a post-Maglemian population, probably from the Chojnice-Pienkowskie culture, arrived in the area at the end of the Boreal period. They were mainly involved in the exploitation of the forest and water environment (hunting, fishing). The end of Mesolithic settlement occurred at the end of the 2nd Neolithic period.

=== Neolithic Age (c. 4500 – 1800 BC) ===
The Bolesławiec area was also penetrated in the Neolithic Age, especially by tribes of the corded ware culture. This is confirmed by a site of this culture discovered in Bolesławice (stone axe). The largest concentrations of settlements occurred in the Głogowska-Barycka Proglacial Valley, the Silesian Lowlands and the Raciborsk Basin, in places with the most fertile soils and somewhat depleted forests. Due to the considerable mobility of the tribes of this culture, it is thought that their farming methods were dominated by herding and some forms of pastoralism. Over time, the people of this culture were assimilated by an incoming community using better bronze products.

=== Bronze Age (1800 – 700 BC) ===
The most important archaeological culture of the Bronze Age was the Lusatian culture, preceded by the Pre-Lusatian culture, which, without losing its grave character, produced a whole range of local features. It was located between the Kaczawa River and the upper Beaver and Szprotawa Rivers. The settlement stabilisation of the people of this culture in Silesia, Saxony, Lusatia and Greater Poland probably took place at this time. An ear pin with a decorated head was found from this period of the so-called Classic Phase of the Prolongation Culture in Bobrowice near Szprotawa. In turn, a bronze hatchet with a rim was found in Osiecznica, not far from Bolesławiec. Although traces of Lusatian people have been found on the banks of almost the entire course of the Bóbr River, the area is not one of the large settlement areas (except in the vicinity of Żagań and Nowogród Bobrzański). A dozen or so sites discovered in the vicinity of Bolesławiec indicate, however, a rather intensive penetration of this part of the lands on the Bóbr River by communities of the Lusatian culture. These sites (cemeteries) are located, among others, in Bolesławiec, Bolesławice, Buczek Mały, Kruszyna-Godnów, Rakowice-Otok.

=== Iron Age (Late Roman period 400–500 AD) ===
The short Halstadt period (700–400 BC), in which the Lusatian culture collapsed, was followed by the Lateen Age (in the vicinity of Wrocław dated to between the 4th century BC and the end of the 2nd century AD). The Bolesławiec area was outside the influence of the 'Celtic' cultural groups. Despite this, a bronze clasp with a free heel and shield was found in Bolesławiec. It represents a rare specimen of a Munssingen clasp with a chord wrapped around the bail. The second of the fibulae, an iron one with a free heel and a small decorated ball, belongs to the late version of the Duchcow clasp (named after a treasure in Duchcow). Both are early Late Late forms. It is presumed that these finds indicate the existence of an additional route of contact between the Celts and the North. In the area of Szprotawa and Stara Kopernia near Żagań, iron covalvic clasps have been discovered in graves of the Pomeranian culture. At the end of the 2nd century A.D., the place of the Celts was taken by the people of the Luboszycki culture (mid 2nd century – 4th–5th century A.D.). Research into settlement in this area in the pre-Roman period and the Roman influence, with the exception of loose finds and pottery proving the existence of a settlement, has so far not confirmed the existence of a settlement here. This is because it was located on the borderline between the Luboszycka culture and the Legnic region of the Przeworsk culture. The aforementioned finds from the period of Roman influence (1st century BC – 6th century AD) are not impressive. Between 1932 and 1933, two Roman coins (one bronze) were discovered in Bolesławice, which were in private possession and are now considered lost. Much earlier (1820) a Roman denarius with a spear blade was discovered in Bolesławiec, followed in 1941 by a denarius of Gordian III from the years 238–244. These coins may prove the existence of a trade route in the area as early as the first half of the 1st millennium. What draws attention, however, is the discovery of a settlement (pottery) of the Luboszycki culture in Bolesławiec. Slightly further north of the city, in Parkoszów, a cemetery of this culture was found with five graves equipped with pottery and fragments of corpses as well as melted glass and a fragment of a comb. It is thought that settlement during this period occupied a small area along the Beaver River.

=== Bolesławiec in medieval Poland ===
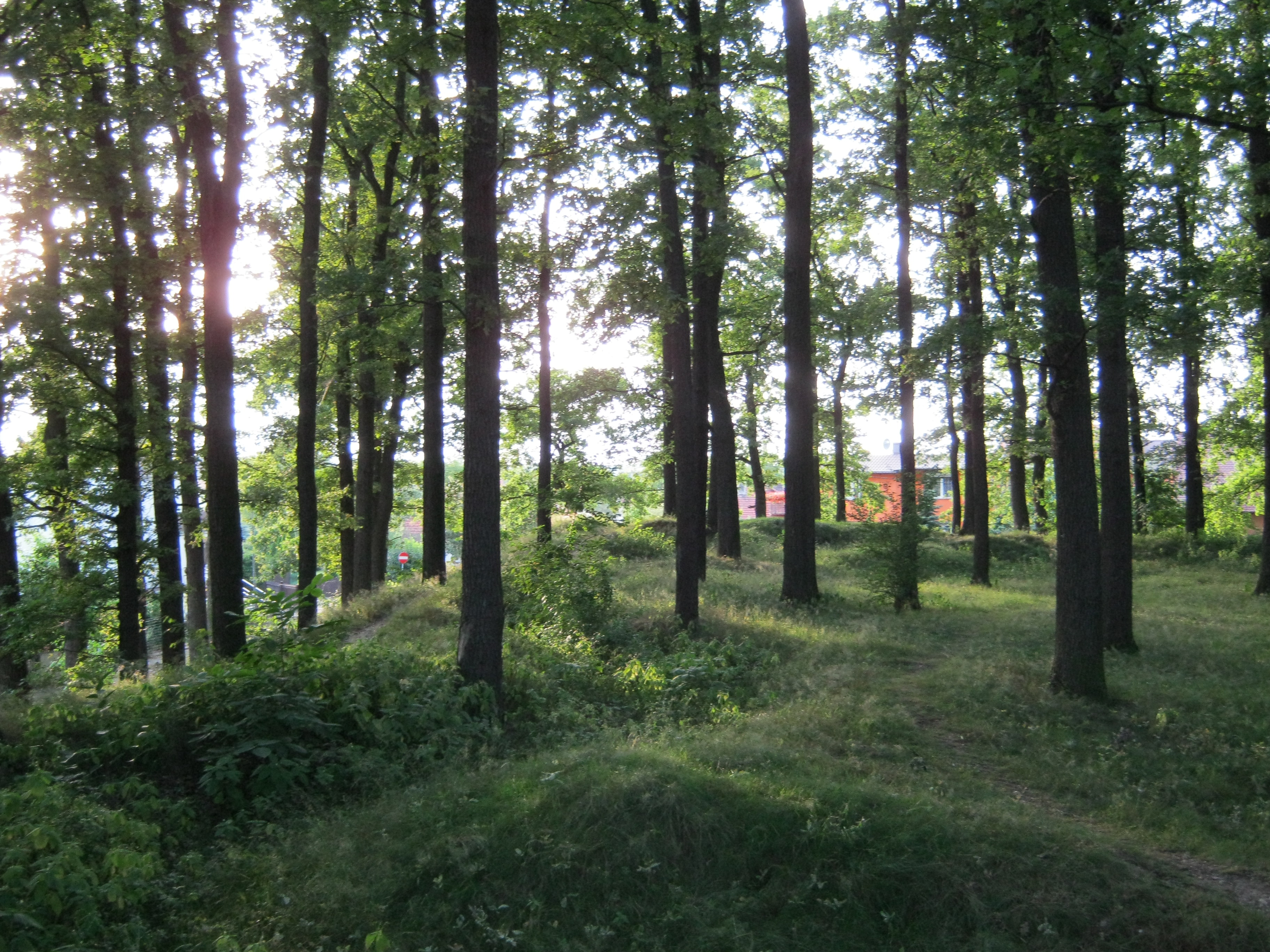
Former medieval stronghold in Bolesławiec

The Slavs arrived in Silesia in the 7th century, but no traces of their residence at that time have been found in the Bolesławiec area, nor have the remains of the so-called Sukow-Szeligii culture, which covered, inter alia, Western Pomerania, Mecklenburg, Brandenburg, Lusatia, Płock Mazovia, Greater Poland, Silesia and probably temporarily southern Lesser Poland. It occurred in the northern areas of Lower Silesia near Ślęza. The settlement situation in the Bolesławiec area in the 8th century is similarly unclear. According to some researchers, this area was part of the Tornow-Klenica zone, which included part of Lusatia, the Lubusz Land, part of Greater Poland and the northern territories of Lower Silesia. As before, sites confirming that Bolesławiec belonged to this zone have not yet been discovered. The first finds confirming the existence of a settlement in Bolesławiec at the turn of the 8th and 9th centuries are extremely valuable due to their form. This is because the end of a belt of the so-called Blatnica type was found, coming from the Blatnica-Mikulżice zone dated to 790–830. It is distinguished by wares created after the fall of the Avar caganate, referring to Western wares. The end of the belt found in Bolesławiec has Carolingian features. The spur found, on the other hand, is an imitation of early Carolingian wares. Thus, Bolesławiec is located on the border of the Early Carolingian influence, covering the Elbe Slavs, and then a belt east of the Oder and Lusatian Neisse up to Bolesławiec, and then as far as the Ślęza region and in a south-western direction covering Bohemia. An extremely important find is an iron bowl of the so-called Silesian type. Recently, it has been increasingly regarded as the original form of non-ruble money, which was superseded in Moravia and Malopolska by its more perfect form - the axe-like fine. The Bolesławiec bowl is the westernmost find of a fairly compact zone of such products in Silesia. After Silesia entered the circle of influence of the Great Moravian state, the Great Moravian influence, which is evident in the neighbouring Třebovian or Dziadoszan areas, did not reach the Boleslav region. Similarly, the Bohemian influences evident in the first tribe did not reach here.

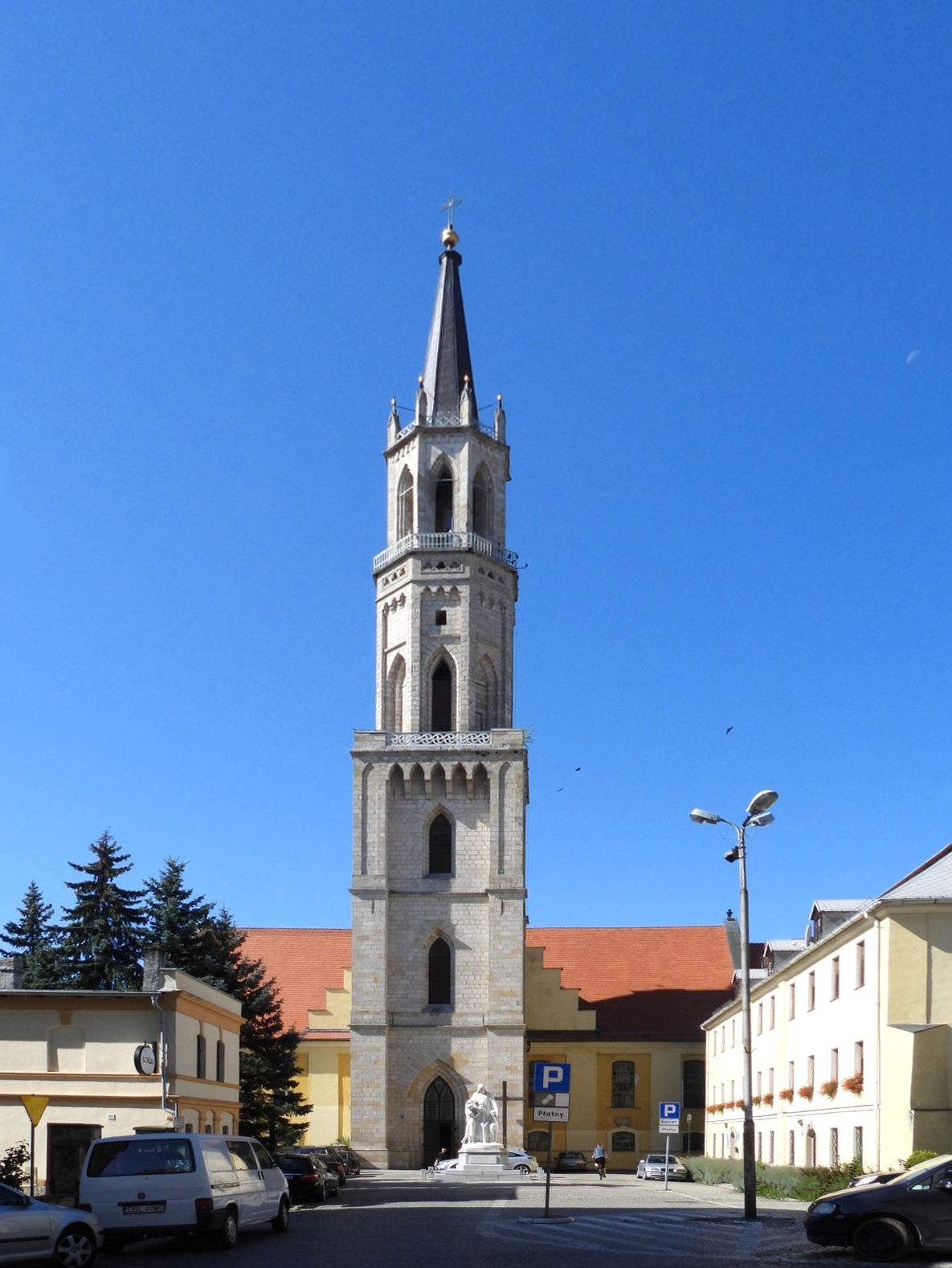
Plac Zamkowy (Castle Square) - a castle tower to which the Church of Our Lady of Perpetual Help was added

The situation regarding settlement in Silesia in the 10th-11th centuries becomes somewhat clearer when one turns to written sources. In the light of these, the Bobrzan tribe spread to the west of the Trzebowians and Dziadoszan, in the middle Beaver basin. Their presence here is attested only by the so-called Praga document of 1086, which is admittedly suspect, but the data contained therein are generally accepted to correspond with the situation in 973. It states that the northern boundaries of the Prague bishopric are marked by the Trebouane (Trzebowians), Pobrane (Bobrzanians) and Dedosize (Dziadoszanians) tribes, which border the Miliczanians through the forest. Of these, only the Bobrzans could actually border the Miliczans. The name of this tribe clearly indicates that their headquarters should be sought on the Beaver River. Archaeological research has confirmed the existence of a larger settlement cluster between Szprotawa and Nowogród Bobrzański; it occupied an area of 350–400 km². It is in this area that most researchers situate the Bobrzan settlements. Therefore, Ilua (Iława), mentioned in Thietmar's chronicle, would have been the capital city of the Bobrzans and the settlement of this tribe would have been concentrated around it. Thus, they would have been some small territorial unit of the kind found in Lusatia and the Elbe Serbs, among others. Their tribe may have separated during the territorial development of the Dziadoszans, by whom they were reabsorbed. In political terms, therefore, the Bobrzans were not a tribe, but part of a wider unit. The area around Bolesławiec is covered by an extensive primeval forest, well attested by sources. Archaeological research has shown that settlement in this area in the early medieval period was poorly developed. In fact, the functioning of a fortified settlement was only attested in Otoku, the existence of a fortified settlement in Łagów on the Kwisa River seems less likely. The existence of a stronghold in Bolesławice is admitted in some works. These were probably one of the southernmost Bobrzanski (Dziadoszanski) castles, whose communication with the main settlement centre was provided by the Bóbr and Kwisa rivers. A stronghold on the left bank in the area of Bolesławice, dated before the middle of the 10th century, was located by German archaeologists in the pre-war period as part of surface research. A new survey in 1960 failed to locate the fortress. Thus, the assumption was made that it was completely destroyed at that time. More recent works no longer deal with this fortress, considering it, and probably rightly so, to be a non-existent entity, a product of pre-war German historiography. The poorly attested settlement in this area in the early medieval period was initially due to the existence of a so-called zonal boundary running through a strip of forest between the Lusatian Neisse and the Beaver. With the development of settlement – Silesian on the one hand, and Lusatian-Milczański on the other – in connection with the demarcation of dominant estates, the zonal boundary turned into a linear boundary on the Kwisa and the Bóbr, finally shaped at the turn of the 12th and 13th centuries. The western border of Silesia then became the Kwisa.

According to legends, Bolesławiec was supposed to have been founded in the 10th century, during the reign of Mieszko I. In the area of the present-day Old Town, there were supposed to be three inns serving travellers on the route between Dresden and Wrocław, and there was supposed to be a defensive stronghold near these inns. Archaeological research in 2009 proved that there was a fortified settlement in the northern part of present-day Bolesławiec, on Topolowa Street, as early as the end of the 9th century[2], which suggests that there is a grain of truth in the legend of the three inns. According to the records of the 19th century Bergemann Chronicle, the Bolesławiec stronghold had to defend itself fiercely and victoriously against the invading Czech army in 1094.

As a result of the 12th-century fragmentation of Poland into smaller duchies still ruled by the founding Piast dynasty, it formed part of the duchies of Silesia, Legnica and Jawor until 1392.

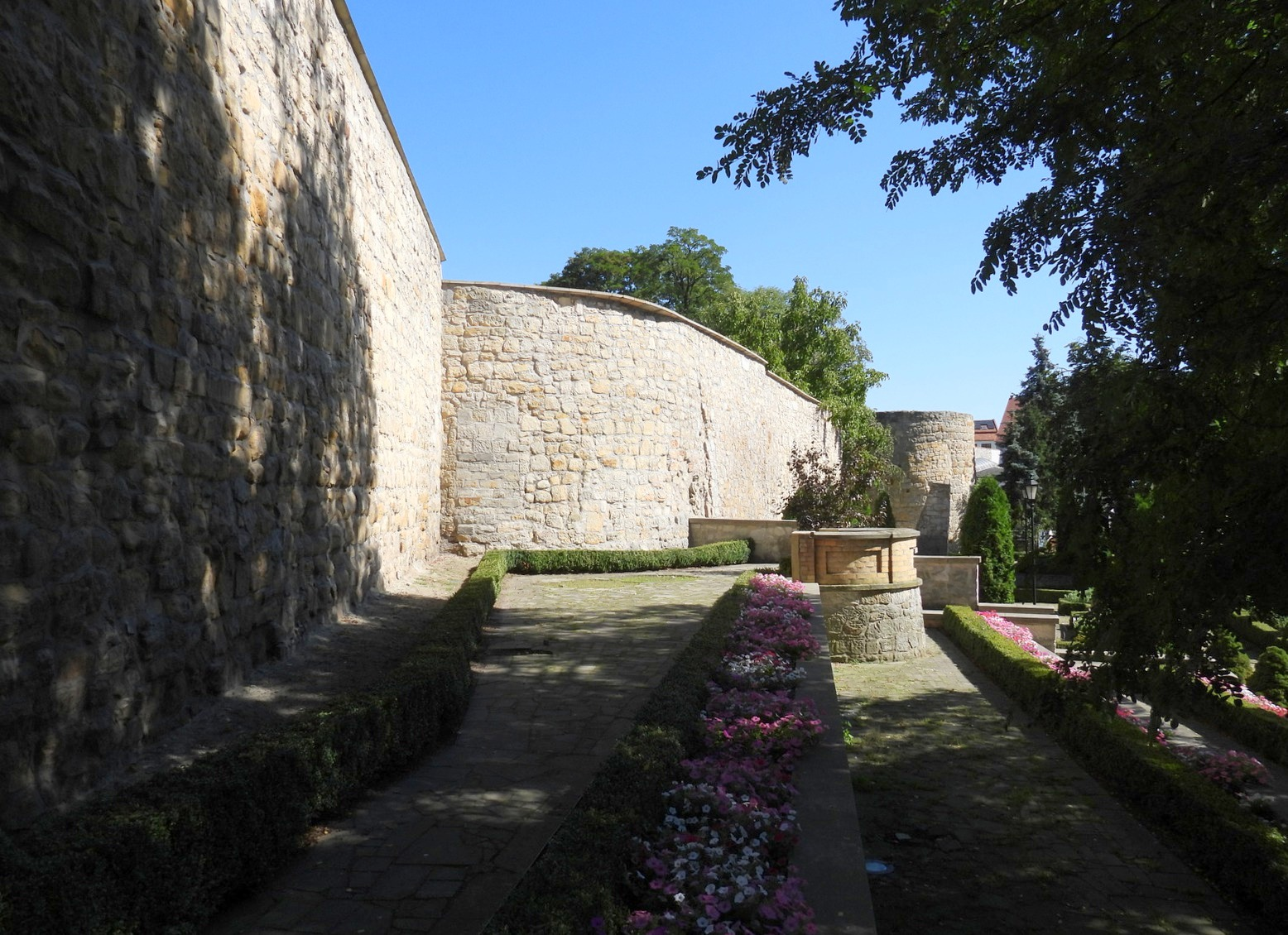
Medieval town walls

However, we do not have the first certain and source-confirmed information about Bolesławiec until around 1194. According to this version, Bolesławiec would have been named after Prince Bolesław Wysoki, who was to establish a settlement on the site of the present-day Old Town. It is very possible that St Dorothy's Church was already founded at that time, and over time it was replaced by the present Church of the Assumption of the Blessed Virgin Mary and St Nicholas, which is now a minor basilica. According to another legend, it was supposed to be built thanks to the foundation of a merchant from Wrocław, who was saved from a quagmire in the vicinity of Bolesławiec, and the founding of the church was for him the fulfilment of a vow he had made to God in a moment of danger. In the 13th century a Dominican monastery was also founded in the area of today's Armii Krajowej and Teatralna Streets, at the crossroads of today's Prusa and Zgorzelecka Streets there was Our Dear Lady's Church, we also have information about the existence of St Jadwiga's Church and the so-called Funeral Church, which was located in the cemetery in today's Garncarska Street. From the 14th century we also have the first information about a wooden town hall existing in Bolesławiec.

Jews probably lived in Boleslawiec as early as 1190, when the burghers lent a certain amount of money, necessary for the construction of the city walls. In return, they were given their own street and synagogue[3][4].

Bolesławiec was located between 1226 and 1251, precisely in the area of the present Old Town. From this period we no longer have any information about the stronghold at Topolowa Street, which was probably abandoned. The town quickly became Germanised.

In 1361, the number of Jewish inhabitants was 360. Jews owned 31 houses. They were engaged in petty trade, crafts, small services

=== As part of the Bohemian Crown ===
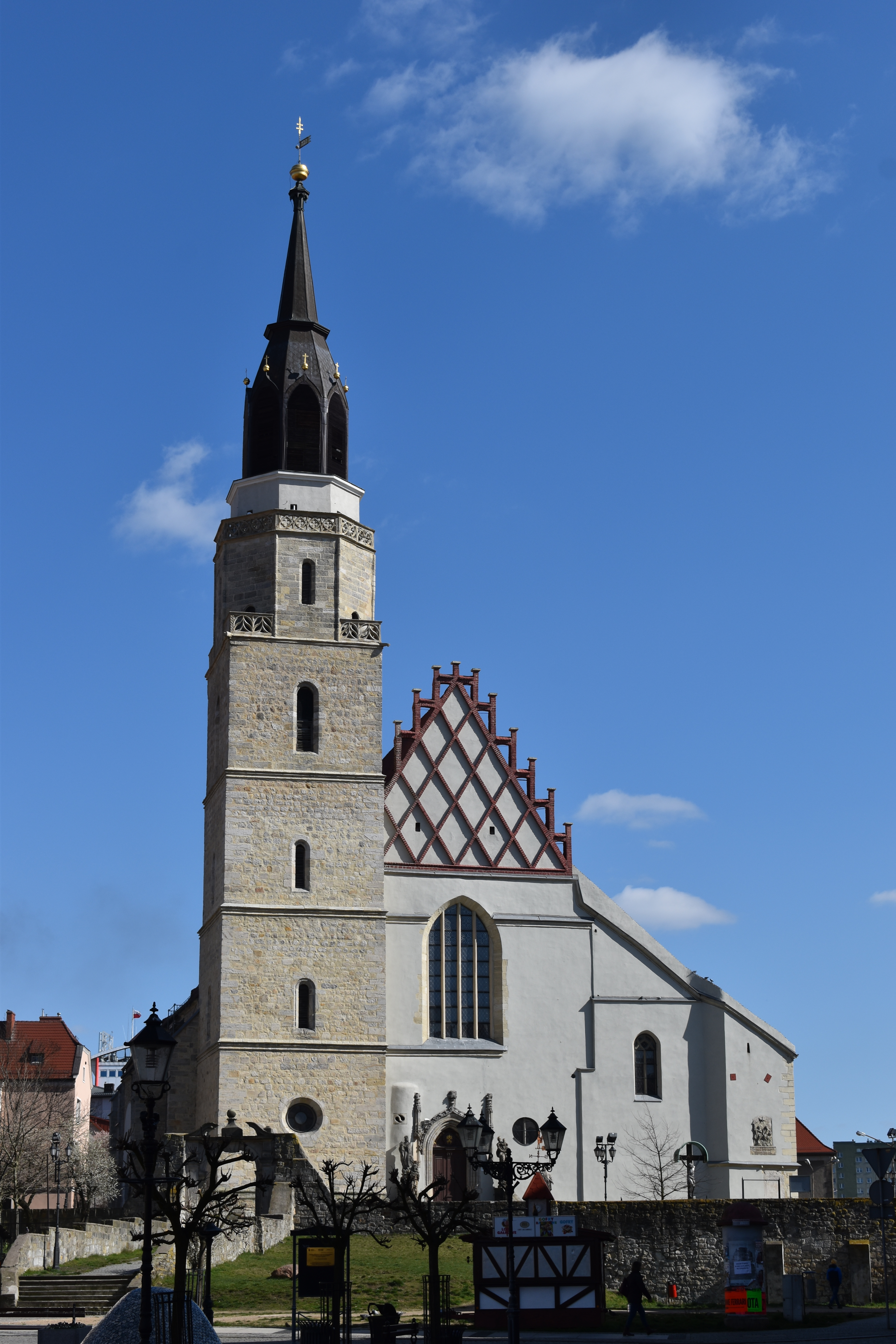
Basilica of the Assumption of the Blessed Virgin Mary and Saint Nicholas in Bolesławiec

In 1392 Bolesławiec, then belonging to the Duchy of Jawor-Swidnica, came under Bohemian rule, as did the whole Duchy. In the 14th century, from the taxes imposed on the Jewish population, the citizens of Bolesławiec financed the construction of the city walls between the Upper Gate and the Nicholas Gate. On 18 June 1429, the city fell victim to a devastating Hussite raid, during which a large number of inhabitants were slaughtered and the whole of Boleslawiec was burnt down. The town was conquered as a result of the treachery of one of the townsmen, who set fire to the Upper Gate, located near the present-day Okrąglak on Piłsudski Square. Bolesławiec faced many years of reconstruction after these events. In 1454, the Jews were expelled from the city. At the end of the 15th century, the expansion of St Mary's Church took place, which resulted in the demolition of St Dorothy's Church. Part of this church was incorporated into the expanding church. Remembrances of this reconstruction have survived to this day in the form of inscriptions, placed in the walls of the basilica. In 1524 Jacob Süssenbach came to Boleslawiec and delivered a moving sermon in St Mary's Church. The sermon caused a large part of the townspeople to convert to the Protestant side. In time, the Dominican monastery was abolished and St Mary's Church was turned into a Lutheran church, a state of affairs that did not change until 1629, when the church was returned to Catholics. The church housed the first known library of Boleslawiec. It was a so-called chain library, consisting of around 150 volumes.

From 1525 the architect Wendel Rosskopf was active in Boleslawiec, who took part in work on the interior of St. Mary's Church (Basilica) and created the so-called Vow Palace, still to this day located in the town hall and until the 20th century serving as the town inn. The Renaissance sgraffito in the lower part of the Town Hall tower has been preserved to this day, around which a copy has been made. A magnificent Renaissance portal, funded by one of Boleslawiec's 16th-century mayors, Paul Hanewald, leads to the Wedding Palace.

Bolesławiec was the birthplace of the German poet of the Baroque period, Martin Opitz, whose small monument has recently been located in Komuny Paryskiej Street. Opitz was one of the prominent representatives of the so-called Silesian poetic school, which had an enormous influence on German literature in the first half of the 17th century. Another well-known poet from this school, a native of Boleslawiec, was Andreas Scultetus. The city suffered severely during the Thirty Years' War, when Swedish troops passed through Bolesławiec more than once, leaving ruins in their wake. In addition, in June 1623, the city was hit by a major plague epidemic that led to deaths Despite the great destruction, the city managed to recover from the losses it had suffered, as evidenced by the subsequent rebuilding of the interior of St Mary's Church, during which it took on its current Baroque shape. In the 18th century, one of two main routes connecting Warsaw and Dresden ran through the town, and Kings Augustus II the Strong and Augustus III of Poland often traveled that route.

=== Bolesławiec in Prussian and German times ===
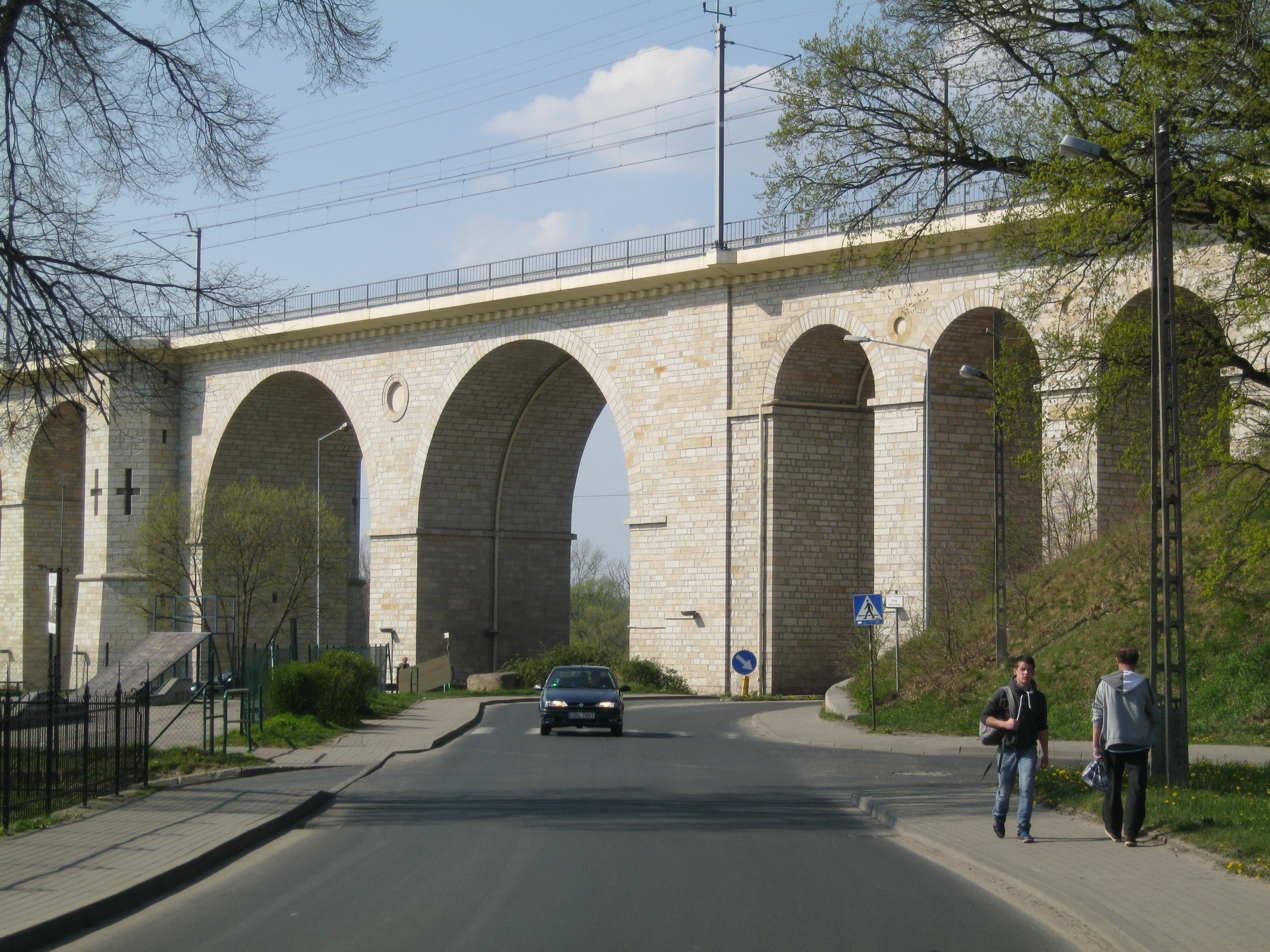
Railway viaduct

During the Silesian Wars, the town came under Prussian rule. In 1745, a graphic depicting the city of that time in detail was created by Friedrich Werner. It shows that the town occupied only a small part of its present area, bounded by medieval fortification walls. In the centre was the market square with the town hall, to the right of which was the parish church, the present basilica. The city had three gates - the Upper Gate (the area of today's Piłsudski Square), the Lower Gate (the area of today's Thermal Baths in Zgorzelecka Street) and the Nicholas Gate (located near the place where the intersection of Kutuzowa, Kubika and Komuna Paryska Streets is now). The city also had small suburbs in the area of the present Asnyka and Komuny Paryskiej Streets, and in the place of the present Defenders of Hel Park there was an Evangelical cemetery (surviving until the second half of the 20th century). In the area of today's Castle Square one can still see the remains of a medieval castle, burnt down during the Thirty Years' War, and in whose place an Evangelical church was built ten years later. In the second half of the 18th century an orphanage was opened in Boleslawiec, the buildings of which are still preserved today in Bankowa Street. The orphanage had a printing press, which, among other things, published scientific works.

In 1812, after the emancipation edict, Jews began to settle in the town again. In 1823, a prayer room was set up in the house of the widow Böhm at the then Kirchplatz

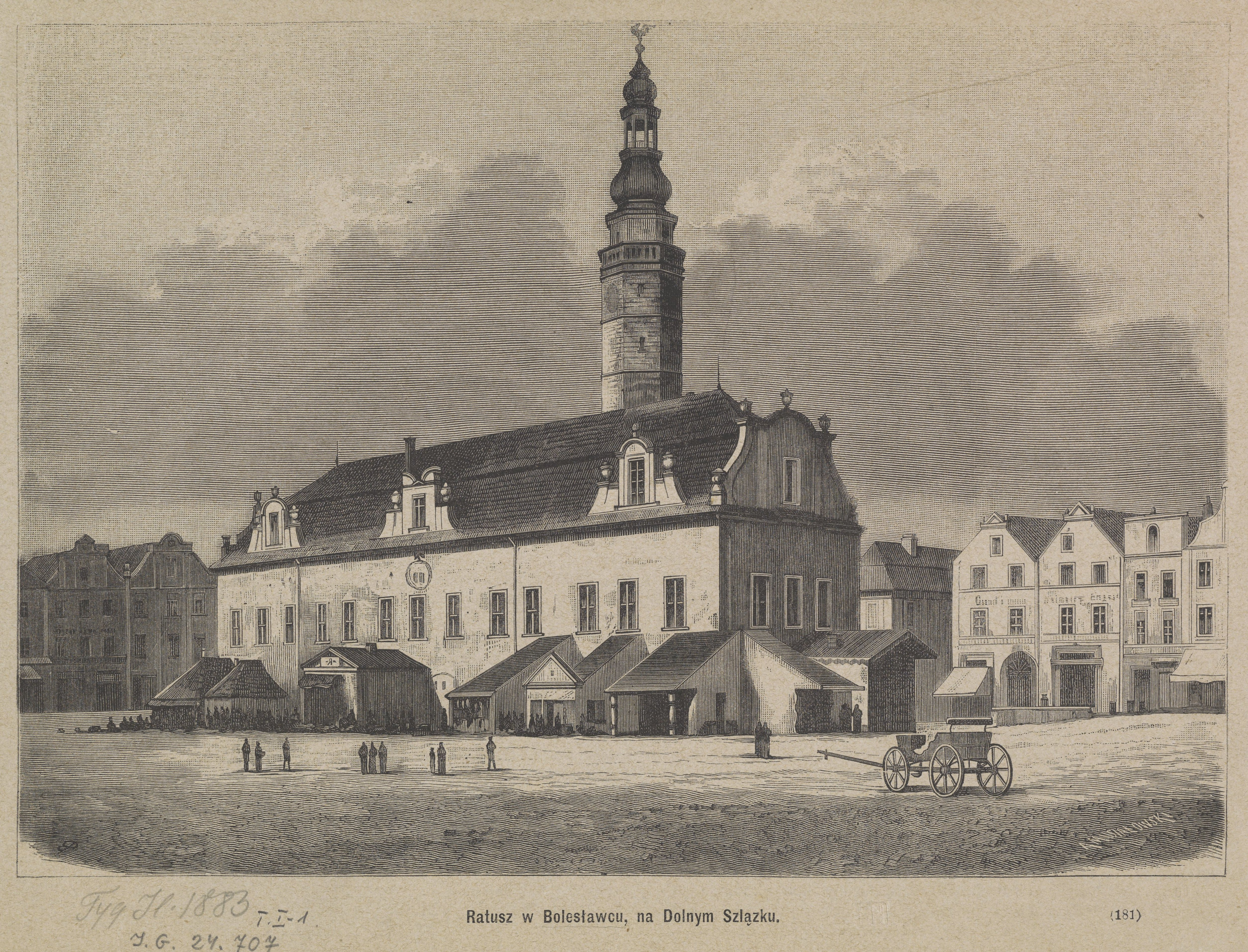
Town hall in the 1880s

Napoleon Bonaparte visited the town six times during the Napoleonic wars, and Mikhail Kutuzov, the Russian Field Marshal, died here on 28 April 1813. The house in which he died has been presenved to this day and now houses the City History Department of the Boleslawiec Ceramics Museum. A few months after his death, in August 1813 the Russo-French battle for Bolesławiec took place, ending with the expulsion of the French from the city. After the end of the war, Bolesławiec, whose defensive walls were partially destroyed by the French army began to develop dynamically. On 1 October 1845 a railway station was opened in the town, and a year later a large railway viaduct, one of the longest in Europe, was opened Soon afterwards a histonc complex of a psychiatric hospital was built between the current Piast and Tysiąclecia Streets, where the Provincial Hospital for the Nervous and Mentally ill now operates. Many Bolesław citizens took part in the Franco-Prussian War and in the battles of the First World War. The latter were commemorated with monuments: In the Evangelical church and in the municipal forest in the present Jelenlogórska Street (both no longer extant). Despite these wars, the city developed intensively - new streets were built, a suburban railway and a city theater were opened.

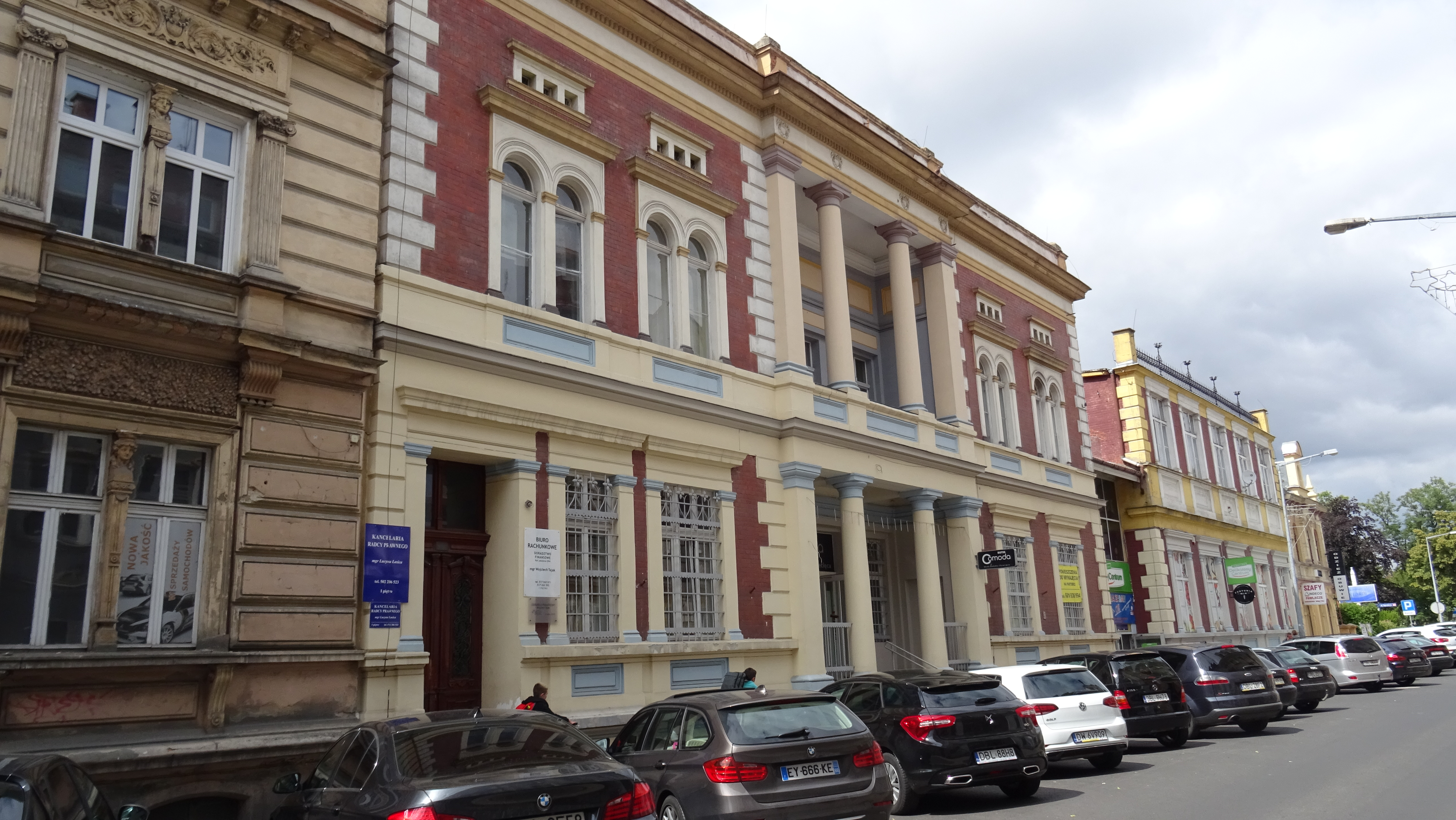
The former Fernbach printing house at ul. Mickiewicza

A very important place on the pre-war map of Bolesławiec was the printing house of the Royal Orphanage, managed from 1872 by a printer of Jewish origin from Bolesławiec, Louis Fernbach. The Fernbach family managed the printing house until 1942 and during that time made it a very important printing center throughout Germany. The Fernbachs published a number of books and leaflets in Bolesławiec, but the newspapers brought them the greatest fame. In addition to the city newspaper Bunzlauer Stadtblatt, the printing house also published specialized newspapers - the most famous title was Der Photograph, which was published on a global scale. The Fernbachs were finally dispossessed of their property in 1942 by the Nazi authorities.

In 1913, the "Metropol" cinema was opened in Bolesławiec. Changes in Bolesławiec took place after Adolf Hitler took power in the Reich. The current Bolesława Chrobrego Street was named Adolf Hitler Strasse, and the NSDAP and Gestapo were established in the city. In April 1933, a boycott of Jewish stores in the city was carried out - uniformed SA officers took photos of people who wanted to shop there. After the Nuremberg Laws came into force, Jews were removed from state positions, organizations and associations. During Kristallnacht on November 9–10, 1938, Jewish businesses were looted and the synagogue was set on fire. During the war, Nazi propaganda plays were staged in the Bolesławiec theater for some time, and the people of Bolesławiec fought, among others, during the invasion of Poland.

==== World War II ====
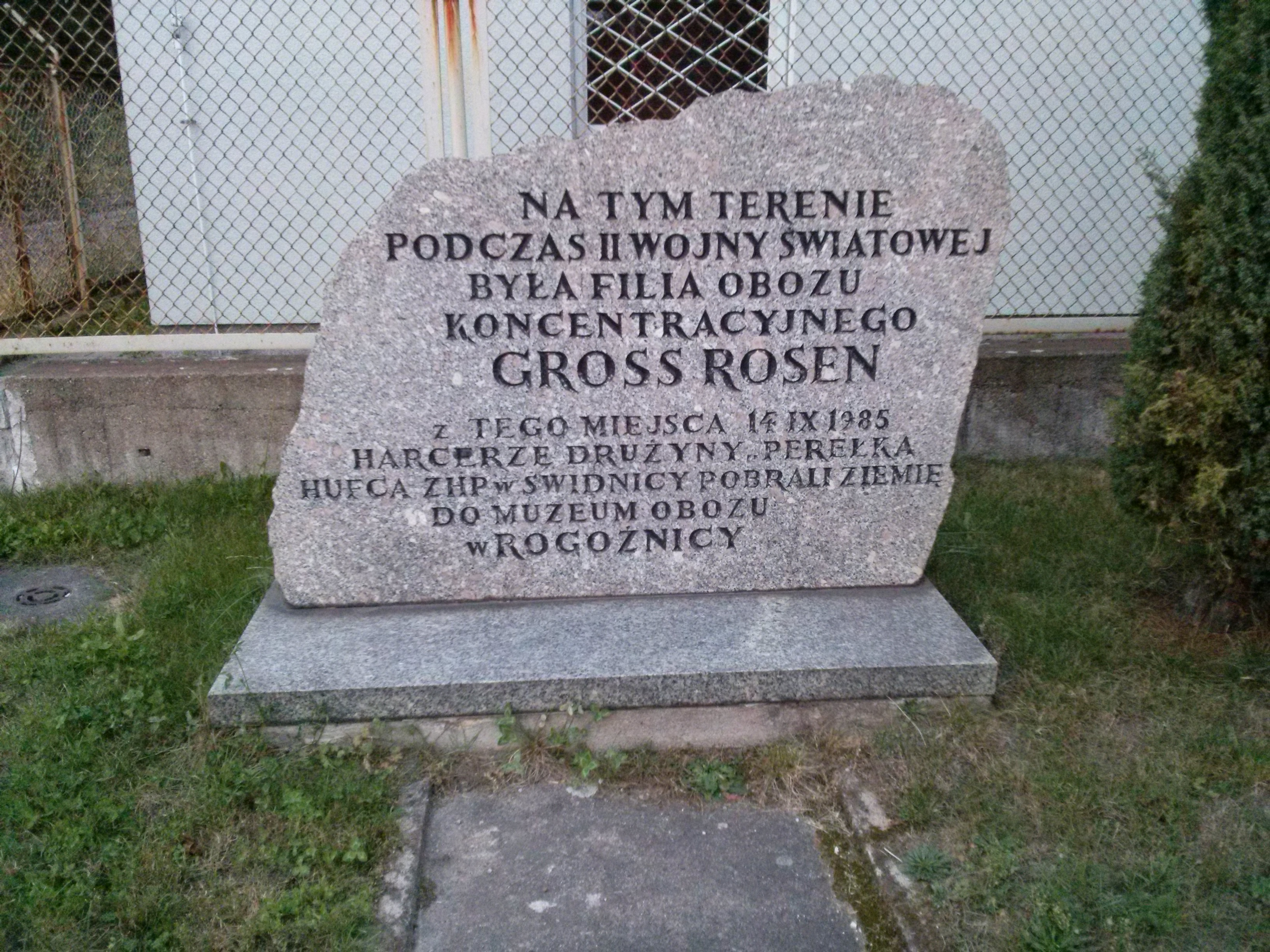
Memorial at the site of a subcamp of the Gross-Rosen concentration camp

Polish forced laborers worked around the city. During the war, the parish priest of St. Mary's Church, Father Paul Sauer, spoke out against the Nazis' actions.

During World War II, the Germans established two subcamps of the Gross-Rosen concentration camp in the town. One, at the current Staroszkolna 18 street was established in May 1944 on the basis of the camp of Jewish prisoners subordinated to Organization Schmelt, which had already existed in 1942. For almost the entire period of its existence, 1,000-1,200 Jews were imprisoned there, mainly Polish and Hungarian. They worked in several local arms factories. The second camp, at the current Orla street, was intended for approximately 650 non-Jewish prisoners, mostly Poles, but also citizens of the Soviet Union and other countries. They worked and lived at the Concordia factory, producing parts for combat aircraft. As Soviet army units were approaching the city, on February 11, 1945, prisoners from both camps who were able to walk were evacuated by the Germans in a death march to the Mittelbau-Dora concentration camp in Thuringia. 541 prisoners out of about 800 Jewish prisoners and 441 out of about 600 non-Jewish prisoners endured this march. A small number of patients from both camps were left there and waited to be liberated by Soviet soldiers.

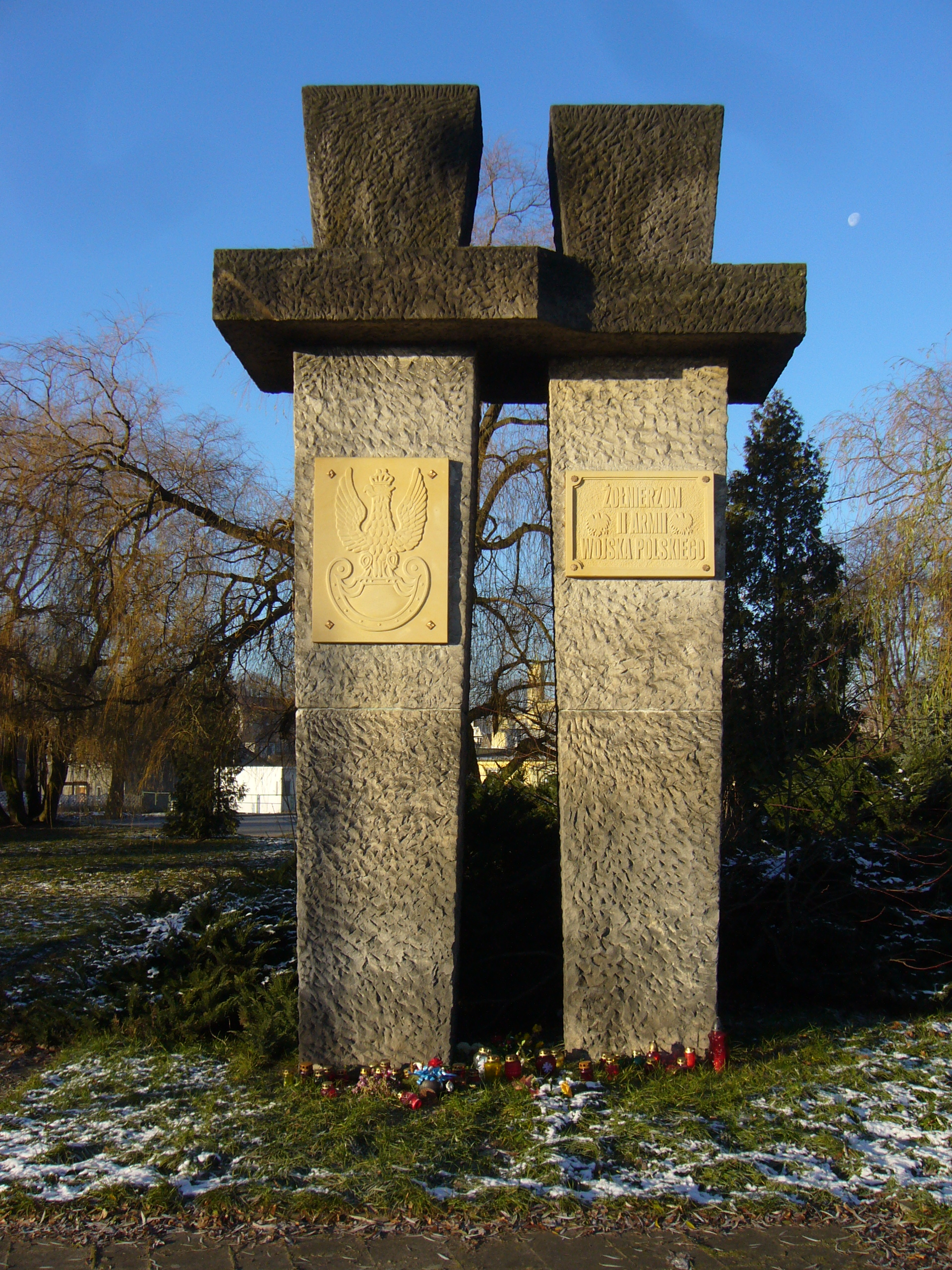
Polish Second Army Memorial

After fighting with German troops, the city was captured on February 12, 1945 by the 7th Guards Tank Corps of the 3rd Guards Tank Army and the troops of the 52nd Army belonging to the 1st Ukrainian Front.

The city was seriously damaged by the Soviets after the capitulation of the Third Reich. Robberies, rapes and arson were common back then and Bolesławiec lost many monuments irretrievably. Almost all historic tenement houses standing on the town square were burned down, almost all former Dominican buildings on today's Armii Krajowej Street were destroyed, as well as many other tenement houses and public buildings. City cemeteries were desecrated and destroyed, but St. Mary's Church was saved from this fate.

=== Bolesławiec in post-war Poland ===
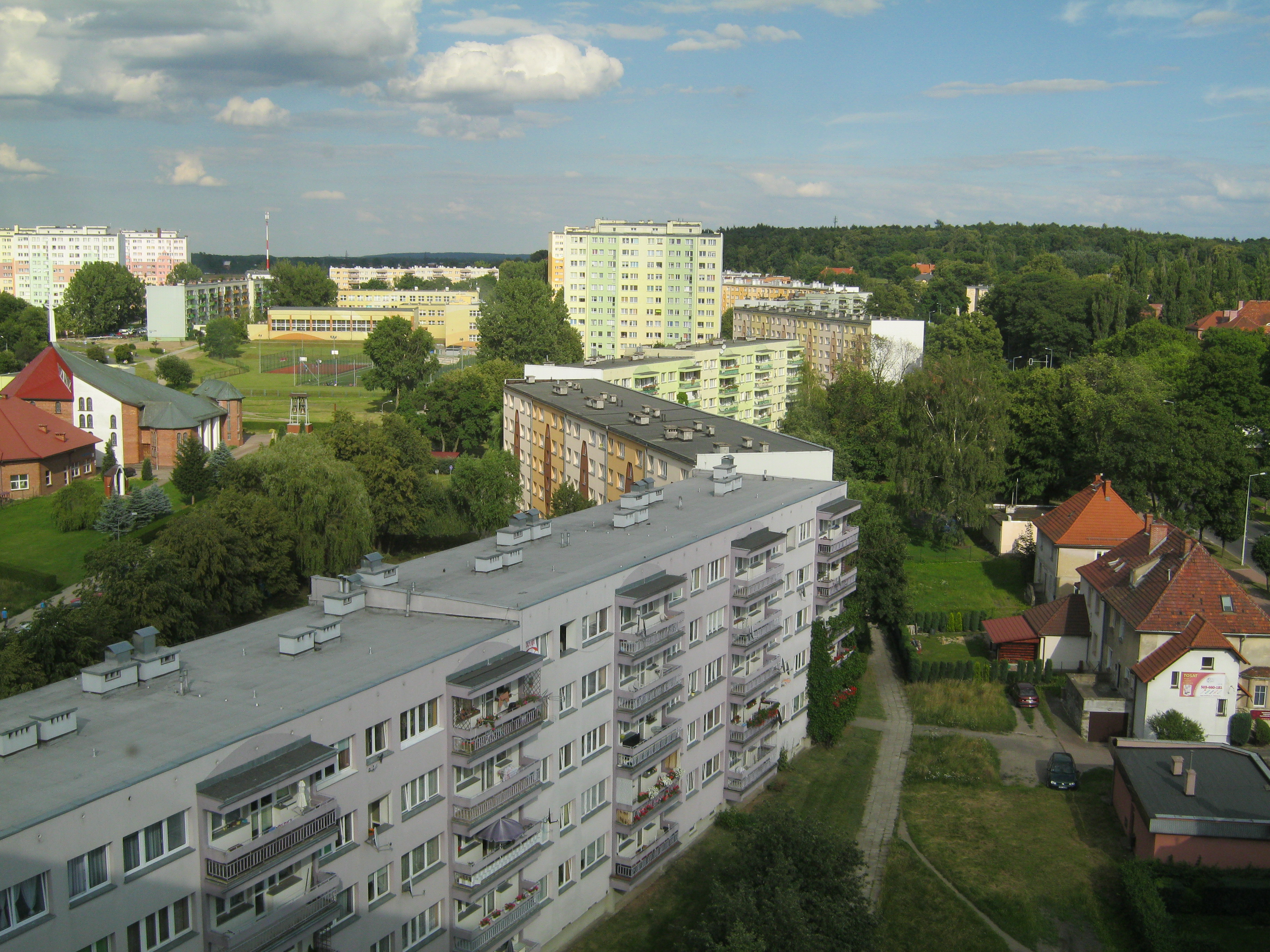
Piastów housing estate in Bolesławiec, view from the skyscraper at ul. John Paul II

After the Potsdam Conference, its German inhabitants were expelled from the city and replaced by displaced persons from the Eastern Borderlands and repatriates from Yugoslavia and France. Numerous Red Army troops were stationed near Bolesławiec (Pstrąże, Świętoszów, Szczytnica, Karczmarka). The city was slowly rebuilt under Polish rule, but many historic tenement houses that could still be saved were demolished. This was the fate of the tenement houses on Asnyka Street, which were replaced by apartment blocks. We managed to prevent the demolition of the former Evangelical church, which was eventually taken over and renovated by the Roman Catholic Church. Gradually, the city began to expand again - the southern part of the large village of Bolesławice was absorbed and new housing estates were created in the eastern part of the city. From 1975 to 1998, Bolesławiec was administratively located in Jelenia Góra Voivodeship. In the 1980s, a student underground group operated in Bolesławiec for some time, printing patriotic leaflets and proclamations, supported by the city's "Solidarity". After the political transformation, the city began to develop even more dynamically - new churches were built, the Youth Cultural Center and the Bolesławiec Cultural Center expanded their activities, numerous renovations and renovations of many places in Bolesławiec were started, with the railway viaduct, the city Planty and the Market Square at the forefront. The gradual restoration of St. Mary's Church, which was elevated to the status of a minor basilica on October 7, 2012, is still ongoing. In 2016, the 1st Secondary School celebrated its seventieth anniversary. Since the 1990s, the Bolesławiec Ceramics Festival has been held in Bolesławiec in the penultimate week of August, attracting tourists not only from Poland, but also from Europe and the rest of the world. On August 18, 2018, a free train of the Lower Silesian Railways, the so-called Ceramic Express. In 2023, the town was awarded the Europe Prize by the Parliamentary Assembly of the Council of Europe.

== Urban layout ==
The city has a very well-preserved medieval street grid surrounding the Baroque town hall. There are tenement houses along the market frontages and old town streets. The city was surrounded by a series of defensive walls with three city gates: "Upper" (at the end of ul. Sierpnia '80), "Mikołajska" (at the beginning of ul. Michała Kutuzowa) and "Dolna" (at the end of ul. Bolesława Prusa).

== Monuments ==
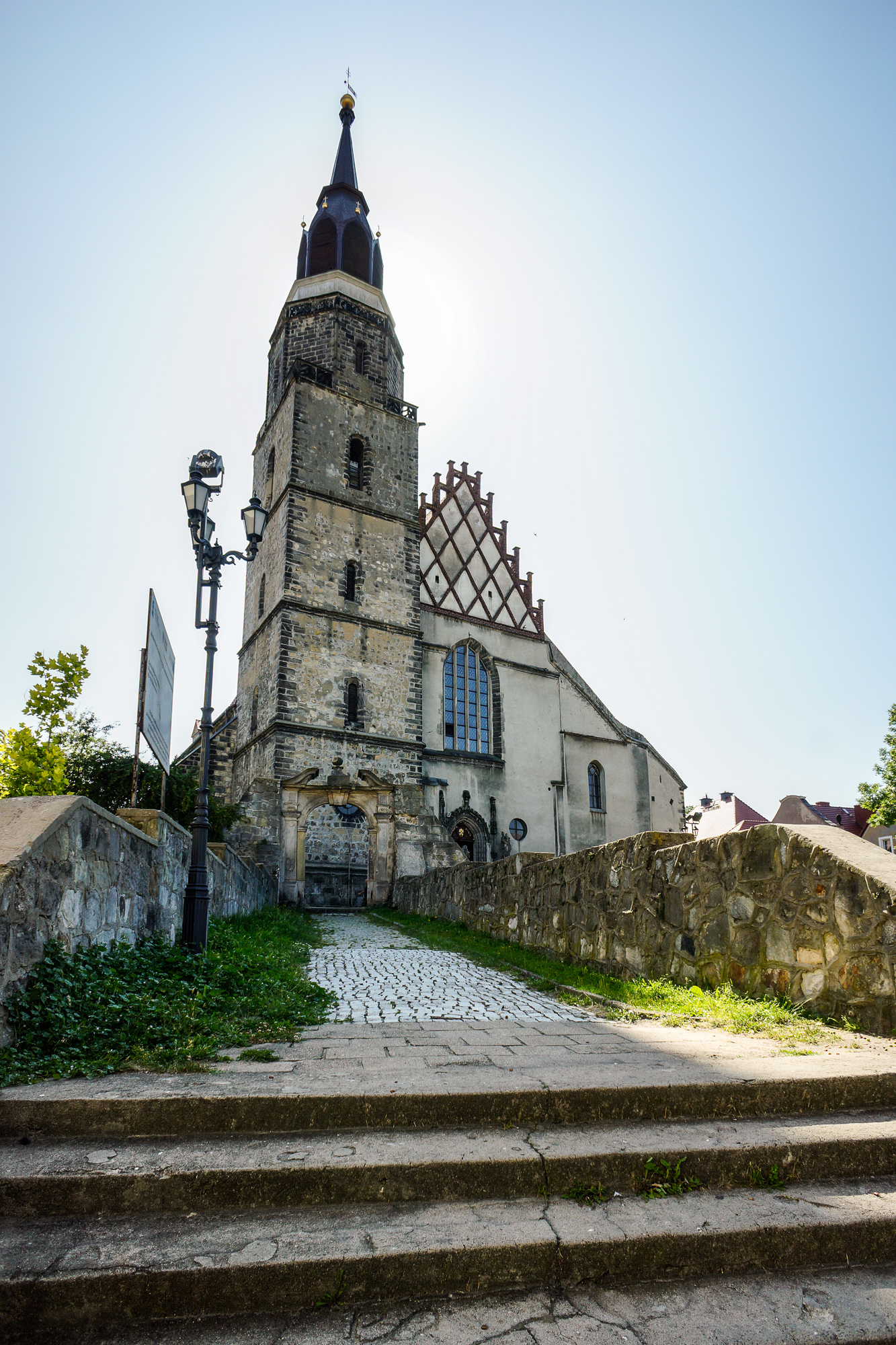
Basilica of the Assumption of the Blessed Virgin Mary and Saint Nicholas

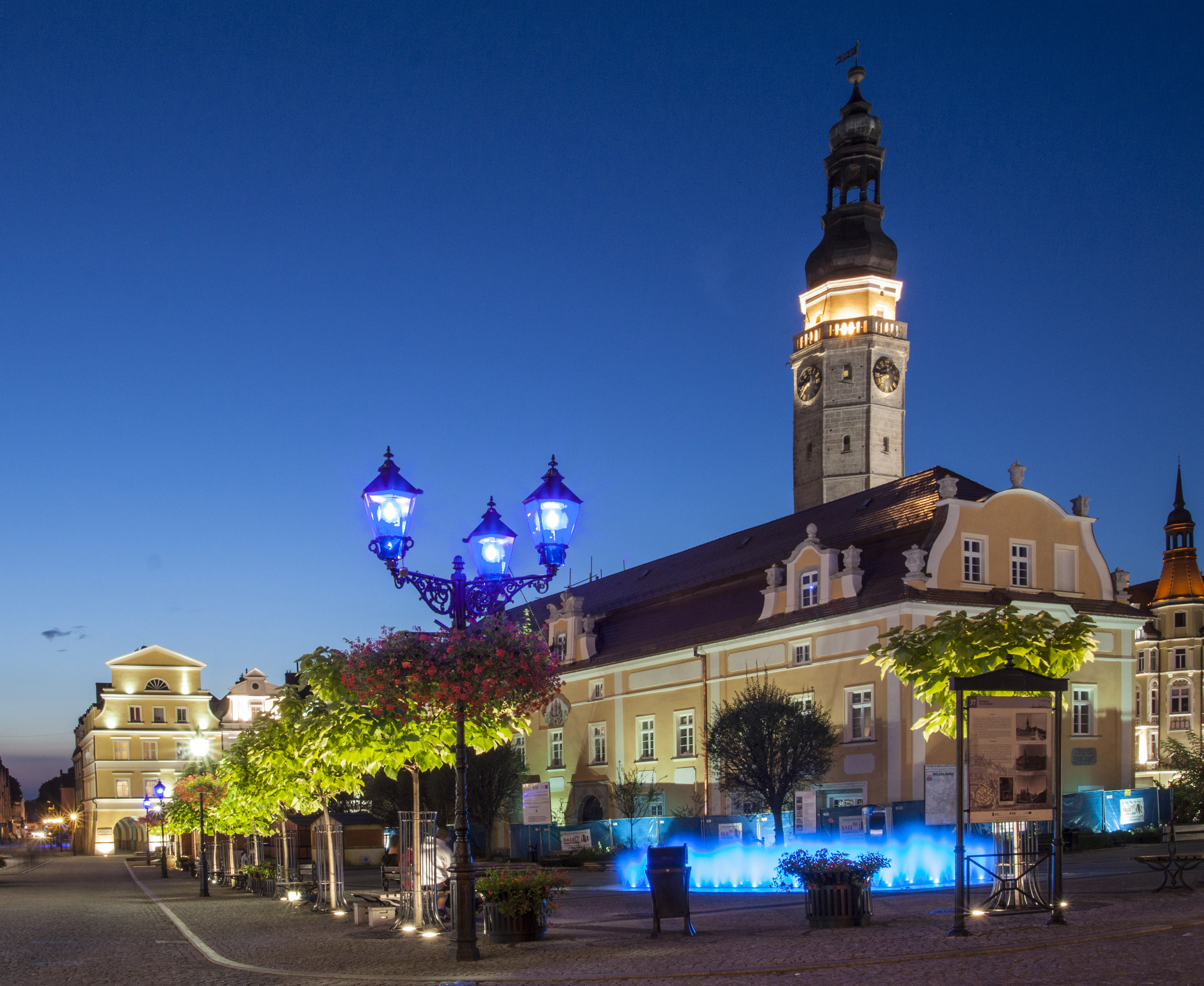
Town hall from the 16th century

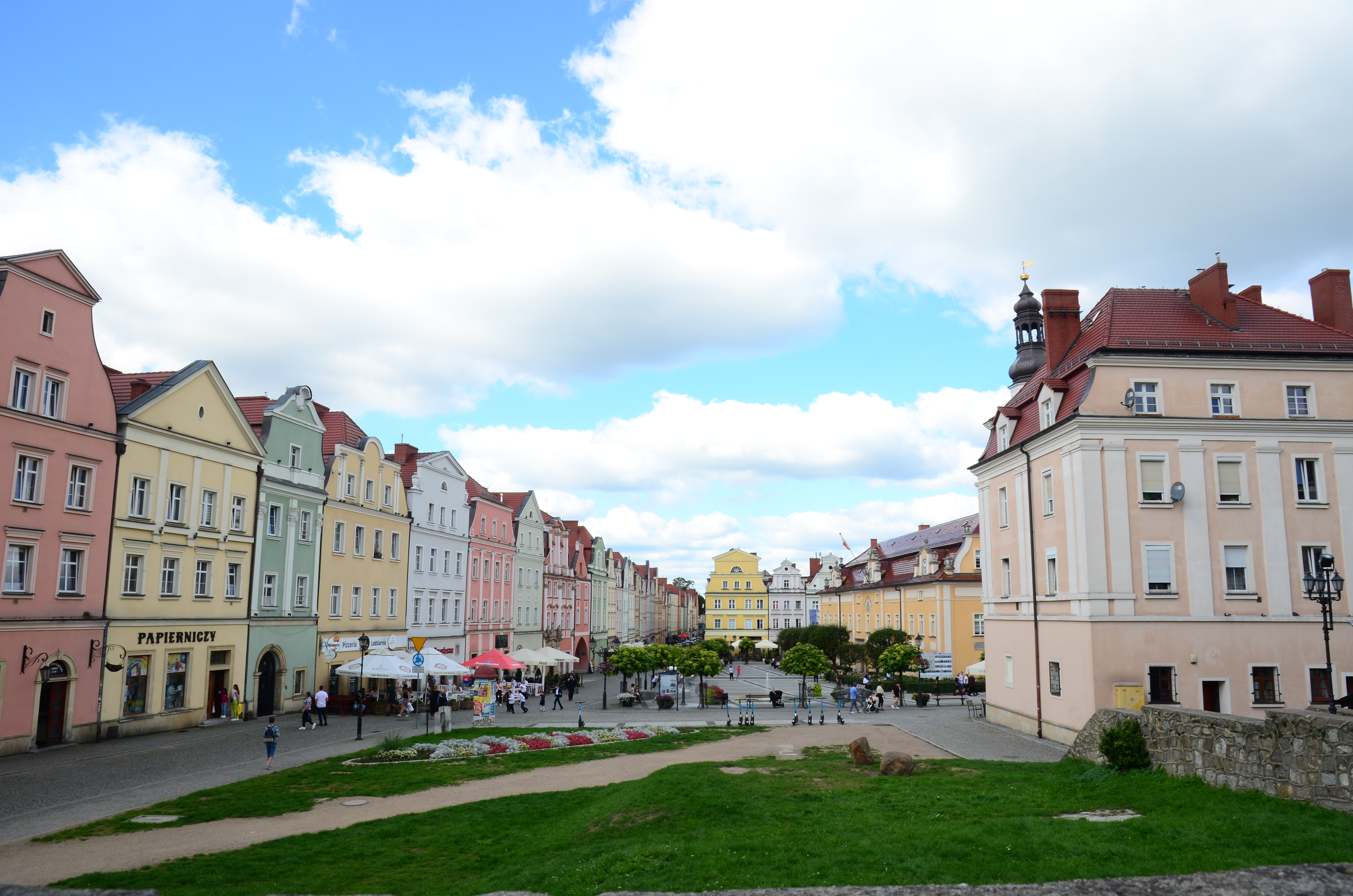
Market Square

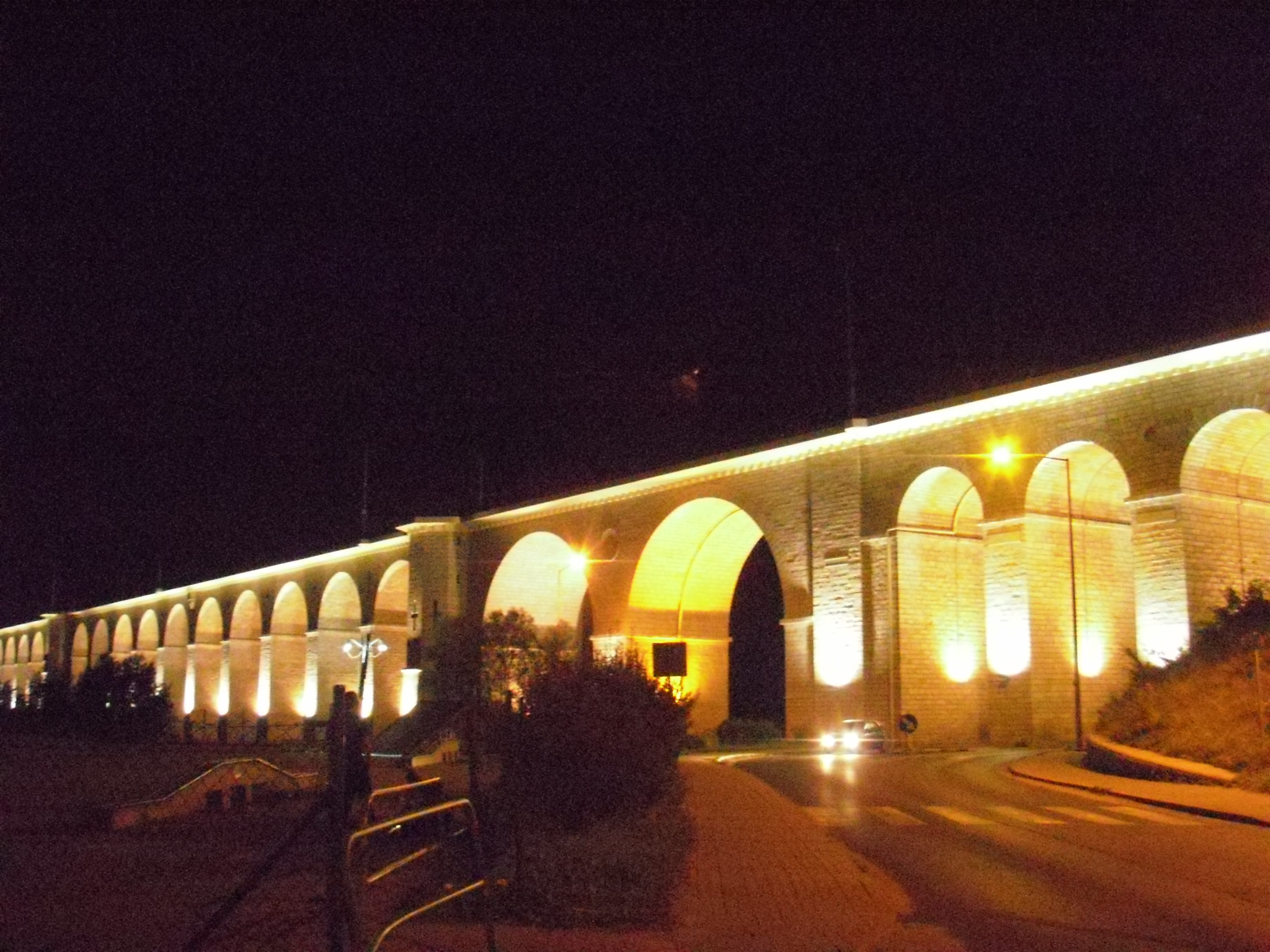
Illumination of the railway viaduct in Bolesławiec

The following are entered in the provincial register of monuments:

- city – historical center
- parish church of Assumption of the Blessed Virgin Mary and Saint Nicholas, from the second half 15th-16th centuries, Marian Sanctuary. Baroque interior by Giulio Simoneti. Particularly noteworthy are the baptismal font and the pulpit from the second half of the 18th century. Inside there is a painting of "Christ Suffering on the Cross" from 1736, painted by J. W. Neunhertz. Around the church there are baroque sculptures made by the designer of the main altar, Jerzy Leonard Weber. At the beginning of the 20th century, a cupola was added to the highest tower of the church. From October 7, 2012 Minor Basilica.
- former evangelical church, currently roman-cat. par. pw. Our Lady of Perpetual Help; late baroque, built in the years 1752–1759 on the site of the prince's castle, which burned down in 1642 and was demolished on the orders of the Swedes, and in the 18th century, at the same time, the pastor's house was built; pl. Zamkowy 1b.
  - the 72 m high tower was built in 1833–1835 according to the design of Friedrich Engelhardt Gansel.
- monastery Dominicans from the second half 18th century; currently offices of the Bolesławiec Rural Commune Office, ul. Theatrical.
- Elizabethan nunnery house from 1907; currently an orphanage, ul. Bolesława Kubika 4.
- historic defensive walls from the 14th century; medieval defensive walls preserved in numerous fragments. They were demolished during the Napoleonic Wars. The Planty belt and the walking route stretch along them. One tower has been preserved, which houses the Bolesławiec Photographic Society.
- chapel by the defensive walls, from the 17th century
- urban plantations created after 1867, changes in the 20th century
- town hall, from 1525, rebuilt in 1781; the current shape of the building was obtained after many reconstructions in 1776. Earlier, in 1522, Wendel Roskopf rebuilt it from the destruction. Currently, the town hall serves as the city hall. The building has one tower. In 2012–2013, the town hall underwent a thorough renovation and regained its former glory.
- Among the tenement houses around the Old Town Square, the following stand out:
  - house Rynek 6, 18th century
  - house "Brama Piastowska", Rynek 7a, from the 17th century, rebuilt in the 19th/20th century.
  - tenement house at Rynek 28, from 1900; currently the "Agora" bookstore, a baroque tenement house where the researcher and traveler K. F. Appun was born
  - house Rynek 29/30 (formerly 28/29), from the end of the 15th century, rebuilt in the 18th and 19th centuries. There is a café "Pod Złotym Aniłem" here; the Renaissance façade is decorated with a rococo bas-relief depicting an angel, carved with the date 1776
  - house 32 Rynek, from the 18th century, rebuilt in the 19th–20th centuries
  - house 35 Rynek, from the 18th century, rebuilt in the 19th–20th centuries.
  - house 38 Rynek, from the 18th century, rebuilt in the 20th century
- house, street Kościelna (formerly Dąbrowszczaków) 3, from 1800
- house, street Kościelna (formerly Dąbrowszczaków) 9, from 1750, rebuilt in 1967
- former city concert hall "Odeon", restaurant, ul. Bolesława Kubika 1, from 1860; in the 19th century, concerts and theater performances were held here
- house, street Michała Kutuzowa 13, from the 18th century.
- "Kutuzov Museum" house, ul. Michała Kutuzowa 14, from the 18th century.
- house, street Piaskowa 18, from 1767
- villa, ul. Grunwaldzka 5, built after 1870
- house, street Jeleniagórska 5a, from 1907
- the building of the branch of the Ceramics Museum in Bolesławiec from 1908, where Mikhail Kutuzov died; built next to one of the towers belonging to the defensive walls

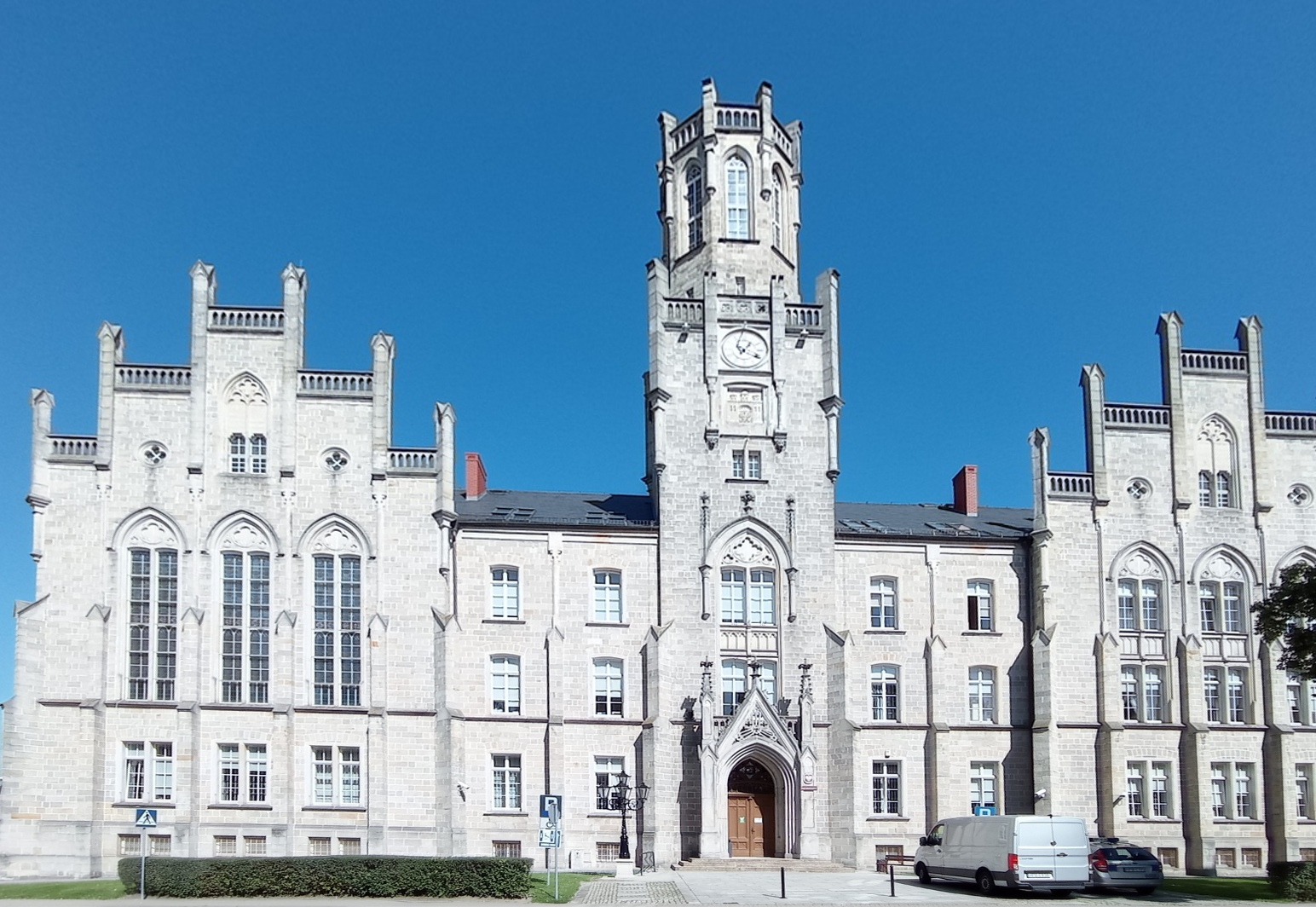
District Court

- junior high school building, ul. Sądowa 1, from 1861–1864 - from the 19th century, built in the neo-Gothic style, initially it served as a junior high school, currently the building houses the District Court
- park next to the junior high school, from 1865, ul. Sądowa – Grunwaldzka – Tamka
- theater, ul. Teatralna 1, from 1885–1886, former municipal arsenal. In 1913 it was rebuilt. Until 1945 he had a permanent acting group. After the war, it was used by the Youth Cultural Center in Bolesławiec. In 2012, its thorough renovation was completed. It is used by acting, dance, literary and music groups of MDK in Bolesławiec and the Bolesławiec district.
- park pavilion, currently a house, ul. Heleny i Wincentego Tyrankiewiczów 1, from the 19th/20th century.
- house, square Zamkowy 2/3, from 1767, rebuilt in the 19th/20th century.
- villa, ul. Zgorzelecka 19, from 1837
- building of the former bathing plant - municipal swimming pool, ul. Zgorzelecka 52, from 1895, rebuilt in 1913–1915, incorporated into one of the towers belonging to the city walls. Under renovation since 2013.
- complex of the "Salteks" textile factory, ul. Orla 3:
  - sewing room with administrative and workshop parts, from 1889, rebuilt in 1927
  - two magazines, from 1889–90
  - knitting shop, from 1925
  - office building, from 1889–90
  - entrance gate with a fragment of a fence, from the beginning of the 19th century 20th century

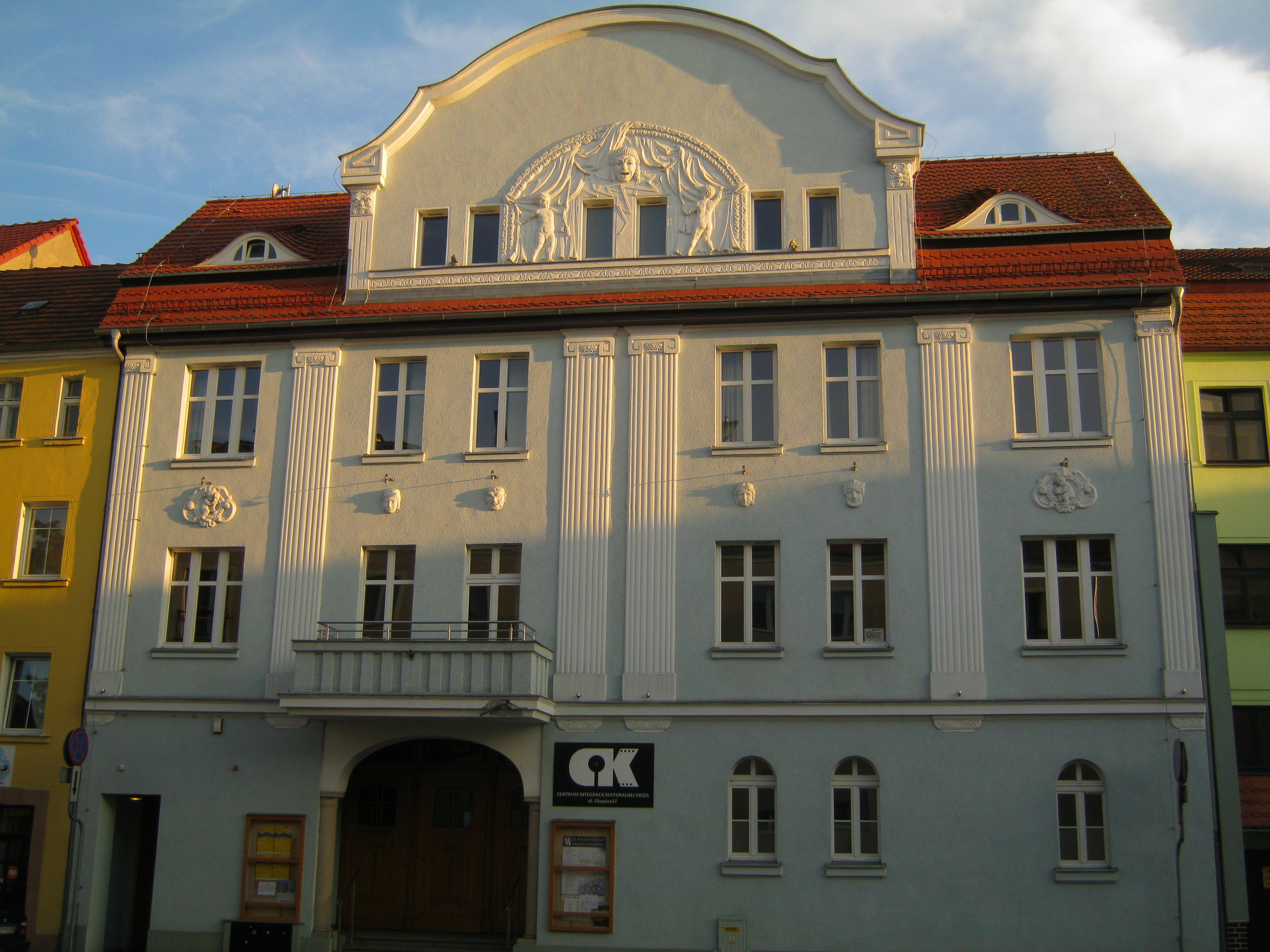
Cultural Integration Center "Orzeł", formerly a cinema.

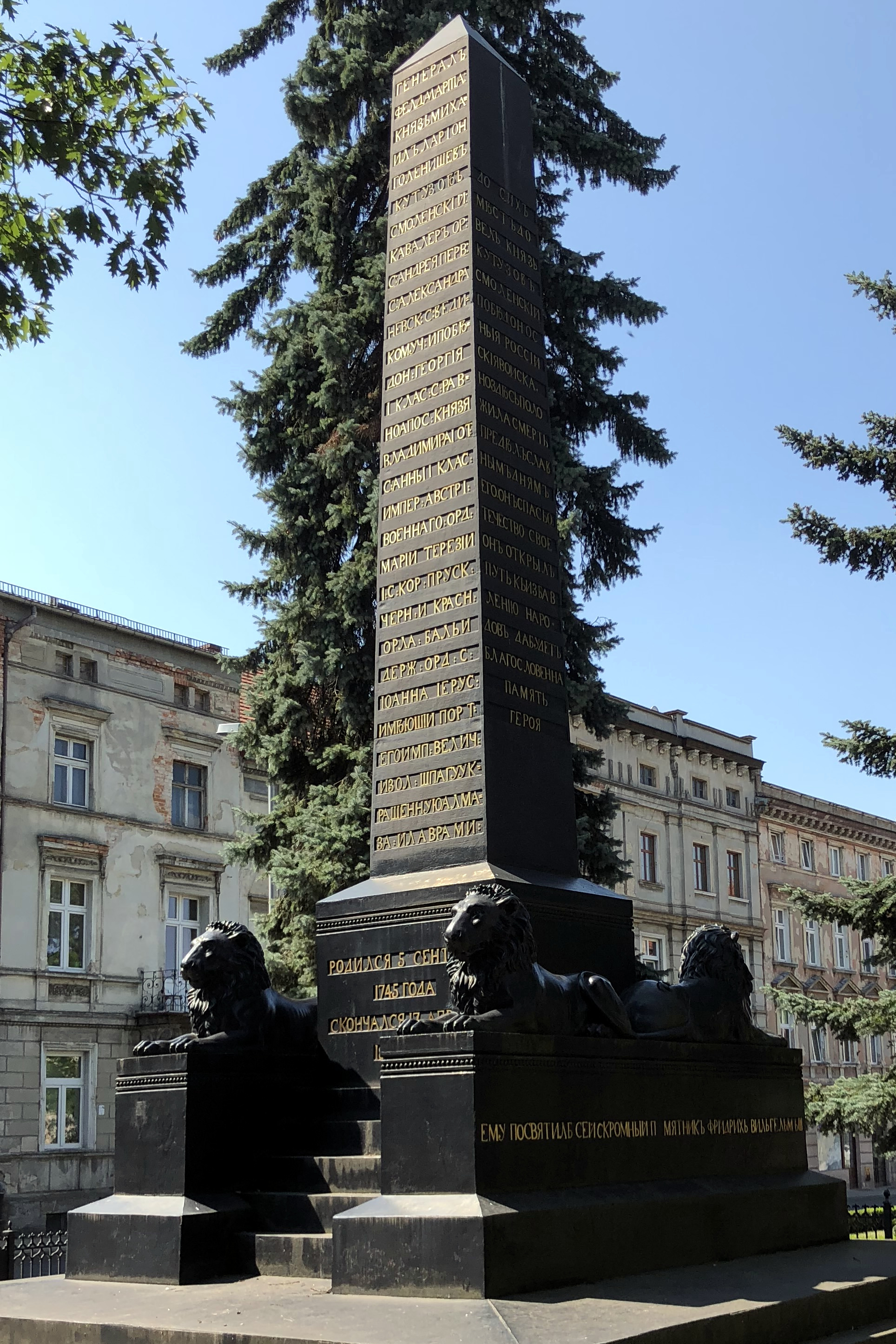
Obelisk dedicated to General Kutuzov

other monuments:

- tenement house at ul. Adama Mickiewicza 1 – at the intersection with ul. August '80; its facade is made of ceramic tiles in the Art Nouveau style and has many plant ornaments
- a pond and an erratic boulder placed here in the middle 19th century to commemorate the construction of the water supply and sewage system in the city, opposite the "Odeon" concert hall, at ul. Bolesław Kubik
- the oldest gymnasium in Bolesławiec, once belonged to the girls' junior high school, at the end of ul. Bolesław Prus. In 2014, it underwent a thorough renovation.
- the building of the municipal arsenal - the Old Theater in Bolesławiec, built in 1822
- a historic monument to Kutuzov in the form of an obelisk - erected in the 19th century in the market square; in 1893 moved to its current location on the promenade at ul. Bolesław Kubik
- cemetery of Russian soldiers from 1812 and 1945 with the heart of Field Marshal Kutuzov embedded in it
- sculpture "Jesus, the friend of children" made of Carrara marble, by P. Breuer, currently standing on the square. Castle
- church Our Lady of the Rosary - is the oldest temple and building in the city. The presbytery was built in the 13th century and completed in the 14th–16th centuries.
- medieval stronghold - register number 186/Arch from 1966-03-10 (site 1)

=== The Way of Saint James ===
The Lower Silesian Way of Saint James runs through the city - a section of the pilgrimage route to the tomb of Saint James in Santiago de Compostela in Spain.

== Pottery ==
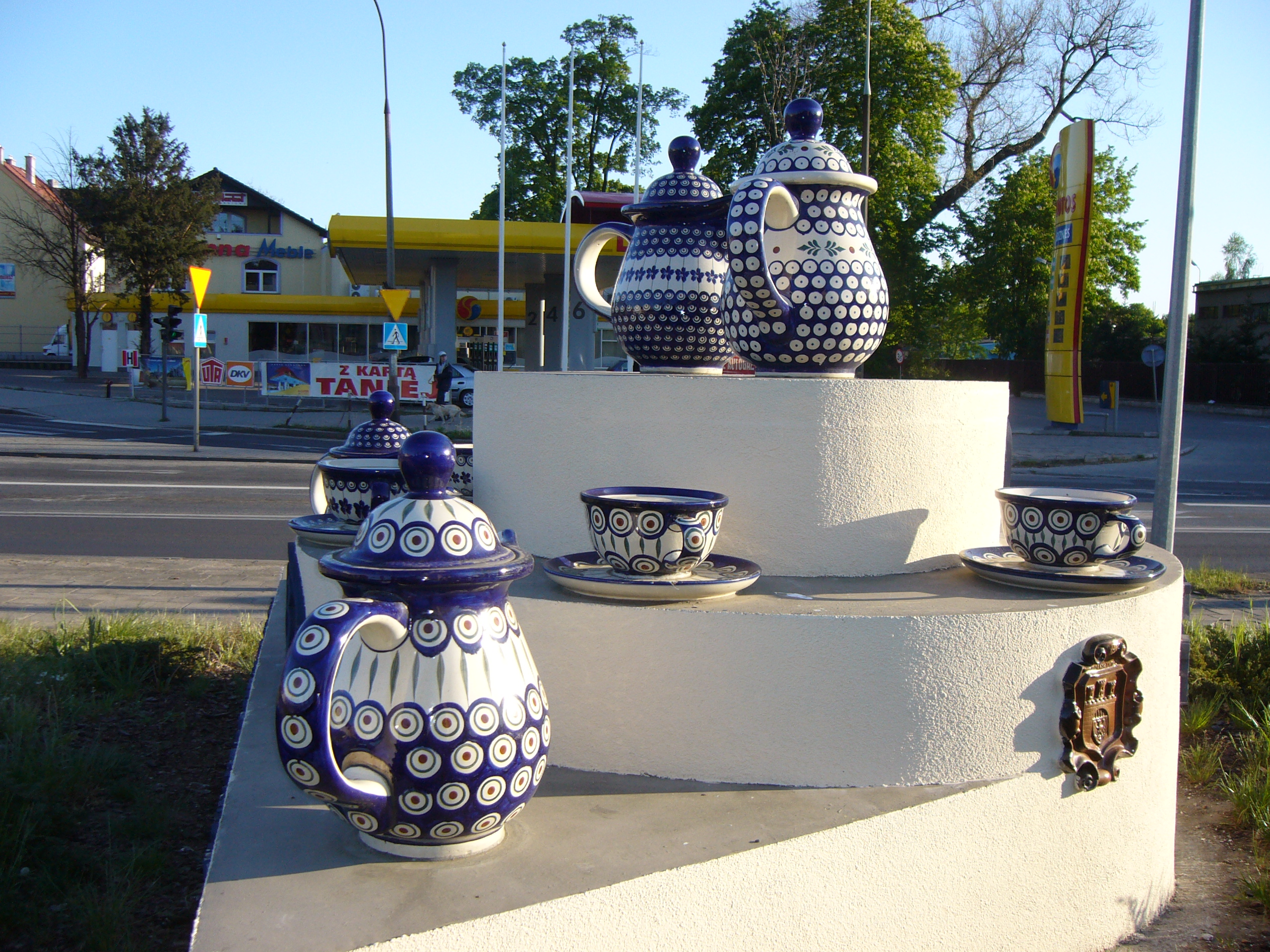
Ceramic from Bolesławiec

The town of Bolesławiec and its satellite communes Nowogrodziec, Ołdrzychów, and Bolesławice have a long ceramic history. The pottery is also identified with the German name for the town: Bunzlau. Bunzlauer ware (Ceramika bolesławiecka) evolved from a folk tradition into a distinct ceramic category distinguishable by form, fabric, glaze, and decoration. The term "Bunzlauer ware" may also be used to describe stylistically-related pottery produced in the neighboring districts of Lusatia and Saxony. Taken as a whole, Bunzlauer ware ranks among the most important folk pottery traditions in Europe.

The area around Bolesławiec is rich in clays suited to the potter's wheel. Typically, utilitarian Bunzlauer pottery was turned on a kick wheel, dried leather-hard, dipped in a slip glaze and then burnt in a rectangular, cross-draft kiln. Although fired at temperatures of up to 1,320 degrees Celsius (2,410 °F) and often classified as stoneware, the clay actually does not vitrify and Bunzlauer pottery is better categorized as high-fired earthenware. In order to make their pottery watertight, Bunzlauer potters applied a coating of liquid clay, or slip. When fired, the slip glaze varied from a chocolate to dark brown. Since the fabric of Bunzlauer ware retains some porosity, the pottery conveniently has been suited for cooking over an open fire or for baking in an oven, as well as for storage.

=== Origins ===
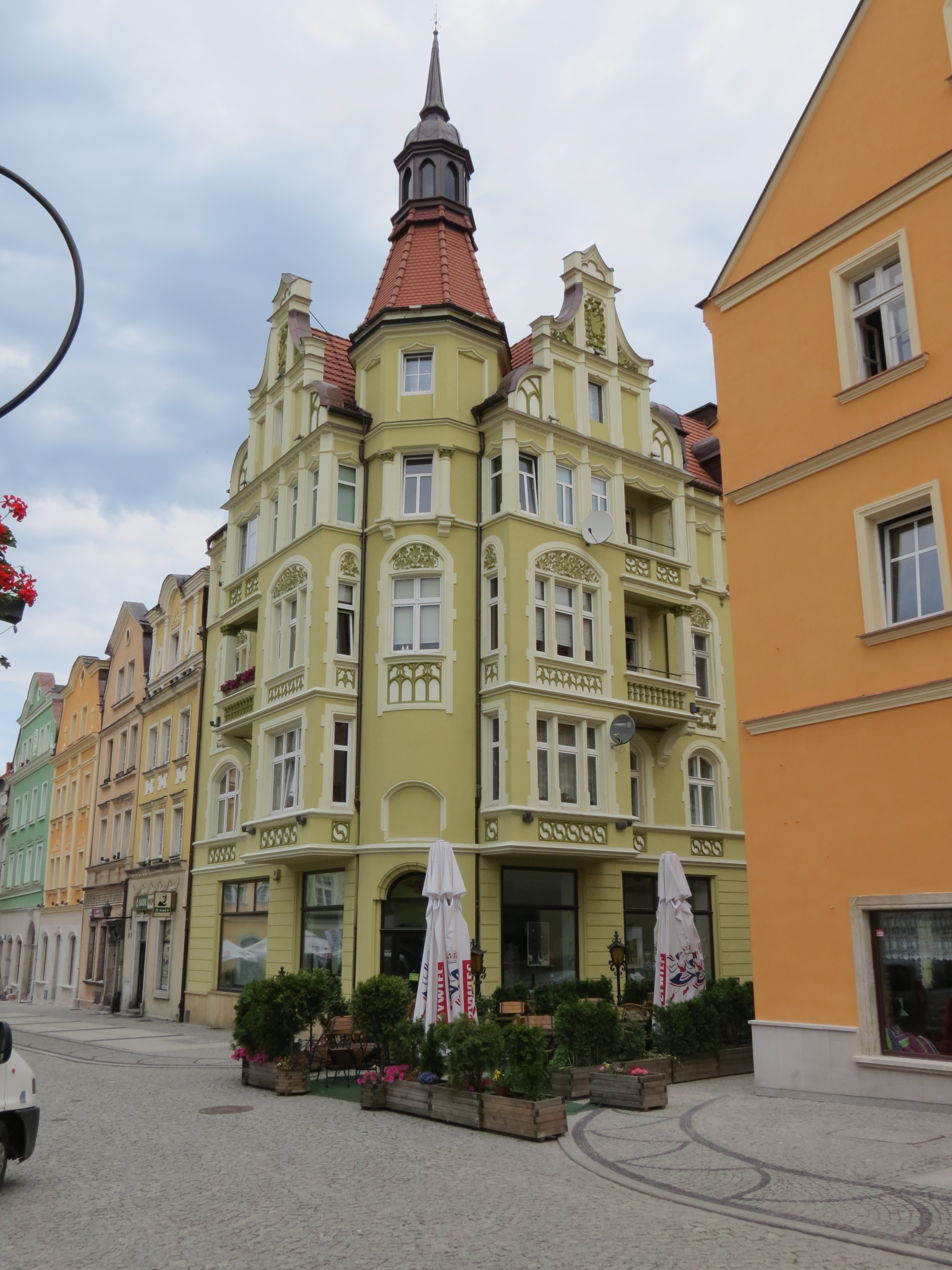
Historic tenements in the Old Town

There is archaeological evidence for pottery being turned in the region as early as the 7th century. Documentary evidence demonstrates potting activity in Bolesławiec itself by the 14th century. High-fired earthenware covered in brown and yellow lead glazes was being produced in Bolesławiec from the late 15th century. By 1473, five separate potteries were at work in the city, and in 1511 they came together to form a guild in order to enforce their monopoly of pottery making.

Early Bunzlauer pottery is exceedingly rare today. The majority of a potshop's production would have been intended for farm and kitchen use: kraut containers, cheese sieves, pickling and preserve jars, baking forms, food molds, storage vessels, and so forth. Most of these stock-in-trade storage or cooking items have either disappeared or go unrecognized and undated today.

What has survived is the "fancy ware" intended for display on the table or in the parlor and used with care. In addition to their utilitarian items, the Bunzlauer potteries of Silesia turned out elegant tankards, pitchers and containers, all bathed in the brown slip "glaze" that characterized this early phase of the Bunzlauer style. The tankards and pitchers often received pewter mountings. The first examples of a distinctive Bunzlauer style are ball-shaped jugs and screw-lidded jars, often decorated with applied cartouches filled with intricate floral design. At first the entire pot, including the decorations, was covered in the same brown slip. Later examples used a yellowish lead glaze for the applied decorations which then stood out against the darker surface of the vessel (Adler, 95). A notable example of Bunzlauer pottery from this period is the hexagonal travel bottle with applied pewter mounts, originally belonging to Pastor Merge and dating to 1640–45.

A type of round-bodied jug with spiraling ribs called a "melon jug" attained popularity in the last quarter of the 17th century and continued to be produced on into the next century. Some examples gave up the application of slip in favor of colored lead glazes. After leaving the potshop, many of these melon jugs received pewter lids made by a tinsmith before being shipped off by wagon or on the back of peddlers to customers in Prussia, Bohemia, and Poland, even as far away as Russia.

=== Industrialisation ===
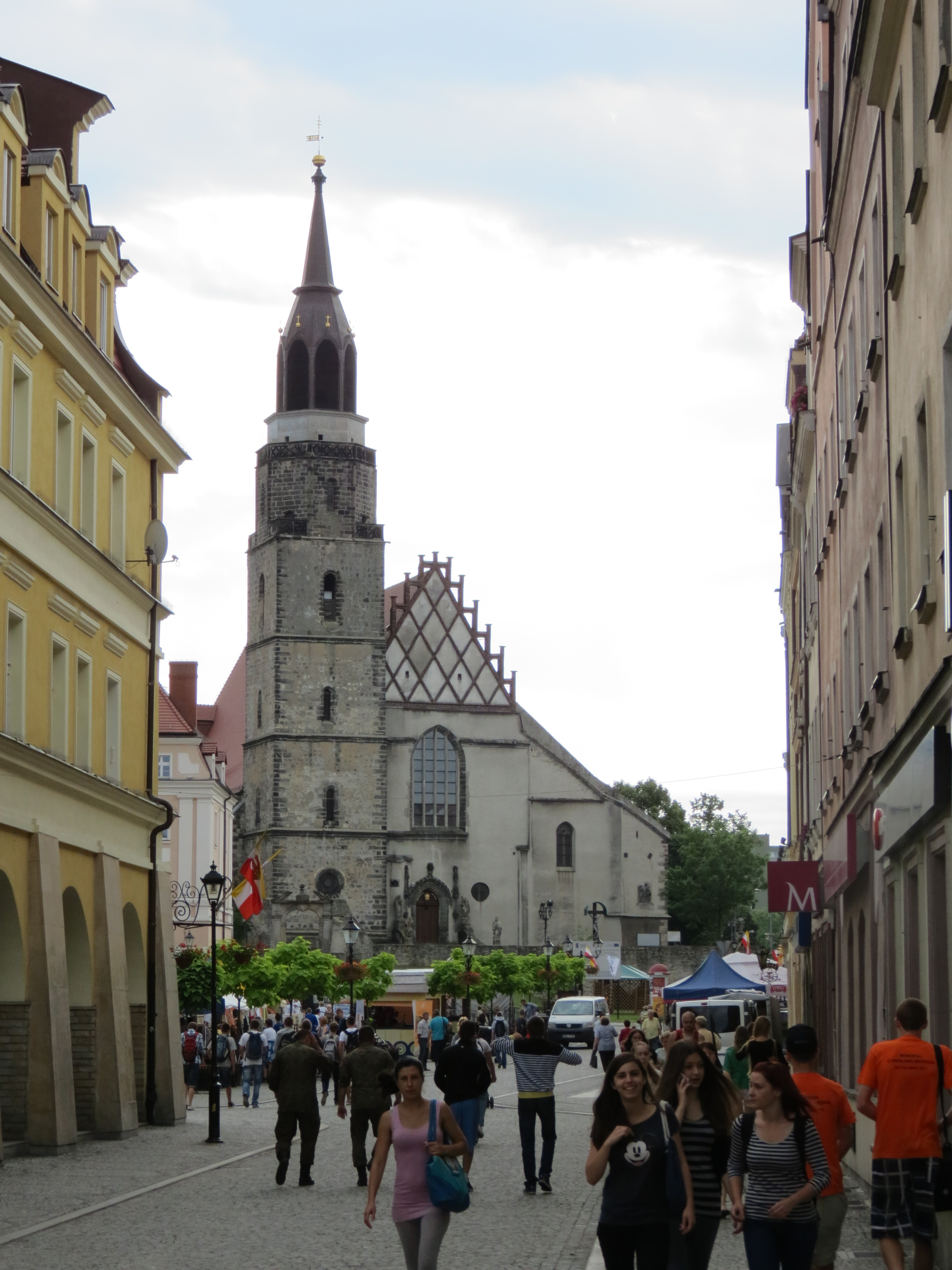
Basilica of the Assumption of Mary

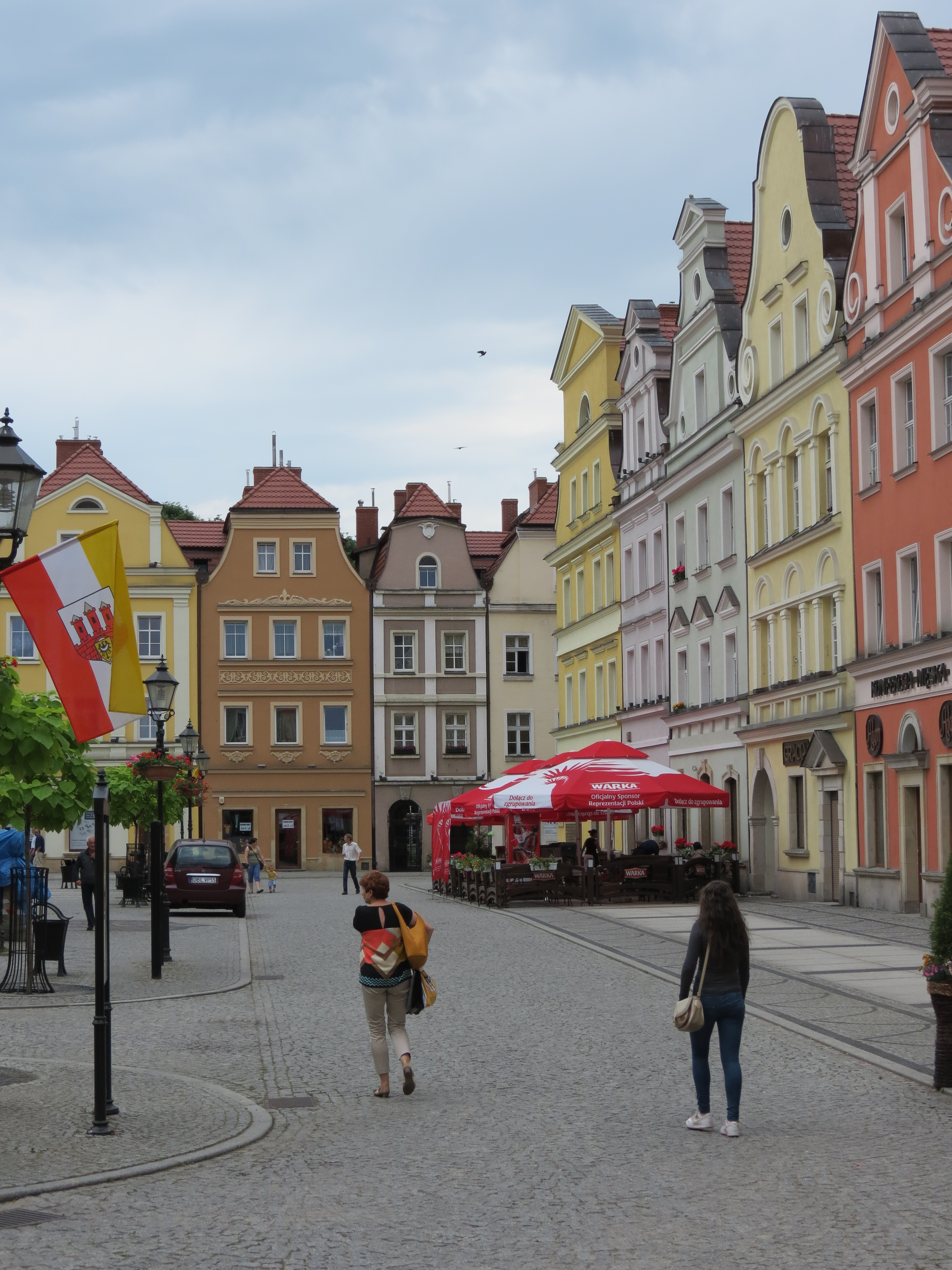
Market Square

The simple blue-on-white spongeware and swirlware productions of the 1880s and 1890s with their clear feldspathic glazes were successful initially, but something still more colorful and forceful was needed if modern customers were to be attracted. This demand was met when, at the turn of the century, Bunzlauer pottery underwent a colorful transformation and a new chapter in its history was opened.

During the first decades of the 20th century, pot shops throughout Silesia and neighboring Lusatia began to decorate their wares with imaginative organic motifs derived from the contemporary Jugendstil aesthetic and applied by brush or, more often, with the aid of cut sponges. Floral designs were common embellishments, but the most popular was the Pfauenauge (peacock's eye) design inspired by the Jugendstil decorators' fascination with the peacock's rich plumage. The Pfauenauge motif became the unofficial, but universally recognized, signature trademark for this category of German spongeware.

By the beginning of the second decade of the new century, many of the potteries throughout the region had evolved into sophisticated ceramic studios, generally continuing to turn out the old utilitarian brown-slip production but giving ever-increasing attention to their new line of colorful ware. Although new designs, many based upon the orientalizing forms popular at the time, were introduced, traditional shapes for coffee pots, bowls, and pitchers were retained but with their surfaces now brightened with a wide variety of Jugendstil patterns, particularly, that of the Pfauenauge.

Even in the studio wares, the blend of folk art and high art is curious and charming, with many of the new and decorative elements taking on a decidedly "country" appearance. This is true for the production of the art potter, Friedrich Festersen (1880–1915), born in northern Schleswig, who opened his Kunsttöpferei Friedrich Festersen in Berlin in 1909 at about the same time that the peacock's eye motif was beginning to embellish the ceramics of Bunzlau. Festersen's connection with the Bunzlauer potteries is uncertain but the peacock's eye motif is to be found throughout the production of his studio. There is no evidence that Festersen turned himself and the potters he employed may have come from Bunzlau, bringing the fashionable new designs with them. Although Festersen was a casualty of the First World War, his art pottery survived until 1922 under the leadership of his widow Sonja.

Increasingly, individual potters and workshops began to mark their wares. Among the prominent names were those of Robert Burdack (who introduced a unique technique of ceramic intarsia inlay), Julius Paul, Hugo Reinhold, and Edwin Werner from Bunzlau and from the surrounding towns of Tillendorf (Bolesławice), Ullersdorf (Ołdrzychów), and Naumburg am Queis came Karl Werner, Gerhard Seiler, Hugo Reinwald, Max Lachmann, Bruno Vogt, and Hermann Kuehn.

So popular did the new Bunzlauer style become that several of the firms, using the technical advice offered by the Bunzlau Keramische Fachschule, transformed their pot shops into large-scale, slip-casting ceramic factories. Leading the way in this manufacturing conversion was the pottery company of Julius Paul & Sohn which was founded in 1893 and continued in operation until 1945. This company was rivaled in quality and innovative design by the firms of Hugo Reinhold, and Edwin Werner. While most of the potteries in Bunzlau and in the surrounding communities continued to utilize the forms by now traditional to Bunzlauer ware, these three "high style" firms experimented with Jugendstil aesthetics and such decorative additions as gold gilding.

All of these commercializing developments encouraged a flourishing export trade which brought shipments of Bunzluer pottery not only to all parts of Europe but into the United States as well, where it competed with similar but recognizably distinct wares produced in neighboring Saxony and Lusatia by such potters as Paul Schreier of Bischofswerda. In the United States, Bunzlauer ware was often marketed under the labels of "Blue Mountain Pottery" or "Erphila", the acronym of the Philadelphia retailer Eberling & Reuss.

=== Post-war era ===
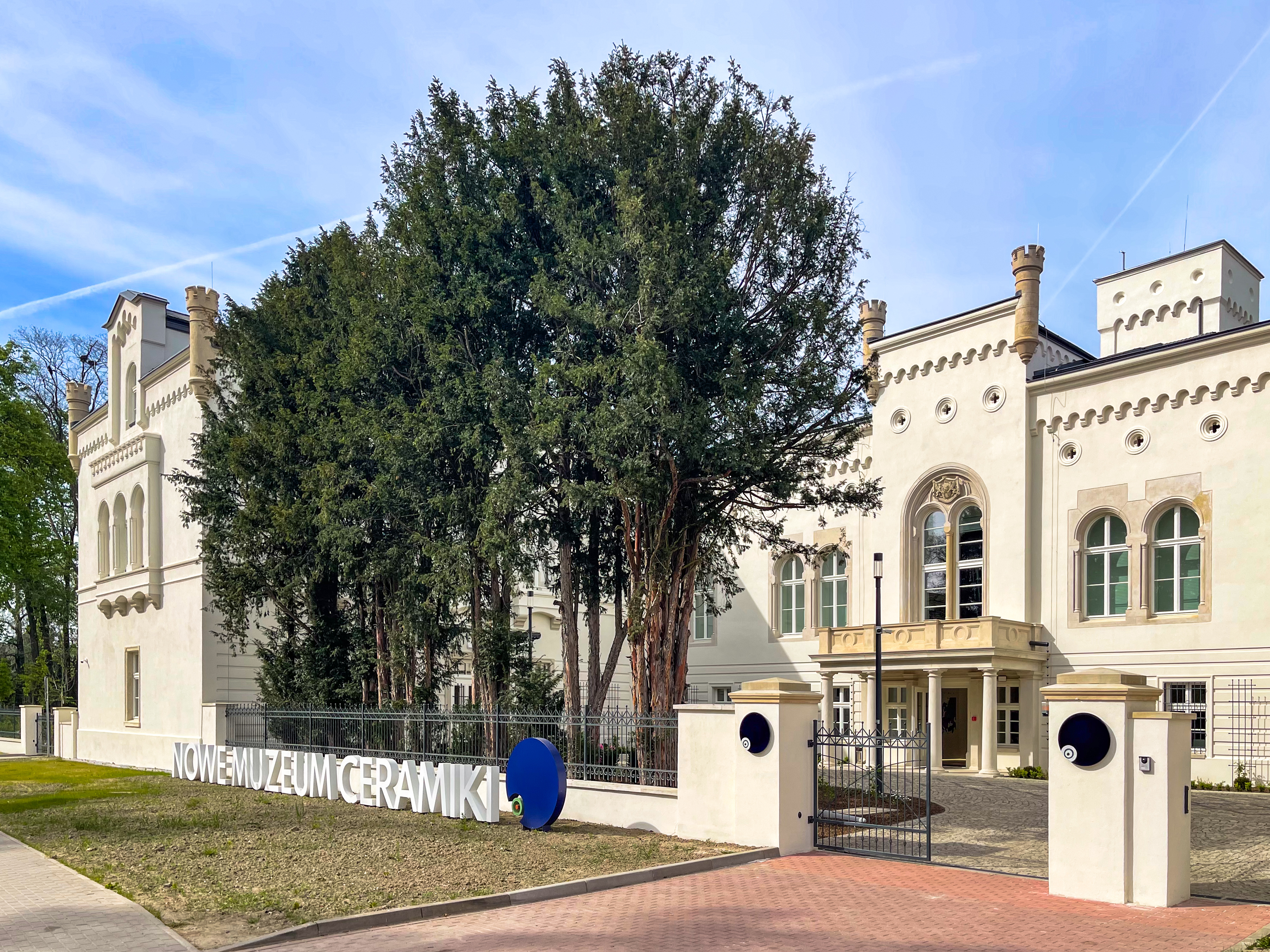
Museum of Ceramics (Muzeum Ceramiki)

The defeat of Germany in World War II and the transfer of the bulk of Lower Silesia to Poland, with the subsequent expulsion of the German population, threatened to end the Bunzlauer ceramic tradition, but it managed to survive in the shops established by displaced potters in the ceramic centers of West Germany, where Bunzlauer style pottery continued to be produced, long celebrated for their native earthenwares or salt-glazed and cobalt-decorated stonewares. Gerhard Seiler from Naumburg am Queis relocated to Leutershausen in Bavaria. Paul Vogt, also from Naumburg settled in Pang near Rosenheim. Max and Wilhelm Werner from Tillendorf initially moved to Höhr-Grenzhausen in the Westerwald range before setting up a shop in nearby Hilgert in 1960. Höhr-Grenzhausen also attracted Georg and Steffi Peltner as well as the firm of Alois Boehm. Georg Greulich opened his pottery in Fredelsloh. The Buchwald brothers relocated to Bayreuth, while Hans Wesenberg founded a studio in Ludwigsburg. Several of these master potters from the Bunzlau district took on fellow Silesian apprentices who went on to open shops of their own in western Germany. Thus, hundreds of miles to the west of Silesia, the Bunzlauer tradition remained alive and well.

The Bunzlauer style also has survived in the continuously functioning pot shops of former East Germany in the potting communities of Neukirch/Lausitz, Bischofswerda, Pulsnitz, and Königsbrück. The Upper Lusatian town of Königsbrück is home to the Frommhold Pottery, founded in 1851, the last survivor of 21 potteries once active in the community. The town of Neukirch has contained three active potteries to continue the tradition, that of the Kannegiesser family begun in 1824, that of Karl Louis Lehmann established in 1834, and the Heinke Pottery producing ware since 1866. Pulsnitz is the home of the Juergel Pottery, thought to have been responsible for first introducing the sponging technique and the peacock-eye motif into Lusatia.

Meanwhile, back in Bolesławiec, a new and Polish chapter in the pottery's history was opening, after the city had been severely damaged in the war and its German population expelled. The Polish population that moved in found the surviving ceramic manufacturies stripped of machinery and equipment. Nevertheless, despite the lack of technical expertise in ceramic production in post-war Poland, one of the old factories was back in operation as early as 1946. But it was not until two years later that the first simple pots were being turned out.

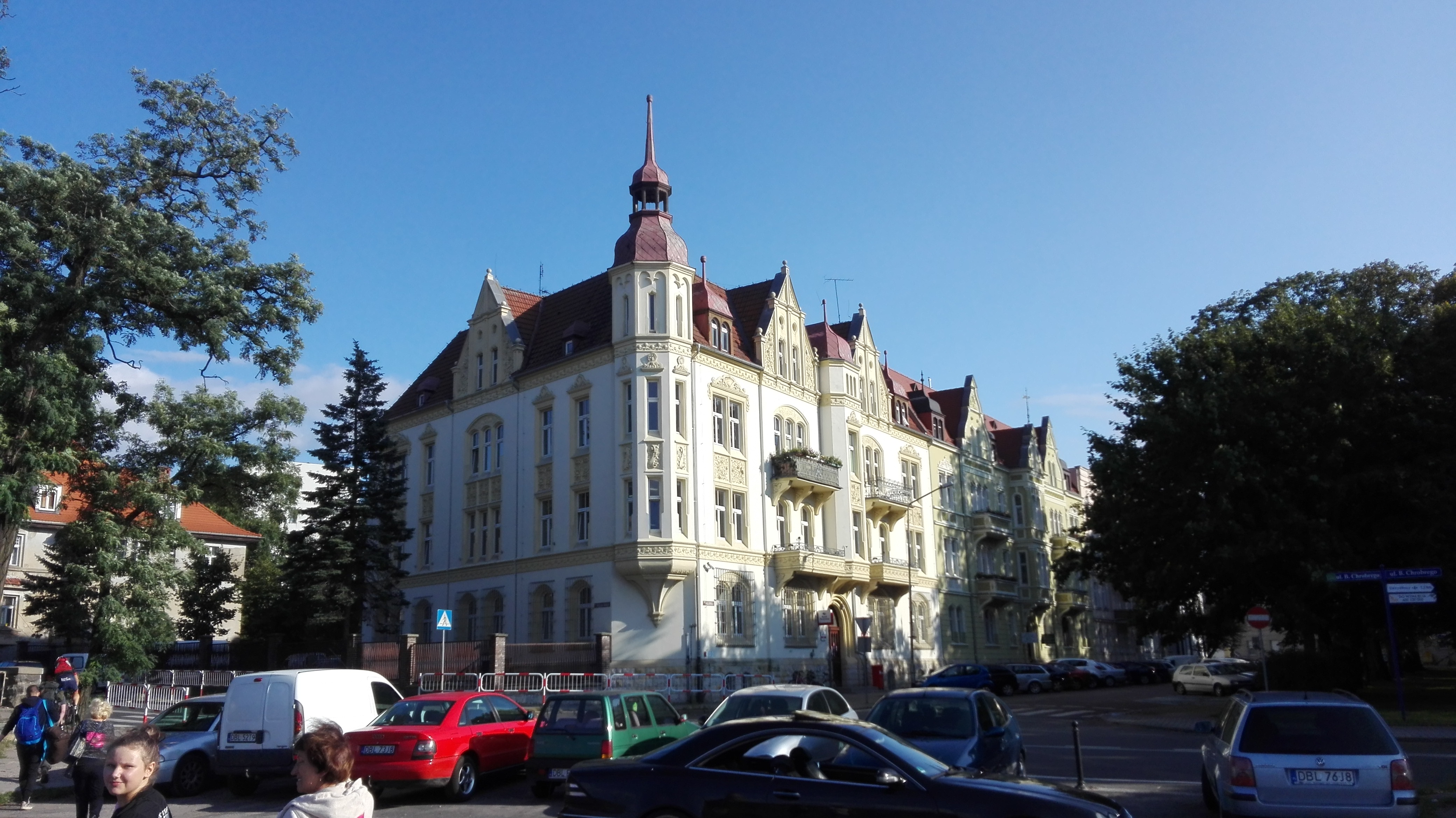
Historic building of the post office in Bolesławiec

The largest producer of Bolesławiec Polish pottery is Bolesławiec Artistic Ceramic. Most of its production is destined for export. It can be recognized by its trademark stamp based upon the three-tower Bolesławiec coat-of-arms below the letter "B". This mark was used until 1996, when it was replaced by the letter "B" enclosed within the outline of a typical Bunzlauer coffee pot set above the castle. Bolesławiec pottery shipped to the United States will have "Hand Made in Poland" stamped on the base of each piece of crockery.

With the collapse of Communism, the two large state-owned ceramic manufacturies on the outskirts of Bolesławiec were privatized and several smaller private potteries were opened. In these smaller workshops, the potters turn each piece on the wheel but the larger manufacturies mold-cast their ceramics which are then hand finished, fired, hand decorated using either brush or sponge stamp, glazed and refired. The shapes and patterns found in the ceramic showrooms of Bolesławiec today and which are offered for sale, worldwide, at a number of outlet stores and internet sites, are staggering in variety: coffee pots, tea pots, cups, mugs, pitchers, platters, breakfast and dinner services, sets of bowls, candle holders, butter dishes cast in the shape of full-skirted peasant women, Christmas tree ornaments, all painted or sponge decorated in cheerful and colorful, folkloric patterns.

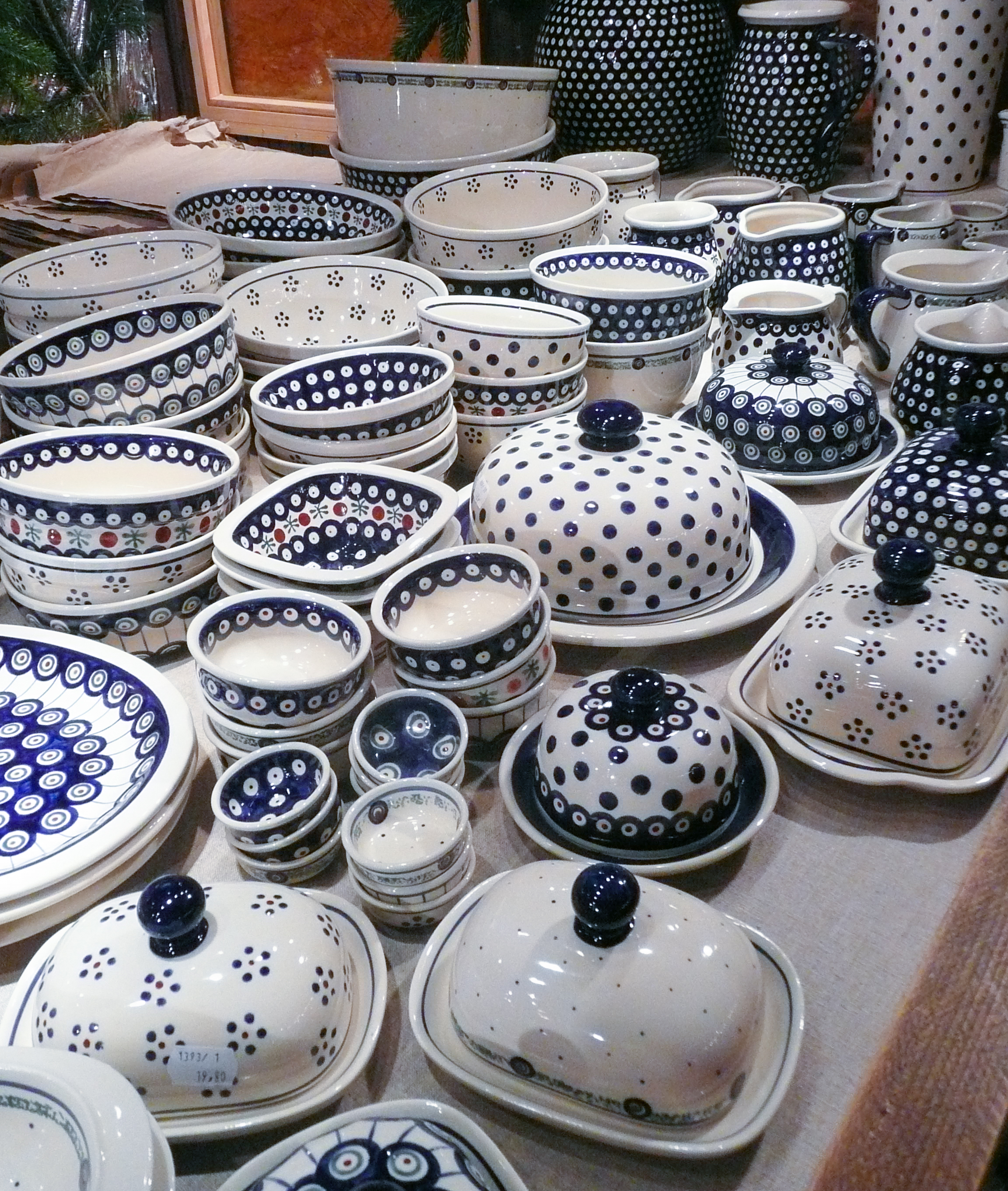
Various ceramics from Bolesławiec

The Bolesławiec pottery that is most recognizable today is the white or cream colored ceramic with dark blue, green, brown, and sometimes red or purple motifs. Some of the designs used in this modern Polish pottery rendition of the older Bunzlauer ware harkens back to the German decorative motifs of the pre-war period but the new ceramic artisans of Bolesławiec have not hesitated to invent their own decorations, many of which are designed to have an especial appeal to the pottery's growing international clientele. The most common designs in today's production include sponge-stamped dots, abstract florals, speckles, windmills, and, of course, the famous "peacock's eye".

A growing appreciation for this ceramic category has been stimulated by a number of public exhibitions. The initial one, in which more than900 pieces were on display, was entitled "Bunzlauer Geschirr: Gebrauchsware zwischen Handwerk und Industrie" was held at three venues in Germany in 1986–88: the Museum fuer Deutsche Volkskunde in Berlin, the Hetjens-Museum in Düsseldorf and the Altonaer Museum in Hamburg. The catalogue to this exhibition has become the standard reference work for those interested in Bunzlauer pottery. Additional presentations of Bunzlauer pottery in Germany have included "Guter Ton aus Bunzlau" on view in 2004–05 at the Germanisches Nationalmuseum in Nuremberg featuring examples from that institution's extensive collection; "Bunzlauer Keramik: Schlesisches Kunsthandwerk" at the Keramik-Museum Berlin in 2008; "Bunzlauer Tippel nach 1945" at the Bunzlauer Heimatstube in Siegburg in 2009; and "Bunzlauer Keramik – Gestern und Heute" at the Haus des Deutschen Ostens in Munich in 2011 -12. Polish museums also have contributed to the increasing public awareness of Bunzlauer pottery. In 1995, the Ceramics Museum in Boleslaweic collaborated with the Muzeum Narodowe, Wrocław (National Museum, Wrocław) in presenting "Artystyczna Kamionka Bolesławiecka", utilizing the holdings of both museums. In 2008, Bolesławiec's Ceramic Museum organized a show centered around one of the most prominent of the town's pre-war potteries, that of Hugo Reinhold. "Vom Kunsthandwerk zur Kunst – Bunzlauer Keramik aus dem Haus Reinhold" was also exhibited in Germany at the Schlesisches Museum in Görlitz. Another of Bunzlau's accomplished ceramic producers was celebrated in Austria when "Art Deco Keramik Bunzlau: die Feinsteinzeugfabrik Julius Paul & Sohn 1893–1945" was presented at the Oesterreiches Postsparkasse in Vienna. In addition to these European exhibitions, there have been three showings of Bunzlauer ceramics in the United States. The first took place at the McKissick Museum of the University of South Carolina in Columbia, South Carolina in 1998 as part of an exhibit called "Two Traditions in Transition: Folk Potters of Eastern Germany and the American South". This was followed by "Bunzlauer Style: German Pottery from Jugendstil to Art Deco", presented in 2002 by the Georgia Museum of Art in Athens, Georgia. Bunzlauer Pottery also was featured in an exhibit at the Columbia Museum of Art in Columbia, South Carolina in 2005–06.

Older, pre-war examples of Bunzlauer pottery are avidly sought by collectors today. Private collections abound, especially in Germany but also abroad, including the United States where some individuals have amassed collections of more than 100 pieces of the pre-1945 pottery, most of which had been imported during the period between the two world wars. Extensive public collections of Bunzlauer ceramics are to be found in Poland at the Muzeum Ceramiki in Bolesławiec (with over 2000 pieces) and the National Museum in Wrocław; in Germany at the Schlesisches Museum in Görlitz, the permanent exhibition Keramik des Bunzlauer Töpfergebietes at Antik Leonhardt, Görlitz, at the Germanisches Nationalmuseum in Nuremberg, at the Keramik-Museum and at the Museum Europäischer Kulturen in Berlin, at the Haus der Begegnung of the Bundesheimatgruppe Bunzlau in Siegburg, at the Heimatmuseums in Neukirch/Lausitz and Pulsnitz, at the Museum für Sächsische Volkskunst in Dresden, and at the Sorbian Museum in Bautzen; and in the United States at the Columbia Museum of Art in Columbia, South Carolina which houses a collection of 110 pieces.

== Settlements ==
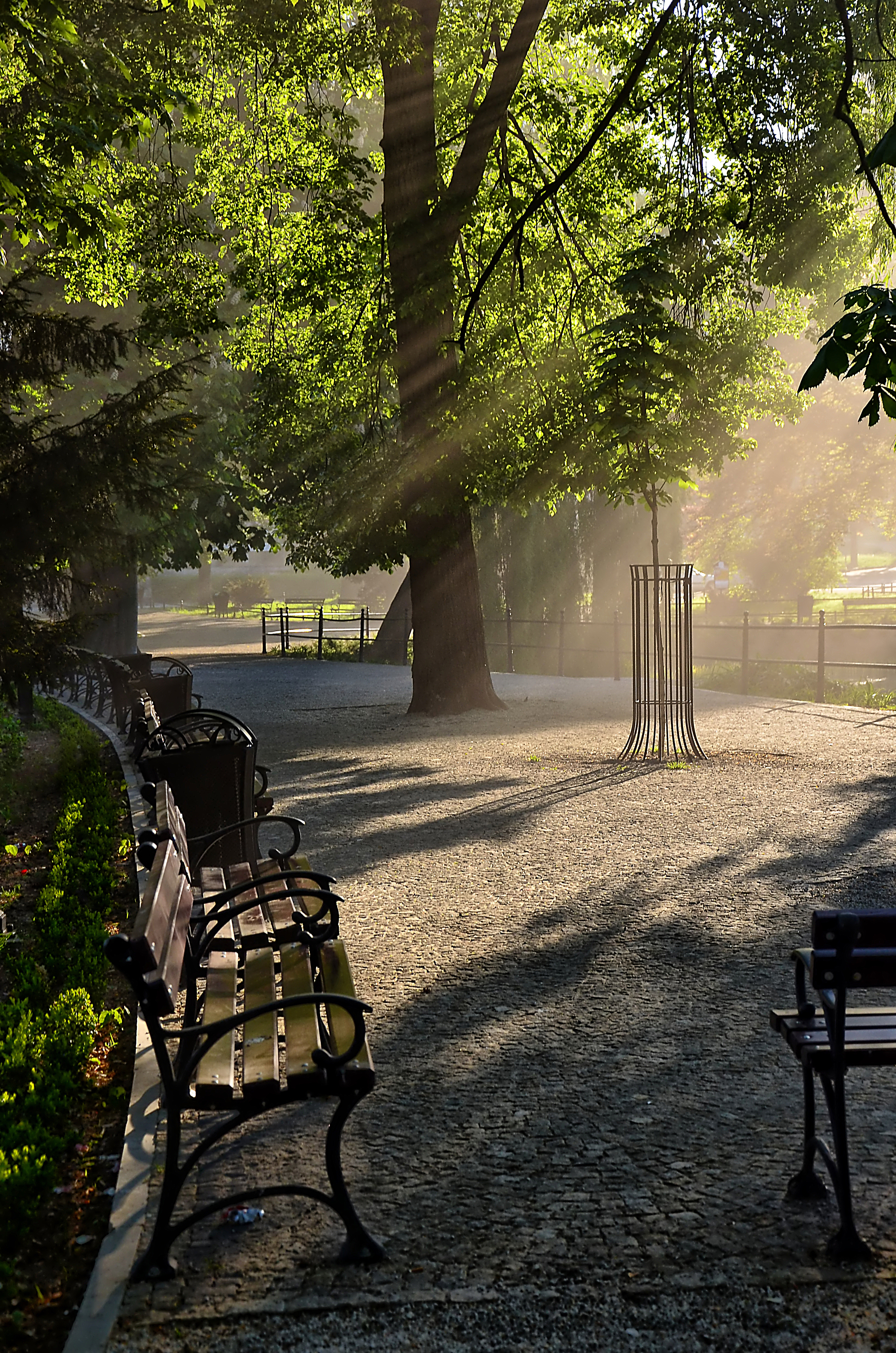
Urban plants created after 1867

Pre-war settlements (as of 1903):

- Dzielnica Miejska (Stadtbezirk)
- Dzielnica Dolna (Niederbezirk)
- Dzielnica Zamkowa (Schlossbezirk)
- Dzielnica Sierociniecka (Waisenhausbezirk)
- Dzielnica Dworcowa (Bahnhofbezirk)
- Dzielnica Górna (Oberbezirk)
- Dzielnica Anielska (Angelbezirk)
- Dzielnica Mikołajska (Nikolaibezirk)
- Brama Godnowska (Gnadenbergerthorbezirk)
- Brama Lwówecka (Löwenbergerthorbezirk)
- Brama Zgorzelecka (Görlitzerthorbezirk)
- Brama Szprotawska (Sprottauerthorbezirk)

Contemporary settlements:

- Południe
- Piastów
- Kwiatowe
- Śródmieście
- Leśne
- Witosa
- Lubańska
- Czterdziestolecia
- Przylesie
- Przylesie II
- Zabobrze
- Staszica
- Kościuszki
- Nadzieja
- Jana Pawła II

== Transport ==
=== Road ===
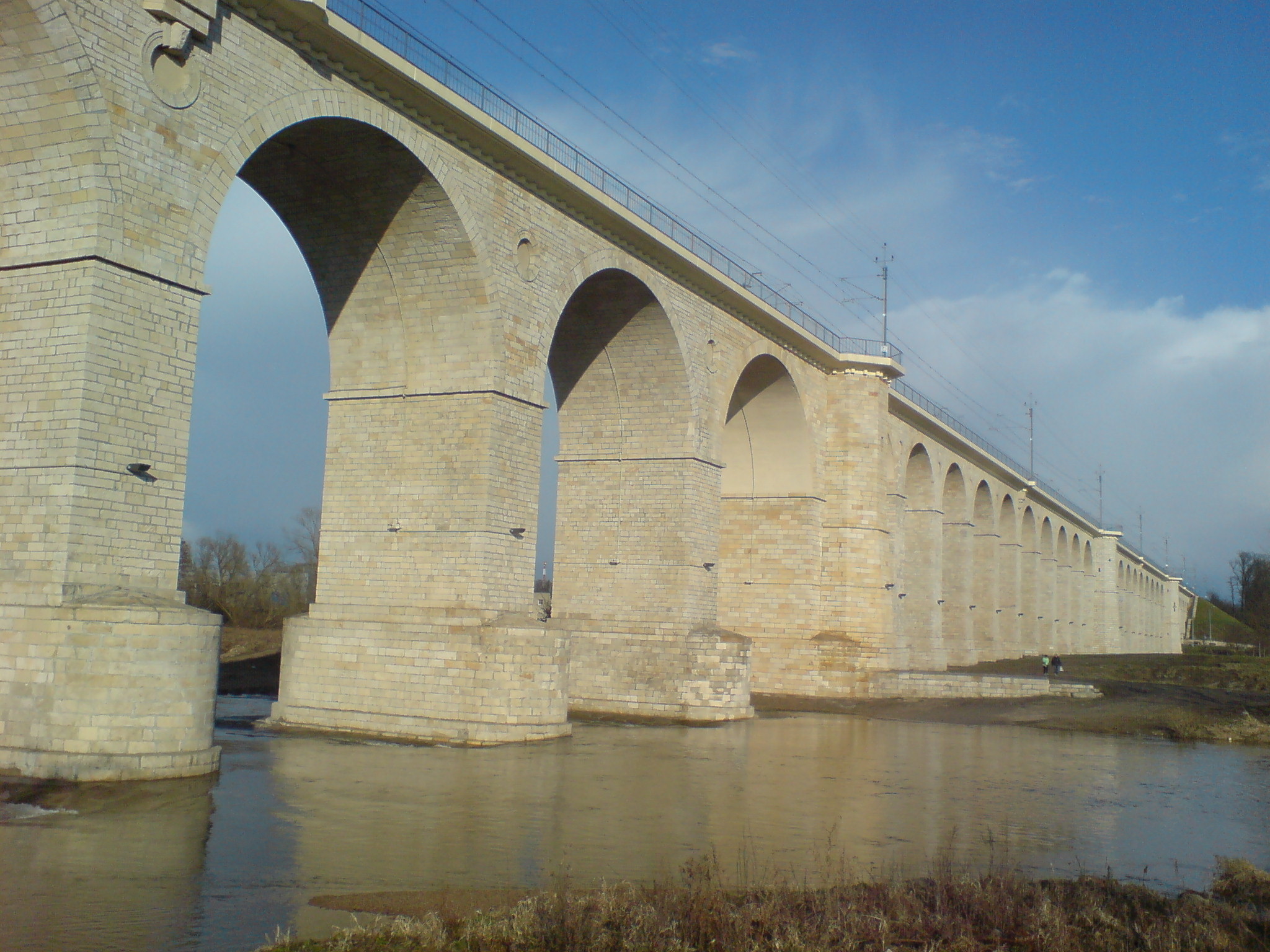
The railway viaduct in Bolesławiec renovated and strengthened in connection with the renovation of the railway line

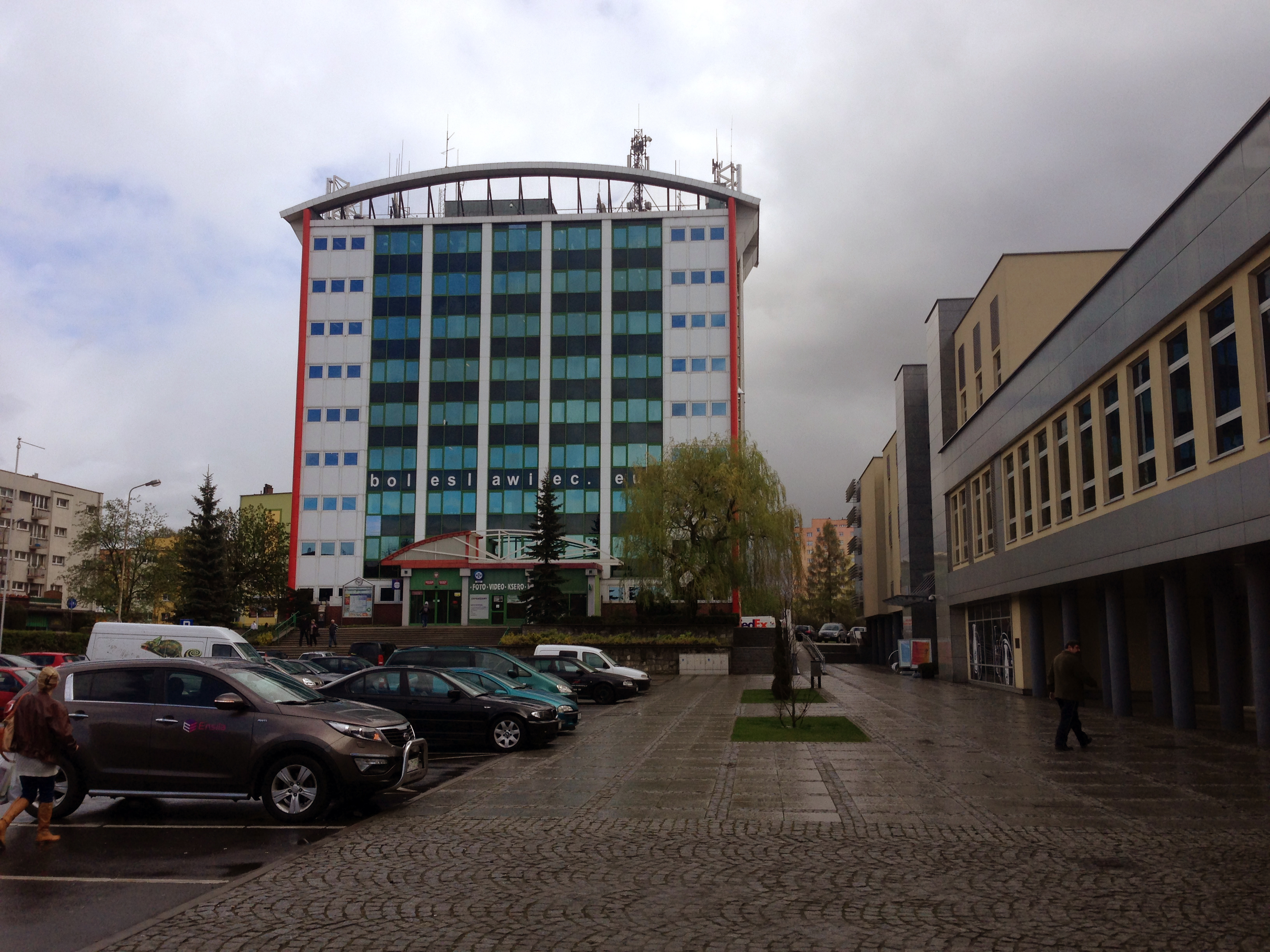
View of the pl. marsz. Józef Piłsudski

Bolesławiec is located at the intersection of the East-West and North-South routes. The following road routes run through the city:

Road	Route
DK 94	DK 30 Zgorzelec – Bolesławiec – Legnica – Wrocław – Opole – Bytom – Będzin – Sosnowiec – Kraków – Tarnów – Rzeszów – Przeworsk – Korczowa
DW 297	S 3 E65 Nowa Sól – Kożuchów – Szprotawa – Bolesławiec – Lwówek Śląski – Pasiecznik DK 30
DW 350	Łęknica – Przewóz – Gozdnica – Ruszów – Osiecznica – Bolesławiec DK 94
DW 363	DW 297 Bolesławiec – Złotoryja – Jawor – Drogomiłowice DW 345

The A4 motorway passes to the north of Bolesławiec. The town can be accessed via DW 297 from exit 3 of the A4.

There are also local routes from Bolesławiec to Lubań, Krzyżowa, Stare Jaroszewice and Ocice.

=== Rail ===
Bolesławiec railway station on the Miłkowice–Jasień railway serves the town, and sees both regional and intercity services.

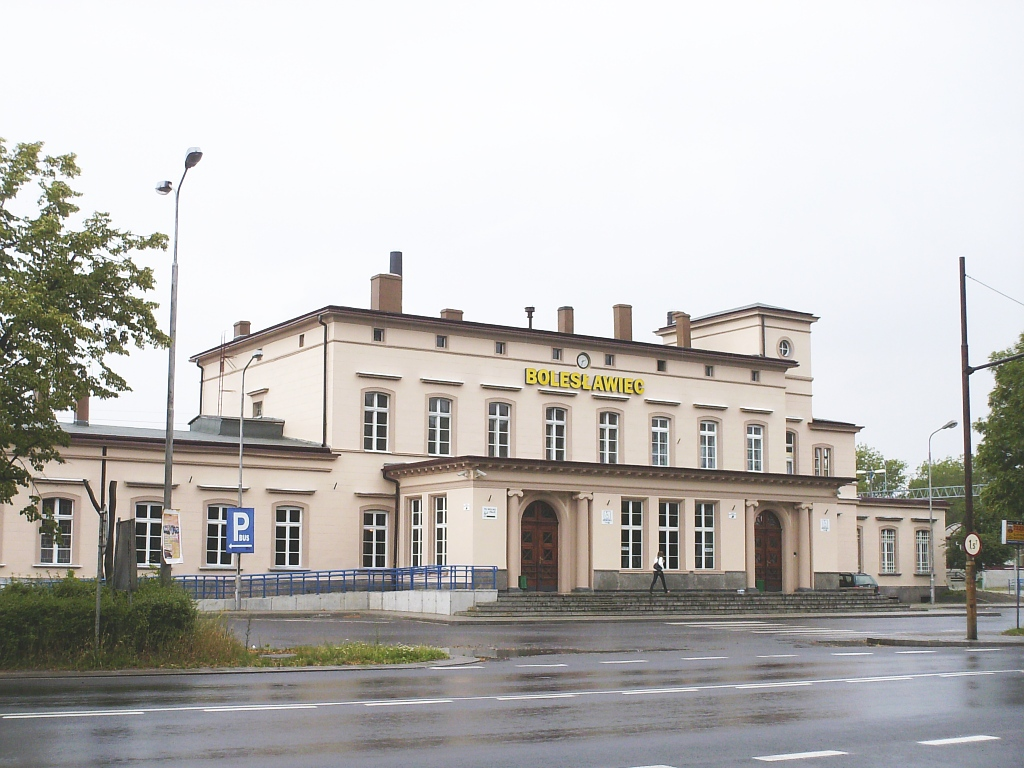
Bolesławiec railway station

=== Collective transport ===
There is a bus depot in the city.

==== Carriers ====
- PKS w Bolesławcu Sp. z o.o.
- Auto-Linie
- Grażyna

=== Public transport ===
The Bolesławiec area is served by the Municipal Transport Company in Bolesławiec. In June 2018, free public transport was introduced in the city.

=== Air Transport ===
About 17 km northeast of the city, there is the Krzywa airstrip, on the site of a former airport. Kryzwa airstrip is not active anymore, however the nearest airfield available by road distance from Bolesławiec would be in Jelenia Góra.

== Media ==
- Press:
  - Gazeta Bolec.Info – free biweekly
  - Gazeta Konieczne.pl – a free biweekly published since 2009 (previously called Essential Information)
  - Express Bolesławiecki (published by the Expressy Dolnośląskie group)
- TV:
  - Bolesławiec Television
- Internet:
  - bobrzanie.pl
  - Konieczny.pl (previously: boleslawiec.org, Koniecznyinformacje.pl)
  - bolec.info
  - wboleslawcu.pl

== Culture ==
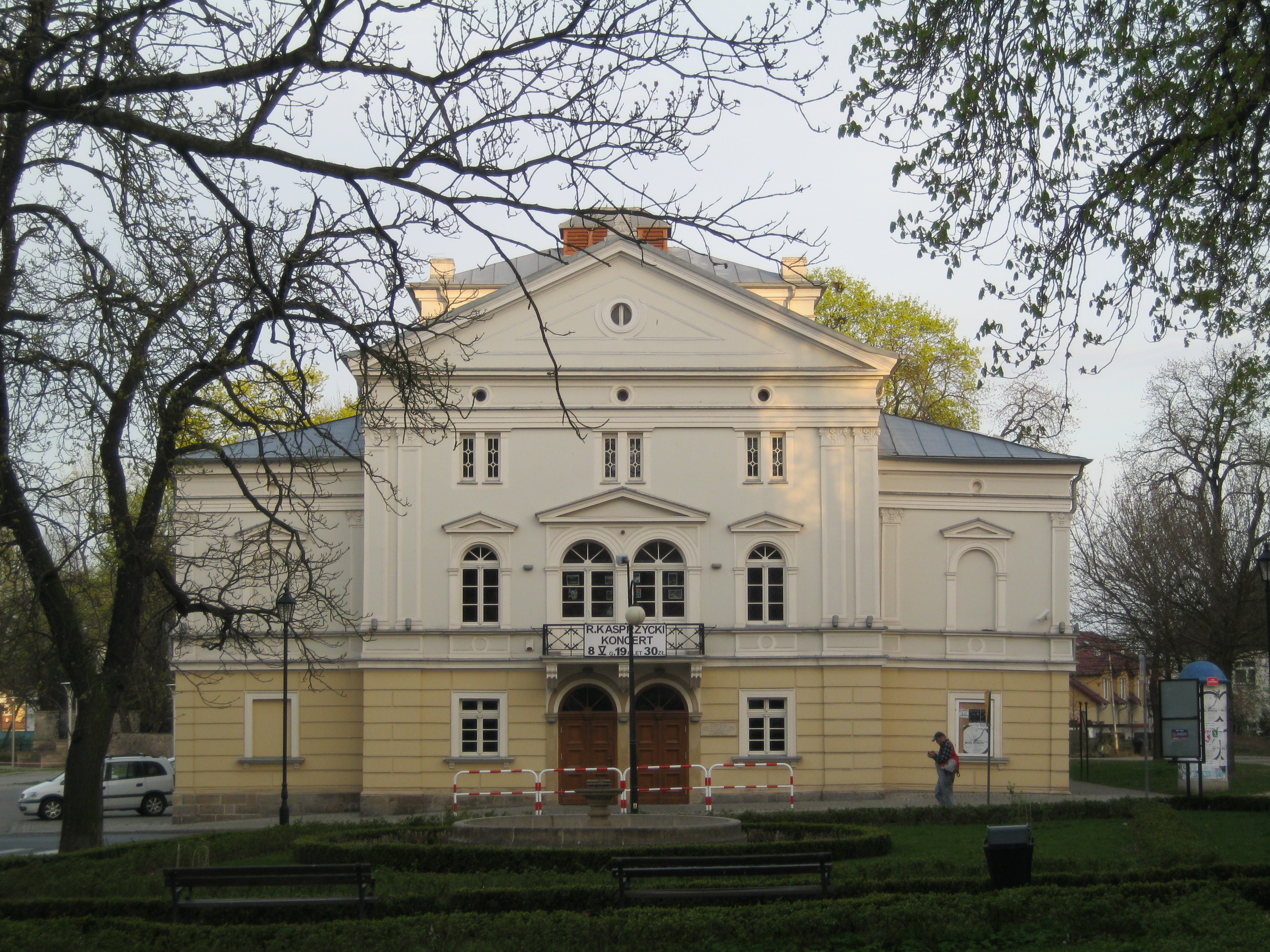
Teatr Stary ("Old Theater") in Bolesławiec

- Until 1944, the Silesian National Theater (Schlesisches Landestheater von Bunzlau) operated in the Old Theater, with a permanent theater group. After the war, the theater was the stage of the Youth Cultural Center in Bolesławiec. The building was closed in 2007 due to its technical condition. After obtaining EU funding, a thorough renovation was carried out. On March 23, 2012, it was reopened and is used by MDK and the Bolesławiec district.
- In 2014, the 50th International Ceramic and Sculpture Open-Air took place.
- Since 1994, the Ceramics Festival has been held in Bolesławiec on the penultimate weekend of August. It is a three-day (since 2012 five-day) festival aimed at promoting Bolesławiec pottery. Since 2007, the Clay Parade has been held during the Bolesławiec Ceramics Festival.
- Since 1990, Blues nad Bobrem has been organized - an international blues event combined with blues workshops. In 2007 they appeared, among others: Jam, Blues Night Shift and the President's Home Guard.
- City Days take place every year in June
- Another tradition is the Balkan Culture Day, which takes place at the beginning of summer.

== Religious communities ==
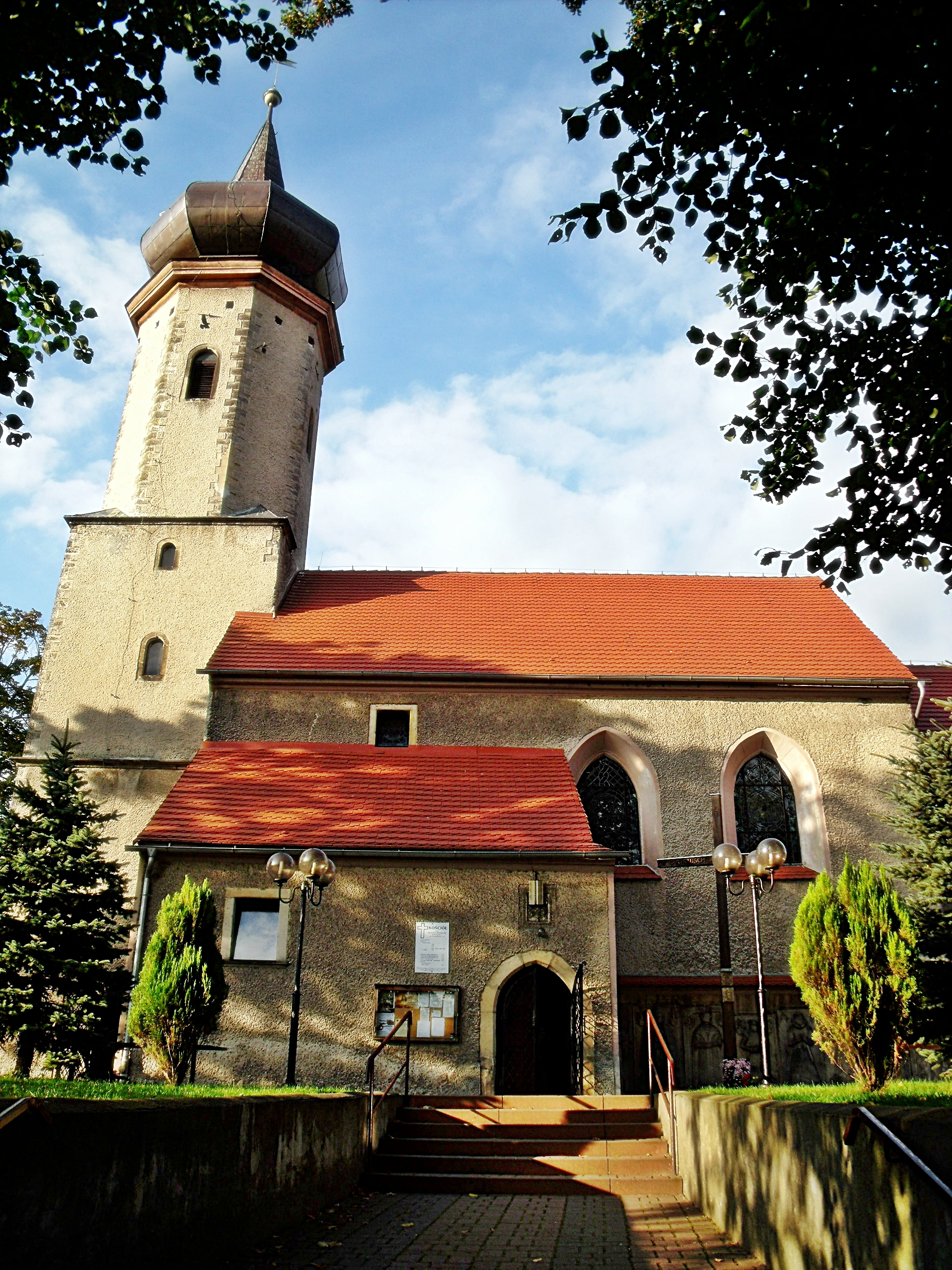
Church of Our Lady of the Rosary

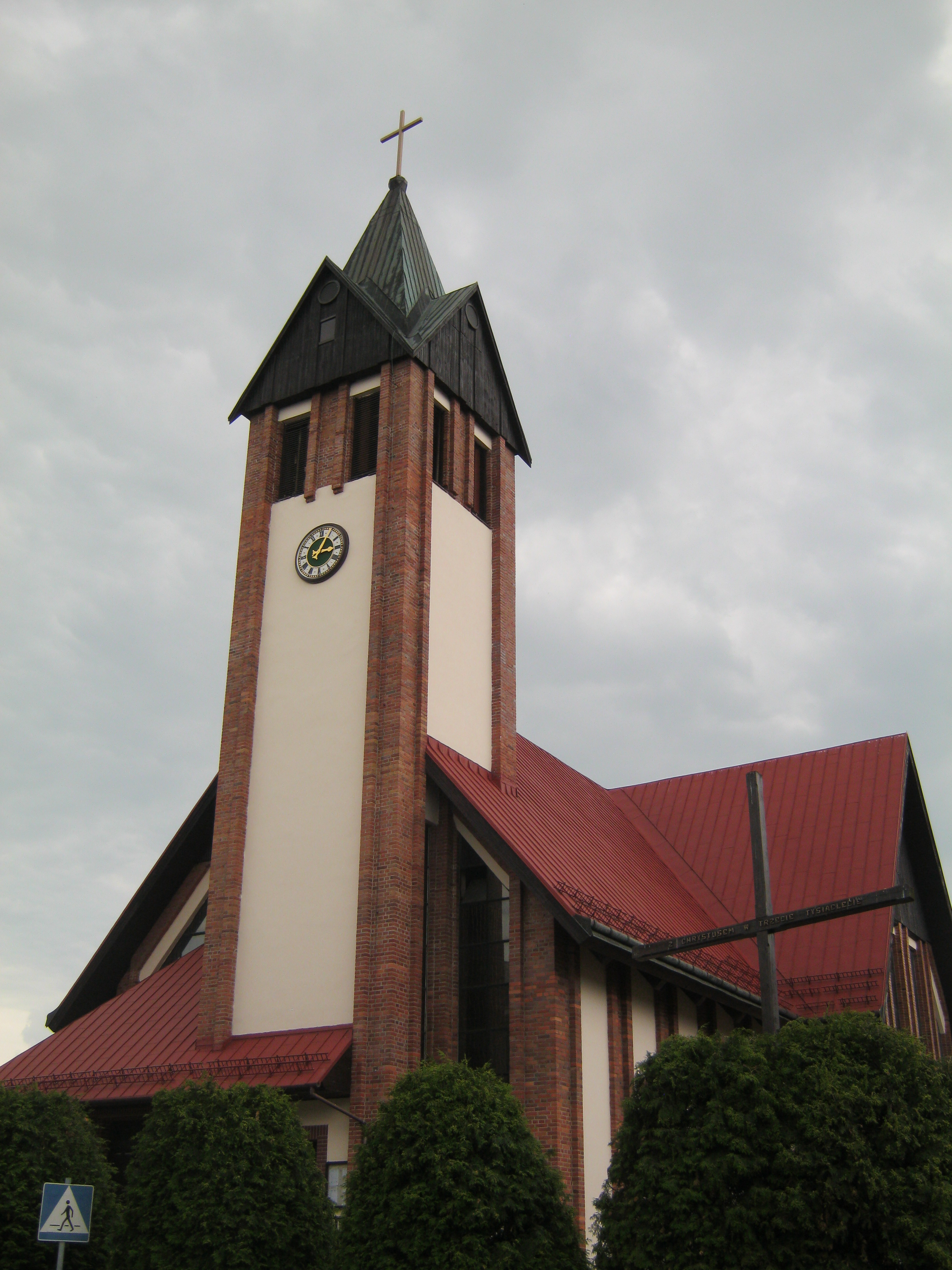
Roman Catholic Church of St. Cyril and Methodius

The following churches and religious associations conduct religious activities in the city:

- Seventh-day Adventist Church in Poland:
  - church in Bolesławiec
- Evangelical Augsburg Church in Poland:
  - branch in Bolesławiec of the Evangelical-Augsburg Parish in Lubań
- Greek Catholic Church:
  - pastoral facility in Bolesławiec, services take place in the Roman Catholic Church of Our Lady of Perpetual Help
- Roman Catholic Church:
  - parish of Saints Cyril and Methodius, ul. Short 1
  - parish of the Assumption of the Blessed Virgin Mary and Saint Mikołaja, ul. Kościelna 3
  - parish of Our Lady of Perpetual Help, pl. Zamkowy 1b
  - parish of Our Lady of the Rosary, ul. Ptasia 5
  - parish of the Most Holy Body and Blood of Christ, ul. Eliza Orzeszkowa 3
  - parish of the Sacred Heart of Jesus, ul. Jarzębinowa 49
  - Priestly Brotherhood of Saint Pius X, chapel of the Blessed Virgin Mary of Perpetual Help, ul. Garncarska 17
- Pentecostal church:
  - "Good News" church
- Jehovah's Witnesses:
  - Bolesławiec-Południe church
  - Bolesławiec-Północ church
  - Bolesławiec-Russian church
  - Bolesławiec-Zachód congregation
  - Kingdom Hall, ul. Sadowa 36 lok. 1.

== Twin towns – sister cities ==
Bolesławiec is twinned with:

- Acuto, Italy
- Česká Lípa, Czech Republic
- Mariagerfjord, Denmark
- Molde, Norway
- Nogent-sur-Marne, France
- Pirna, Germany
- Prnjavor, Bosnia and Herzegovina
- Siegburg, Germany
- Vallecorsa, Italy
- Zbarazh, Ukraine

== People associated with Bolesławiec ==
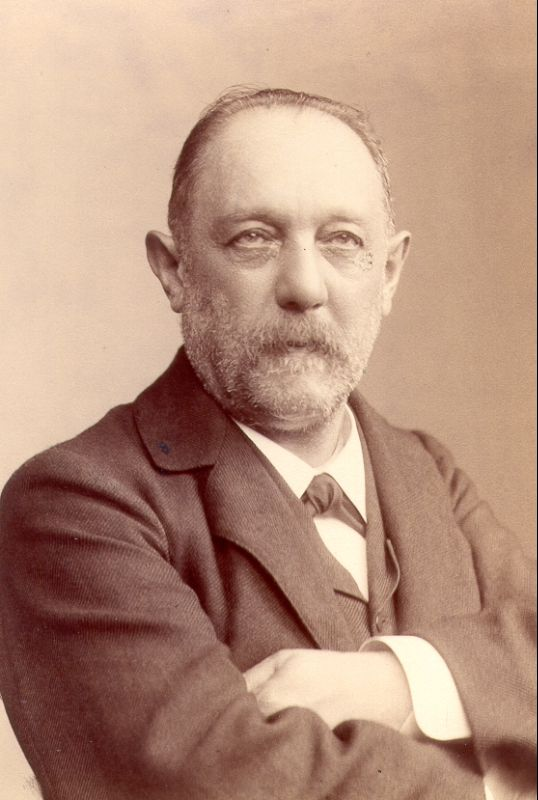
Emanuel Mendel

- Martin Opitz (1597–1639), German Baroque poet
- Jonathan Eybeschutz (1690–1764). rabbi, Talmudist, Halachist, and Kabbalist
- Carl Ferdinand Appun (1820–1872), German naturalist
- Emanuel Mendel (1839–1907), German neurologist and psychiatrist, university professor, and director of a polyclinic
- Reinhold Röhricht (1842–1905), German historian
- Frank Russek (1875/1876-1948), Polish-born American businessman, co-founder of the Russeks department store chain
- Fritz Schulz (1879–1957), German lawyer, jurist, writer, and legal historian
- Dieter Hildebrandt (1927–2013), German cabaret artist
- Łukasz Kubot (born 1982), Polish tennis player
- Monika Sozanska (born 1983), Polish-German fencer

=== Honorary Citizens ===
Until July 2016, 12 people were awarded the title of Honorary Citizen.

- Edward Bober (born 1930, died 2021): Catholic priest, Domestic Prelate of His Holiness. In 1969, he was sent on a mission to rebuild the former Evangelical church in Bolesławiec and create a new parish. In the years 1969–2006, parish priest. Our Lady of Perpetual Help in Bolesławiec and dean of the Bolesławiec-Zachód deanery. The title was given in 2000.
- Hubert Bonin (born 1912, died 2008): scout, founder of scouting in the Bolesławiec district, prisoner of the Stutthof concentration camp. (2005)
- Adam Wacław Kowalski (born 1907, died 2003): watchmaker, one of the first Polish forced displaced persons from the Eastern Borderlands who came to Bolesławiec in 1945, thanks to his work the clock on the town hall tower was renovated after World War II. (2000)
- Władysław Rączka (died June 8, 2008): Catholic priest, dean, long-time parish priest of the Assumption of the Blessed Virgin Mary and Saint. Nicholas. (1995)
- Ryszard Tomczyk (2001)
- Rolf Krieger (2002)
- Bronisław Wolanin (2011)
- Zbigniew Razik (2011)
- Jan Filipek (2011)
- Janina Bany-Kozłowska (2015)
- Krystyna Gay-Kutschenreiter (2016)
- Józef Gołębiowski (2016)
