= Nowa =

Nowa or NOWA may refer to:

- Independent Publishing House NOWA, Poland
- Nowa, Lower Silesian Voivodeship, village in Poland
- Nowa TV, Polish television channel
- Nowa (TV series), Polish TV series

== See also ==
- Nowa Wieś (disambiguation)
- Nova (disambiguation)
