= Łąka, Lower Silesian Voivodeship =

Łąka
- Village
- Location within Poland
- Coordinates: 51°17′49″N 15°34′13″E
- Country: Poland
- Voivodeship: Lower Silesian
- County: Bolesławiec
- Gmina: Bolesławiec
- Population: 260
- Time zone: UTC+1 (CET)
  - Summer (DST): UTC+2 (CEST)
- Vehicle registration: DBL

Łąka [ˈwɔnka] is a village in the administrative district of Gmina Bolesławiec, within Bolesławiec County, Lower Silesian Voivodeship, in south-western Poland.
