= Kraszowice =

- Village
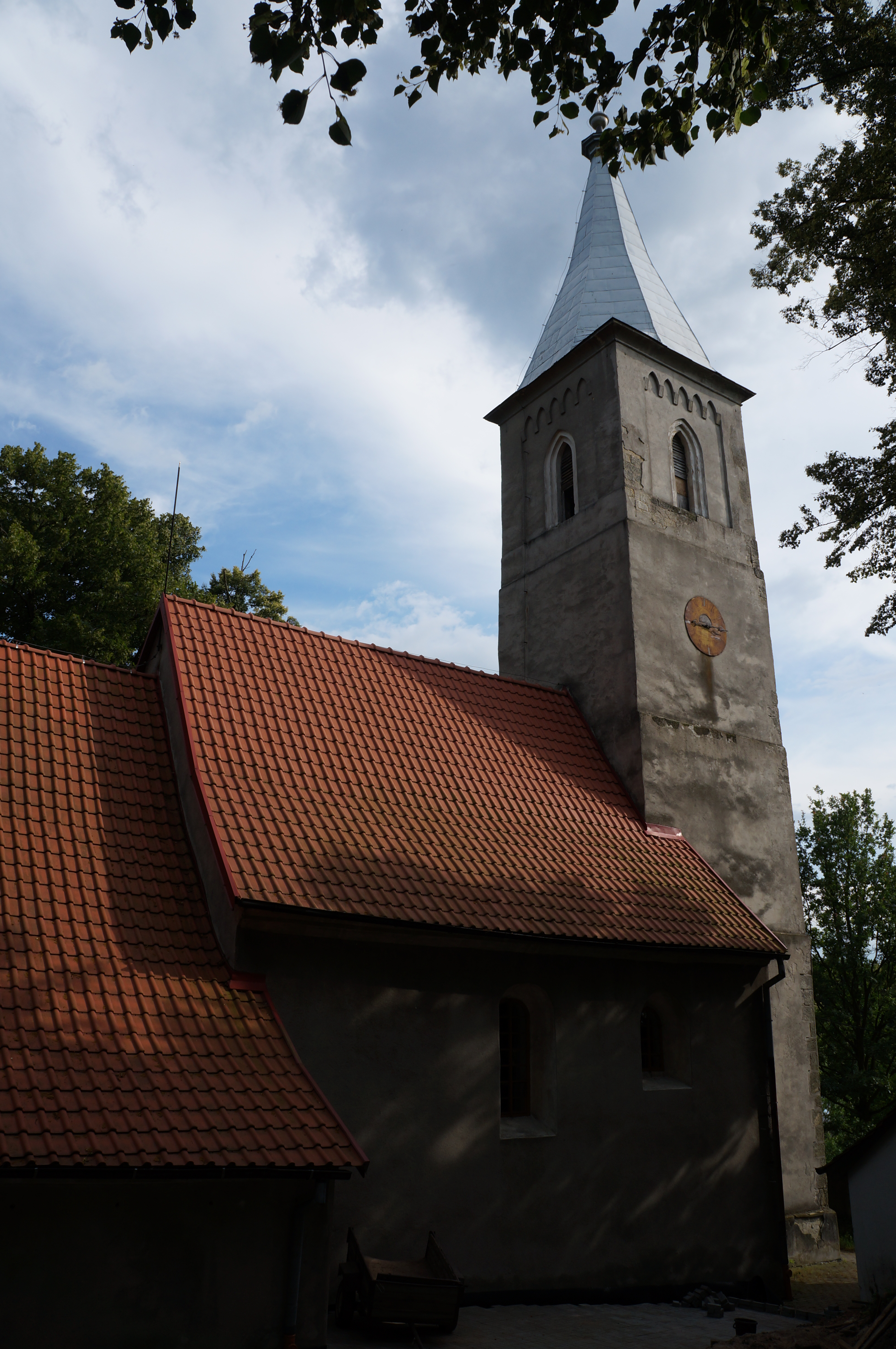
- Saint Hedwig church in Kraszowice

- Location within Poland
- Coordinates: 51°12′57″N 15°31′08″E
- Country: Poland
- Voivodeship: Lower Silesian
- County: Bolesławiec
- Gmina: Bolesławiec
- Population: 270
- Time zone: UTC+1 (CET)
  - Summer (DST): UTC+2 (CEST)
- Vehicle registration: DBL

Kraszowice [kraʂɔˈvit͡sɛ] is a village in the administrative district of Gmina Bolesławiec, within Bolesławiec County, Lower Silesian Voivodeship, in south-western Poland.
