= Trzebień Mały =

- Village
- Location within Poland
- Coordinates: 51°23′48″N 15°34′38″E
- Country: Poland
- Voivodeship: Lower Silesian
- County (powiat): Bolesławiec
- Gmina: Bolesławiec

Trzebień Mały [ˈtʂɛbjɛɲ ˈmawɨ] is a village in the administrative district of Gmina Bolesławiec, within Bolesławiec County, Lower Silesian Voivodeship, in south-western Poland.
