= Otok, Lower Silesian Voivodeship =

Otok
- Village
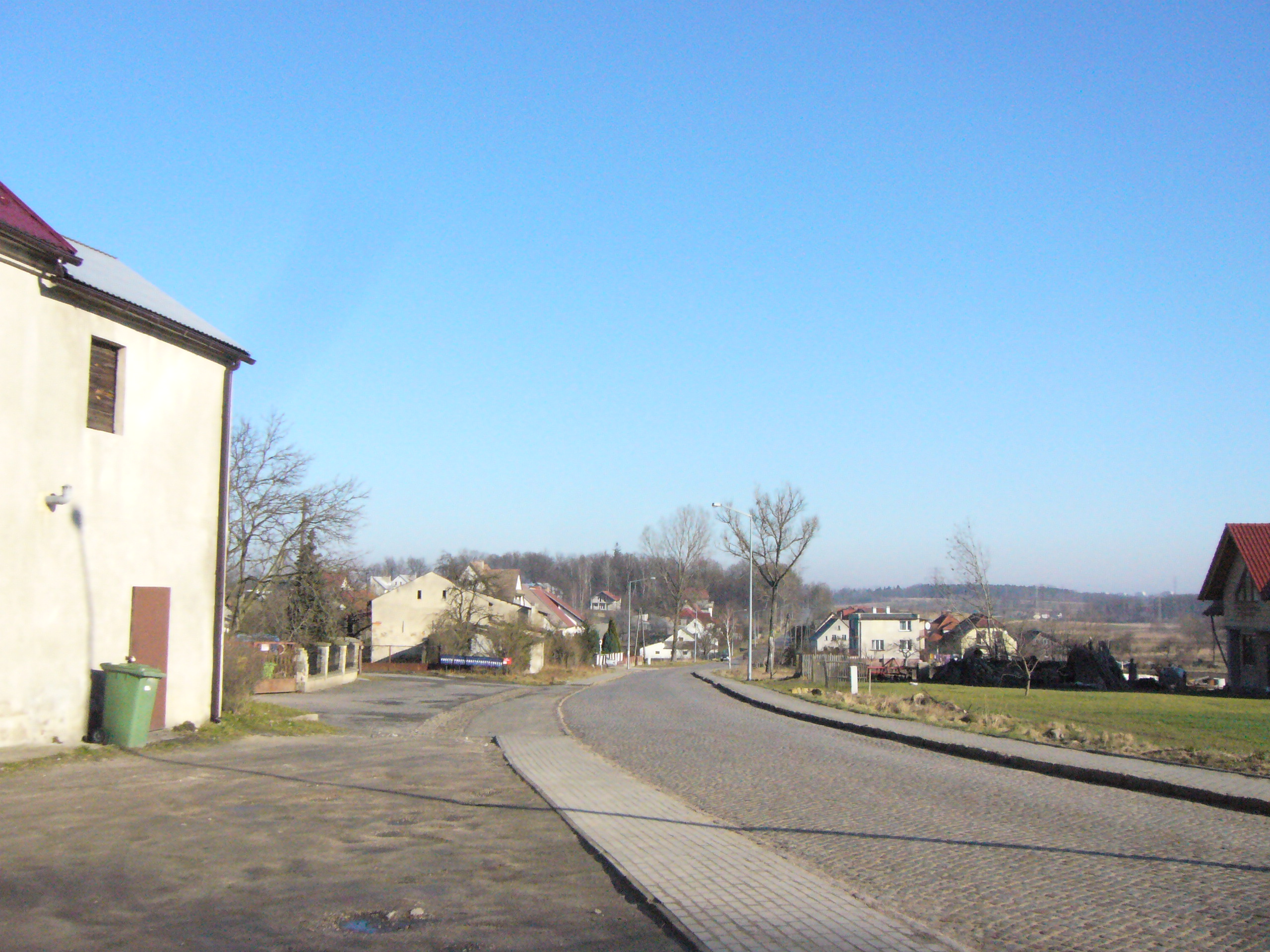

- Location within Poland
- Coordinates: 51°13′54″N 15°30′59″E
- Country: Poland
- Voivodeship: Lower Silesian
- County: Bolesławiec
- Gmina: Bolesławiec
- Time zone: UTC+1
  - Summer (DST): UTC+2 (CEST)
- Vehicle registration: DBL

Otok [ˈɔtɔk] is a village in the administrative district of Gmina Bolesławiec, within Bolesławiec County, Lower Silesian Voivodeship, in south-western Poland.
