= Kraśnik Górny =

- Village
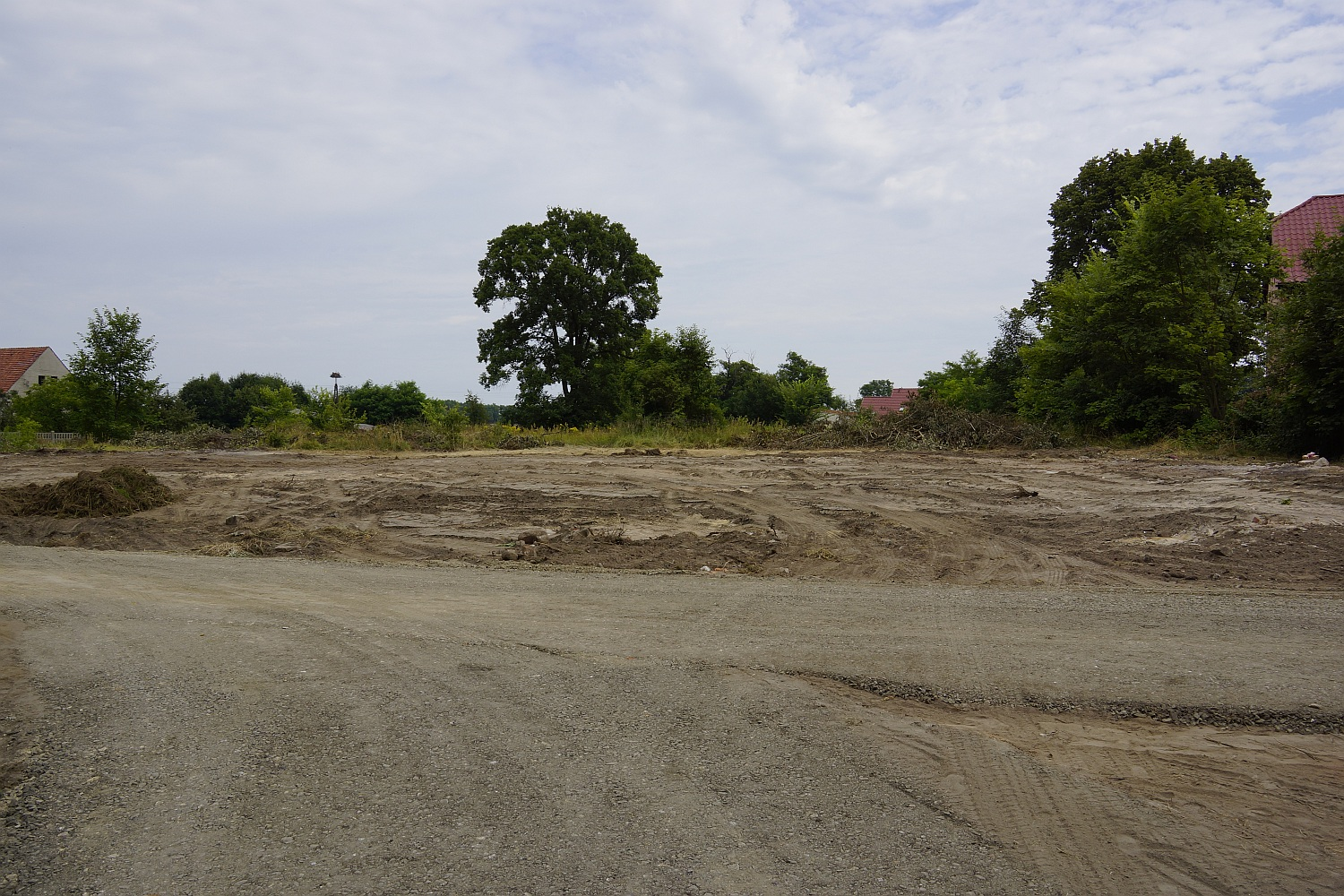
- Manor ruins

- Location within Poland
- Coordinates: 51°17′48″N 15°37′39″E
- Country: Poland
- Voivodeship: Lower Silesian
- County: Bolesławiec
- Gmina: Bolesławiec

Population
  - Total: 450
- Time zone: UTC+1 (CET)
  - Summer (DST): UTC+2 (CEST)
- Vehicle registration: DBL

Kraśnik Górny [ˈkraɕnik ˈɡurnɨ] is a village in the administrative district of Gmina Bolesławiec, within Bolesławiec County, Lower Silesian Voivodeship, in south-western Poland.
