= Kruszyn =

Kruszyn may refer to the following places in Poland:

- Kruszyn, Lower Silesian Voivodeship (south-west Poland)
- Kruszyn, Bydgoszcz County in Kuyavian-Pomeranian Voivodeship (north-central Poland)
- Kruszyn, Włocławek County in Kuyavian-Pomeranian Voivodeship (north-central Poland)
- Kruszyn, Podlaskie Voivodeship (north-east Poland)
- Kruszyn, Pomeranian Voivodeship (north Poland)
