= Bolesławice =

Bolesławice may refer to the following places in Poland:

- Bolesławice, Bolesławiec County in Lower Silesian Voivodeship (south-west Poland)
- Bolesławice, Świdnica County in Lower Silesian Voivodeship (south-west Poland)
- Bolesławice, Pomeranian Voivodeship (north Poland)
- Bolesławice, West Pomeranian Voivodeship (north-west Poland)
