= Brzeźnik, Lower Silesian Voivodeship =

Brzeźnik
- Village
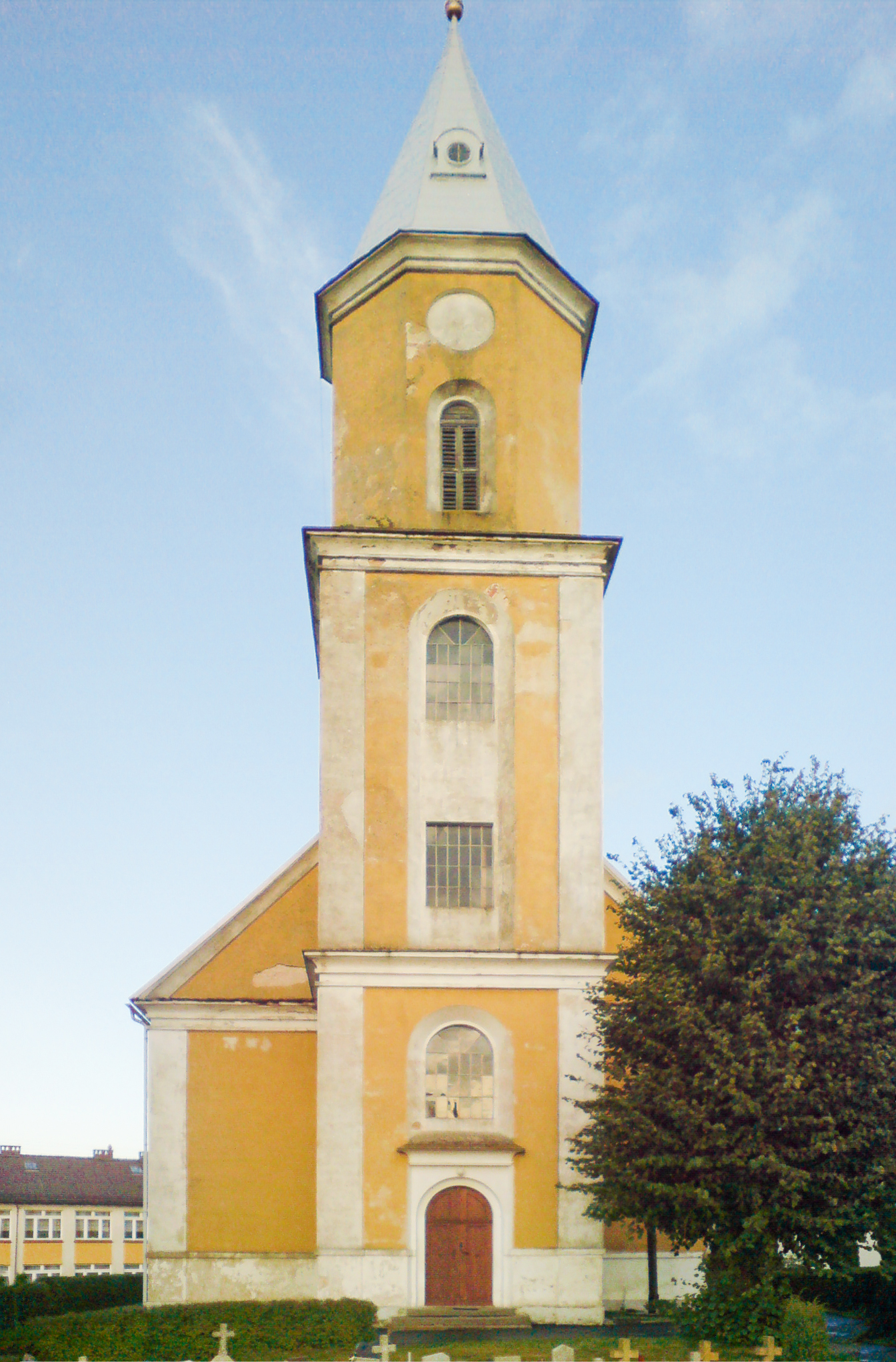

- Location within Poland
- Coordinates: 51°14′38″N 15°28′08″E
- Country: Poland
- Voivodeship: Lower Silesian
- County: Bolesławiec
- Gmina: Bolesławiec (rural)
- Time zone: UTC+1 (CET)
  - Summer (DST): UTC+2 (CEST)

Brzeźnik [ˈbʐɛʑnik] is a village in the administrative district of Gmina Bolesławiec, within Bolesławiec County, Lower Silesian Voivodeship, in south-western Poland.
