= Mierzwin, Lower Silesian Voivodeship =

Mierzwin
- Village
- Location within Poland
- Coordinates: 51°14′2″N 15°28′39″E
- Country: Poland
- Voivodeship: Lower Silesian
- County: Bolesławiec
- Gmina: Bolesławiec
- Population: 230
- Time zone: UTC+1 (CET)
  - Summer (DST): UTC+2 (CEST)
- Vehicle registration: DBL

Mierzwin [ˈmjɛʐvin] is a village in the administrative district of Gmina Bolesławiec, within Bolesławiec County, Lower Silesian Voivodeship, in south-western Poland.
