= Stare Jaroszowice =

- Village
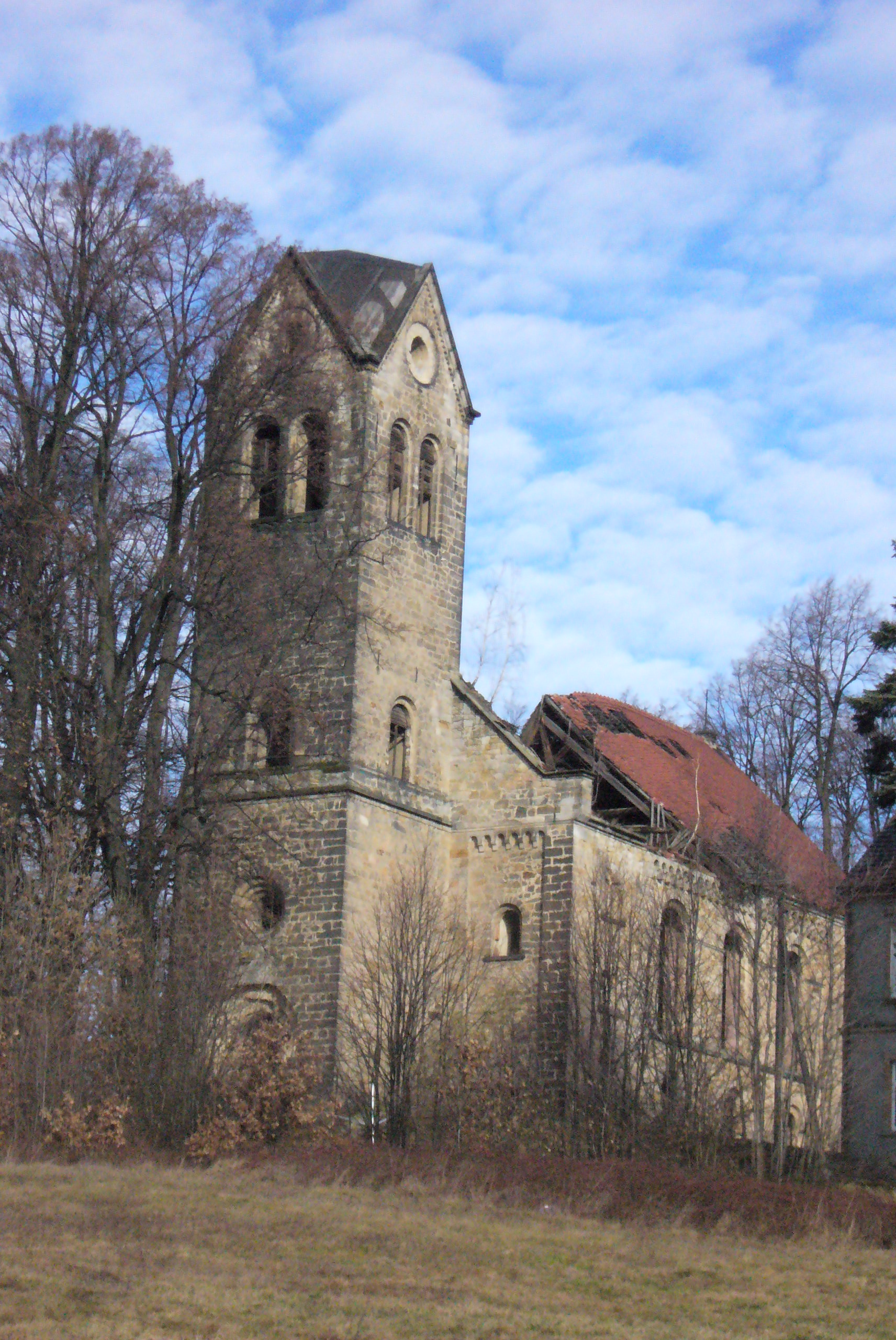
- Former church

- Location within Poland
- Coordinates: 51°12′41″N 15°36′54″E
- Country: Poland
- Voivodeship: Lower Silesian
- County (powiat): Bolesławiec
- Gmina: Bolesławiec
- Population: 310
- Time zone: UTC+1 (CET)
  - Summer (DST): UTC+2 (CEST)
- Vehicle registration: DBL

Stare Jaroszowice [ˈstarɛ jarɔʂɔˈvit͡sɛ] is a village in the administrative district of Gmina Bolesławiec, within Bolesławiec County, Lower Silesian Voivodeship, in south-western Poland.
