= Trzebień, Lower Silesian Voivodeship =

Trzebień
- Village
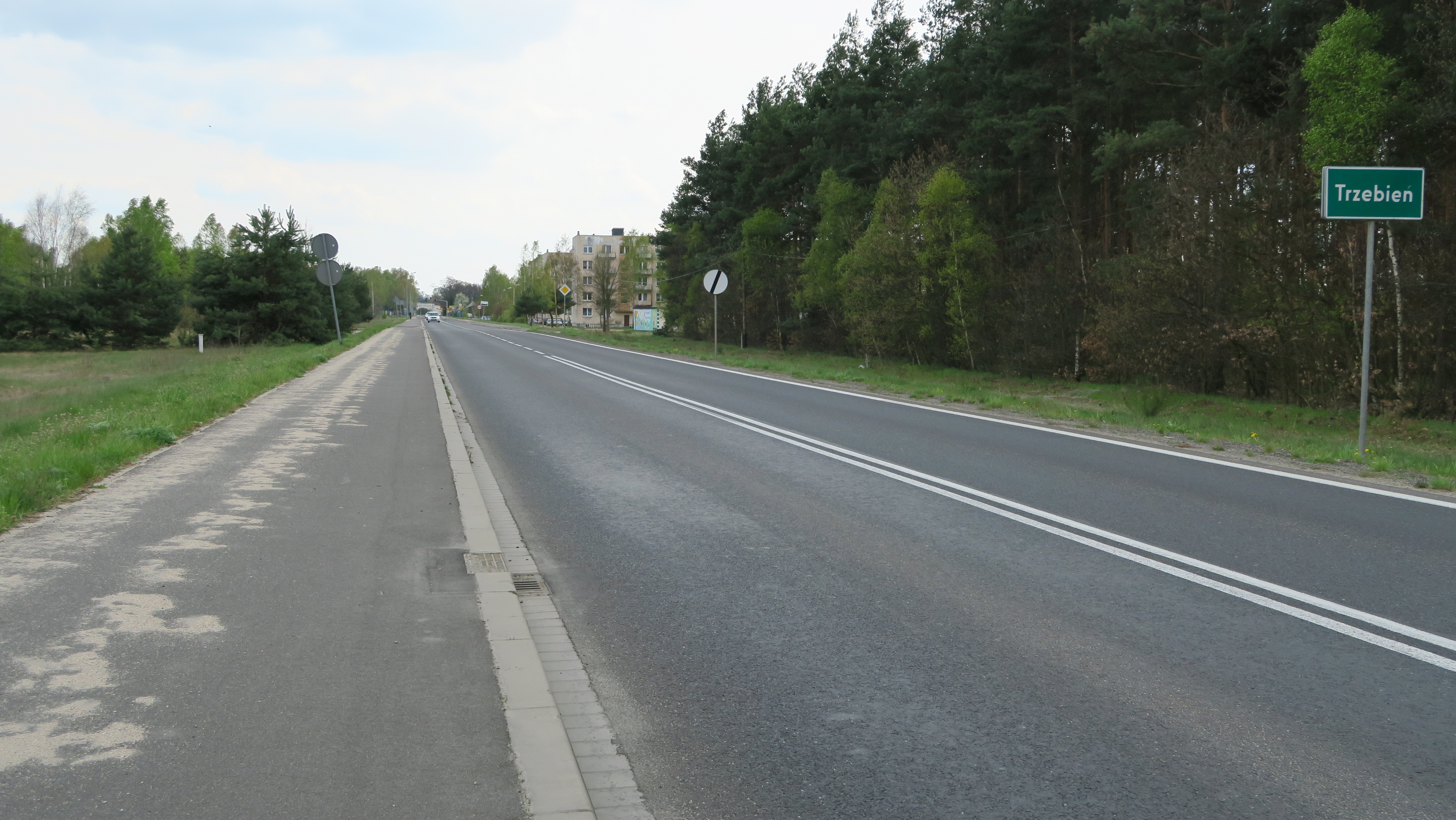
- Entrance to Trzebień from Nowa Sól

- Location within Poland
- Coordinates: 51°23′15″N 15°35′52″E
- Country: Poland
- Voivodeship: Lower Silesian
- County (powiat): Bolesławiec
- Gmina: Bolesławiec

Population
  - Total: 770
- Time zone: UTC+1 (CET)
  - Summer (DST): UTC+2 (CEST)
- Vehicle registration: DBL

Trzebień [ˈtʂɛbjɛɲ] (German: Kittlitztreben) is a village in the administrative district of Gmina Bolesławiec, within Bolesławiec County, Lower Silesian Voivodeship, in south-western Poland.

== History ==
The village was mentioned in the Liber fundationis episcopatus Vratislaviensis from c. 1305, when it was part of Piast-ruled Poland.

During World War II, the Germans established and operated a subcamp of the Gross-Rosen concentration camp in the village, whose prisoners were about 1,700-1,800 Jews, many of whom died. Prisoners were mostly brought from other camps, including from Żagań, Zielona Góra, Görlitz, Frývaldov and Miłoszyce. At least two prisoners made unsuccessful escape attempts, for which they were executed. Around 1,000 prisoners were evacuated in February 1945 in a death march to camps in Görlitz, Zittau and the Gross-Rosen and Buchenwald concentration camps, while 300 severely ill prisoners were left in the camp, where they were liberated by Soviet troops. There is one known case of a successful escape during the death march.

During the 2024 Central European floods, in Trzebień, Polish firefighters rescued two American soldiers stationed in Poland who were swept away by the Bóbr River.

== Transport ==
The A18 motorway passes south of the village.

== Notable residents ==
- Helmut Bruck (1913–2001), Luftwaffe officer
