= Chościszowice =

- Village
- Location within Poland
- Coordinates: 51°17′16″N 15°35′25″E
- Country: Poland
- Voivodeship: Lower Silesian
- County: Bolesławiec
- Gmina: Gmina Bolesławiec

Population
  - Total: 60
- Time zone: UTC+1 (CET)
  - Summer (DST): UTC+2 (CEST)

Chościszowice [xɔɕt͡ɕiʂɔˈvit͡sɛ] is a village in the administrative district of Gmina Bolesławiec, within Bolesławiec County, Lower Silesian Voivodeship, in south-western Poland.
