= Godnów =

- Village
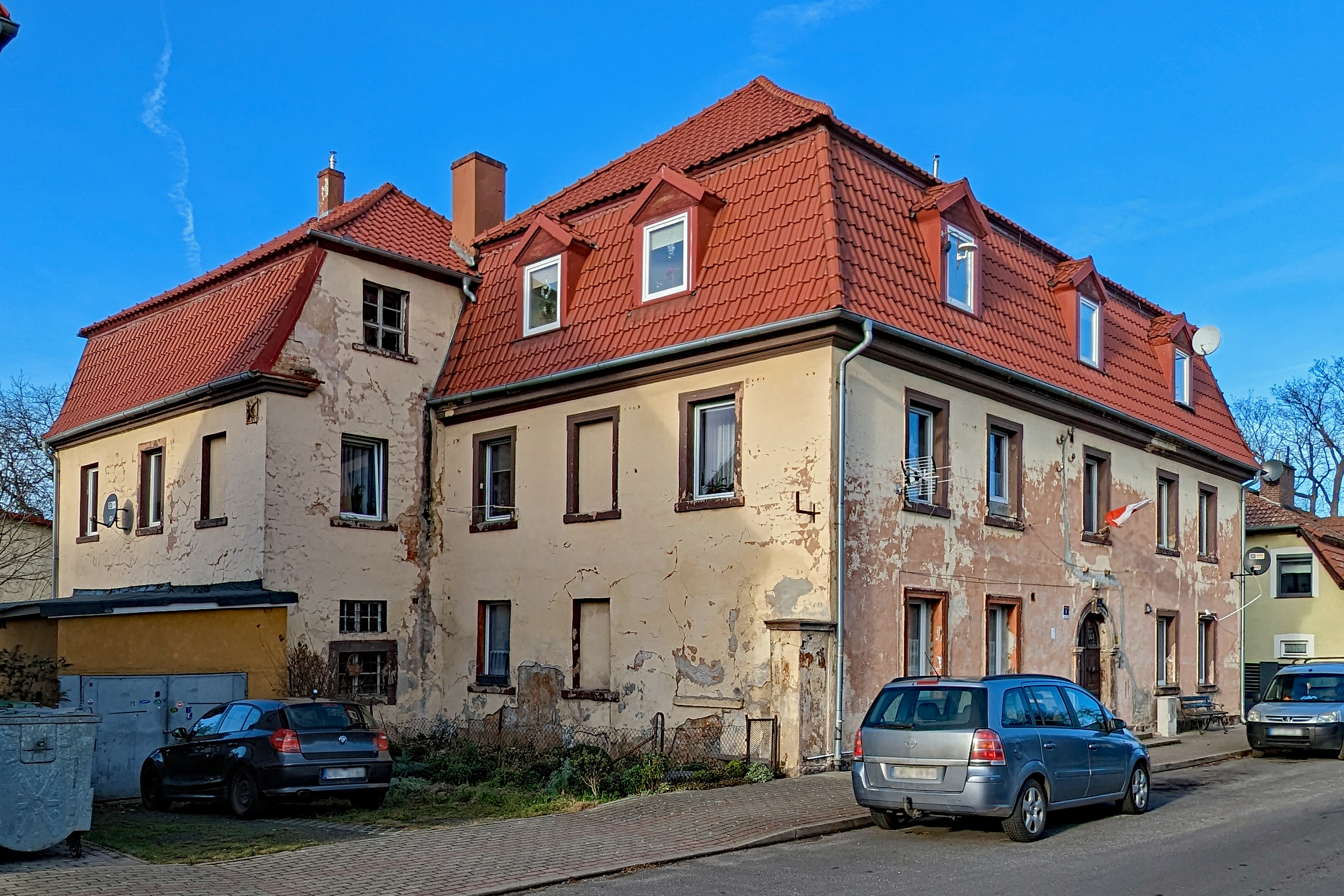

- Location within Poland
- Coordinates: 51°15′25″N 15°37′07″E
- Country: Poland
- Voivodeship: Lower Silesian
- County: Bolesławiec
- Gmina: Bolesławiec
- Time zone: UTC+1 (CET)
  - Summer (DST): UTC+2
- Postal code: 59-700
- Vehicle registration: DBL
- SIMC: 0189144

Godnów (until 1946; Gnadenberg) is a village in the administrative district of Gmina Bolesławiec, within Bolesławiec County, Lower Silesian Voivodeship, in south-western Poland.
