= Żeliszów =

- Village
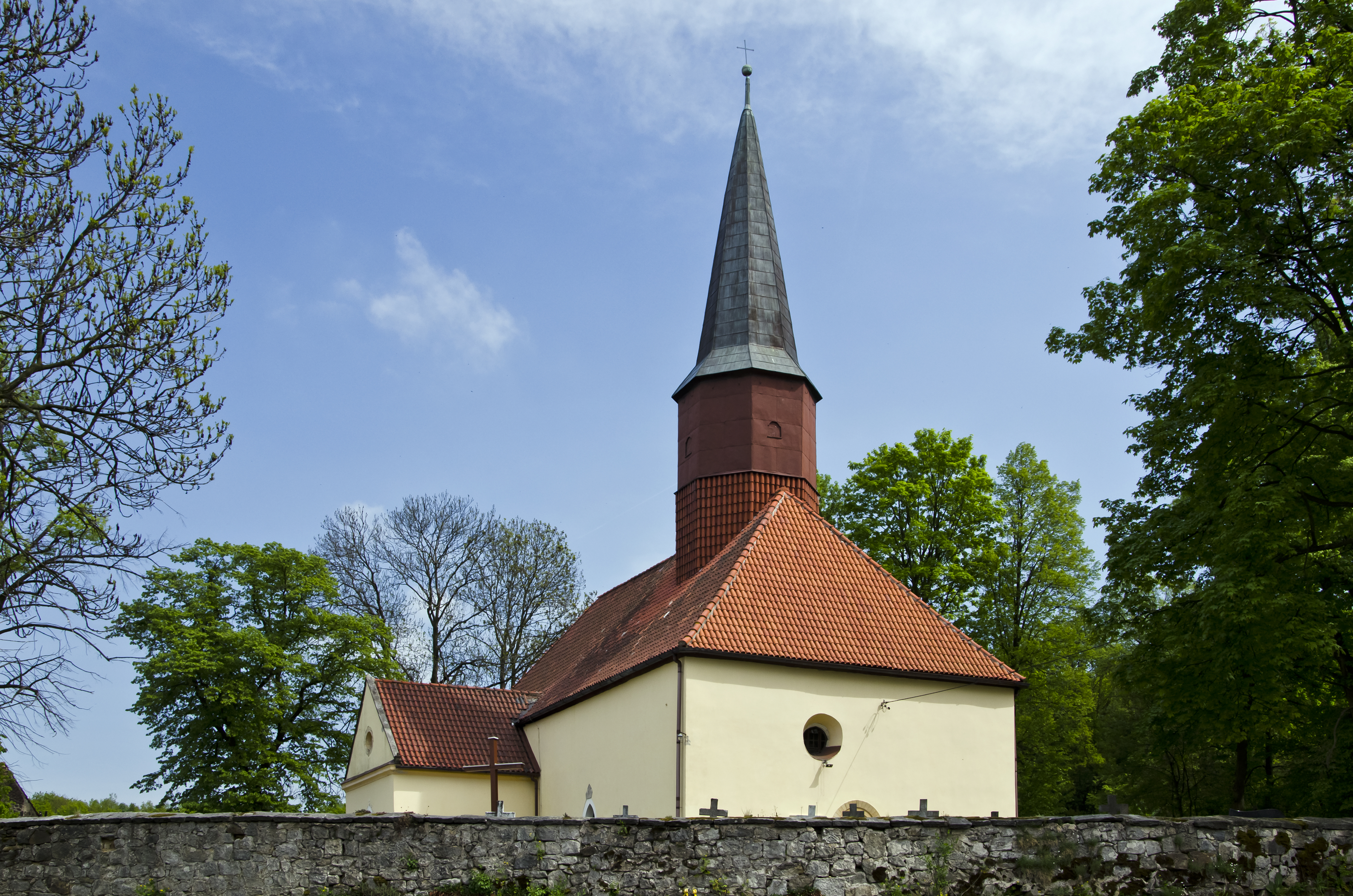
- Saint John of Nepomuk church in Żeliszów

- Location within Poland
- Coordinates: 51°11′N 15°38′E
- Country: Poland
- Voivodeship: Lower Silesian
- County (powiat): Bolesławiec
- Gmina: Bolesławiec
- Time zone: UTC+1 (CET)
  - Summer (DST): UTC+2 (CEST)
- Vehicle registration: DBL

Żeliszów [ʐɛˈliʂuf] (German: Giersdorf) is a village in the administrative district of Gmina Bolesławiec, within Bolesławiec County, Lower Silesian Voivodeship, in south-western Poland.

The village houses a Protestant church designed in 1796-1797 by Carl Gotthard Langhans, which is currently undergoing renovation overseen by the Your Heritage Foundation (Fundacja Twoje Dziedzictwo).
