= Łaziska, Lower Silesian Voivodeship =

Łaziska
- Village
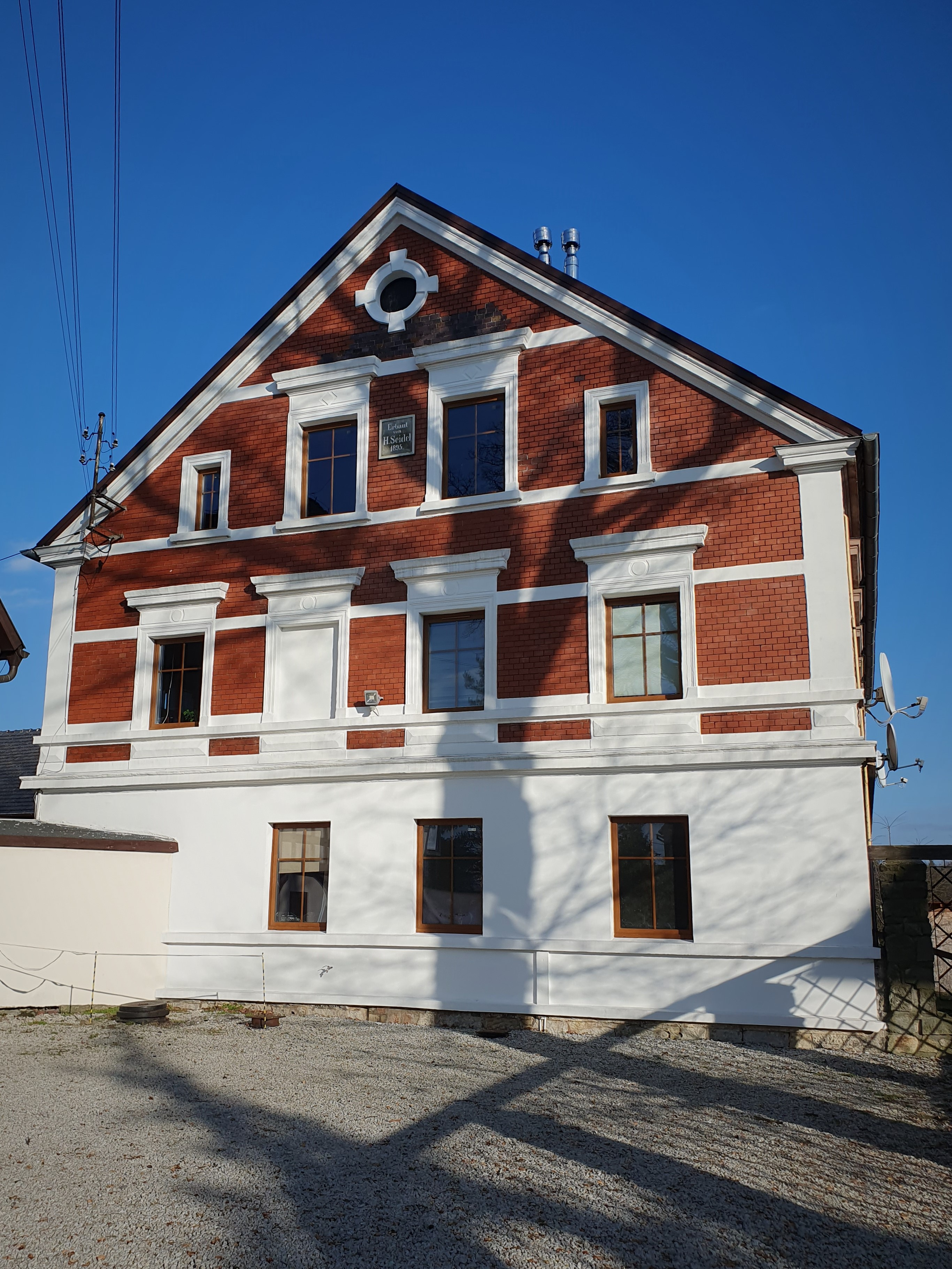

- Location within Poland
- Coordinates: 51°14′22″N 15°36′31″E
- Country: Poland
- Voivodeship: Lower Silesian
- County: Bolesławiec
- Gmina: Bolesławiec
- Population: 560
- Time zone: UTC+1 (CET)
  - Summer (DST): UTC+2 (CEST)
- Vehicle registration: DBL

Łaziska [waˈʑiska] is a village in the administrative district of Gmina Bolesławiec, within Bolesławiec County, Lower Silesian Voivodeship, in south-western Poland.
