= Lubków =

Lubków may refer to the following places in Poland:

- Lubków, Bolesławiec County in Lower Silesian Voivodeship (south-west Poland)
- Lubków, Lubin County in Lower Silesian Voivodeship (south-west Poland)
- Lubków, West Pomeranian Voivodeship (north-west Poland)
