= Wartowice =

- Village
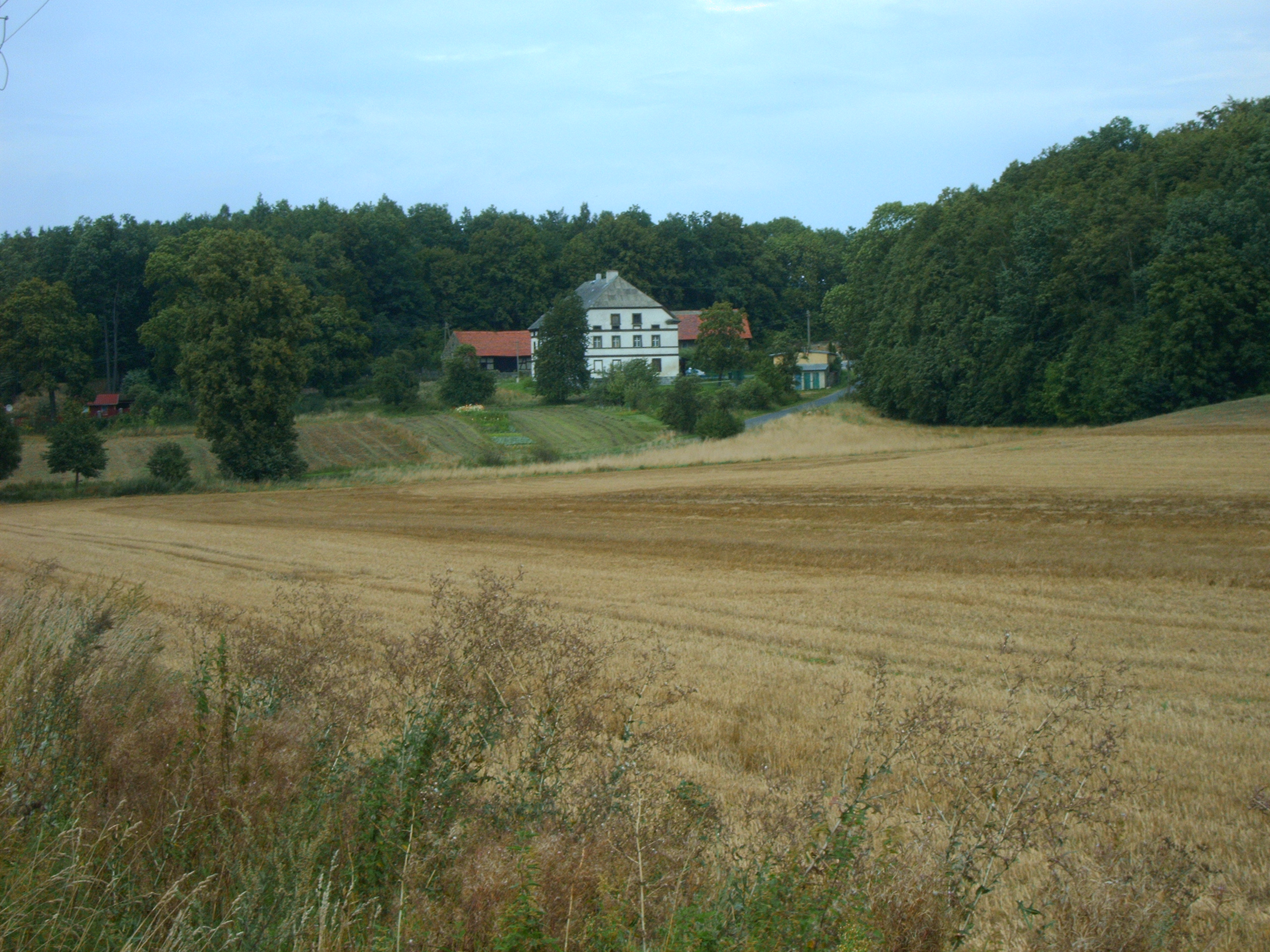

- Location within Poland
- Coordinates: 51°13′16″N 15°38′59″E
- Country: Poland
- Voivodeship: Lower Silesian
- County: Bolesławiec
- Gmina: Warta Bolesławiecka

Wartowice [vartɔˈvit͡sɛ] is a village in the administrative district of Gmina Warta Bolesławiecka, within Bolesławiec County, Lower Silesian Voivodeship, in south-western Poland.
