= Dąbrowa Bolesławiecka =

- Village
- Location within Poland
- Coordinates: 51°19′36″N 15°34′45″E
- Country: Poland
- Voivodeship: Lower Silesian
- County: Bolesławiec
- Gmina: Bolesławiec
- Time zone: UTC+1 (CET)
  - Summer (DST): UTC+2 (CEST)
- Vehicle registration: DBL

Dąbrowa Bolesławiecka [dɔmˈbrɔva bɔlɛswaˈvjɛt͡ska] is a village in the administrative district of Gmina Bolesławiec, within Bolesławiec County, Lower Silesian Voivodeship, in south-western Poland.

== History ==
The village was mentioned as Dambrowa in a document from 1305, when it was part of fragmented Piast-ruled Poland.

During World War II, the Germans operated a forced labour subcamp of the Stalag VIII-B/344 prisoner-of-war camp in the village.

== Transport ==
The Polish A4 motorway and Voivodeship road 297 run through the village, and the A18 motorway runs nearby, northeast of the village.
