= Suszki =

- Village
- Location within Poland
- Coordinates: 51°11′27″N 15°34′3″E
- Country: Poland
- Voivodeship: Lower Silesian
- County (powiat): Bolesławiec
- Gmina: Bolesławiec

Suszki [ˈsuʂki] is a village in the administrative district of Gmina Bolesławiec, within Bolesławiec County, Lower Silesian Voivodeship, in south-western Poland.
