= Kraśnik Dolny =

- Village
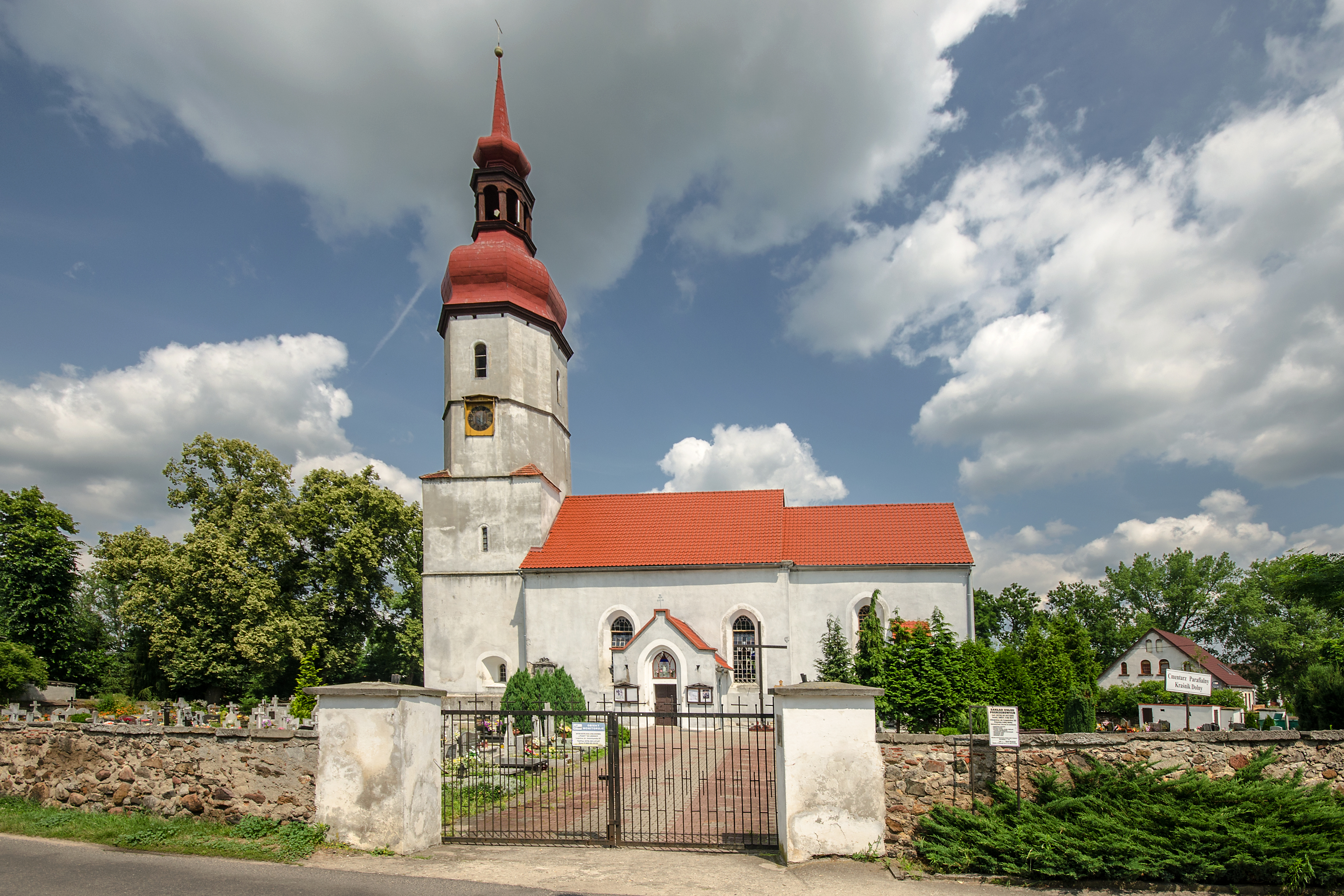
- Salvator church in Kraśnik Dolny

- Location within Poland
- Coordinates: 51°18′N 15°36′E
- Country: Poland
- Voivodeship: Lower Silesian
- County: Bolesławiec
- Gmina: Bolesławiec
- Elevation: 175 m (574 ft)

Population
  - Total: 640
  - Density: 65/km^{2} (170/sq mi)
- (approximate)
- Time zone: UTC+1 (CET)
  - Summer (DST): UTC+2 (CEST)
- Vehicle registration: DBL

Kraśnik Dolny [ˈkraɕnik ˈdɔlnɨ] is a village in the administrative district of Gmina Bolesławiec, within Bolesławiec County, Lower Silesian Voivodeship, in south-western Poland.

The land around the town is very flat, being mostly wheat fields and other farmland.

== Climate ==
The climate is hemiboreal, with an average temperature of 8 °C. The coldest month, January, has an average temperature of -6 °C, with the warmest month, July, being 19 °C.
