= Lipiany, Lower Silesian Voivodeship =

Lipiany
- Village
- Location within Poland
- Coordinates: 51°20′31″N 15°38′01″E
- Country: Poland
- Voivodeship: Lower Silesian
- County: Bolesławiec
- Gmina: Bolesławiec
- Population: 160

Lipiany [liˈpjanɨ] is a village in the administrative district of Gmina Bolesławiec, within Bolesławiec County, Lower Silesian Voivodeship, in south-western Poland.
