= Raciborowice Górne =

- Village
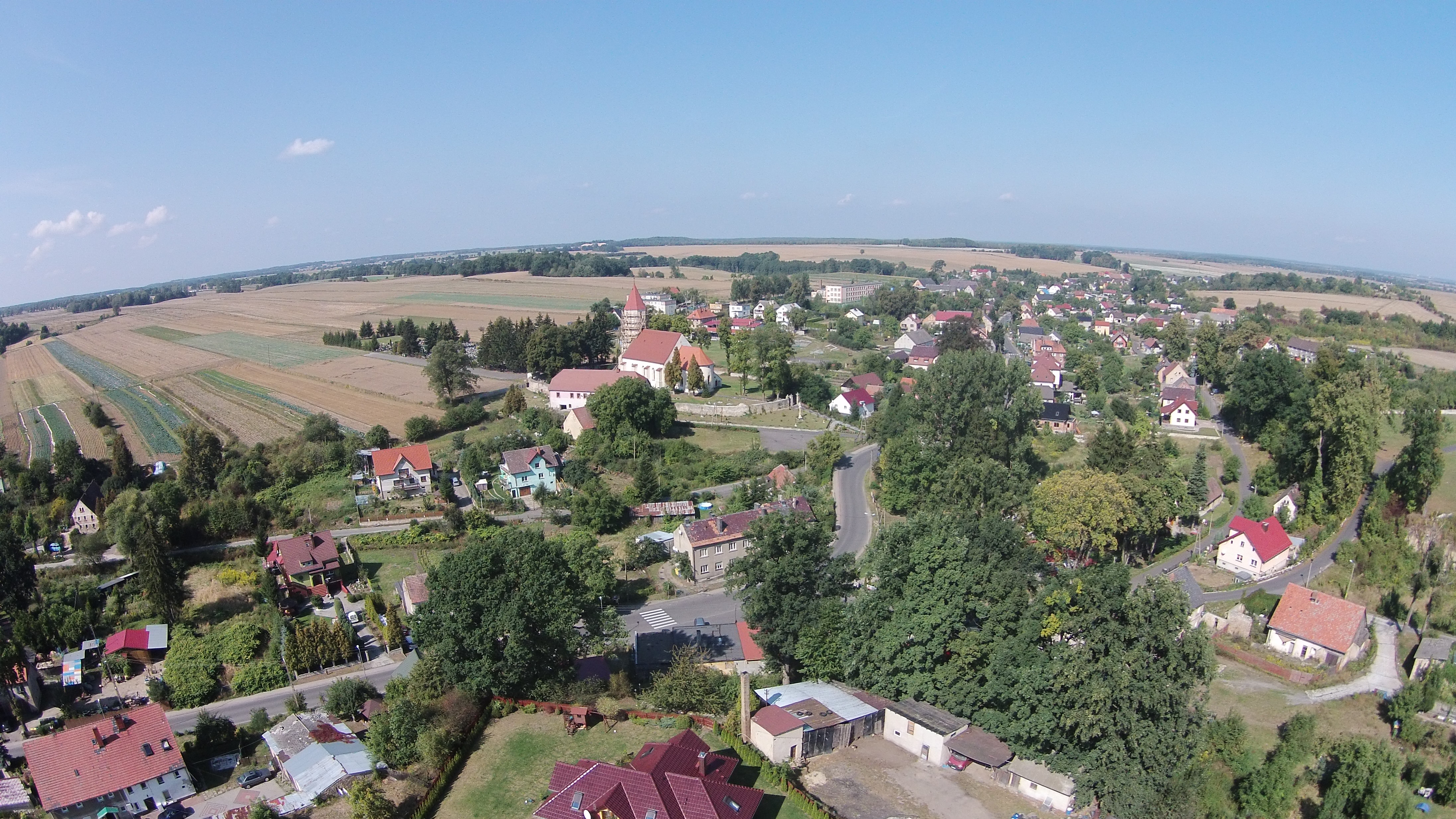

- Location within Poland
- Coordinates: 51°12′N 15°42′E
- Country: Poland
- Voivodeship: Lower Silesian
- County: Bolesławiec
- Gmina: Warta Bolesławiecka

Raciborowice Górne [rat͡ɕibɔrɔˈvit͡sɛ ˈɡurnɛ] is a village in the administrative district of Gmina Warta Bolesławiecka, within Bolesławiec County, Lower Silesian Voivodeship, in south-western Poland.
