= Szczytnica =

- Village
- Location within Poland
- Coordinates: 51°16′49″N 15°42′25″E
- Country: Poland
- Voivodeship: Lower Silesian
- County: Bolesławiec
- Gmina: Warta Bolesławiecka

Szczytnica [ʂt͡ʂɨtˈnit͡sa] is a village in the administrative district of Gmina Warta Bolesławiecka, within Bolesławiec County, Lower Silesian Voivodeship, in south-western Poland.
