= Raciborowice Dolne =

- Village
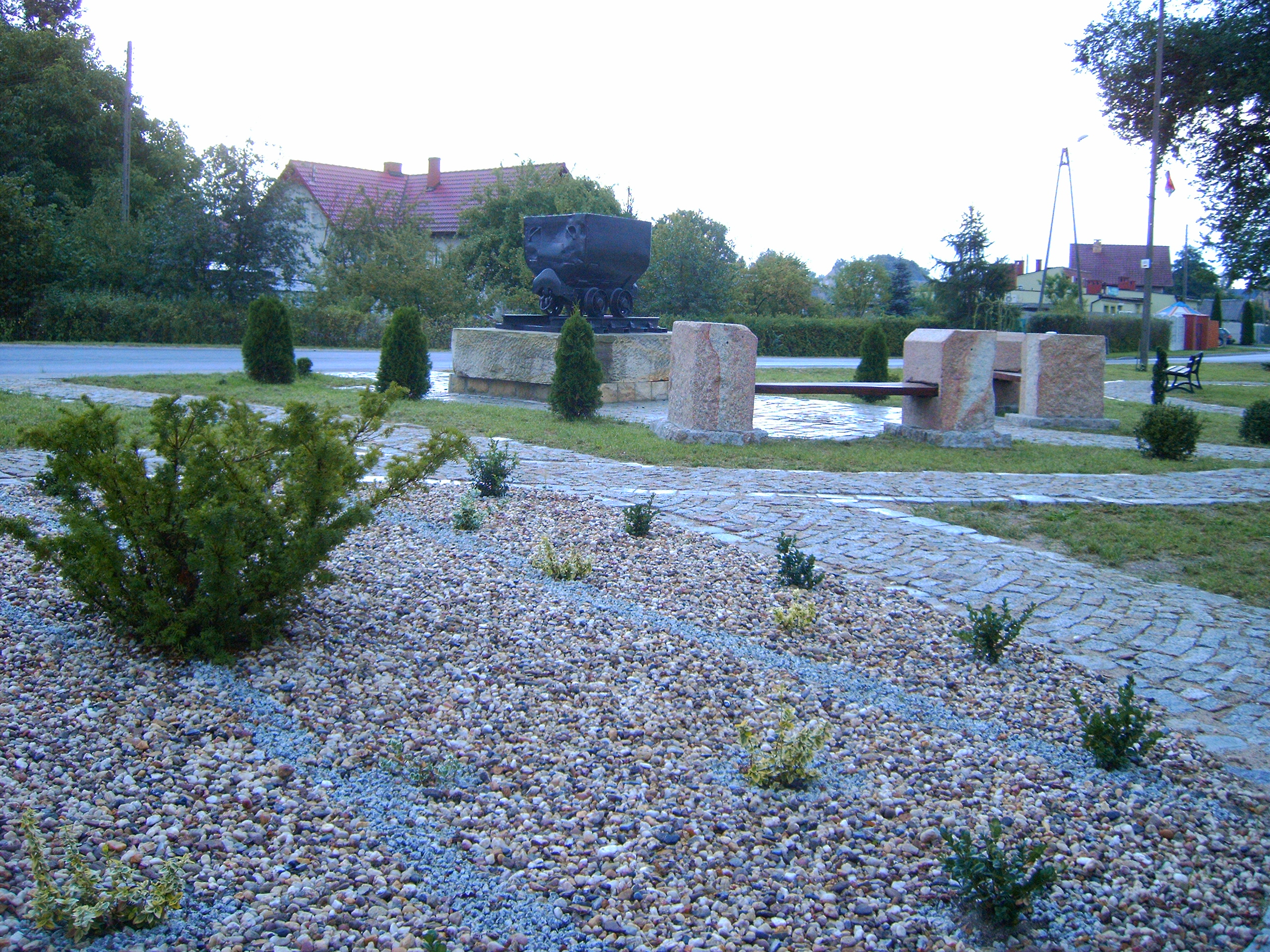

- Location within Poland
- Coordinates: 51°13′N 15°43′E
- Country: Poland
- Voivodeship: Lower Silesian
- County: Bolesławiec
- Gmina: Warta Bolesławiecka

Raciborowice Dolne [rat͡ɕibɔrɔˈvit͡sɛ ˈdɔlnɛ] is a village in the administrative district of Gmina Warta Bolesławiecka, within Bolesławiec County, Lower Silesian Voivodeship, in south-western Poland.
