= Jurków, Lower Silesian Voivodeship =

Jurków
- Village
- Location within Poland
- Coordinates: 51°11′39″N 15°44′48″E
- Country: Poland
- Voivodeship: Lower Silesian
- County: Bolesławiec
- Gmina: Warta Bolesławiecka

Jurków [ˈjurkuf] is a village in the administrative district of Gmina Warta Bolesławiecka, within Bolesławiec County, Lower Silesian Voivodeship, in south-western Poland.
