= Bożejowice =

- Village
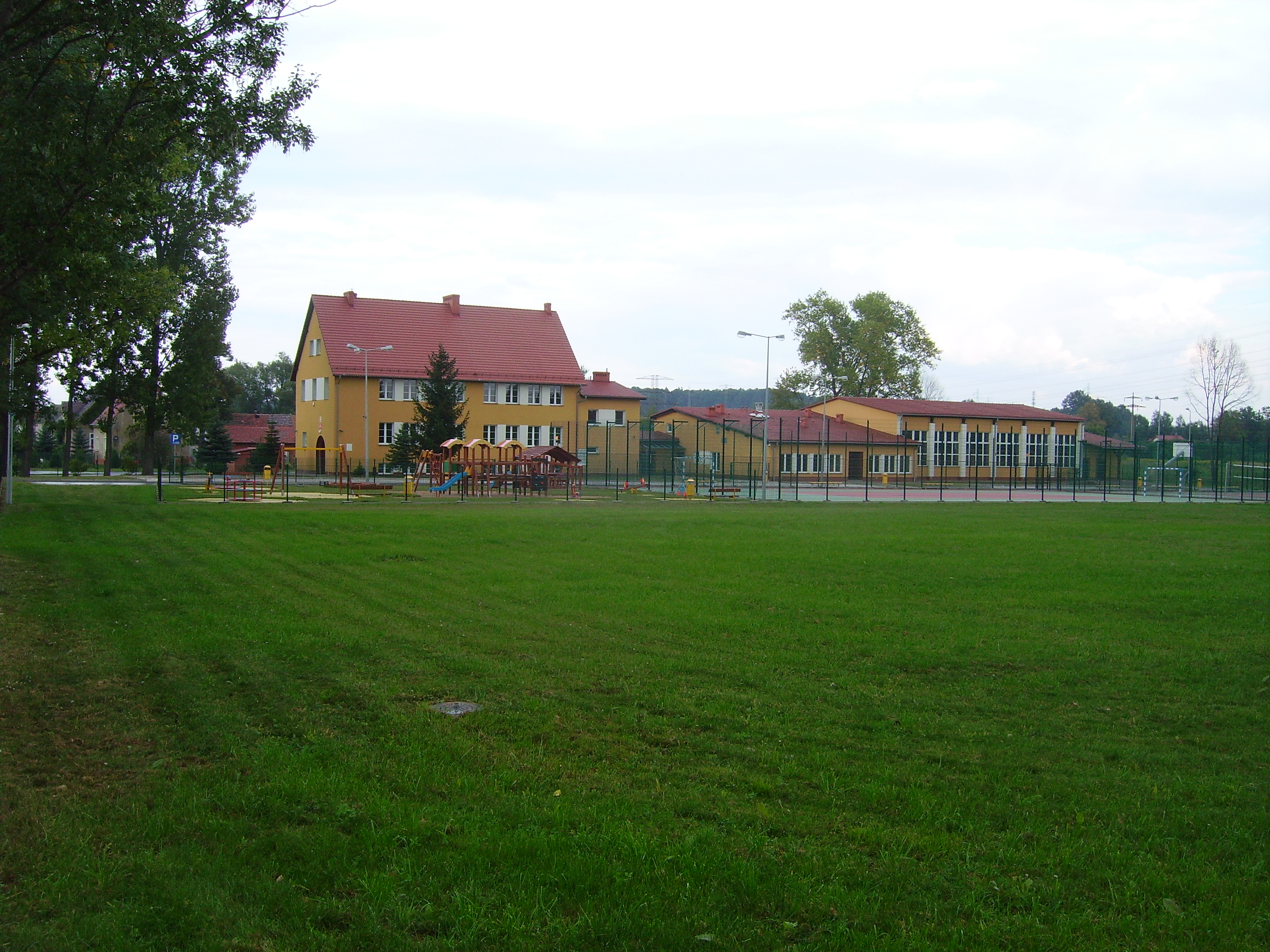
- School in Bożejowice (2013)

- Location within Poland
- Coordinates: 51°14′27″N 15°33′05″E
- Country: Poland
- Voivodeship: Lower Silesian
- County: Bolesławiec
- Gmina: Bolesławiec
- Time zone: UTC+1 (CET)
  - Summer (DST): UTC+2 (CEST)

Bożejowice [bɔʐɛjɔˈvit͡sɛ] is a village in the administrative district of Gmina Bolesławiec, within Bolesławiec County, Lower Silesian Voivodeship, in south-western Poland.
