= Nowe Jaroszowice =

- Village
- Location within Poland
- Coordinates: 51°12′55″N 15°34′01″E
- Country: Poland
- Voivodeship: Lower Silesian
- County: Bolesławiec
- Gmina: Bolesławiec
- Population: 220
- Time zone: UTC+1 (CET)
  - Summer (DST): UTC+2 (CEST)
- Vehicle registration: DBL

Nowe Jaroszowice [ˈnɔvɛ jarɔʂɔˈvit͡sɛ] is a village in the administrative district of Gmina Bolesławiec, within Bolesławiec County, Lower Silesian Voivodeship, in South-Western Poland.
