= Kozłów, Bolesławiec County =

Kozłów
- Village
- Location within Poland
- Coordinates: 51°25′54″N 15°35′56″E
- Country: Poland
- Voivodeship: Lower Silesian
- County: Bolesławiec
- Gmina: Bolesławiec
- Population: 50
- Time zone: UTC+1 (CET)
  - Summer (DST): UTC+2 (CEST)
- Vehicle registration: DBL

Kozłów [ˈkɔzwuf] is a village in the administrative district of Gmina Bolesławiec, within Bolesławiec County, Lower Silesian Voivodeship, in south-western Poland.

The Kozłow Desert is located near the village.
