= Parkoszów =

- Village
- Location within Poland
- Coordinates: 51°22′N 15°34′E
- Country: Poland
- Voivodeship: Lower Silesian
- County: Bolesławiec
- Gmina: Bolesławiec

Parkoszów [parˈkɔʂuf] is a village in the administrative district of Gmina Bolesławiec, within Bolesławiec County, Lower Silesian Voivodeship, in south-western Poland.
