= Iwiny, Bolesławiec County =

Iwiny
- Village
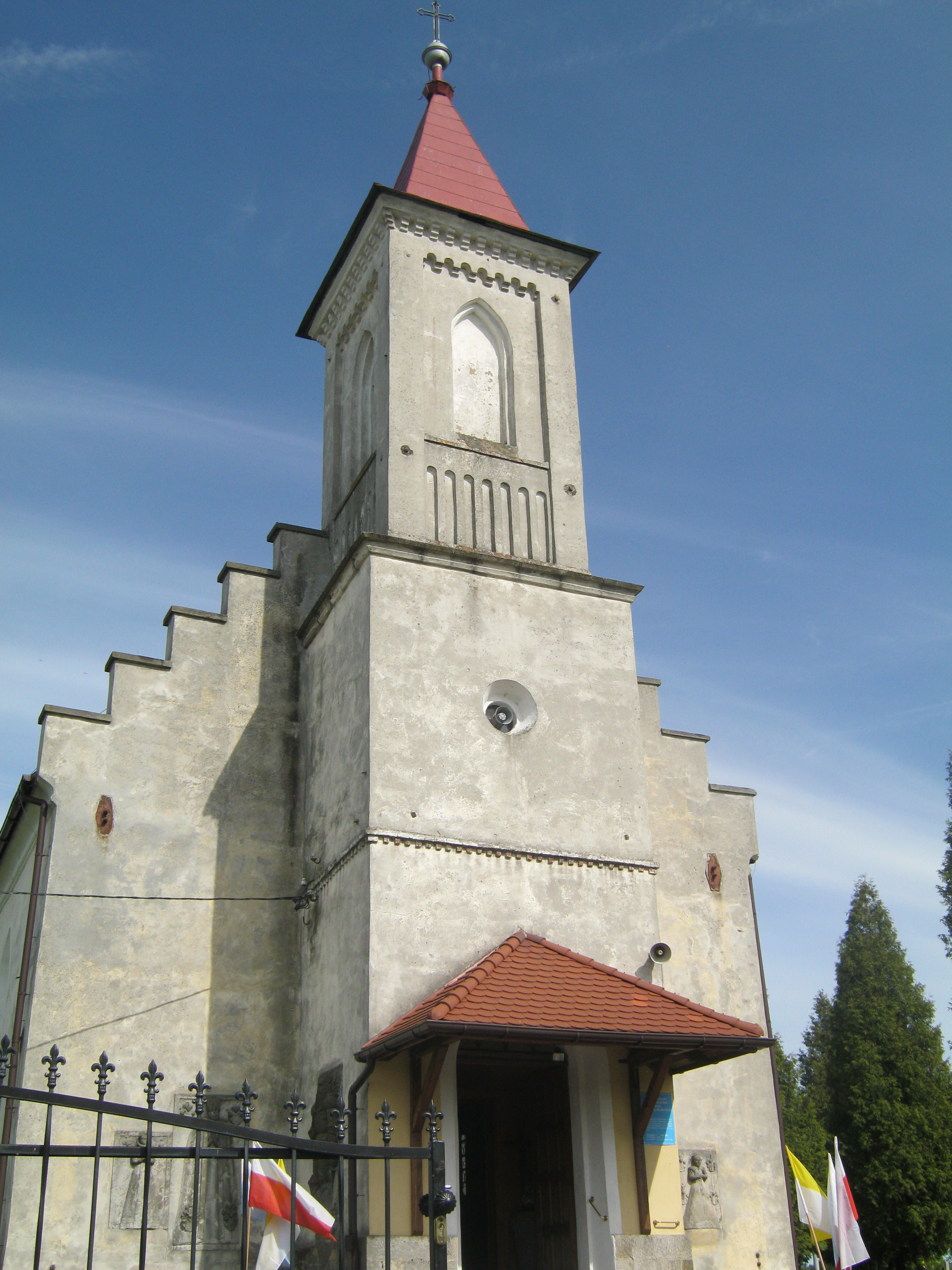
- Church

- Location within Poland
- Coordinates: 51°13′02″N 15°43′02″E
- Country: Poland
- Voivodeship: Lower Silesian
- County: Bolesławiec
- Gmina: Warta Bolesławiecka
- Population: 160

Iwiny [iˈvinɨ] is a village in the administrative district of Gmina Warta Bolesławiecka, within Bolesławiec County, Lower Silesian Voivodeship, in south-western Poland.
