= Ocice =

Ocice may refer to the following places in Poland:

- Ocice in Gmina Bolesławiec, Lower Silesian Voivodeshi
- Ocice (Racibórz), in Racibórz district
- Ocice (Tarnobrzeg), in Tarnobrzeg district
  - Ocice (stacja kolejowa), railway station in Ocice (Tarnobrzeg)
