= Kozłow Desert =

Sandy geographical area in Poland

Kozłów Desert
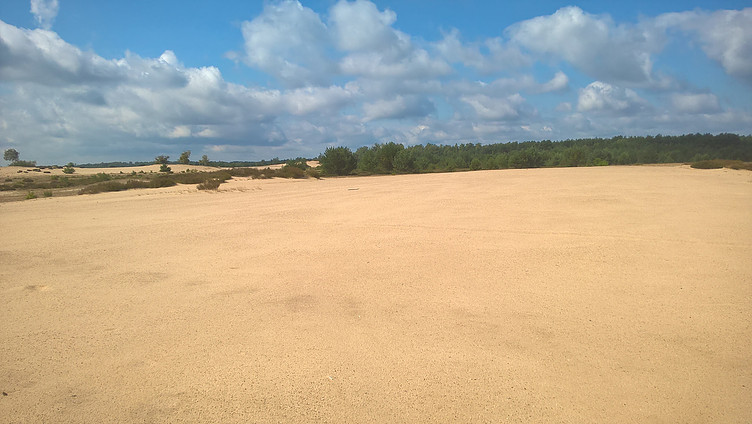
- Area: 0.2 km^{2} (0.077 mi^{2})

Naming
- Native name: Pustynia Kozłowska (Polish)

Geography
- Country: Poland

The Kozłow Desert (Polish: Pustynia Kozłowska) is an area of sand dunes in the Lower Silesian Forest near the village of Kozłow, approximately 17 km south-east of Szprotawa in Lubusz Voivodeship, Żagań County, southern Poland, on the border between the municipalities of Gromadka and Bolesławiec. The desert is part of the Przemkowski Landscape Park.

The dunes formed as a result of glacial action in the area. The "desert" was formed as a result of military exercises in the area, particularly as a result of the destruction of vegetation by rocket exercises from the 1920s onwards, first under the Germans and then later under the Soviets, which exposed the sand-dunes. The area was favoured for rocket exercises as the dunes formed a shield blocking the flight and explosion of rockets. The rocket exercises in the area finally ended in 1992 with the withdrawal of Soviet forces from Poland. The sandy area of the desert presently covers 20 hectares, though it is slowly being overgrown as vegetation recovers. The sandy area is divided by a central heath into a larger northern section (along the Długa Góra dune) and a smaller southern section (along the Gołębia Góra dune).

Together with the Starczynów Desert, the Kozłow Desert is part of the larger Lower Silesian Forest (Bory Dolnośląskie) Desert.
