= Bolesławice, Bolesławiec County =

Bolesławice
- Village
- Location within Poland
- Coordinates: 51°16′39″N 15°32′57″E
- Country: Poland
- Voivodeship: Lower Silesian
- County: Bolesławiec
- Gmina: Bolesławiec
- Elevation: 185 m (607 ft)

Population
  - Total: 590
- Time zone: UTC+1 (CET)
  - Summer (DST): UTC+2 (CEST)
- Postal code: 59-700
- Vehicle registration: DBL

Bolesławice [bɔlɛswaˈvit͡sɛ] is a village in the administrative district of Gmina Bolesławiec, within Bolesławiec County, Lower Silesian Voivodeship, in south-western Poland. It stretches for about 6.2 km along the left bank of the Bóbr River, at an altitude of about 180–190 m (590–620 ft) above sea level.

== History ==
Originally, the area was home to a tribal stronghold built by a Silesian tribe known as the Bobrzanie, followed by a Piast castellany until the 13th century. The village was first mentioned in 1274. In 1840, the village had 200 houses, including a manor farm, an Evangelical church with a school, a Catholic church, 4 inns, and a sandstone quarry. Among the inhabitants were 28 different craftsmen and 4 traders. By 1864, Bolesławice had 172 houses, with inhabitants comprising 18 wealthy individuals, 36 homestead owners, 101 smallholders, 4 weavers, 28 different craftsmen, and 4 traders. In July 1945, a mine explosion occurred at the local manor farm, known as Tillendorf. Six people died, including Bolesław Kubik, the first mayor of Bolesławiec. In 1978, there were 48 agricultural farms here, increasing to 74 in 1988. In 2011, the village had 590 registered residents.

=== Name etymology ===
The name of the village derives from the old Polish male name Bolesław.great glory

== Historical sites ==
According to the register of the National Heritage Board of Poland, the following are included in the list of historic monuments:

- The parish church of St. Mary of the Rosary, dating from the 14th-16th century.
- The church cemetery, dating from the 15th-18th century.
