= Nowa Wieś =

Nowa Wieś (meaning "new village") is a very common place name in Poland. It may refer to:

== In Greater Poland Voivodeship (west-central Poland) ==
- Nowa Wieś, Czarnków-Trzcianka County
- Nowa Wieś, Gmina Rychtal
- Nowa Wieś, Gmina Trzcinica
- Nowa Wieś, Gmina Skulsk
- Nowa Wieś, Koło County
- Nowa Wieś, Gmina Sompolno
- Nowa Wieś, Kościan County
- Nowa Wieś, Krotoszyn County
- Nowa Wieś, Gmina Pleszew
- Nowa Wieś, Gmina Gizałki
- Nowa Wieś, Gmina Słupca
- Nowa Wieś, Gmina Zagórów
- Nowa Wieś, Gmina Kaźmierz
- Nowa Wieś, Gmina Wronki
- Nowa Wieś, Wągrowiec County
- Nowa Wieś, Wolsztyn County

== In Kuyavian-Pomeranian Voivodeship (north-central Poland) ==
- Nowa Wieś, Aleksandrów County
- Nowa Wieś, Brodnica County
- Nowa Wieś, Gmina Ciechocin
- Nowa Wieś, Gmina Golub-Dobrzyń
- Nowa Wieś, Grudziądz County
- Nowa Wieś, Gmina Chrostkowo
- Nowa Wieś, Gmina Wielgie
- Nowa Wieś, Mogilno County
- Nowa Wieś, Radziejów County
- Nowa Wieś, Toruń County
- Nowa Wieś, Gmina Izbica Kujawska
- Nowa Wieś, Gmina Lubień Kujawski
- Nowa Wieś, Gmina Włocławek
- Nowa Wieś, Sępólno County

== In Lesser Poland Voivodeship (south Poland) ==
- Nowa Wieś, a neighbourhood in the Krowodrza district of Kraków
- Nowa Wieś, Kraków County
- Nowa Wieś, Myślenice County
- Nowa Wieś, Nowy Sącz County
- Nowa Wieś, Oświęcim County

== In Łódź Voivodeship (central Poland) ==
- Nowa Wieś, Bełchatów County
- Nowa Wieś, Gmina Kutno
- Nowa Wieś, Gmina Nowe Ostrowy
- Nowa Wieś, Pajęczno County
- Nowa Wieś, Gmina Rozprza
- Nowa Wieś, Gmina Sulejów
- Nowa Wieś, Gmina Poddębice
- Nowa Wieś, Gmina Wartkowice
- Nowa Wieś, Sieradz County
- Nowa Wieś, Wieluń County

== In Lower Silesian Voivodeship (south-west Poland) ==
- Nowa Wieś, Gmina Nowogrodziec
- Nowa Wieś, Gmina Bolesławiec

== In Lublin Voivodeship (east Poland) ==
- Nowa Wieś, Biłgoraj County
- Nowa Wieś, Gmina Tomaszów Lubelski, Tomaszów County
- Nowa Wieś, Gmina Krasnobród, Zamość County
- Nowa Wieś, Gmina Stary Zamość, Zamość County

== In Lubusz Voivodeship (west Poland) ==
- Nowa Wieś, Międzyrzecz County
- Nowa Wieś, Wschowa County

== In Masovian Voivodeship (east-central Poland) ==
- Nowa Wieś, Gmina Ciechanów
- Nowa Wieś, Gmina Ojrzeń
- Nowa Wieś, Gostynin County
- Nowa Wieś, Grójec County
- Nowa Wieś, Kozienice County
- Nowa Wieś, Legionowo County
- Nowa Wieś, Gmina Lipsko
- Nowa Wieś, Gmina Sienno
- Nowa Wieś, Mińsk County
- Nowa Wieś, Mława County
- Nowa Wieś, Gmina Nasielsk, Nowy Dwór County
- Nowa Wieś, Ostrołęka County
- Nowa Wieś, Otwock County
- Nowa Wieś, Piaseczno County
- Nowa Wieś, Gmina Drobin
- Nowa Wieś, Gmina Nowy Duninów
- Nowa Wieś, Gmina Staroźreby
- Nowa Wieś, Pruszków County
- Nowa Wieś, Przasnysz County
- Nowa Wieś, Gmina Młodzieszyn
- Nowa Wieś, Gmina Rybno
- Nowa Wieś, Sokołów County
- Nowa Wieś, Warsaw West County
- Nowa Wieś, Gmina Długosiodło
- Nowa Wieś, Gmina Rząśnik
- Nowa Wieś, Gmina Kuczbork-Osada
- Nowa Wieś, Gmina Siemiątkowo
- Nowa Wieś, Żyrardów County

== In Podlaskie Voivodeship (north-east Poland) ==
- Nowa Wieś, Łomża County
- Nowa Wieś, Mońki County
- Nowa Wieś, Lubartów County
- Nowa Wieś, Sokółka County
- Nowa Wieś, Gmina Bakałarzewo
- Nowa Wieś, Gmina Suwałki

== In Silesian Voivodeship (south Poland) ==
- Nowa Wieś, Będzin County
- Nowa Wieś, Gmina Dąbrowa Zielona
- Nowa Wieś, Gmina Poczesna
- Nowa Wieś, Gliwice County
- Nowa Wieś, Gmina Kłobuck
- Nowa Wieś, Gmina Popów
- Nowa Wieś, Rybnik County

== In Subcarpathian Voivodeship (south-east Poland) ==
- Nowa Wieś, Kolbuszowa County
- Nowa Wieś, Gmina Dukla, Krosno County
- Nowa Wieś, Gmina Nisko
- Nowa Wieś, Gmina Harasiuki
- Nowa Wieś, Przemyśl County
- Nowa Wieś, Rzeszów County
- Nowa Wieś, Strzyżów County

== In Świętokrzyskie Voivodeship (south-central Poland) ==
- Nowa Wieś, Gmina Busko-Zdrój
- Nowa Wieś, Gmina Stopnica
- Nowa Wieś, Gmina Słupia
- Nowa Wieś, Opatów County
- Nowa Wieś, Sandomierz County

== In Warmian-Masurian Voivodeship (north Poland) ==
- Nowa Wieś, Działdowo County
- Nowa Wieś, Elbląg County
- Nowa Wieś, Iława County
- Nowa Wieś, Olsztyn County
- Nowa Wieś, Pisz County

== In West Pomeranian Voivodeship (north-west Poland) ==
- Nowa Wieś, West Pomeranian Voivodeship
