= Gmina Bolesławiec, Lower Silesian Voivodeship =

Gmina Bolesławiec Bolesławiec Commune
- Gmina
- Coat of arms
- Interactive map of Gmina Bolesławiec
- Coordinates (Bolesławiec): 51°16′N 15°34′E
- Country: Poland
- Voivodeship: Lower Silesian
- County: Bolesławiec
- Seat: Bolesławiec
- Sołectwos: Bolesławice, Bożejowice-Rakowice, Brzeźnik, Chościszowice, Dąbrowa Bolesławiecka, Dobra, Golnice, Kozłów, Kraśnik Dolny, Kraśnik Górny, Kraszowice, Krępnica, Kruszyn, Łąka, Łaziska, Lipiany, Mierzwin, Nowa, Nowa Wieś, Nowe Jaroszowice, Ocice, Otok, Parkoszów, Stara Oleszna, Stare Jaroszowice, Suszki, Trzebień, Trzebień Mały, Żeliszów

Area
  - Total: 288.93 km^{2} (111.56 sq mi)

Population (2019-06-30)
  - Total: 14,641
  - Density: 50.673/km^{2} (131.24/sq mi)

Gmina Bolesławiec is a rural gmina (administrative district) in Bolesławiec County, Lower Silesian Voivodeship, in south-western Poland. Its seat is the town of Bolesławiec, although the town is not part of the territory of the gmina.

The gmina covers an area of 288.9 square kilometres (111.5 sq mi), and as of 2019 its total population is 14,641.

== Neighbouring gminas ==
Gmina Bolesławiec is bordered by the town of Bolesławiec and the gminas of Gromadka, Lwówek Śląski, Nowogrodziec, Osiecznica, Szprotawa and Warta Bolesławiecka.

== Villages ==
The gmina contains the villages of Bolesławice, Bożejowice, Brzeźnik, Chościszowice, Dąbrowa Bolesławiecka, Dobra, Godnów, Golnice, Kozłów, Kraśnik Dolny, Kraśnik Górny, Kraszowice, Krępnica, Kruszyn, Łąka, Łaziska, Lipiany, Mierzwin, Nowa, Nowa Wieś, Nowe Jaroszowice, Ocice, Otok, Parkoszów, Rakowice, Stara Oleszna, Stare Jaroszowice, Suszki, Trzebień, Trzebień Mały, and Żeliszów.
