= Gmina Warta Bolesławiecka =

Gmina Warta Bolesławiecka Warta Bolesławiecka Commune
- Gmina
- Flag Coat of arms
- Interactive map of Gmina Warta Bolesławiecka
- Coordinates (Warta Bolesławiecka): 51°13′N 15°40′E
- Country: Poland
- Voivodeship: Lower Silesian
- County: Bolesławiec
- Seat: Warta Bolesławiecka
- Sołectwos: Iwiny, Iwiny-Osiedle, Jurków, Lubków, Raciborowice Dolne, Raciborowice Górne, Szczytnica, Tomaszów Bolesławiecki, Warta Bolesławiecka, Wartowice, Wilczy Las

Area
  - Total: 110.9 km^{2} (42.8 sq mi)

Population (2019-06-30)
  - Total: 8,650
  - Density: 78.0/km^{2} (202/sq mi)
- Website: https://www.wartaboleslawiecka.pl/

Gmina Warta Bolesławiecka is a rural gmina (administrative district) in Bolesławiec County, Lower Silesian Voivodeship, in south-western Poland. Its seat is the village of Warta Bolesławiecka, which lies approximately 9 kilometres (5.6 mi) south-east of Bolesławiec and 97 km (60 mi) west of the regional capital Wrocław.

The gmina covers an area of 110.9 square kilometres (42.8 sq mi), and as of 2019 its total population is 8,650.

== Neighbouring gminas ==
Gmina Warta Bolesławiecka is bordered by the gminas of Bolesławiec, Chojnów, Gromadka, Lwówek Śląski, Pielgrzymka and Zagrodno.

== Villages ==
The gmina contains the villages of Iwiny, Jurków, Lubków, Raciborowice Dolne, Raciborowice Górne, Szczytnica, Tomaszów Bolesławiecki, Warta Bolesławiecka, Wartowice and Wilczy Las.
