= Nowa Wieś, Gmina Bolesławiec =

Nowa Wieś
- Village
- Location within Poland
- Coordinates: 51°19′43″N 15°36′37″E
- Country: Poland
- Voivodeship: Lower Silesian
- County: Bolesławiec
- Gmina: Bolesławiec
- Time zone: UTC+1 (CET)
  - Summer (DST): UTC+2 (CEST)
- Vehicle registration: DBL

Nowa Wieś [ˈnɔva ˈvjɛɕ] is a village in the administrative district of Gmina Bolesławiec, within Bolesławiec County, Lower Silesian Voivodeship, in south-western Poland.

The intersection of Polish A4 and A18 motorways is located nearby, east of the village.
