= Lubków, Bolesławiec County =

Lubków
- Village
- Location within Poland
- Coordinates: 51°14′02″N 15°43′04″E
- Country: Poland
- Voivodeship: Lower Silesian
- County: Bolesławiec
- Gmina: Warta Bolesławiecka

Lubków [ˈlupkuf] is a village in the administrative district of Gmina Warta Bolesławiecka, within Bolesławiec County, Lower Silesian Voivodeship, in south-western Poland.
