= Warta Bolesławiecka =

- Village
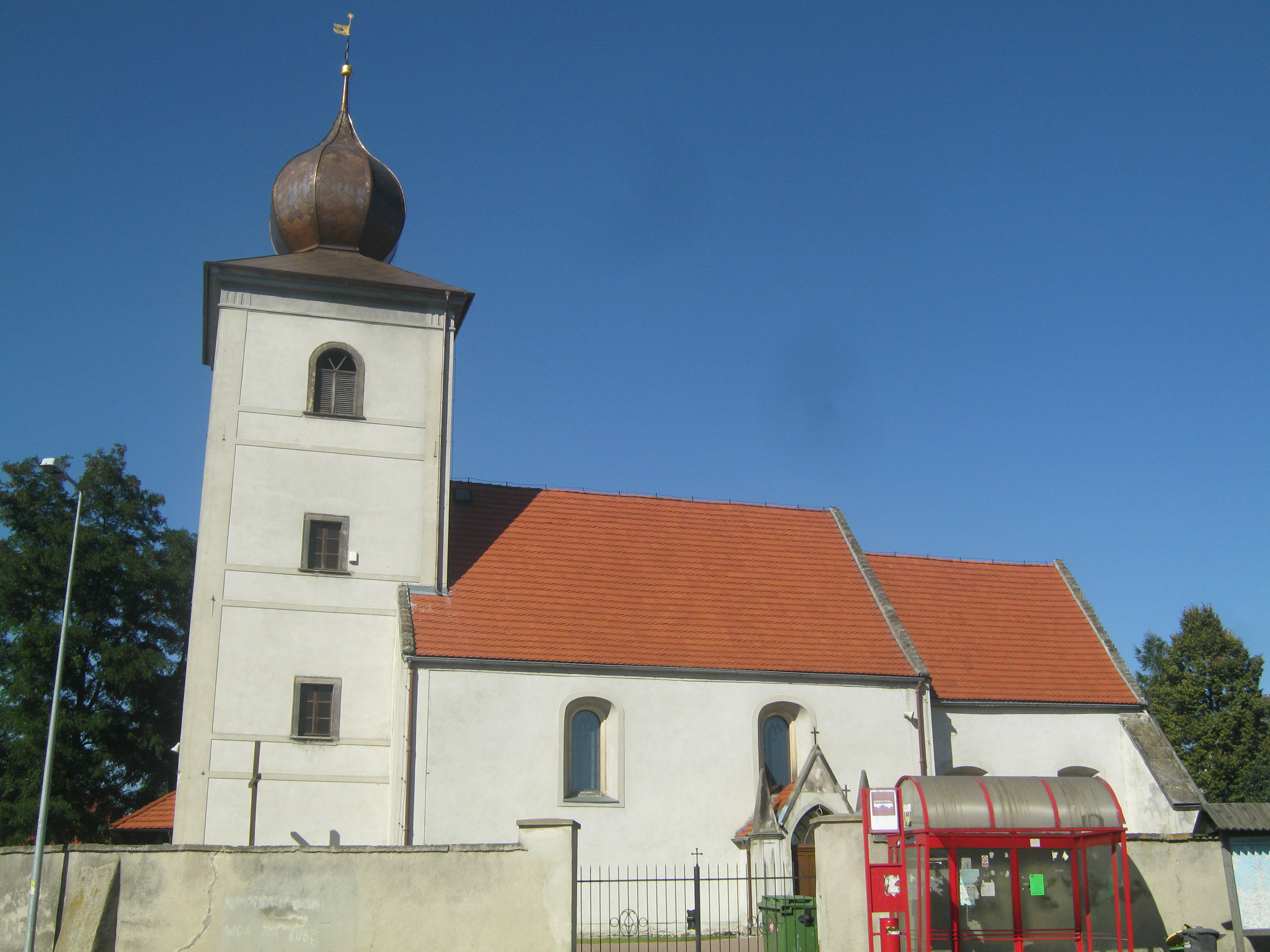
- Parish church

- Location within Poland
- Coordinates: 51°13′N 15°40′E
- Country: Poland
- Voivodeship: Lower Silesian
- County: Bolesławiec
- Gmina: Warta Bolesławiecka
- Time zone: UTC+1 (CET)
  - Summer (DST): UTC+2 (CEST)
- Postal code: 59-720
- Vehicle registration: DBL

Warta Bolesławiecka (Polish: [ˈvarta bɔlɛswaˈvjɛtska]) is a village in Bolesławiec County, Lower Silesian Voivodeship, in south-western Poland. It is the seat of the administrative district (gmina) called Gmina Warta Bolesławiecka.

From 1975 to 1998 the village was in Legnica Voivodeship.
