= Nowa, Lower Silesian Voivodeship =

Nowa
- Village
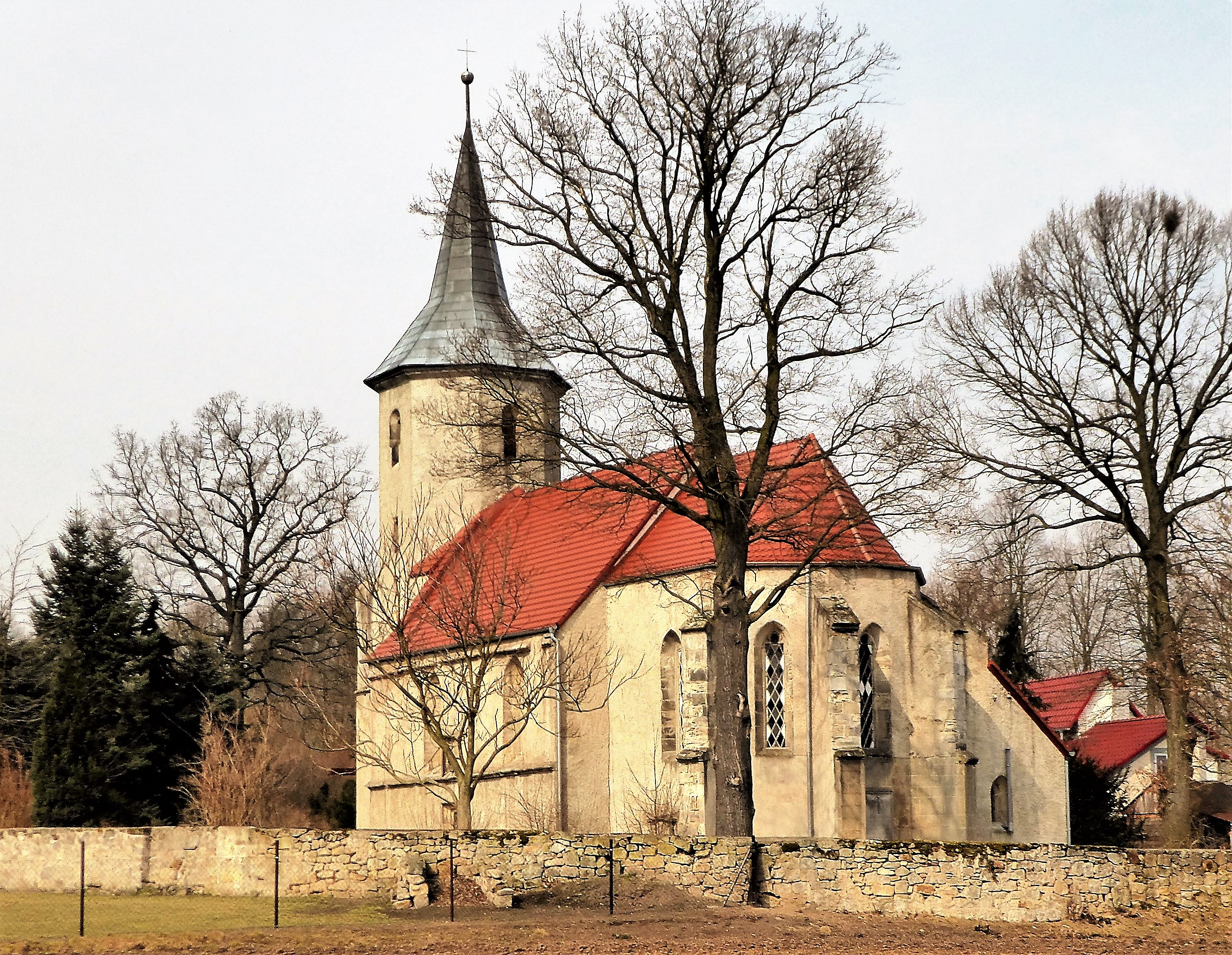
- Church of Our Lady of Sorrows

- Location within Poland
- Coordinates: 51°11′36″N 15°31′29″E
- Country: Poland
- Voivodeship: Lower Silesian
- County: Bolesławiec
- Gmina: Bolesławiec
- Time zone: UTC+1 (CET)
  - Summer (DST): UTC+2 (CEST)
- Vehicle registration: DBL

Nowa [ˈnɔva] is a village in the administrative district of Gmina Bolesławiec, within Bolesławiec County, Lower Silesian Voivodeship, in south-western Poland.
