= Ocice, Lower Silesian Voivodeship =

Ocice
- Village
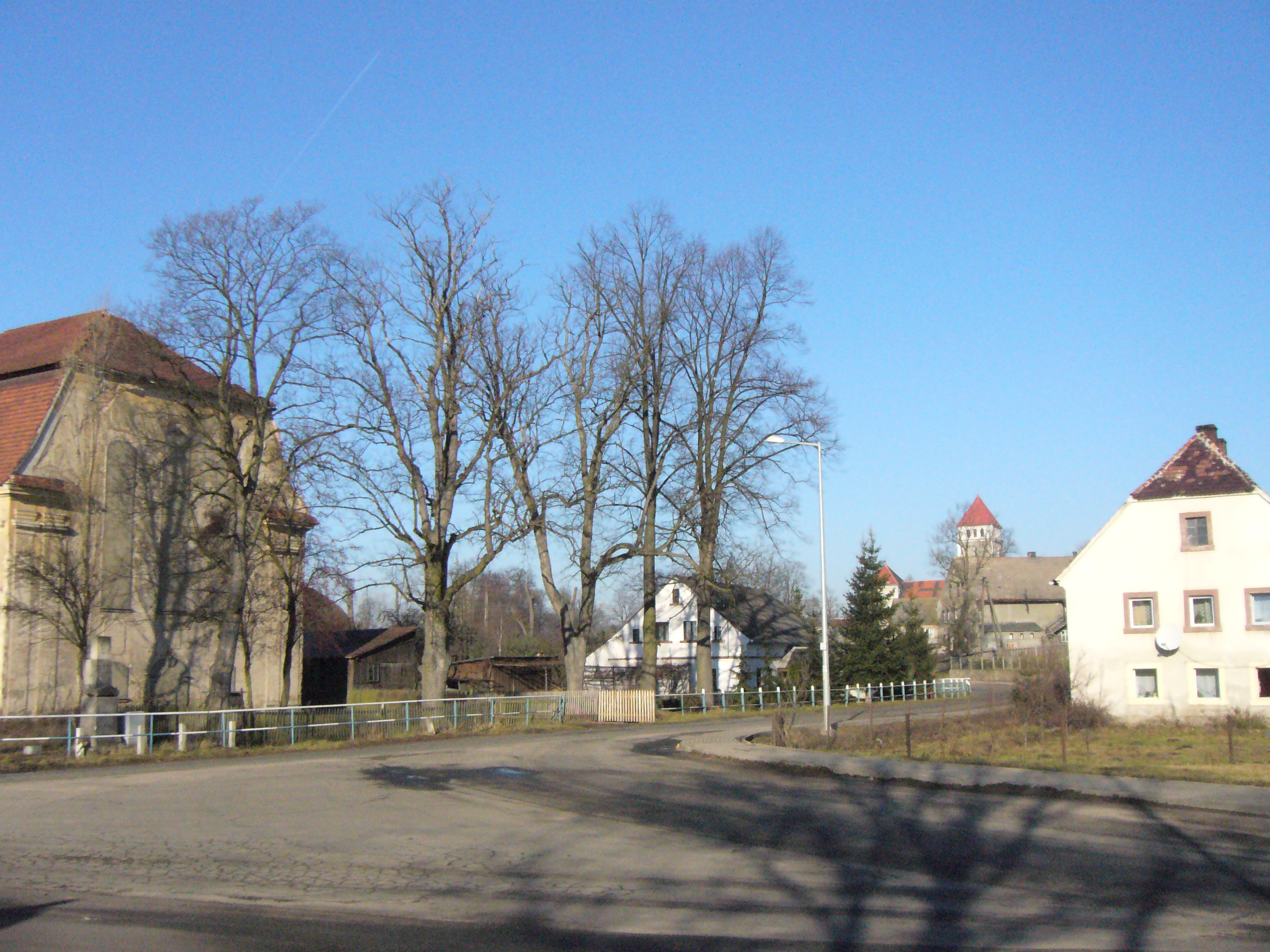

- Location within Poland
- Coordinates: 51°12′08″N 15°29′19″E
- Country: Poland
- Voivodeship: Lower Silesian
- County: Bolesławiec
- Gmina: Bolesławiec
- Population: 800
- Time zone: UTC+1 (CET)
  - Summer (DST): UTC+2 (CEST)
- Postal code: 59-730
- Vehicle registration: DBL

Ocice [ɔˈt͡ɕit͡sɛ] is a village in the administrative district of Gmina Bolesławiec, within Bolesławiec County, Lower Silesian Voivodeship, in south-western Poland.
