= Nowa Wieś, Rybnik County =

Nowa Wieś
- Village
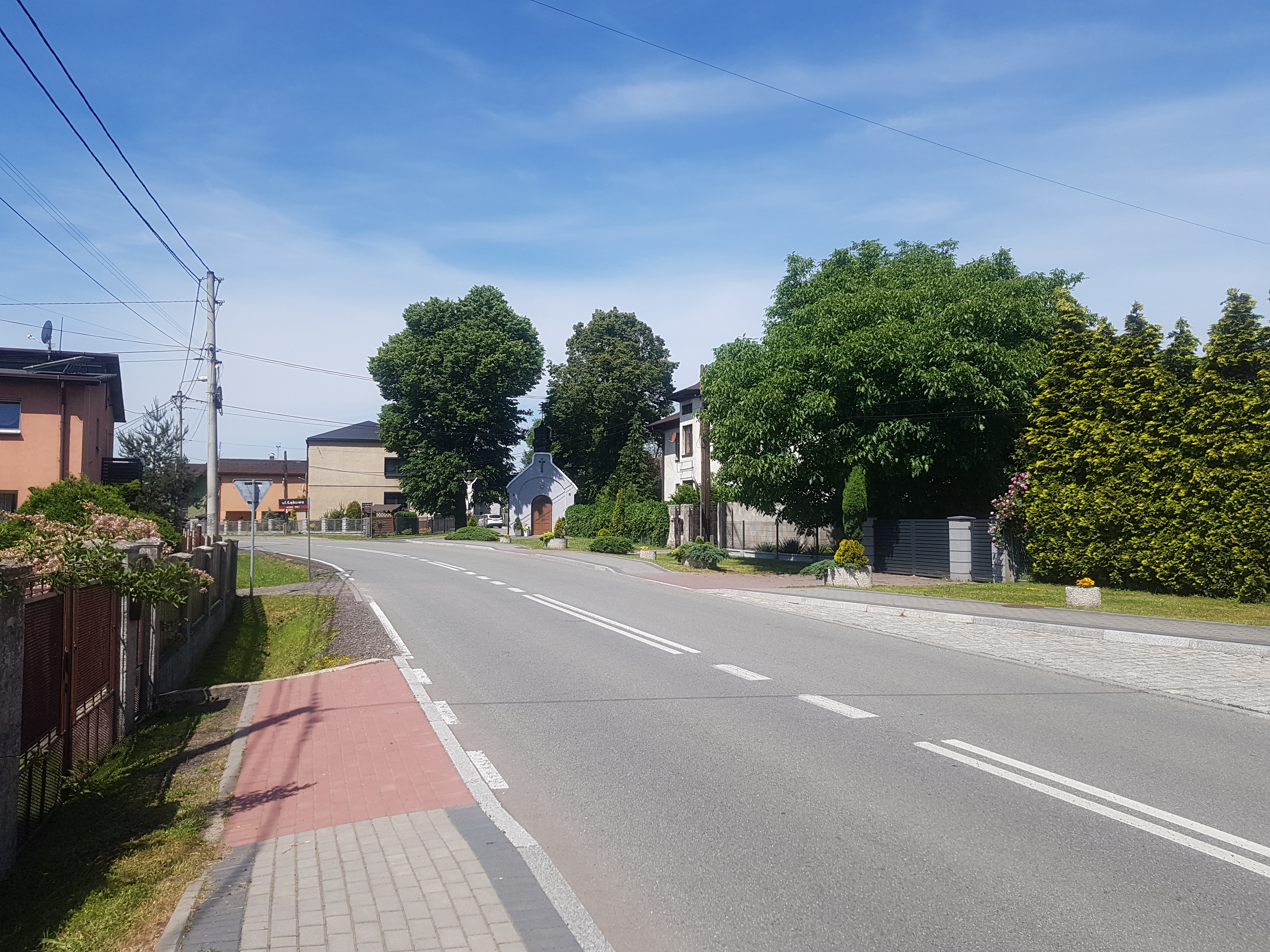

- Location within Poland
- Coordinates: 50°7′2″N 18°21′32″E
- Country: Poland
- Voivodeship: Silesian
- County: Rybnik
- Gmina: Lyski
- Population: 382

Nowa Wieś [ˈnɔva ˈvjɛɕ] is a village in the administrative district of Gmina Lyski, within Rybnik County, Silesian Voivodeship, in southern Poland.
