= Bolesławiec County =

Bolesławiec County Powiat bolesławiecki
- County
- Flag Coat of arms

- Location within the voivodeship
- Coordinates (Bolesławiec): 51°19′N 15°31′E
- Country: Poland
- Voivodeship: Lower Silesian
- Seat: Bolesławiec
- Gminas: Total 6 (incl. 1 urban): Bolesławiec; Gmina Bolesławiec; Gmina Gromadka; Gmina Nowogrodziec; Gmina Osiecznica; Gmina Warta Bolesławiecka

Area
  - Total: 1,303.3 km^{2} (503.2 sq mi)

Population (2019-06-30)
  - Total: 90,108
  - Density: 69.138/km^{2} (179.07/sq mi)
  - Urban: 43,095
  - Rural: 47,013
- Car plates: DBL
- Website: www.powiatboleslawiecki.pl

Bolesławiec County (Polish: powiat bolesławiecki) is a unit of territorial administration and local government (powiat) in Lower Silesian Voivodeship, southwestern Poland. It came into being on January 1, 1999, as a result of the Polish local government reforms passed in 1998. Its administrative seat is the town of Bolesławiec, famed for its pottery, and its only other town is Nowogrodziec. The county covers an area of 1,303.3 square kilometres (503.2 sq mi).

As at 2019 the total population of the county is 90,108, of which the population of Bolesławiec is 38,852, that of Nowogrodziec is 4,243, and the rural population is 47,013.

== Neighbouring counties ==
Bolesławiec County is bordered by Żagań County to the north, Polkowice County to the north-east, Legnica County and Złotoryja County to the east, Lwówek County to the south, Lubań County to the south-west, and Zgorzelec County to the west.

== Administrative divisions ==
The county is subdivided into six gminas (one urban, one urban-rural and four rural). These are listed in the following table, in descending order of population.

Gmina	Type	Area (km^{2})	Population (2019)	Seat
Bolesławiec	urban	23.6	38,852	
Gmina Nowogrodziec	urban-rural	176.3	15,214	Nowogrodziec
Gmina Bolesławiec	rural	288.9	14,641	Bolesławiec*
Gmina Warta Bolesławiecka	rural	110.9	8,650	Warta Bolesławiecka
Gmina Osiecznica	rural	437.1	7,396	Osiecznica
Gmina Gromadka	rural	267.3	5,355	Gromadka
* seat not part of the gmina

== Population ==
=== Cities ===
City	Population (1999)	Population (2000)	Population (2001)	Population (2002)	Population (2003)	Population (2004)	Population (2005)	Population (2006)
Bolesławiec	43 791	43 608	43 523	41 371	41 263	41 117	40 984	40 679
Nowogrodziec	4 070	4 085	4 069	4 110	4 086	4 058	4 056	4 068

=== Gminas ===
Gmina	Type	Population (1999)	Population (2000)	Population (2001)	Population (2002)	Population (2003)	Population (2004)	Population (2005)	Population (2006)
Bolesławiec	rural	11 425	11 558	11 668	12 079	12 164	12 190	12 289	12 542
Gromadka	rural	5 867	5 877	5 821	5 613	5 642	5 613	5 586	5 565
Nowogrodziec	urban-rural	14 793	14 820	14 843	14 689	14 717	14 736	14 729	14 779
Osiecznica	rural	6 365	6 616	6 744	6 895	6 974	7 077	7 064	7 068
Warta Bolesławiecka	rural	7 519	7 546	7 542	7 485	7 548	7 645	7 689	7 868
