= Zagajnik =

Zagajnik may refer to the following places in Poland:

- Zagajnik, Lower Silesian Voivodeship (south-west Poland)
- Zagajnik, Lublin Voivodeship (east Poland)
- Zagajnik railway station, Lower Silesian Voivodeship
