= Jelenia Góra–Żagań railway =

Railway line in Poland

Overview
- Owner: PKP Polskie Linie Kolejowe; Marshal's Office of the Lower Silesian Voivodeship; Polish State Railways
- Line number: 283
- Termini: Jelenia Góra; Żagań

History
- Opened: 1909
- Closed: 1991

Technical
- Line length: 89.196 km (55.424 mi)
- Track gauge: 1,435 mm (4 ft 8 1/2 in)
- Operating speed: 70 km/h (43 mph)
Route map
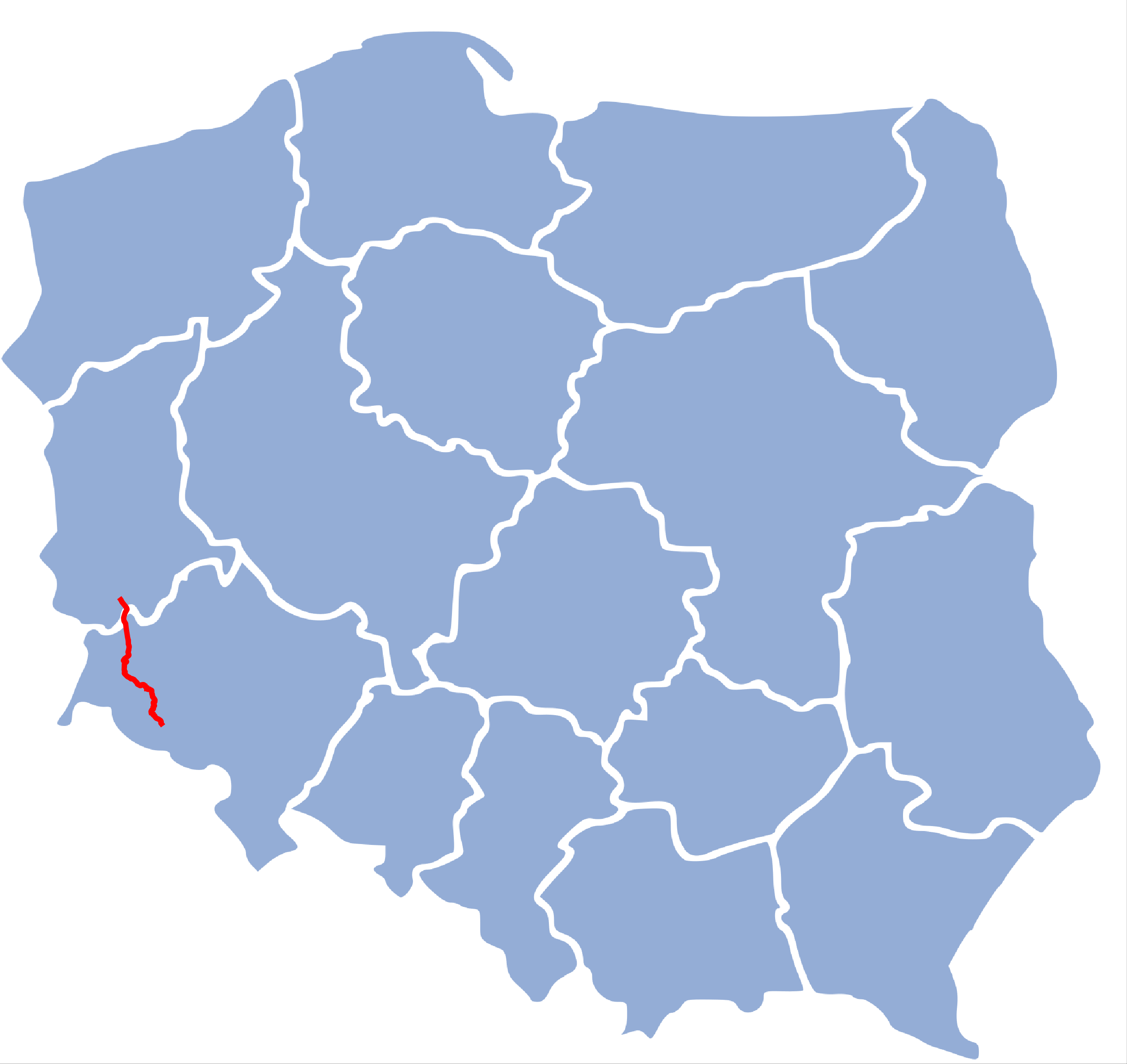

Jelenia Góra–Żagań railway is a single-track, non-electrified line located in southwestern Poland, running from Jelenia Góra to Żagań, via Świętoszów and Zebrzydowa. It is 89.196 km long and traverses the Lower Silesian Voivodeship, specifically in Jelenia Góra and the counties of Karkonosze, Lwówek, and Bolesławiec.

Initially completed in stages from 1904 to 1909, the line included routes such as Jelenia Góra–Lwówek Śląski and Zebrzydowa–Żagań, which became part of the line after World War II. Passenger services between Zebrzydowa and Żagań were suspended in 1991, and in 2004, the section between Ławszowa and Żagań was formally closed.

After a decline in use, between 2014 and 2016, a weekend tourist train named Dolina Bobru briefly operated on the Jelenia Góra–Lwówek Śląski section. Since then, the infrastructure has deteriorated, leading to low operational speeds. In 2019, part of the line near Jelenia Góra was removed to accommodate a new station, Jelenia Góra Zabobrze. The Polish Ministry of Defense announced plans in 2020 to restore the Zebrzydowa–Żagań segment, scheduled for between 2022 and 2026, although this date has ultimately been delayed due to permit issues.

== Course of the line ==
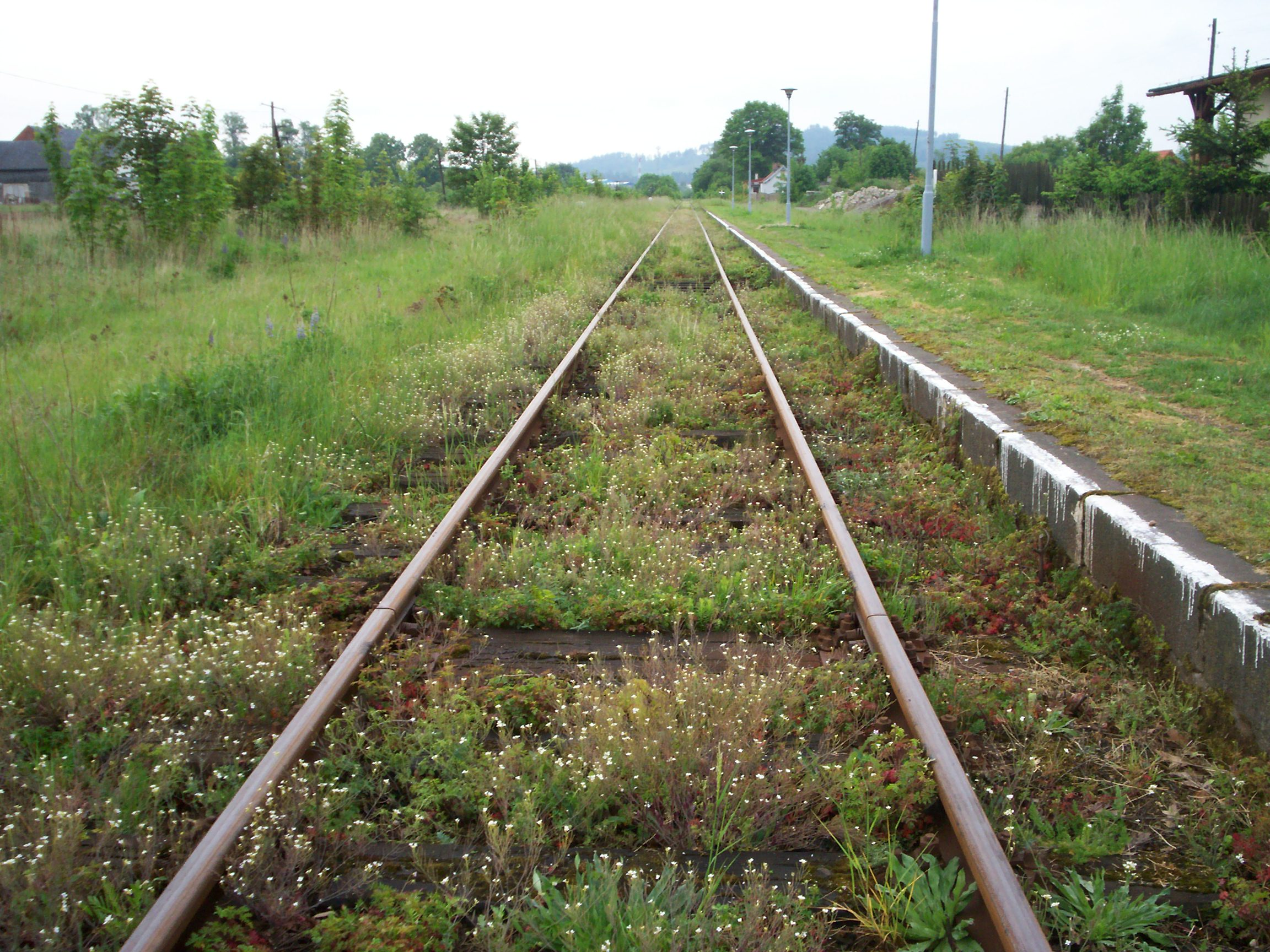
Line at Siedlęcin railway station

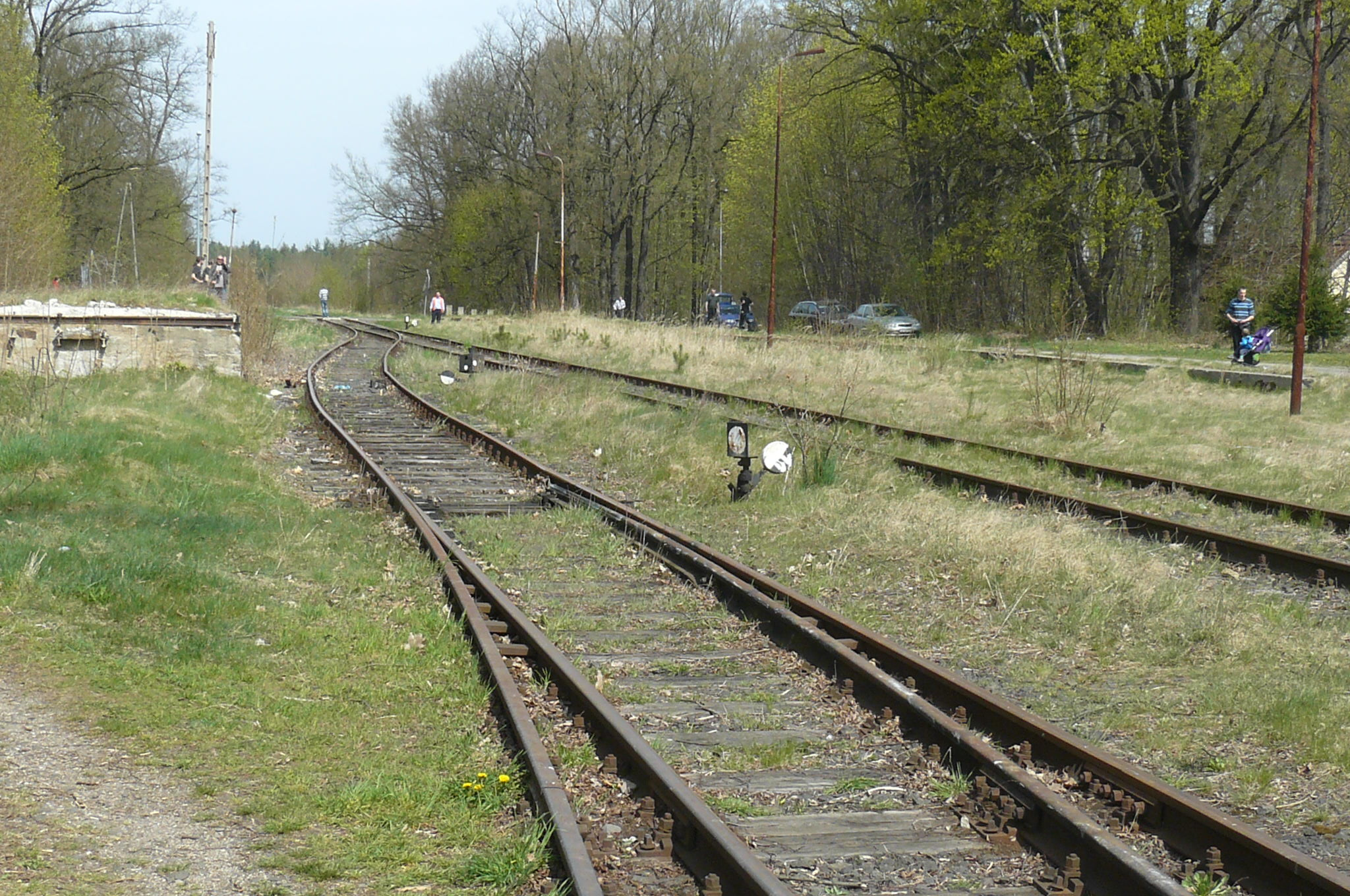
Line at Osiecznica Kliczków loading area

The Jelenia Góra–Żagań railway begins at Jelenia Góra station (km 0.104). Initially, it ran northwest alongside Wrocław Świebodzki–Zgorzelec railway (to Lubań Śląski) and Izera railway (to Szklarska Poręba Górna) on the western track. Currently, from Jelenia Góra, it follows the track of line 311. After crossing the Bóbr river for the first time, it reaches the Jelenia Góra Zabobrze railway station (km 0.969), where it veers left to the north, passing under the E65 (national road 3) and connecting to a branch line for a local power plant. The line then turns right, passing beneath other railway lines and climbs northward to reach its highest point (343 m above sea level) near the Jeżów Sudecki railway station (km 3.519).

After Jeżów Sudecki, the line shifts northwest, passing through a lowland area and approaching the Siedlęcin railway station (km 7.321) in the village's western part. Past Siedlęcin, it crosses more varied terrain, reaching Lake Pilchowickie and following its southern shore northwest. About 11.2 km from Jelenia Góra, it reaches Pilchowice Zapora railway station. The elevation difference between Jelenia Góra and Pilchowice Zapora is 52 meters, with an average gradient of 4.6‰.

Leaving Pilchowice Zapora, the line enters a tunnel under Czyżyk and continues along the Bóbr’s right bank before crossing the Strzyżówka valley and the road between Jelenia Góra and Wleń. It then passes through a tunnel under Dwory mountain to Pilchowice Nielestno railway station (km 14.815). After Pilchowice Nielestno, it crosses the Bóbr again, running along its western bank northward, then entering the longest tunnel on the route under Zamkowa mountain. The line emerges at Wleń railway station (km 18.004, 230 m above sea level), where the gradient between Pilchowice Zapora and Wleń is 9.0‰.

Beyond Wleń, the line crosses a road at grade and continues north along the Bóbr, passing the Marczów and Dębowy Gaj railway stations before reaching Lwówek Śląski (km 32.636). Between Wleń and Lwówek Śląski, the elevation decreases by 19 m with an average gradient of 1.3‰.

After Lwówek Śląski, the line heads northwest, then turns west at Rakowice Wielkie railway station, and shifts southwest at Radłówka railway station, moving away from the Bóbr river. At Nowogrodziec railway station (km 51.618), it crosses the Kwisa river, changing direction northward. Near the village of Zebrzydowa, it crosses national road No. 94 and, just before Zebrzydowa railway station, provincial road No. 357, also connecting with Miłkowice–Żary railway. The section between Lwówek Śląski and Zebrzydowa railway station (km 61.030) spans 28.394 km, with a 22-meter elevation change.

Beyond Zebrzydowa, the line follows Miłkowice–Żary railway for around 800 meters before turning northward toward Ławszowa railway station, paralleling the Kwisa river along its western side through forested terrain. The route passes three signal stations (Tomisław, Osiecznica Kliczków, and Przejęsław) and crosses the A4 highway. Between Ławszowa (km 77.526) and Zebrzydowa, the distance is 16.496 km, with a 22-meter elevation difference and an average gradient of 1.3‰.

Previously, the line extended north along the Kwisa, where it joined Łódź–Tuplice railway at Żagań. Between the former Ławszowa railway station and Żagań (km 104.730), the distance was 27.204 km, with a 53-meter elevation change and a gradient of 1.9‰.

== History ==
=== Origins and construction ===
Before the line connecting Jelenia Góra with Lwówek Śląski and onward to Żagań was established, the three stations already functioned within the Lower Silesian railway system. Jelenia Góra, until 1906, had a connection to Zgorzelec and Wałbrzych (the Silesian Mountain Railway), constructed between 1866 and 1867, as well as to Kowary (opened in 1882) and Piechowice (1891). Lwówek Śląski, in addition to the 1904 route from Zebrzydowa, had a connection to Gryfów Śląski, opened on 15 October 1885, which was extended 10 years later from Lwówek Śląski to Nowa Wieś Grodziska and further to Złotoryja.

Much earlier, in the 1840s and 1870s, a junction was developed in Żagań. The route connecting the stations Jankowa Żagańska and Głogów via Żagań was launched on 1 October 1846, and on 31 December 1871, Żagań gained a connection to Żary, extended the following year toward Germany. Four years later, from 1875, thanks to the opening of the 15 March section Jasień–Miłkowice, trains on the Wrocław–Berlin route began passing through Żagań.

The origins of the current Jelenia Góra–Żagań railway trace back to the 1880s, when a connection along the Bóbr Valley was being designed to link Jelenia Góra with Bolesławiec through Lwówek Śląski. The line's construction began in stages in the early 20th century from Zebrzydowa in both directions. The routes toward Żagań were launched as follows:

- Zebrzydowa–Ławszowa, 25 November 1902
- Ławszowa–Świętoszów, 1 November 1904
- Świętoszów–Żagań, 1 August 1905

The section toward Lwówek Śląski was put into operation on 20 July 1904, allowing Lwówek Śląski and Nowogrodziec easy access to the main railway line connecting Wrocław with Dresden and Berlin (the current E 30 railway line). This was one of the main reasons for constructing the route, and its completion also contributed to the economic revitalization of the surrounding areas.

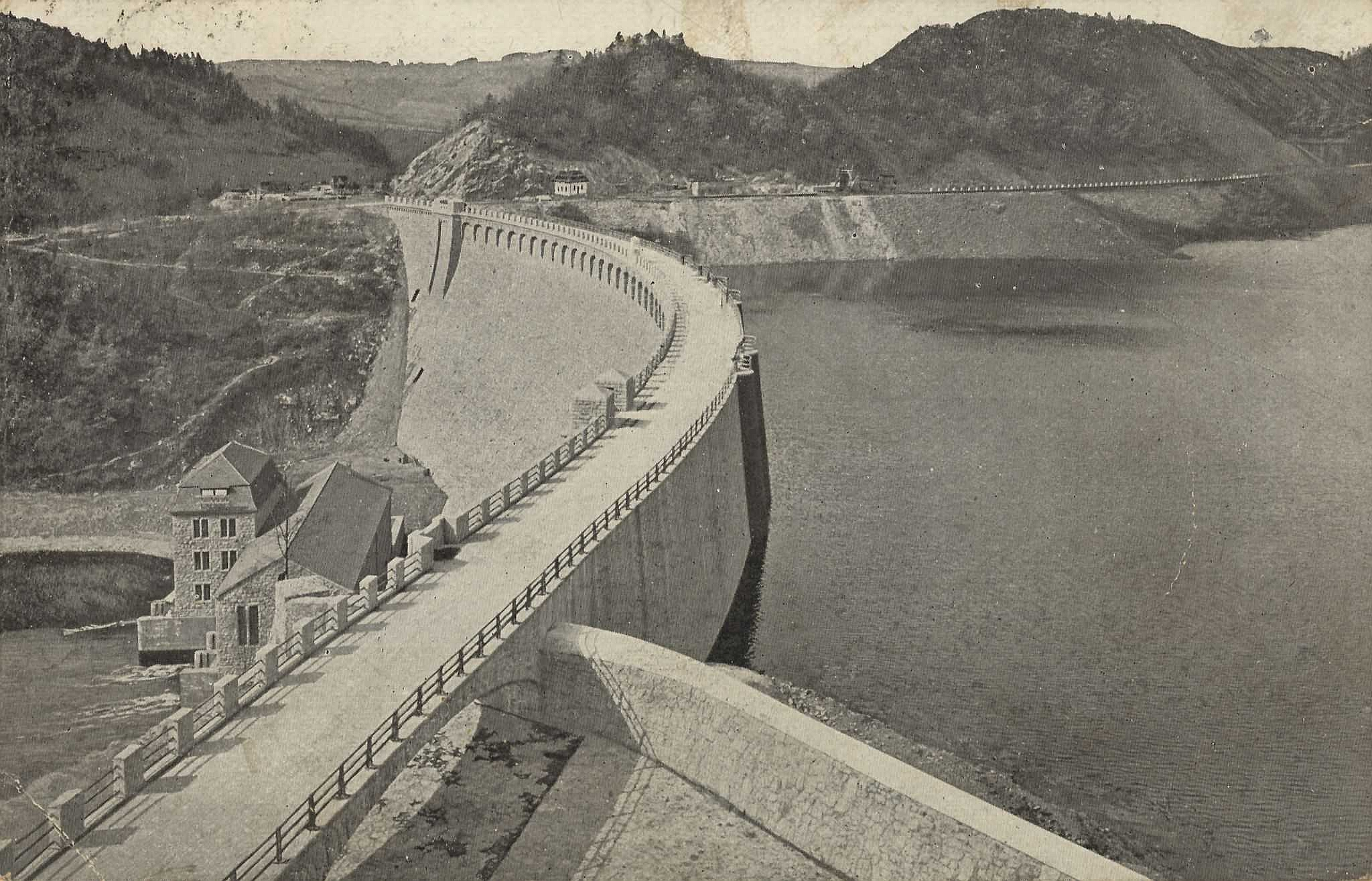
Pilchowice Dam in 1925 – its construction was one of the main reasons for the creation of the Jelenia Góra–Lwówek Śląski railway line

The idea of a railway line between Jelenia Góra and Lwówek Śląski appeared as early as the 1880s. In addition, enterprises located along the planned route, particularly factories in Siedlęcin, Wrzeszczyn, Pilchowice, and the quarry in Nielestno, were interested in the railway's construction. Ultimately, the need for the railway line from Jelenia Góra to Lwówek Śląski was primarily driven by the construction of a dam in Pilchowice, which required the transport of large quantities of building materials, for which railways were considered the most effective solution. After the dam and railway line were completed, the route was expected to generate income from the transport of coal (from the Wałbrzych area) and local materials, especially wood and sandstone from the Lwówek Śląski region. Additionally, the line was intended to activate the economic development of the Lwówek region, including promoting tourism by providing easier access to tourist destinations like Wleń and Lwówek Śląski, as well as other landmarks.

In 1900, the first design works for the Pilchowice reservoir began, and two years later, the construction of the railway line started. The construction faced many difficulties due to the highly varied terrain, which required the creation of numerous engineering structures. The construction proceeded from two directions – from Lwówek Śląski and Jelenia Góra. The first phase focused on building the connection to Pilchowice, driven by the need to supply materials for the dam's construction. A third rail was laid to facilitate the transport of materials to the construction site using narrow-gauge trains. Experienced Italian and Polish workers were brought in for the construction. The section from Jelenia Góra to Pilchowice was completed on 1 October 1906. The next section, Lwówek Śląski–Wleń, was the easiest to build technically, as it followed the left bank of the wide Bóbr Valley, requiring fewer large engineering works. This section was opened on 1 July 1909. The Pilchowice–Wleń section was the most complicated, requiring the construction of tunnels under the Czyżyk and Dwory hills near Pilchowice and under Góra Zamkowa in Wleń, as well as a stone viaduct over the Strzyżówka Valley in Pilchowice. This section was completed nearly two months after the opening of the Wleń–Lwówek Śląski section, on 28 August 1909.

The construction costs were very high, with the cost of building the Jelenia Góra–Wleń section, calculated per kilometer, being approximately 250,000 marks, while the average cost of building a railway line in the German Empire at that time was 120,000 marks.

By the end of World War II, all the tunnel entrances were blown up by SS partisans, as well as the bridge piers over Pilchowickie Lake.

=== Post-war period ===
After World War II, following the change in national borders, the railway line was taken over by Polish State Railways. After the damage done during the war, the line was quickly restored to operational status on 10 November 1946. A ceremonial reopening took place at stations, including in Wleń. For another five years, this line remained the only railway connection from Jelenia Góra to the north and west, which meant that, in addition to passenger trains, several long-distance trains operated on this route.

The passenger service on the line remained steady until the 1980s, when the gradual decline of the railway network began. In January 1983, passenger trains were suspended on the Lwówek Śląski–Gryfów Śląski section, and in 1991 on the Lwówek Śląski–Jerzmanice Zdrój route. That same year, passenger services were suspended between Zebrzydowa and Żagań, and on 20 October 1994, the Ławszowa–Żagań section was completely closed. In early 1996, passenger services between Lwówek Śląski and Zebrzydowa were suspended. The services were steadily reduced by Polish State Railways until July 2005, when trains were replaced by the Railway Bus Communication system, with the threat of complete closure for passenger traffic. However, due to efforts from local government authorities, the line was not closed, and promotion of the route, particularly for tourism, was pursued. In December 2007, the Lwówek Śląski–Zebrzydowa connection was revived, and in 2008, the line was included in the Euro-Nysa all-day ticket offer. Special promotional trains were also introduced, notably on Children’s Day, with a historic train powered by a steam locomotive.

Passenger services continued until 11 December 2016, when Lower Silesian Railways launched the last train from Jelenia Góra to Lwówek Śląski and Wrocław Główny, named the "Last Lazy Train". On the same day, bus replacement services were introduced for the Jelenia Góra–Lwówek Śląski section. The closure of passenger services was justified by the deteriorating technical condition of the railway line, which led to longer travel times for passenger trains. According to data from early 2017, as much as 74% of the railway’s length was in poor condition. To improve the line’s condition, PKP Polskie Linie Kolejowe sought financial support from the Lower Silesian Marshal's Office for maintenance and repair works worth 4.6 million PLN in 2014, but the regional authorities deemed the cost disproportionate to the expected benefits.

Between the end of World War II and the cessation of passenger traffic in 2016, four major railway accidents occurred on the line. The most serious was in the 1970s when a head-on collision between two freight trains occurred at night, killing two drivers. The accident happened on the Nowogrodziec–Niwnice route when a drunk signalman allowed both locomotives to enter the same track. On 3 August 1977, two trains collided at the exit of the tunnel in Wleń, injuring 20 people. On 20 March 1984, a boiler explosion occurred in a Ty2 steam locomotive near Marczów, killing two people and injuring the train conductor. On 15 April 2008, a tanker carrying ammonia water overturned near Marczów.

In mid-March 2017, reports emerged that the Wleń and Association of Local Railway Transport Services were interested in reintroducing train services between Jelenia Góra and Lwówek Śląski.

This line was also included in the government’s "Kolej Plus" program announced on 17 October 2018, which aimed to create a Legnica–Złotoryja–Jelenia Góra/Świeradów-Zdrój route, along with the revitalization of the Lwówek Śląski–Zebrzydowa section. In January the following year, the Ministry of National Defense announced plans to renovate the railway line between Żagań and Zebrzydowa by 2023 to accommodate train speeds of up to 80 km/h, including the reconstruction of the closed Ławszowa–Żagań section. The revival of passenger infrastructure was also being considered.

On 5 February 2019, the Lower Silesian Regional Authority approved a resolution for the transfer of the perpetual usufruct rights of the land and ownership of buildings and facilities related to the Jelenia Góra–Żagań railway between Jelenia Góra and Lwówek Śląski from Polish State Railways.

In 2023, an agreement was reached between the regional government and PKP Polskie Linie Kolejowe, under which the section of the line from Jelenia Góra to Lwówek Śląski, unused since 2016, would be transferred to the regional government for 30 years of free use.

== Infrastructure ==
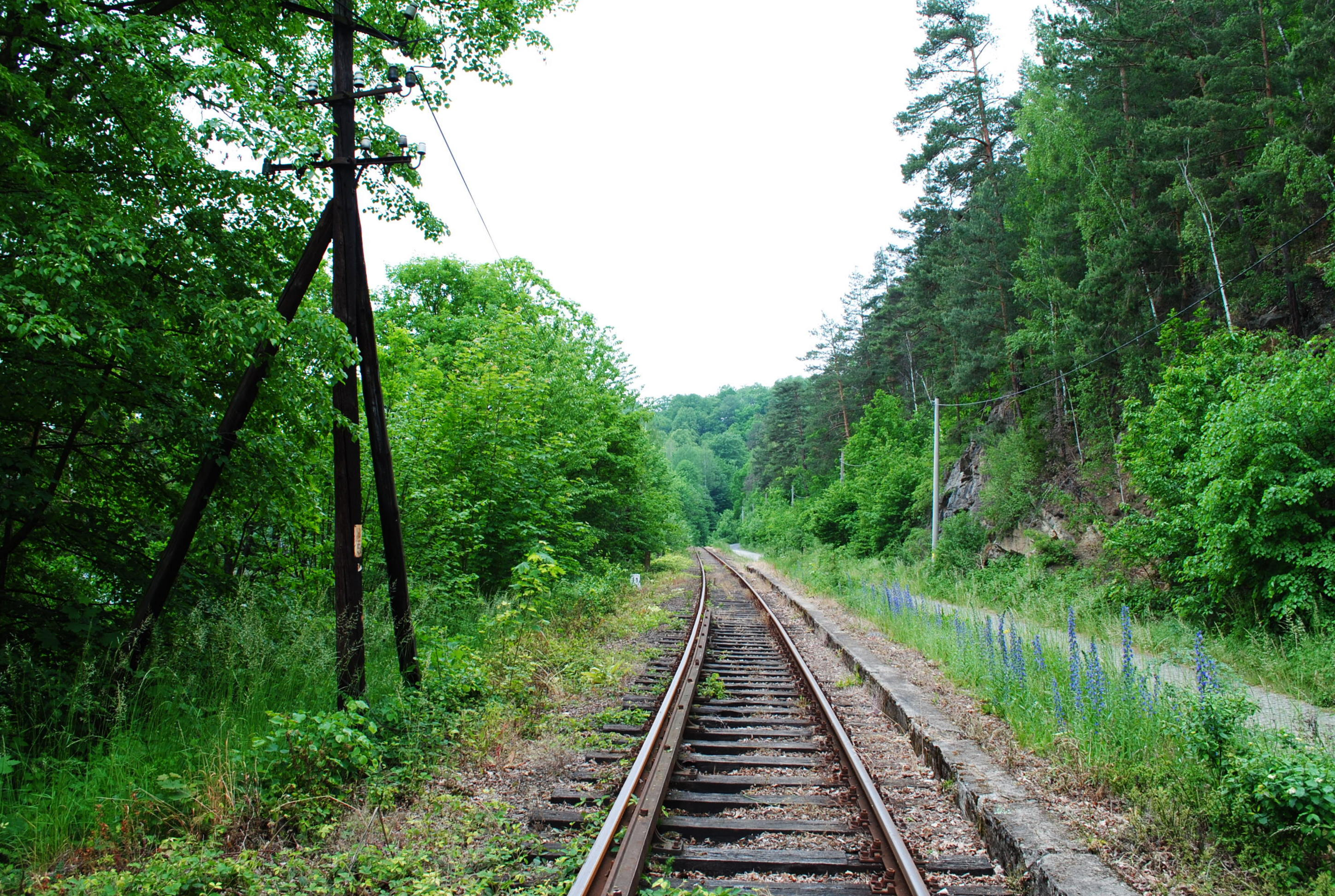
Line beyond Pilchowice Zapora railway station (view toward Lwówek Śląski)

Jelenia Góra–Żagań railway, managed by PKP Polskie Linie Kolejowe, totals 89.196 km (as of 8 September 2023). It falls under the jurisdiction of two railway line divisions – section Jelenia Góra–Zebrzydowa (excluding the final station, km 0.070 – 59.000) under the Wałbrzych division, and the route Zebrzydowa–Świętoszów (km 59.000 – 89.196) under the Wrocław division. Aside from the Jelenia Góra station and Zebrzydowa junction, where it intersects with double-track, electrified railway lines, the line is entirely single-track and non-electrified. It is equipped with automatic train –ing electromagnets on the Jelenia Góra–Zebrzydowa section (no system from km 59.000 to 77.621).

List of maximum speeds (km/h)
line section		track 1		
km start	km end	passenger trains	rail buses	freight trains
0.104	0.330	40		
0.330	36.300	0		
36.300	40.300	70		60
40.300	41.423	20		
41.423	59.000	60		50
59.000	61.100	40		
61.100	72.000	20		
72.000	89.300	0		
includes restrictions from the Permanent Warning Register status as of 31 December 2022

=== Technical condition of the line ===
As of early 2017, 17% of Jelenia Góra–Żagań railway was in good condition, 9% in fair condition, and 74% in poor condition. According to estimates by the Ministry of Infrastructure and Construction from March 2017, restoring the line to optimal technical condition on the Jelenia Góra–Lwówek Śląski section (i.e., achieving train speeds between 40 and 60 km/h) would cost approximately 80 million PLN, excluding work on engineering structures. Building a new railway line along the existing route would raise this cost to between 300 and 400 million PLN.

=== Branch lines ===
Station	Line	Direction	Status
Jelenia Góra	274	Wrocław Świebodzki	Active
Jelenia Góra	274	Zgorzelec	Active
Lwówek Śląski	284	Legnica	Inactive
Lwówek Śląski	284	Pobiedna	Inactive
Zebrzydowa	282	Miłkowice	Active
Zebrzydowa	282	Żary	Active
Żagań	275	Wrocław Muchobór	Discontinued
Żagań	275	Guben	Discontinued

=== Operational points ===
On the active section of Jelenia Góra–Żagań railway, there are 20 traffic and dispatching posts, including 5 railway stations (Jelenia Góra, Wleń, Lwówek Śląski, Niwnice, and Zebrzydowa) and 4 freight and passenger stops (Pilchowice Nielestno, Nowogrodziec, Osiecznica Kliczków, and Ławszowa). The average distance between these points is 4.0 km. They feature extensive infrastructure for both passenger and freight traffic, which varies in usage. Most sites have train stations and warehouses, although only the stations and the Osiecznica Kliczków loading point have more than one active platform. A ticket office and waiting room are available only at the starting station in Jelenia Góra.

The construction of stations and stops largely coincided with the building of the railway line itself. The facilities of the Bóbr Valley Railway, excluding the previously established Jelenia Góra and Lwówek Śląski stations, were relatively small and intended for passenger services, freight dispatch, train crossings, and wagon loading. Station layouts (except for Pilchowice Zapora stop) were similar, typically comprising a train station, adjoining warehouse, restroom, service buildings, and sometimes a residential building. The architectural style of the stations was influenced primarily by the architectural trends of the early 20th century and the tourist character of the Bóbr Valley around Wleń and Lwówek Śląski.

Below is a list of all operational points (including decommissioned ones) along the former route of Jelenia Góra–Żagań railway:

Name	Km axis	Elevation [m above sea level]	Number of platform edges	Infrastructure	Former names	Picture
Jelenia Góra–Ławszowa section (0.070–77.621 km)
Jelenia Góra	0.070	343	8	train station (waiting room, ticket office); freight warehouse; carriage house; 2 water towers; loading areas; signal boxes	Hirschberg (Schlesien); Hirschberg (Schlesien) Hbf; Hirschberg (Riesengebirge) Hbf; Hirschberg Hbf	
Jelenia Góra Zabobrze	0.969	342	1	shelter; controlled branch post from Jelenia Góra	–	–
Jelenia Góra PEC (side track)	1.866	342	–	siding; protective stub track	–	–
Jeżów Sudecki	3.519	341	1	train station; warehouse; restroom; loading area	Grunau (Riesengebirge); Gronowiec; Jeżów Śląski	
Siedlęcin	7.321	331	1	train station; warehouse; residential building; restroom; loading area	Boberröhrsdorf; Bobrowice	
Pilchowice Zapora	11.168	291	1	waiting room; residential building	Talsperre; Bobrzyck	
Pilchowice Nielestno (freight and passenger stop)	14.815	240	1	train station; warehouse; loading area	Mauer-Waltersdorf; Nielestno	
Pilchowice Nielestno; Towarowe (freight siding, decommissioned)	15.560	235	–	–	–	–
Wleń	18.004	230	2	train station; signal box; warehouse; restroom; loading area; side ramp	Lähn	
Marczów	22.930	224	1	train station; signal box; restroom; loading area	Märzdorf am Bober; Märzdorf (Kr. Löwenberg); Marczew	
Dębowy Gaj	26.633	215	1	train station; warehouse; restroom; loading area; side ramp	Siebeneichen; Dąbkowiec	
Lwówek Śląski	32.636	211	4	train station; warehouse; restroom; service building; loading area; side ramp; locomotive depot; 2 water towers; signal box	Löwenberg; Lwówek nad Bobrem	
Rakowice Wielkie	35.711	216	1	ruined buildings	Groß Rackwitz; Rakowice Śląskie	–
Rakowice Żwirownia (freight siding, decommissioned)	36.320	216	–	–	–	–
Radłówka (decommissioned)	37.735	226	0	–	Hartelangenvorwerk	–
Niwnice	41.230	238	2	train station; warehouse; signal box; side ramp	Neuland; Nowienice	–
Gościszów	45.910; 48.347	215	1	train station; residential building; warehouse	Gießmannsdorf (Kr. Bunzlau); Goświn	
Cegielnia Gościszów I (freight siding, decommissioned)	48.200	215	1	–	–	–
Gościszów Dolny (freight and passenger stop, decommissioned)	48.277	217	0	–	Nieder Gießmannsdorf; Goświn Dolny	–
Cegielnia Gościszów II (freight siding, decommissioned)	48.500	217	–	–	–	–
Kolonia-Nowogrodziec (freight siding, decommissioned)	50.229	–	–	–	–	–
Nowogrodziec (freight and passenger stop)	51.618	208	2	train station; warehouse; signal box; restroom; service building; loading area; side ramp	Naumburg (Queis); Nowogród nad Gwizdem	
Nowogrodziec Surmin (freight siding)	53.315	204	–	–	–	–
Ołdrzychów (freight and passenger stop, decommissioned)	53.316	204	0	–	Ullersdorf (Queis); Ullersdorf (Riesengebirge); Ullersdorf (Queis)	–
Zebrzydowa Wieś (decommissioned)	56.397	197	0	–	Ober-Siegersdorf; Siegersdorf Ort; Zabłock	–
Zebrzydowa	61.030	189	2	train station; warehouse; signal box; restroom; service building; loading area; side ramp; water tower	Siegersdorf; Zabłocie	
Tomisław	67.134	193	1	residential building; loading area	Thommendorf	
Osiecznica Kliczków (freight and passenger stop)	71.549	190	2	train station; warehouse; signal box; restroom; service building; loading area; side ramp	Wehrau-Klitschdorf; Wierów	
Przejęsław (freight siding)	75.759	171	1	–	Prinzdorf	–
Tartak Przejęsław (freight siding, decommissioned)	75.810	171	–	–	–	–
Ławszowa (freight and passenger stop)	77.526	167	1	train station; warehouse; restroom; service building; loading area; side ramp; water tower	Lorenzdorf 1902-1945; Wawer nad Gwizdem	–
Ławszowa–Żagań section (77.621–104.730 km)
Luboszów (freight and passenger stop, decommissioned)	82.206	153	0	–	Lipschau; Lipiszk	–
Luboszów Przystanek (decommissioned)	84.876	145	0	–	Dohms; Domusz	–
Świętoszów (decommissioned)	87.237	137	1	train station; warehouse; signal box; service building; loading area; side ramp; water tower	Neuhammer (Queis); Radzińsk; Kuźnica Nowa	
Łozy (decommissioned)	90.010	131	1	–	Loos; Łaz	
Dobre nad Kwisą (decommissioned)	94.410	125	1	–	Dober; Dobra nad Gwizdem	–
Trzebów (decommissioned)	96.492	121	1	–	Tschiebsdorf; Trzebieszów nad Gwizdem	–
509 Żwirownia Trzebów (freight siding, decommissioned)	97.792	121	–	–	–	–
Żagań	104.730	114	10	train station (ticket office, waiting room); warehouse; water tower; signal box; service building; loading area; side ramp; water tower; former locomotive depot	Sagan; Żegań	

=== Bridges and viaducts ===
The most technically varied section of Jelenia Góra–Żagań railway is the route of the former Bóbr Valley Railway (the section from Jelenia Góra to Lwówek Śląski), particularly between Siedlęcin and Wleń, where two steel bridges, two railway viaducts, and three tunnels were built. In the 1930s, reinforced concrete road viaducts were added above the railway line in Jeżów Sudecki and Siedlęcin.

Type	Section of line	Years of construction	Km of line	Length [m]	Height [m]	Number of spans	Description	Picture
railway bridge over Pilchowice Lake	Siedlęcin – Pilchowice Zapora	1905–1906	10.665	131.7	43.0	3	Truss bridge with a lower truss, riveted, supported on two stone granite pillars; one of the highest railway bridges in Poland	
railway viaduct over the road and Strzyżówka stream	Pilchowice Zapora – Pilchowice Nielestno	1906–1909	13.575	50.0	12.5	4	Vaulted viaduct supported on three stone pillars and abutments made of light sandstone, styled as a defensive structure; the track on the viaduct is secured with metal barriers	–
railway bridge over the Bóbr river	Pilchowice Nielestno – Wleń	1905–1906	14.940	–	–	4	Truss bridge	
Railway bridge over the Kwisa river	Nowogrodziec – Ołdrzychów	1903	–	–	–	–	Truss bridge with a lower truss and a single stone pillar	–

=== Tunnels ===
Due to the varied terrain on the section Jelenia Góra–Lwówek Śląski, between the stations Pilchowice Zapora and Wleń, it was necessary to make three tunnels. The first two were built using the mining method by creating two parallel tunnels, which allowed for a shorter construction time. The third, the longest tunnel before Wleń, was built using the chamber method, by constructing the upper part of the tunnel and then deepening it to the track bed level. The original stone tunnel portals were built in the style of defensive structures. They were blown up by retreating German troops on 8 May 1945 and rebuilt in 1946 with reinforced concrete lining. A list of tunnels on this section of the railway line is presented in the table below:

Type/location	Section of line	Year of construction	Km of line	Length [m]	Technical parameters
Tunnel under Czyżyk	Pilchowice Zapora – Pilchowice Nielestno	1906–1907	11.610–11.798	187	Arch tunnel, single-track, single-chamber
Tunnel under Dwory Mountain	Pilchowice Zapora – Pilchowice Nielestno	1906–1909	13.723–13.877	154	Arch tunnel, single-track, single-chamber
Tunnel under Zamkowa Mountain (Lennogóra)	Pilchowice Nielestno – Wleń	1906–1907	17.380–17.800	320	Arch tunnel, single-track, single-chamber

== Train traffic ==
=== Passenger transport and connections ===
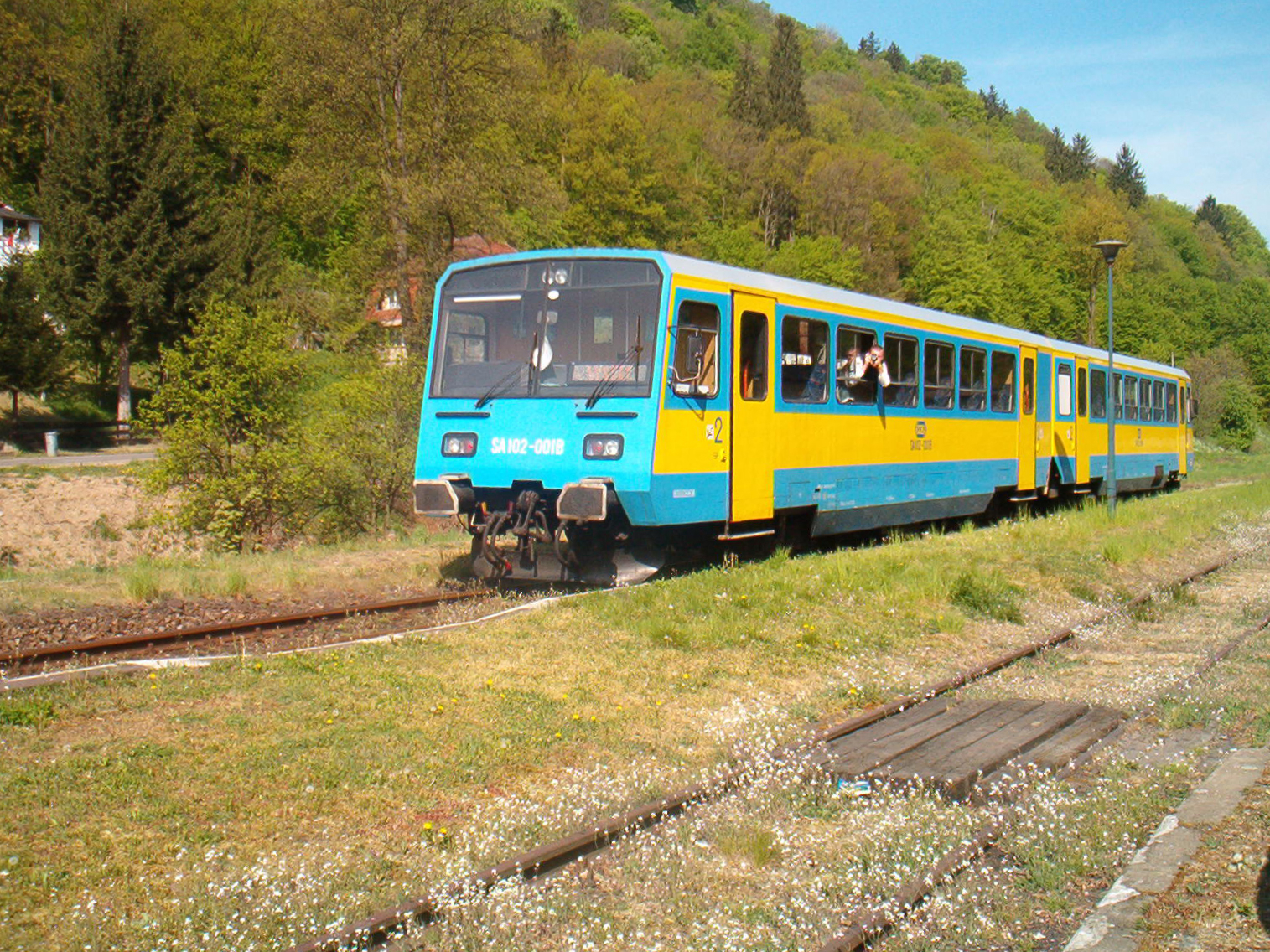
SA102 on the Jelenia Góra–Lwówek Śląski route at Wleń railway station (2007)

The section of the line from Jelenia Góra to Lwówek Śląski, compared to the neighboring sections, did not stand out much in terms of connections and traffic. Excluding transit traffic, more than 207,000 people were transported on the Jeżów Sudecki–Dębowy Gaj section in 1928. A significant part of the traffic was made up of tourist travel. By the end of the 1920s, over 20,000 tickets were sold annually at the Pilchowice and Marczów stops, and over 70,000 at Wleń. Before World War II, the section from Lwówek Śląski to Żagań also had a local character. Additionally, because the line from Zebrzydowa to Żagań ran near a military training area, it was used by the military for transporting soldiers and supplies. In 1939, nine pairs of passenger trains ran on the Jelenia Góra–Lwówek Śląski route, two of which were extended to Zebrzydowa and four to Żagań. During World War II, the number of train pairs was reduced (in 1944 to six on the Jelenia Góra–Lwówek Śląski route).

In the mid-1950s, due to a damaged bridge on the Jelenia Góra–Zgorzelec line, passenger services were redirected through Lwówek Śląski. At that time, nine pairs of passenger trains were running, including direct connections to Węgliniec, Poznań, and Szczecin, as well as services on the Jelenia Góra–Lwówek Śląski–Świeradów-Zdrój route. Until the 1980s, the offer of train connections remained at a steady level, maintaining connections from Jelenia Góra to Poznań, Szczecin, Świeradów-Zdrój, and Złotoryja.

Since the 1980s, there has been a decline in the railway network in the Lwówek Śląski area. In January 1983, connections to Gryfów Śląski were discontinued, along with the direct Lwówek Śląski–Świeradów-Zdrój connection. In October 1991, passenger services on the Lwówek Śląski–Jerzmanice-Zdrój route were suspended.

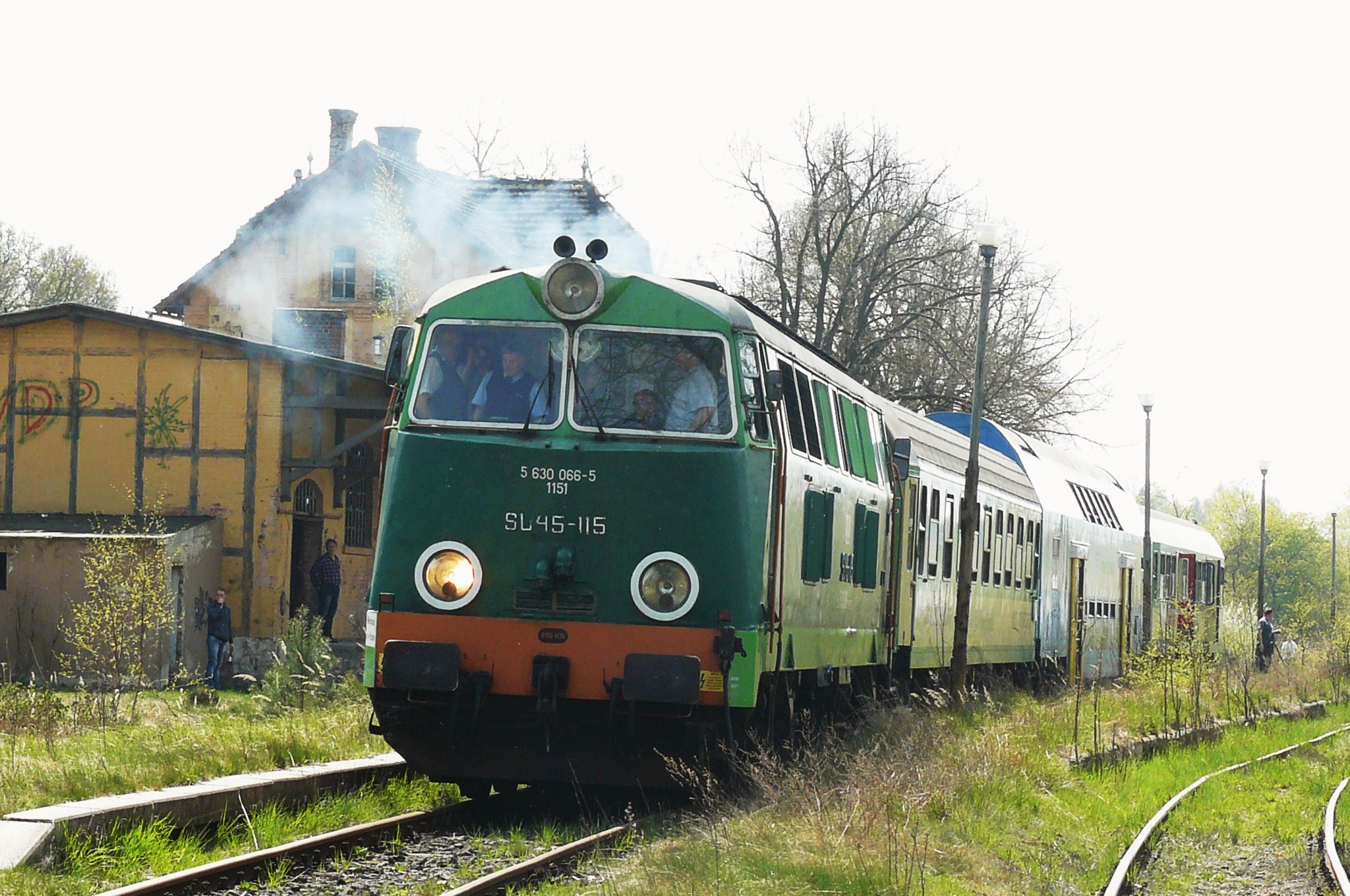
SU45 with the special train Dolnośląskie Zakamarki in 2015 at the former Osiecznica Kliczków railway station

In the 1990s, the offer of passenger connections was further reduced. On 1 January 1996, passenger trains on the Lwówek Śląski–Zebrzydowa section were suspended, leaving only the Jelenia Góra–Lwówek Śląski route in passenger service on line 284. By mid-1999, there were six pairs of passenger trains operating on the Jelenia Góra–Lwówek Śląski section, and four during the 2000/01 period. At that time, in order to improve the line’s profitability, SA102 railbuses were introduced, which were quite unreliable. In 2004, the number of pairs of connections was reduced to two per day, and in July 2005, they were replaced by replacement bus services.

Thanks to the efforts of local government authorities, the line was saved from complete passenger service closure. In December 2007, passenger service was reintroduced on the Lwówek Śląski–Zebrzydowa section, and special trains were occasionally run.

In July 2008, for a short period, international trains to the Czech Republic appeared, running on weekends on the Lwówek Śląski–Jelenia Góra–Trutnov section until 2009. In that year, five pairs of passenger trains ran on the Jelenia Góra–Lwówek Śląski route, operated by PKP Przewozy Regionalne with rail vehicles SA106, SA132, SA134, and SA135. The journey time for the entire route was then about 55 minutes.

Overall, in the first decade of the 21st century, thanks to the introduction of railcar sets and an increase in services, traffic on the line grew, but there were quite a few situations where trains were cancelled without explanation or were replaced by Railway Bus Services.

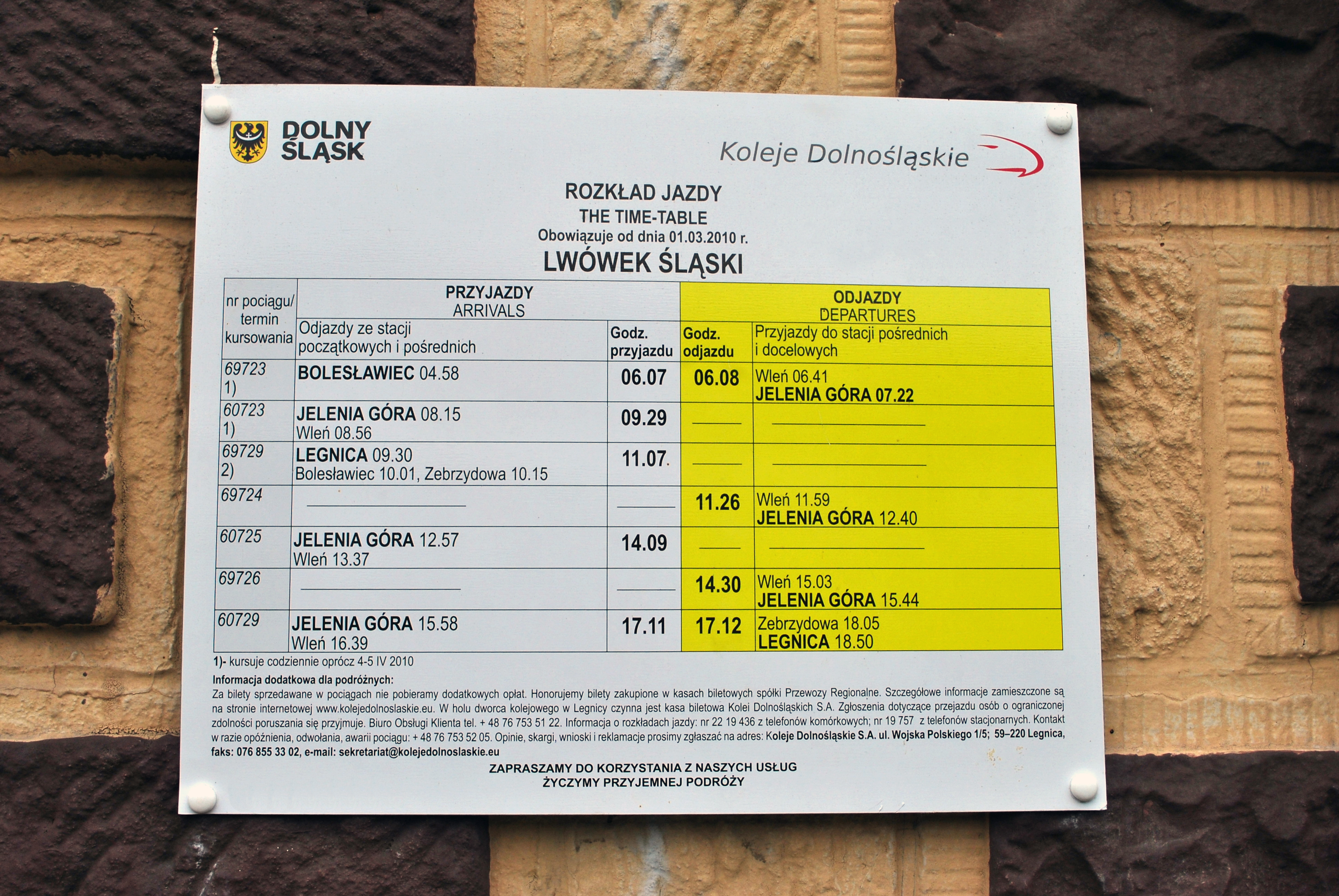
Timetable of the Lwówek Śląski railway station from 2010

From the 2009/2010 timetable, passenger services were operated by the local carrier – Lower Silesian Railways. In 2012, passenger traffic on the Jelenia Góra–Lwówek Śląski line was relatively low. At that time, in terms of passenger flow on weekdays, it was the line with the lowest attendance in the Lower Silesian Voivodeship, right after the Szklarska Poręba Górna–Harrachov line. During that period, 4 pairs of trains operated on weekdays and 3 on weekends, with an average travel time of 1 hour and 16 minutes. The daily operational train kilometers for the Jelenia Góra–Wleń section were 143.2 train-kilometers, and for the Wleń–Lwówek Śląski section, it was 117.6 train-kilometers. On the Jelenia Góra–Wleń route, an average of 81 passengers traveled daily (on average 10 people per train), while on the Wleń–Lwówek Śląski section, 84 passengers (10.5 people per train) traveled daily.

Since 12 December 2014, passenger traffic has been carried out on the Jelenia Góra–Lwówek Śląski–Zebrzydowa section. Weekend and holiday services were operated by Lower Silesian Railways on line D12: one pair of the Dolina Bobru train on the Jelenia Góra–Wrocław route and an additional pair on the Jelenia Góra–Lwówek Śląski section. As of mid-June 2016, the average travel time on the Jelenia Góra–Lwówek Śląski section was 1 hour and 48 minutes, and on the Lwówek Śląski–Zebrzydowa section, it was 56 minutes. In total (including freight trains), between January and November 2016, the line had an average of 1.3 train runs per day.

Since 11 December 2016, passenger services on this line have been suspended. The last passenger train on the Jelenia Góra–Zebrzydowa section was the special train Ostatni Leniwiec, which ran that day by Lower Silesian Railways on the Jelenia Góra–Lwówek Śląski–Zebrzydowa–Wrocław route. The main reason for discontinuing the service was the deteriorating technical condition of the railway line. Already in 2009, the speed of passenger trains was limited by PKP Polskie Linie Kolejowe to 30 km/h, which increased the travel time between Jelenia Góra and Lwówek Śląski to 1 hour and 15 minutes. In 2011, the travel time increased to nearly two hours due to further speed restrictions – to 20 km/h. In September 2016, on the 13-kilometer section, the speed dropped to 10 km/h, causing train delays of up to 40 minutes, as these restrictions were not reflected in the timetables. Lower Silesian Railways declared that, should normal speed limits be restored, they could operate six pairs of trains. On 11 December 2016, bus replacement services were introduced on the Jelenia Góra–Lwówek Śląski section, operating on weekends with two pairs of connections per day. Bus services are operated by PKS Tour Jelenia Góra.

=== Freight transport ===
During the Polish People's Republic era, the line was heavily exploited for freight traffic. Sand, aggregates, and gypsum were transported from Zebrzydowa, while coal, agricultural products, wood, and gas were transported from Jelenia Góra.

Since the 1990s, freight traffic has been limited to occasionally running shunting trains on the Jelenia Góra–Lwówek Śląski section, operating on average once a week. More significant traffic occurs on the Niwnice (Rakowice gravel pit)–Zebrzydowa section, where in 2009, 3 pairs of freight trains operated daily.

== Bibliography ==
- Dominas, Przemysław (2011). "Architektura dworców kolei doliny Bobru (Jelenia Góra – Lwówek Śląski) jako atrakcja turystyczna" [Architecture of the Bóbr Valley Railway Stations (Jelenia Góra – Lwówek Śląski) as a Tourist Attraction] (PDF). Biuletyn Naukowy Wrocławskiej Wyższej Szkoły Informatyki Stosowanej. Turystyka i Rekreacja (in Polish). 2 (2). ISSN 1895-3700. Archived (PDF) from the original on 2016-03-25.
- Woźniak, Michał (2009). "100 lat Kolei Doliny Bobru" [100 Years of the Bóbr Valley Railway]. Świat kolei (in Polish). 9. Łódź: Emi-Press. ISSN 1234-5962.
