= Kierzno =

Kierzno may refer to the following villages in Poland:

- Kierzno, Greater Poland Voivodeship (west-central Poland)
- Kierżno, Lower Silesian Voivodeship (south-west Poland)
- Kierzno, Lubusz Voivodeship (west Poland)
