= Zebrzydowa-Wieś =

- Village
- Location within Poland
- Coordinates: 51°14′N 15°23′E
- Country: Poland
- Voivodeship: Lower Silesian
- County: Bolesławiec
- Gmina: Nowogrodziec
- Population: 1,500

Zebrzydowa-Wieś [zɛbʐɨˈdɔva ˈvjɛɕ] is a village in the administrative district of Gmina Nowogrodziec, within Bolesławiec County, Lower Silesian Voivodeship, in south-western Poland.
