= Czerna, Bolesławiec County =

Czerna
- Village
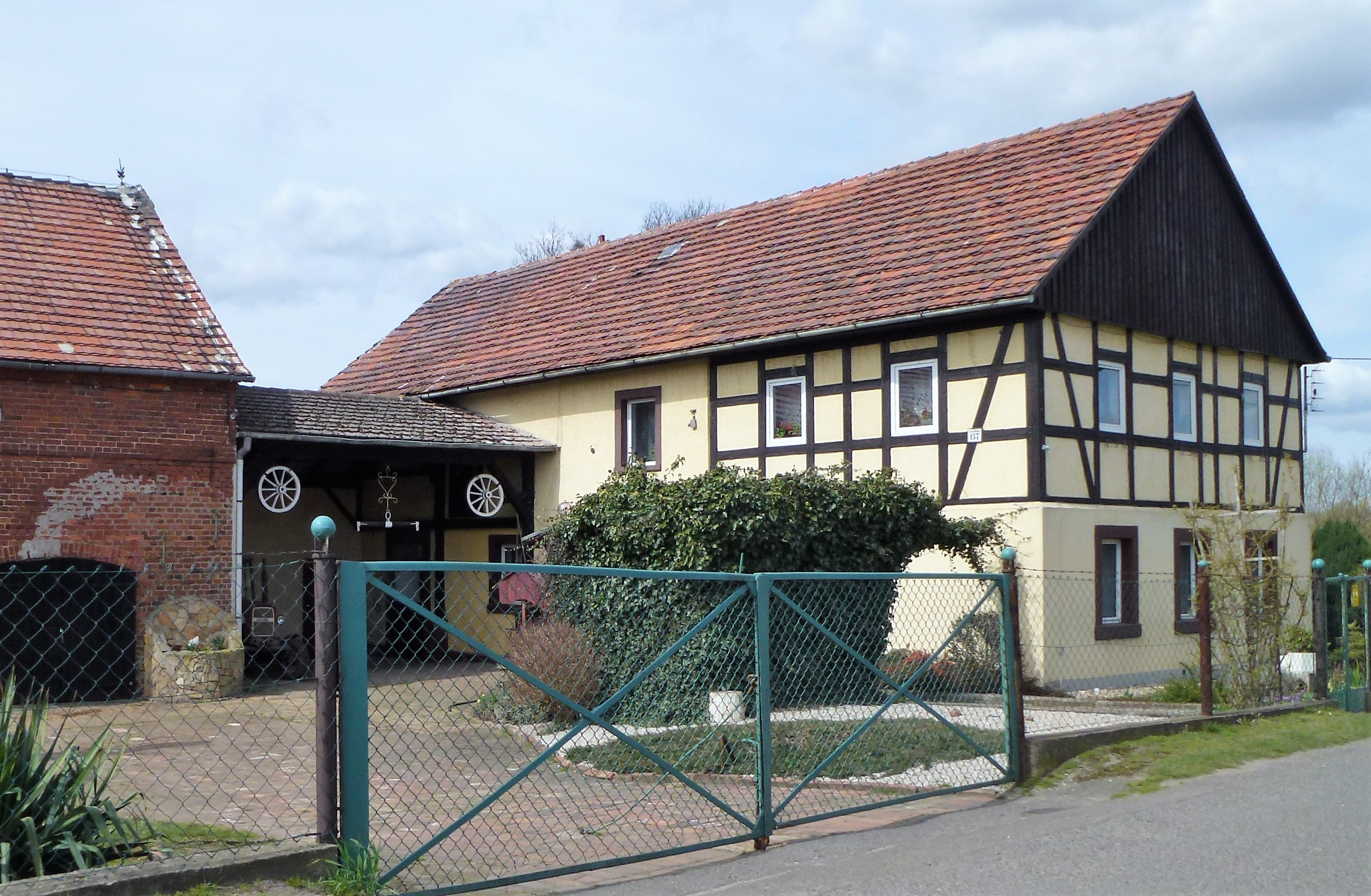

- Location within Poland
- Coordinates: 51°13′24″N 15°21′17″E
- Country: Poland
- Voivodeship: Lower Silesian
- County: Bolesławiec
- Gmina: Nowogrodziec
- Population: 1,100
- Time zone: UTC+1 (CET)
  - Summer (DST): UTC+2 (CEST)
- Vehicle registration: DBL

Czerna [ˈt͡ʂɛrna] is a village in the administrative district of Gmina Nowogrodziec, within Bolesławiec County, Lower Silesian Voivodeship, in south-western Poland.

== History ==
During World War II, the Germans operated a penal forced labour camp, and the E234 forced labour subcamp of the Stalag VIII-B/344 prisoner-of-war camp in the village.

== Transport ==
The Polish National road 94 passes through the village, and the A4 motorway runs nearby, northwest of the village.
