= Parzyce, Lower Silesian Voivodeship =

Parzyce
- Village
- Location within Poland
- Coordinates: 51°14′N 15°23′E
- Country: Poland
- Voivodeship: Lower Silesian
- County: Bolesławiec
- Gmina: Nowogrodziec

Population
  - Total: 747

Parzyce [paˈʐɨt͡sɛ] is a village in the administrative district of Gmina Nowogrodziec, within Bolesławiec County, Lower Silesian Voivodeship, in south-western Poland.
