= Milików =

- Village
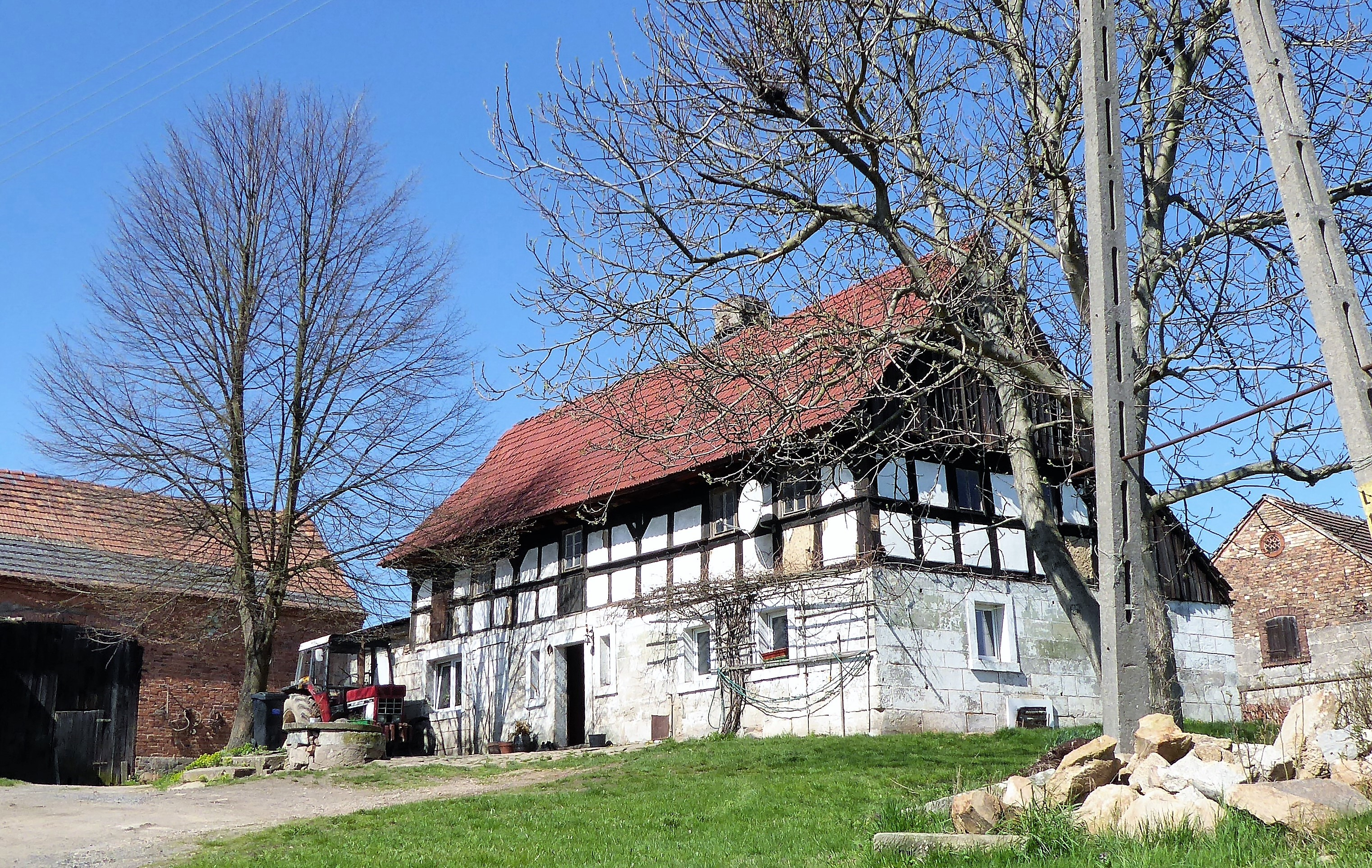
- House in the village

- Location within Poland
- Coordinates: 51°11′02″N 15°24′48″E
- Country: Poland
- Voivodeship: Lower Silesian
- County: Bolesławiec
- Gmina: Nowogrodziec

Milików [miˈlikuf] (German: Herzogswaldau) is a village in the administrative district of Gmina Nowogrodziec, within Bolesławiec County, Lower Silesian Voivodeship, in south-western Poland.
