= Nowa Wieś, Gmina Nowogrodziec =

Nowa Wieś
- Village
- Location within Poland
- Coordinates: 51°15′38″N 15°24′25″E
- Country: Poland
- Voivodeship: Lower Silesian
- County: Bolesławiec
- Gmina: Nowogrodziec
- Elevation: 180 m (590 ft)
- Population: 710

Nowa Wieś [ˈnɔva ˈvjɛɕ] is a village in the administrative district of Gmina Nowogrodziec, within Bolesławiec County, Lower Silesian Voivodeship, in south-western Poland.
