= Godzieszów =

- Village
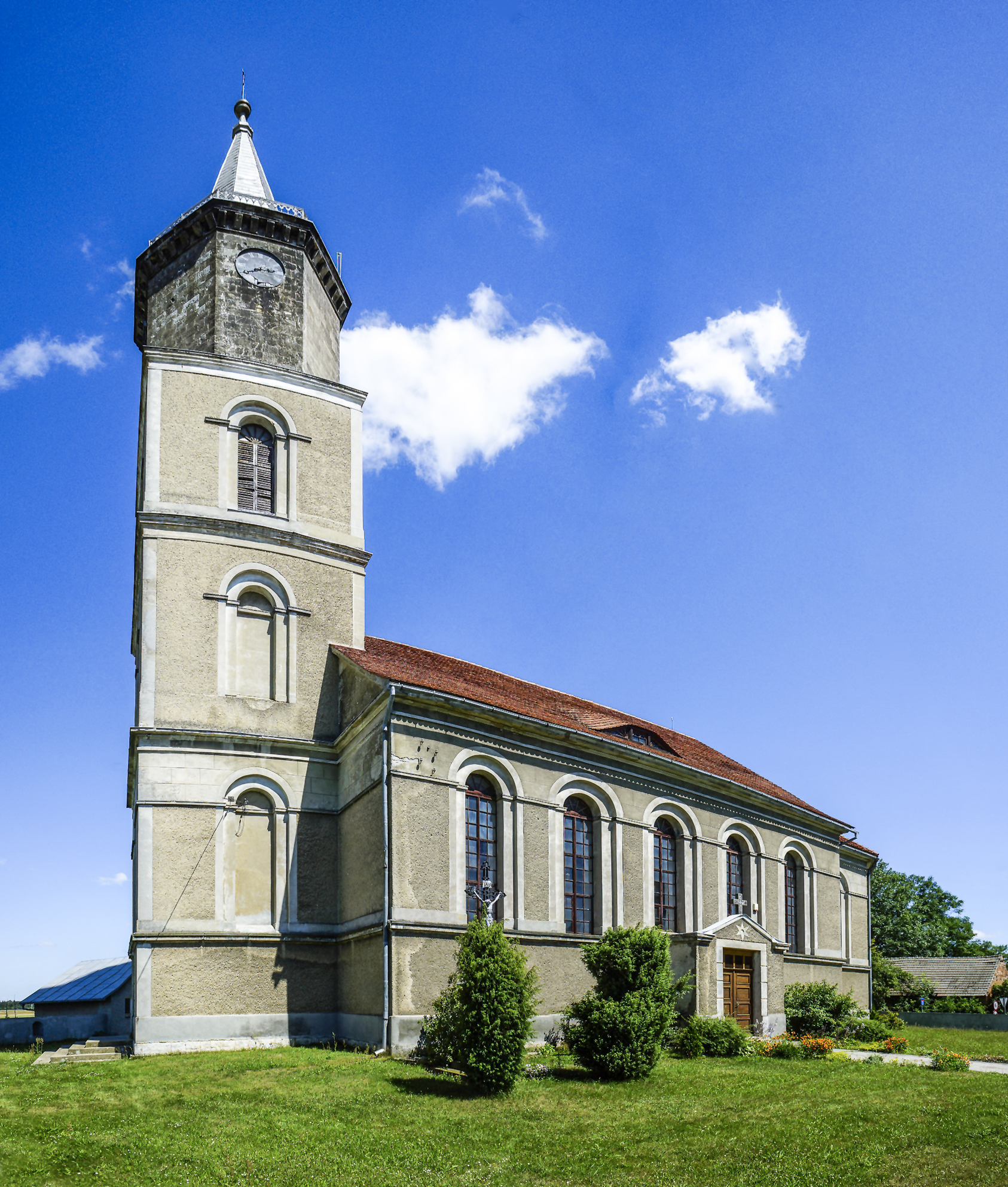
- Church of the Assumption of the Virgin Mary

- Location within Poland
- Coordinates: 51°12′38″N 15°14′43″E
- Country: Poland
- Voivodeship: Lower Silesian
- County: Bolesławiec
- Gmina: Nowogrodziec

Population
  - Total: 640

Godzieszów [ɡɔˈd͡ʑɛʂuf] is a village in the administrative district of Gmina Nowogrodziec, within Bolesławiec County, Lower Silesian Voivodeship, in south-western Poland.
