= Gościszów =

- Village
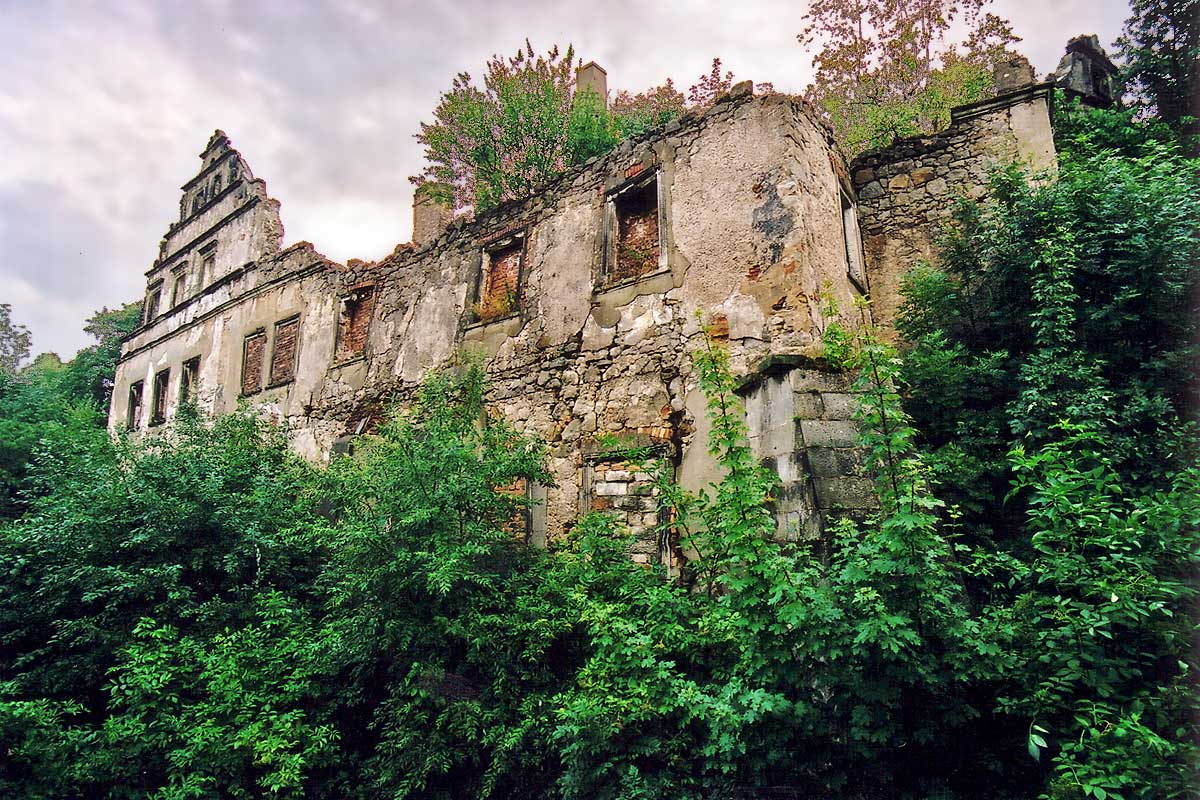

- Location within Poland
- Coordinates: 51°09′40″N 15°27′06″E
- Country: Poland
- Voivodeship: Lower Silesian
- County: Bolesławiec
- Gmina: Nowogrodziec

Population
  - Total: 1,490

Gościszów (Polish: [ɡɔˈɕt͡ɕiʂuf], German: Giessmannsdorf) is a village in the administrative district of Gmina Nowogrodziec, within Bolesławiec County, Lower Silesian Voivodeship, in south-western Poland.
