= Zebrzydowa railway station =

Railway station in south-western Poland

Zebrzydowa
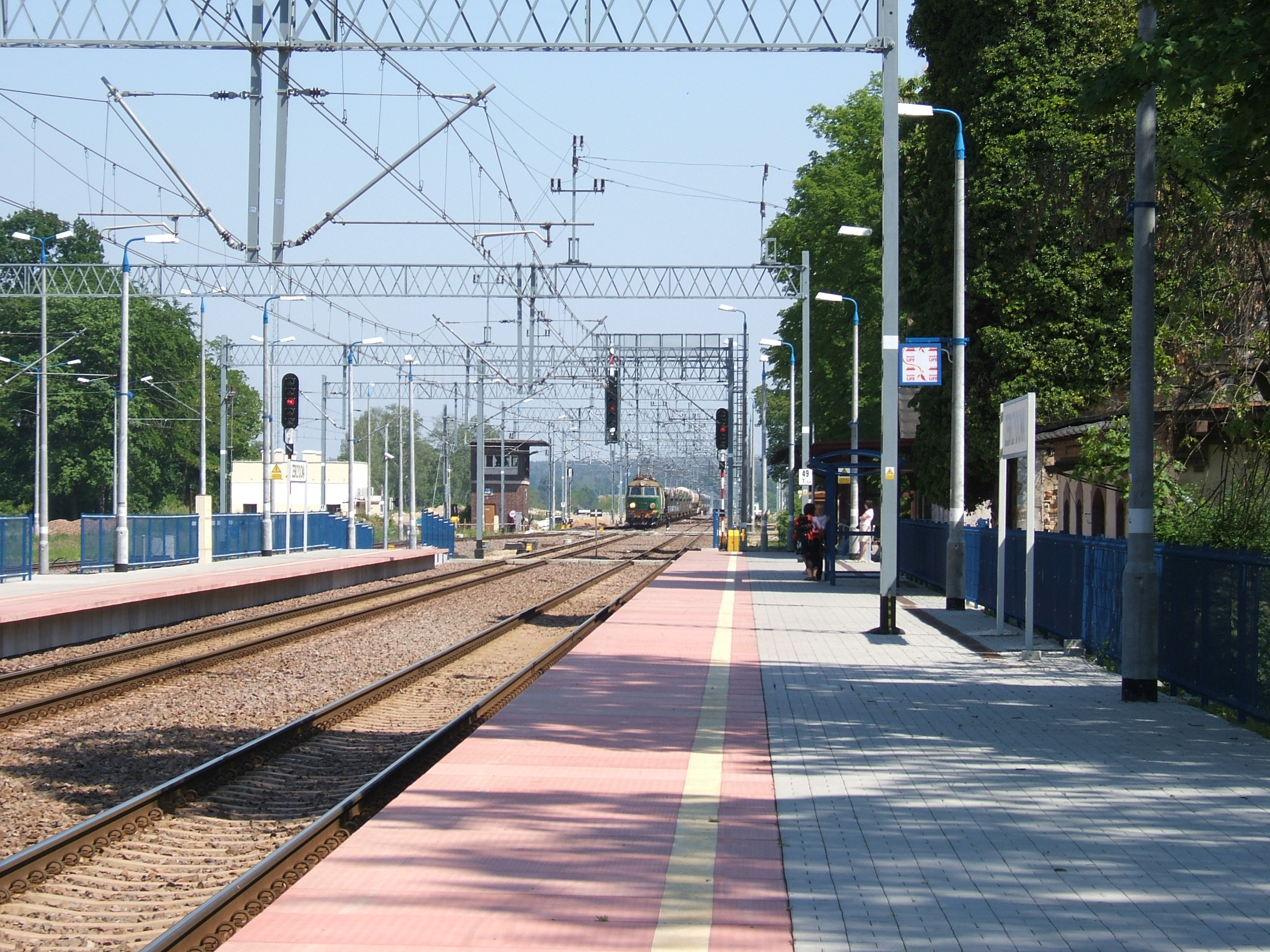
- Platforms

General information
- Location: Zebrzydowa, Lower Silesian Voivodeship; Poland
- Coordinates: 51°15′17.2″N 15°23′20.3″E
- Owner: Polskie Koleje Państwowe S.A.
- Lines: Miłkowice–Jasień railway; Jelenia Góra–Żagań railway (closed)
- Platforms: 2

History
- Opened: 1 September 1846
- Electrified: 1985
- Former names: Siegersdorf (before 1945); Zabłocie (1945–1947)

Key dates
- 2008: Rebuilt

Services
Preceding station	KD	Following station
Bolesławiec towards Wrocław Główny	D1	Zagajnik towards Lubań Śląski
Bolesławiec towards Wrocław Główny	D10	Zagajnik towards Dresden Hauptbahnhof
Location
- Location within Poland Location within Lower Silesian Voivodeship

Zebrzydowa (German: Siegersdorf) is a railway station in the village of Zebrzydowa, Bolesławiec County, within the Lower Silesian Voivodeship in south-western Poland.

== History ==
The station opened on 1 September 1846 as Siegersdorf part of the Miłkowice–Jasień railway. After World War II, the area came under Polish administration. As a result, the station was taken over by Polish State Railways and was renamed to Zabłocie, and later to its modern name Zebrzydowa in 1947.

In 2008 the station was rebuilt part of the E30 main line modernisations. Prior to the reconstruction the station had four platforms (two platforms and one island platform).

== Train services ==
The station is served by the following service(s):

- Regional services (KD) Wrocław - Legnica - Węgliniec - Lubań Śląski
- Regional services (KD) Wrocław - Legnica - Zgorzelec - Görlitz
