= Zebrzydowa =

- Village
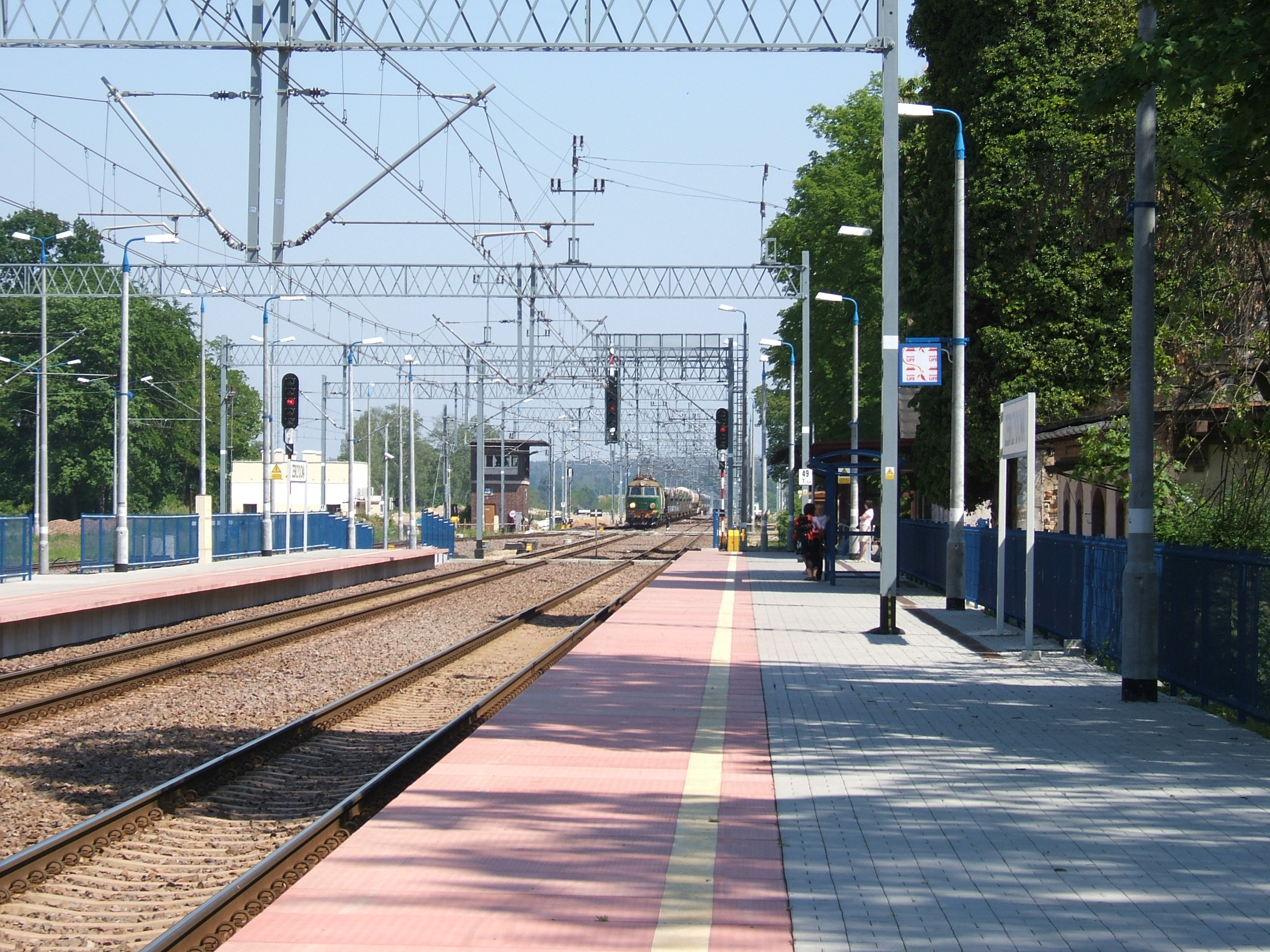
- Zebrzydowa railway station

- Location within Poland
- Coordinates: 51°14′N 15°23′E
- Country: Poland
- Voivodeship: Lower Silesian
- County: Bolesławiec
- Gmina: Nowogrodziec
- Elevation: 200 m (660 ft)

Population
  - Total: 1,400
- Time zone: UTC+1 (CET)
  - Summer (DST): UTC+2 (CEST)
- Vehicle registration: DBL

Zebrzydowa [zɛbʐɨˈdɔva] (German: Siegersdorf) is a village in the administrative district of Gmina Nowogrodziec, within Bolesławiec County, Lower Silesian Voivodeship, in south-western Poland.

== History ==
During World War II, the Germans established and operated a forced labour subcamp of the Stalag VIII-A prisoner-of-war camp in the village.

== Transport ==
The village is served by Zebrzydowa railway station on the Miłkowice–Jasień and Jelenia Góra–Żagań railways.

== Notable residents ==
- Oskar Freiherr von Boenigk (1893–1946), Luftwaffe general
