= Gmina Nowogrodziec =

Gmina Nowogrodziec Nowogrodziec Commune
- Gmina
- Coat of arms
- Interactive map of Gmina Nowogrodziec
- Coordinates (Nowogrodziec): 51°12′04″N 15°23′08″E
- Country: Poland
- Voivodeship: Lower Silesian
- County: Bolesławiec
- Seat: Nowogrodziec
- Sołectwos: Czerna, Gierałtów, Godzieszów, Gościszów, Kierżno, Milików, Nowa Wieś, Parzyce, Wykroty, Zabłocie, Zagajnik, Zebrzydowa, Zebrzydowa-Wieś

Area
  - Total: 176.26 km^{2} (68.05 sq mi)

Population (2019-06-30)
  - Total: 15,214
  - Density: 86.316/km^{2} (223.56/sq mi)
  - Urban: 4,243
  - Rural: 10,971
- Website: http://www.nowogrodziec.pl

Gmina Nowogrodziec is an urban-rural gmina (administrative district) in Bolesławiec County, Lower Silesian Voivodeship, in south-western Poland. Its seat is the town of Nowogrodziec, which lies approximately 15 kilometres (9 mi) south-west of Bolesławiec and 116 kilometres (72 mi) west of the regional capital Wrocław.

The gmina covers an area of 176.3 square kilometres (68.1 sq mi), and as of 2019 its total population is 15,214.

== Neighbouring gminas ==
Gmina Nowogrodziec is bordered by the gminas of Bolesławiec, Gryfów Śląski, Lubań, Lwówek Śląski, Osiecznica, Pieńsk and Węgliniec.

== Villages ==
Apart from the town of Nowogrodziec, the gmina contains the villages of Czerna, Gierałtów, Godzieszów, Gościszów, Kierżno, Milików, Nowa Wieś, Parzyce, Wykroty, Zabłocie, Zagajnik, Zebrzydowa and Zebrzydowa-Wieś.

== Twin towns – sister cities ==
Gmina Nowogrodziec is twinned with:

- Großdubrau, Germany
- Peremyshliany Raion, Ukraine
- Srbac, Bosnia and Herzegovina
