= Wykroty, Lower Silesian Voivodeship =

Wykroty
- Village
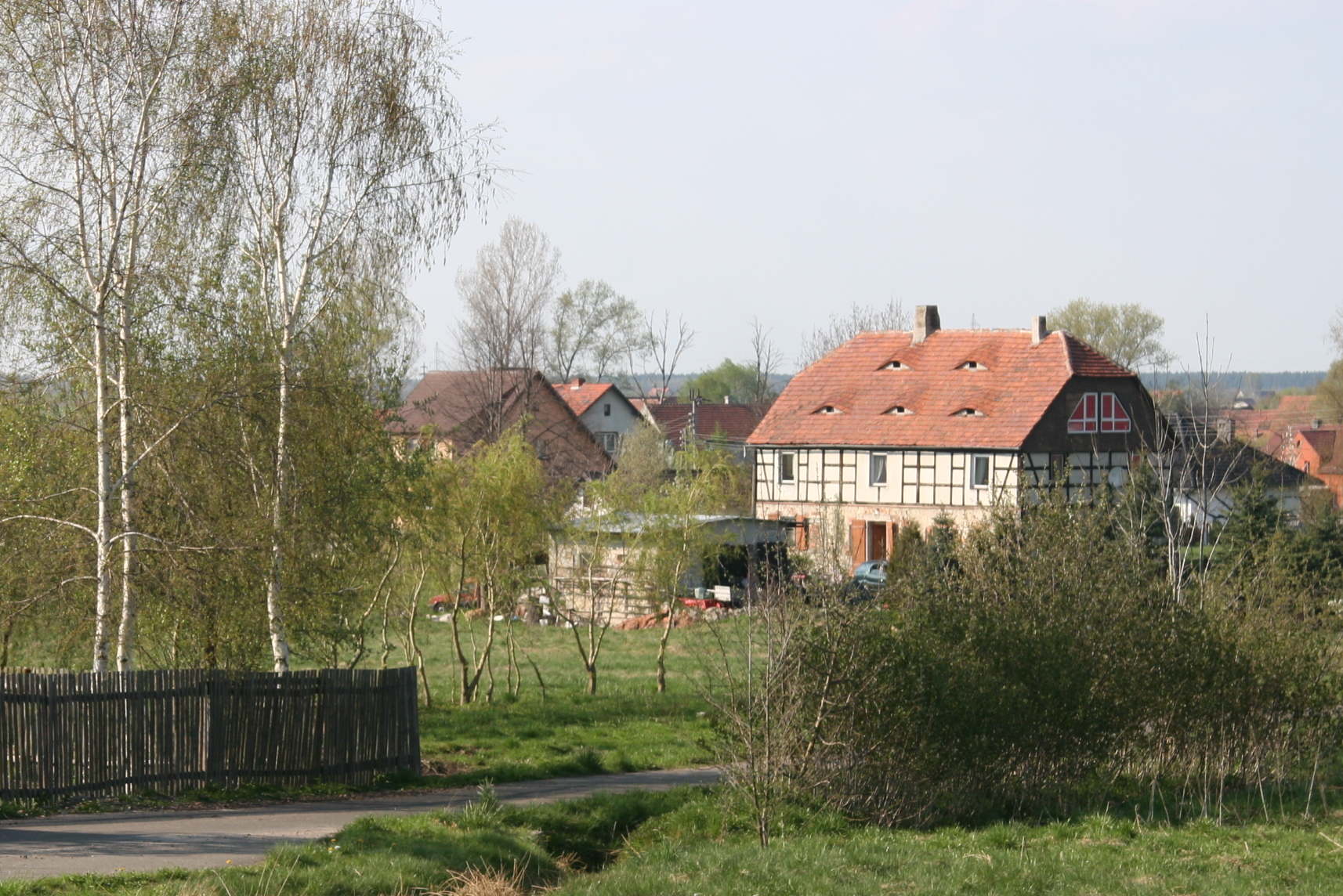

- Location within Poland
- Coordinates: 51°14′N 15°17′E
- Country: Poland
- Voivodeship: Lower Silesian
- County: Bolesławiec
- Gmina: Nowogrodziec
- Elevation: 210 m (690 ft)
- Population: 1,748

Wykroty [vɨˈkrɔtɨ] is a village in the administrative district of Gmina Nowogrodziec, within Bolesławiec County, Lower Silesian Voivodeship, in south-western Poland.
