= Zabłocie, Bolesławiec County =

Zabłocie
- Village
- Location within Poland
- Coordinates: 51°13′10″N 15°26′36″E
- Country: Poland
- Voivodeship: Lower Silesian
- County: Bolesławiec
- Gmina: Nowogrodziec
- Elevation: 170 m (560 ft)
- Population: 270

Zabłocie [zaˈbwɔt͡ɕɛ] is a village in the administrative district of Gmina Nowogrodziec, within Bolesławiec County, Lower Silesian Voivodeship, in south-western Poland.
