= Kierżno =

- Village
- Location within Poland
- Coordinates: 51°15′45″N 15°25′25″E
- Country: Poland
- Voivodeship: Lower Silesia
- County: Bolesławiec
- Gmina: Nowogrodziec
- Elevation: 83 m (272 ft)
- Population: 270

Kierżno [ˈkʲɛrʐnɔ] is a small village in the administrative district of Gmina Nowogrodziec, within Bolesławiec County, Lower Silesian Voivodeship, in south-western Poland.
