= Zagajnik railway station =

Railway station in south-western Poland

Zagajnik
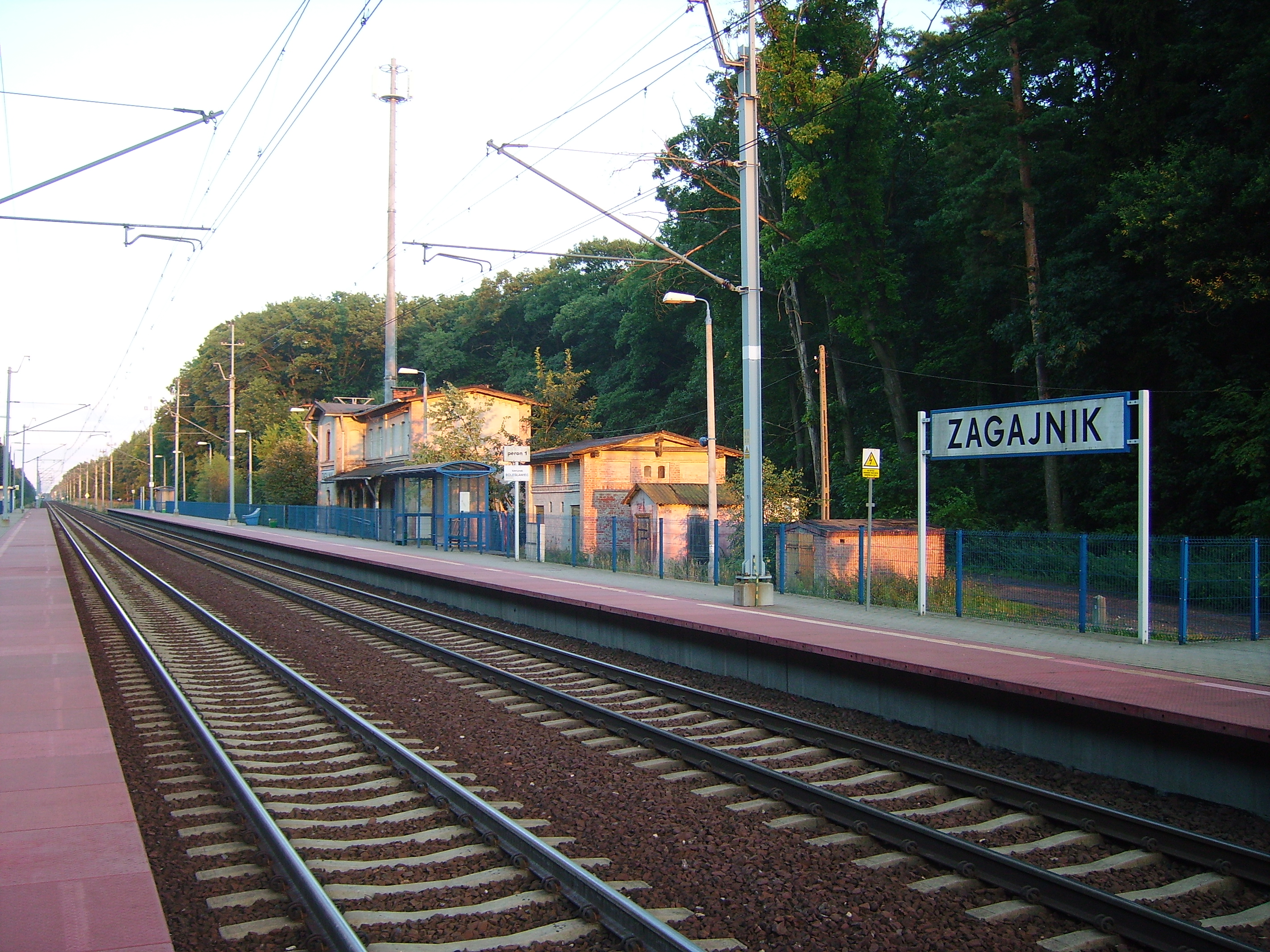
- Platforms

General information
- Location: Zagajnik, Lower Silesian Voivodeship; Poland
- Coordinates: 51°16′12.1″N 15°17′56.1″E
- Owner: Polskie Koleje Państwowe S.A.
- Line: Miłkowice–Jasień railway
- Platforms: 2

History
- Opened: 1865
- Electrified: 1985
- Former names: Haltepunkt Waldau (1865–1912); Haidewaldau (1912–1945); Goleck (1945–1947)

Services
Preceding station	KD	Following station
Zebrzydowa towards Wrocław Główny	D1	Węgliniec towards Lubań Śląski
Zebrzydowa towards Wrocław Główny	D10	Węgliniec towards Dresden Hauptbahnhof
Location
- Location within Poland

Zagajnik (German: Haidewaldau) is a railway station on the Miłkowice–Jasień railway in the village of Zagajnik, Bolesławiec County, within the Lower Silesian Voivodeship in south-western Poland.

== History ==
The station opened in 1865 as Haltepunkt Waldau. In 1912 the station was renamed to Haidewaldau. After World War II, the area past the Lusatian Neisse and Oder rivers came under Polish administration. As a result, the station was taken over by Polish State Railways and was renamed to Goleck, and later to its modern name Zagajnik in 1947.

== Train services ==
The station is served by the following services:

- Regional services (KD) Wrocław - Legnica - Węgliniec - Lubań Śląski
- Regional services (KD) Wrocław - Legnica - Zgorzelec - Görlitz
