= Jelenia Góra Zabobrze railway station =

Railway station in Jelenia Góra, south-western Poland

Jelenia Góra Zabobrze
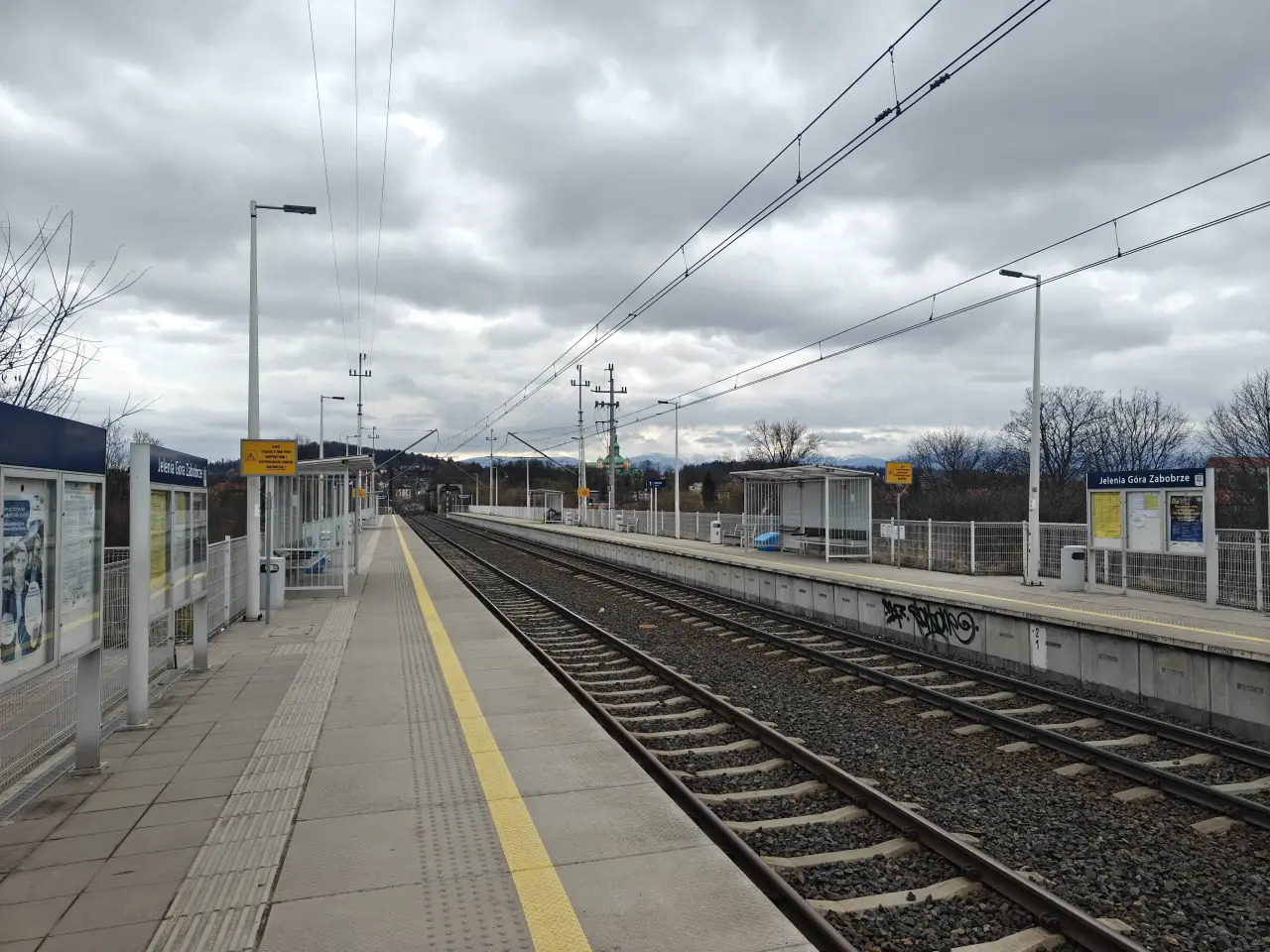
- Platforms in April 2026

General information
- Location: Jelenia Góra, Lower Silesian Voivodeship; Poland
- Coordinates: 50°54′38.5″N 15°44′33.0″E
- Owner: Polish State Railways
- Lines: Wrocław Świebodzki–Zgorzelec; Jelenia Góra–Jakuszyce
- Platforms: 2

History
- Opened: 15 December 2019
- Former names: Reibnitz (1865–1945); Rybnick (1945–1947)

Services
| Preceding station | KD | Following station |
|---|---|---|
| Jelenia Góra towards Wrocław Główny | D60 | Jelenia Góra Zachodnia towards Szklarska Poręba Górna |
| Jelenia Góra towards Karpacz | D62 | Stara Kamienica towards Görlitz |
Location
- Location within Poland Location within Lower Silesian Voivodeship

Jelenia Góra Zabobrze is a railway station in the city of Jelenia Góra in the Lower Silesian Voivodeship in south-western Poland.

== History ==
In November 2018, Polish State Railways (PKP) announced the construction of Jelenia Góra Zabobrze railway station. Together with Jelenia Góra Przemysłowa, the total construction cost of the two stations came out to about 18 million PLN, fully funded by the Lower Silesian Voivodeship.

The station opened on 15 December 2019, together with Jelenia Góra Przemysłowa. It is served by Lower Silesian Railways.

== Station ==
Jelenia Góra Zabobrze is a railway halt on the Wrocław Świebodzki–Zgorzelec and Jelenia Góra–Jakuszyce railways. The platforms each are 150 m (490 ft) long, and 76 cm (30 in) high. Thanks to them being high-level, the station is accessible.

== Train services ==
The station is served by the following services:

- Regional services (KD) Wrocław - Wałbrzych - Jelenia Góra - Szklarska Poręba Górna
- Regional services (KD) Karpacz / Świeradów-Zdrój - Gryfów Śląski - Görlitz
