= Nowogrodziec =

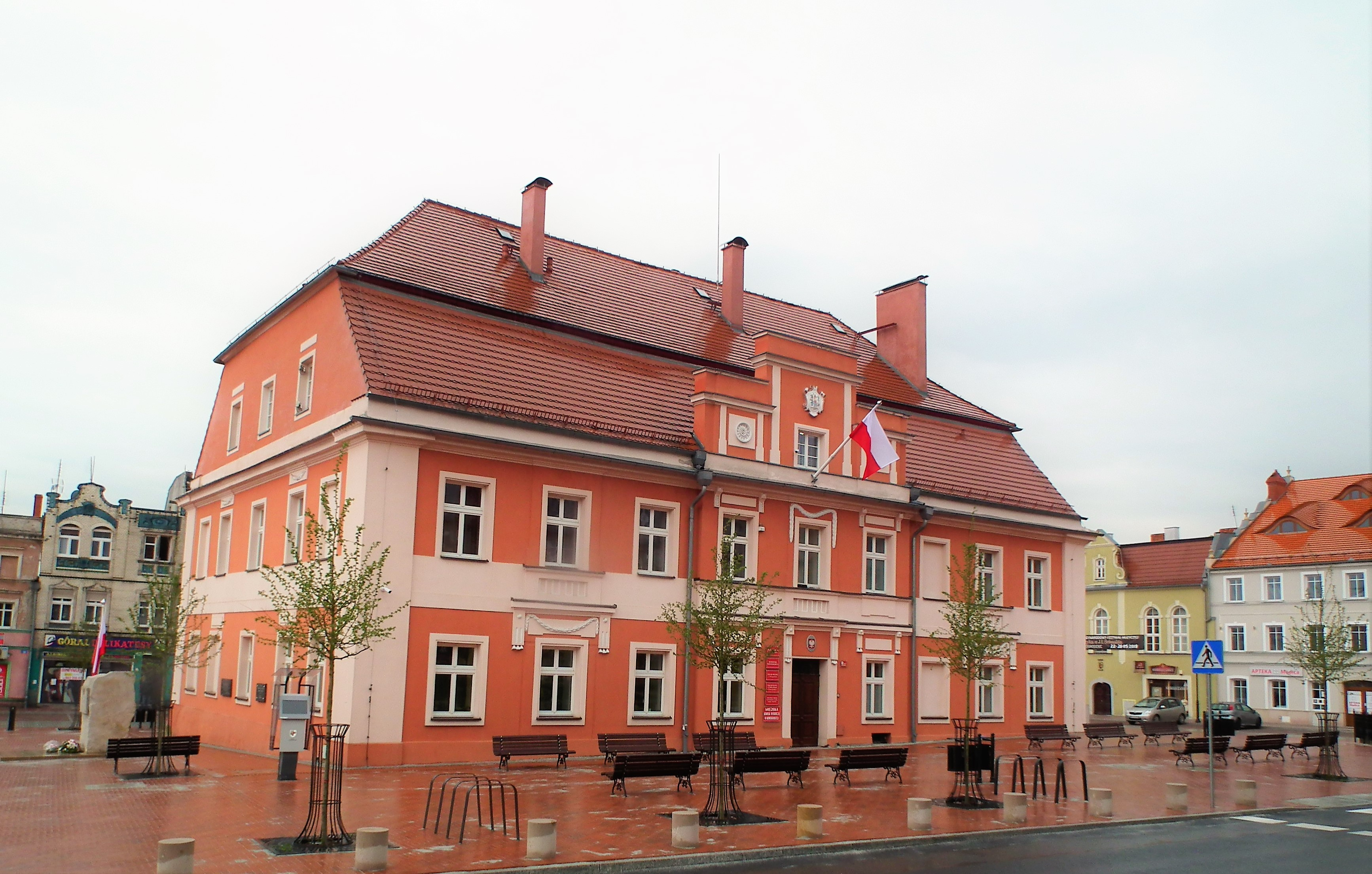
- Town hall at the Market Square

- Flag Coat of arms

- Location within Poland
- Coordinates: 51°12′4″N 15°23′8″E
- Country: Poland
- Voivodeship: Lower Silesian
- County: Bolesławiec
- Gmina: Nowogrodziec
- Town rights: 1233

Government
  - Mayor: Joanna Świder

Area
  - Total: 16.17 km^{2} (6.24 sq mi)

Population (2019-06-30)
  - Total: 4,243
  - Density: 262.4/km^{2} (679.6/sq mi)
- Time zone: UTC+1 (CET)
  - Summer (DST): UTC+2 (CEST)
- Postal code: 59-730
- Area code: +48 75
- Car plates: DBL
- Website: http://www.nowogrodziec.pl

Nowogrodziec [nɔvɔˈɡrɔd͡ʑɛt͡s] (German: Naumburg am Queis) is a town in Bolesławiec County, Lower Silesian Voivodeship, in south-western Poland. It is the seat of the administrative district called Gmina Nowogrodziec.

As of 2019, the town has a population of 4,243.

== History ==
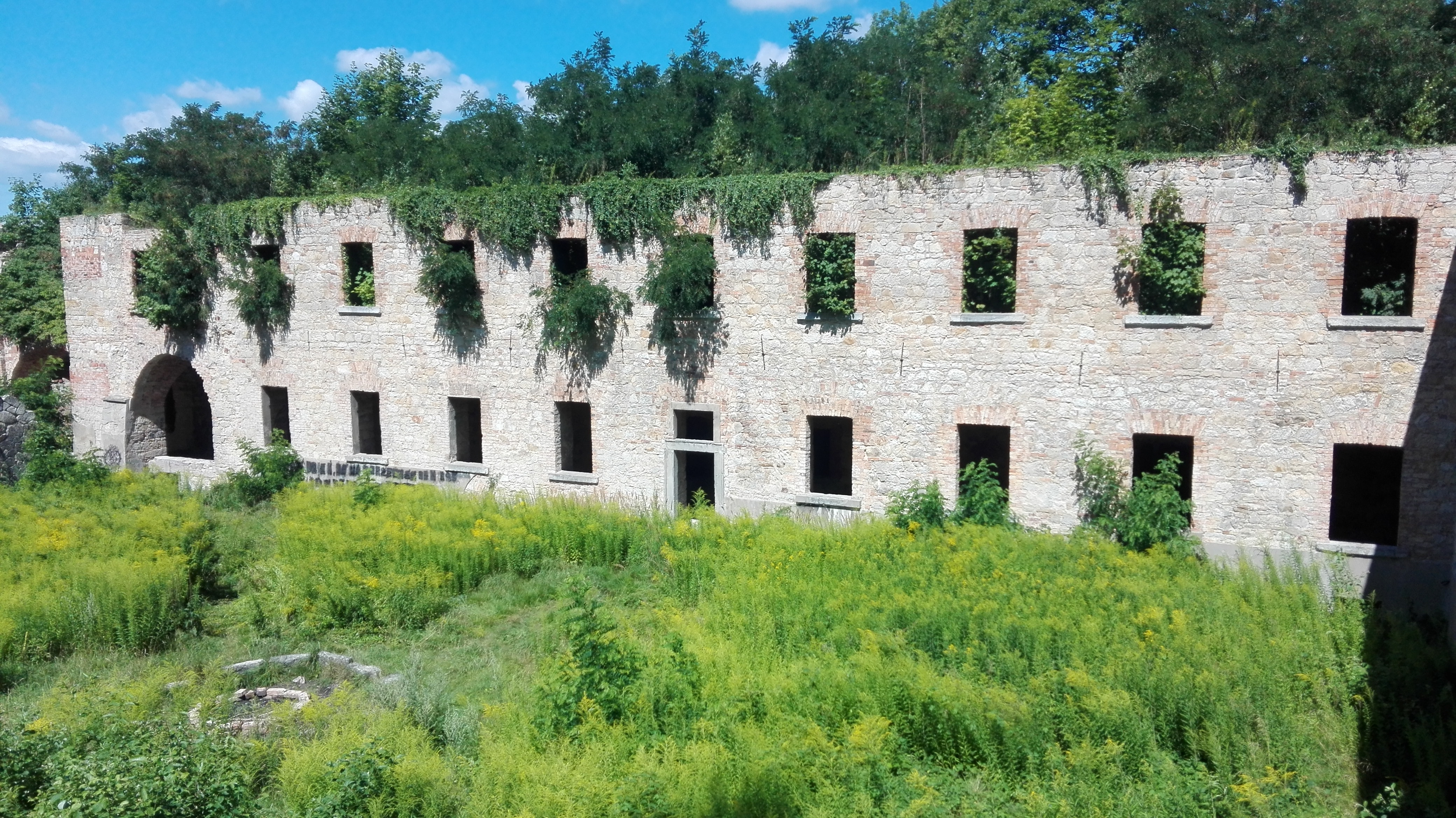
Ruins of the Magdalene monastery

Polish Duke Henry I the Bearded established the town in 1233 and granted it Magdeburg town rights. It was assigned 11 villages which were to be founded on cleared land to create a district. Earlier, in 1202, he founded a castle, which after 1217 was granted to the Magdalene Sisters. Due to the fragmentation of Poland into smaller duchies, the town later belonged to the duchies of Legnica, Głogów and Jawor, ruled by the Silesian line of the Piast dynasty. Here the important Via Regia road crossed the Kwisa, that marked the border with the historic Upper Lusatia region in the west. From 1495 the town was owned by the Magdalene monastery. It developed rapidly. The town obtained a privilege, allowing brewing and selling beer. In 1500, thanks to the efforts of the nuns, the town's first waterworks were launched. After the flood of 1496, there was an epidemic that killed half the population. Only three marriages and residents of the monastery survived the next epidemic in 1527. In the 16th century the first pottery was established, and in 1698 the first pottery guild was founded here. In 1810 the monastery was secularized and a court and a school were located in its former buildings.

From 1871 to 1945 it was part of Germany. Heavily devastated during World War II, the town passed to the Republic of Poland upon the implementation of the Oder-Neisse line in 1945. From 1975 to 1998 Nowogrodziec was in Jelenia Góra Voivodeship.

== Sights ==
Among the historic sights of Nowogrodziec are the town hall (Ratusz), the Baroque church of Saints Peter and Paul with the ruins of the Magdalene monastery, the Saint Nicholas church, the Baroque statue of John of Nepomuk at the Market Square and the Polish-Saxon post milestone of King Augustus II the Strong from 1725. The Garniec Fountain at the Market Square refers to the town's pottery traditions. Like nearby Bolesławiec, the town was once famous for its pottery.

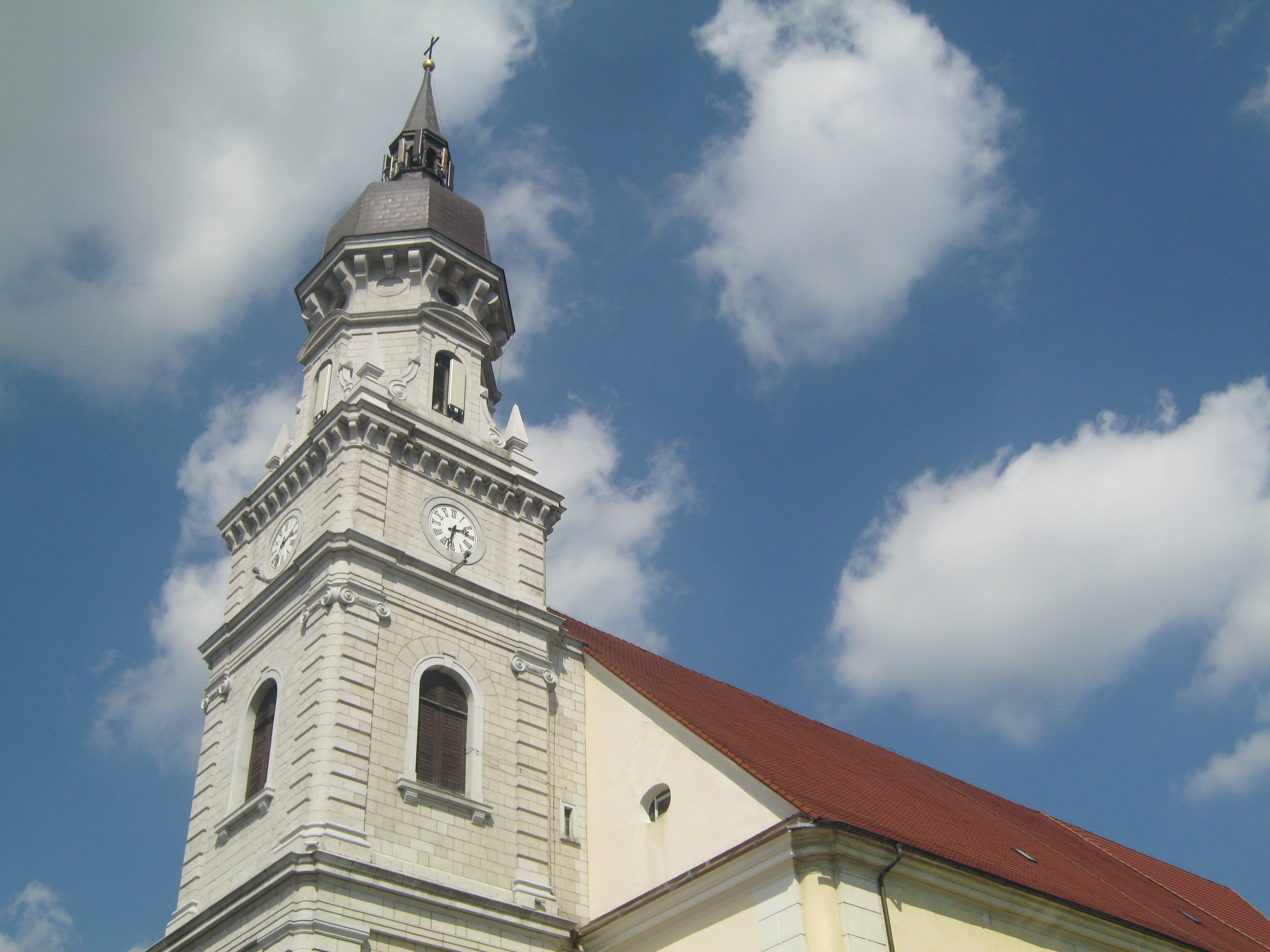
Saints Peter and Paul church

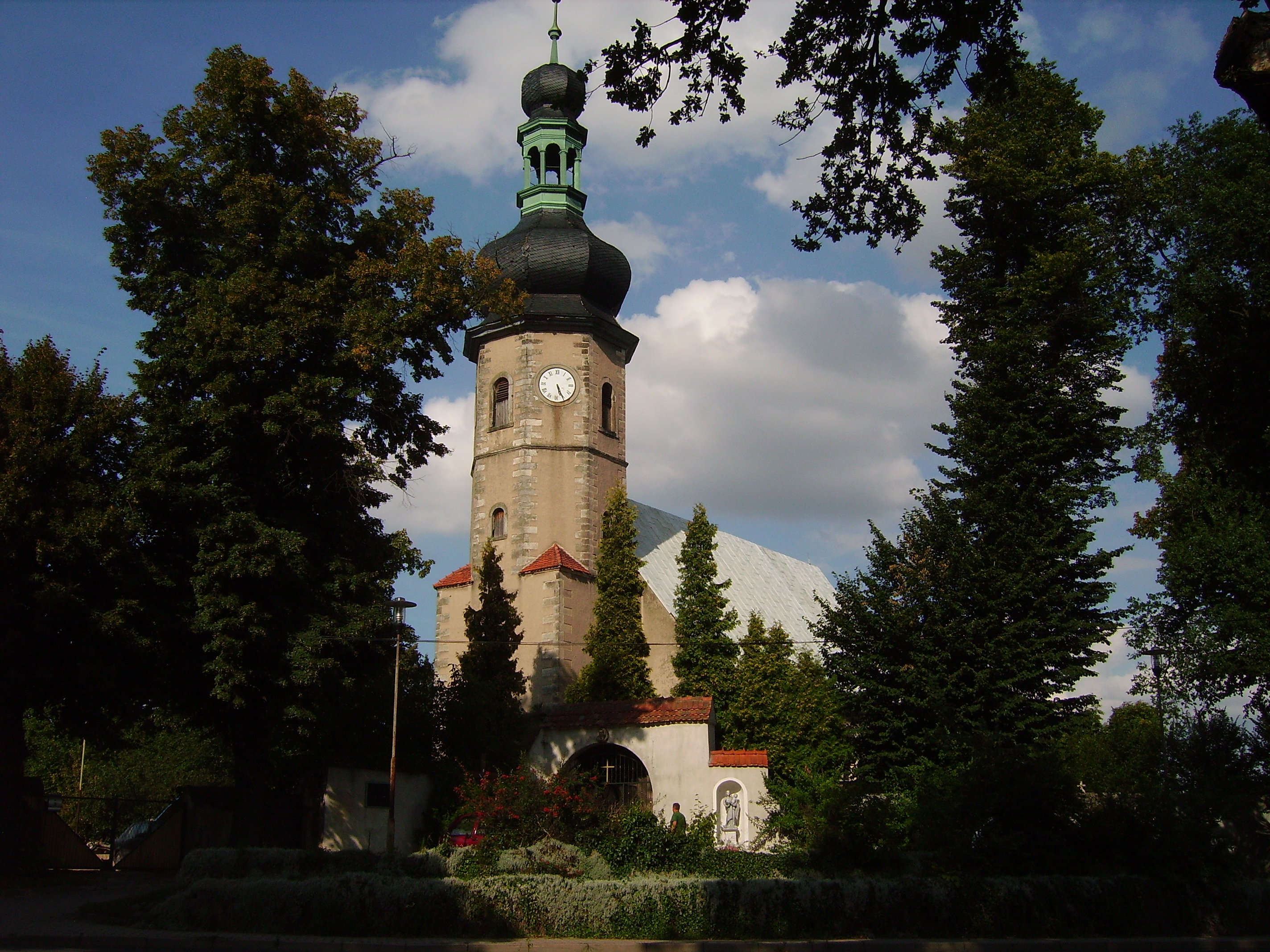
Saint Nicholas church

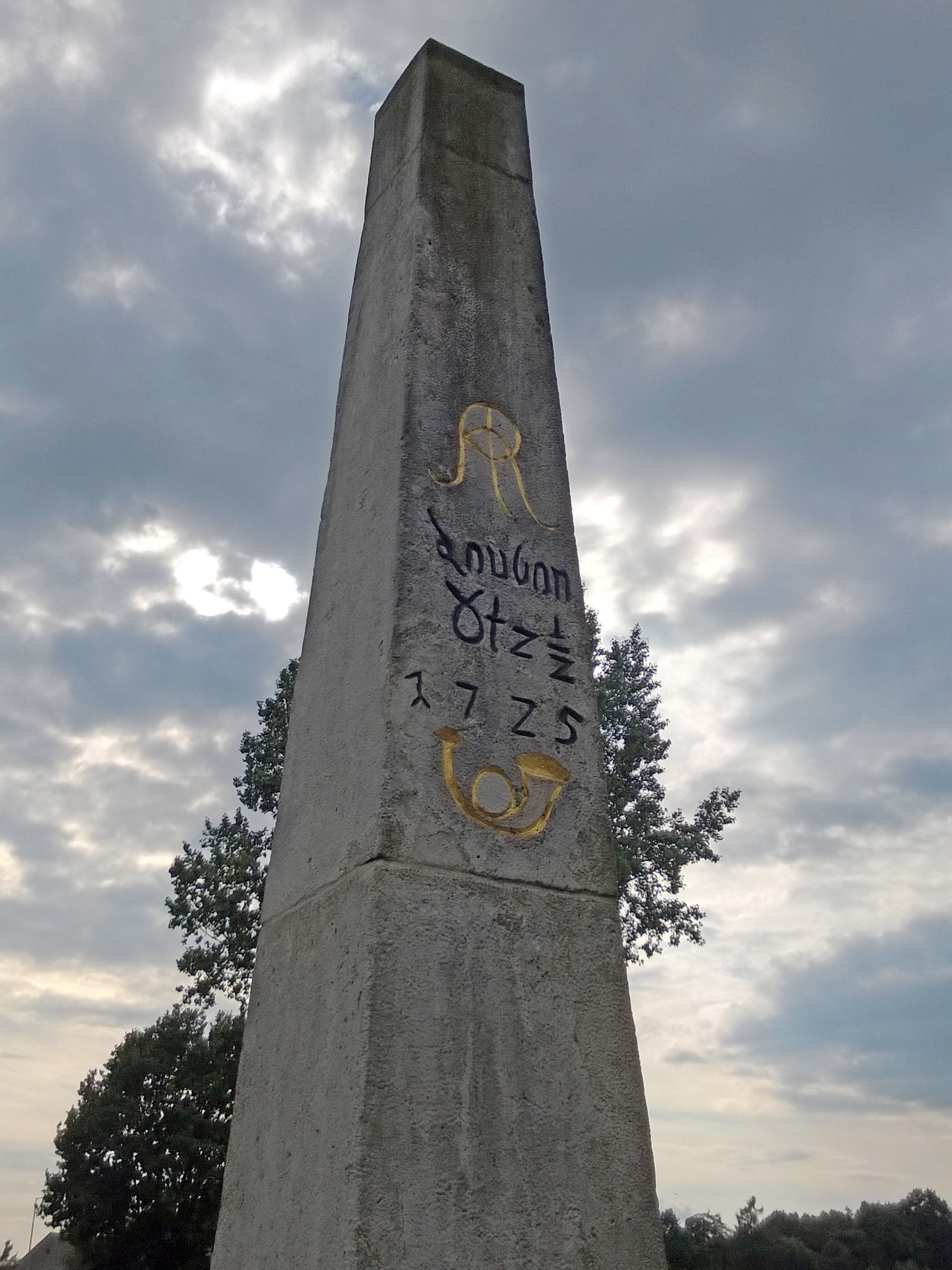
Post milestone

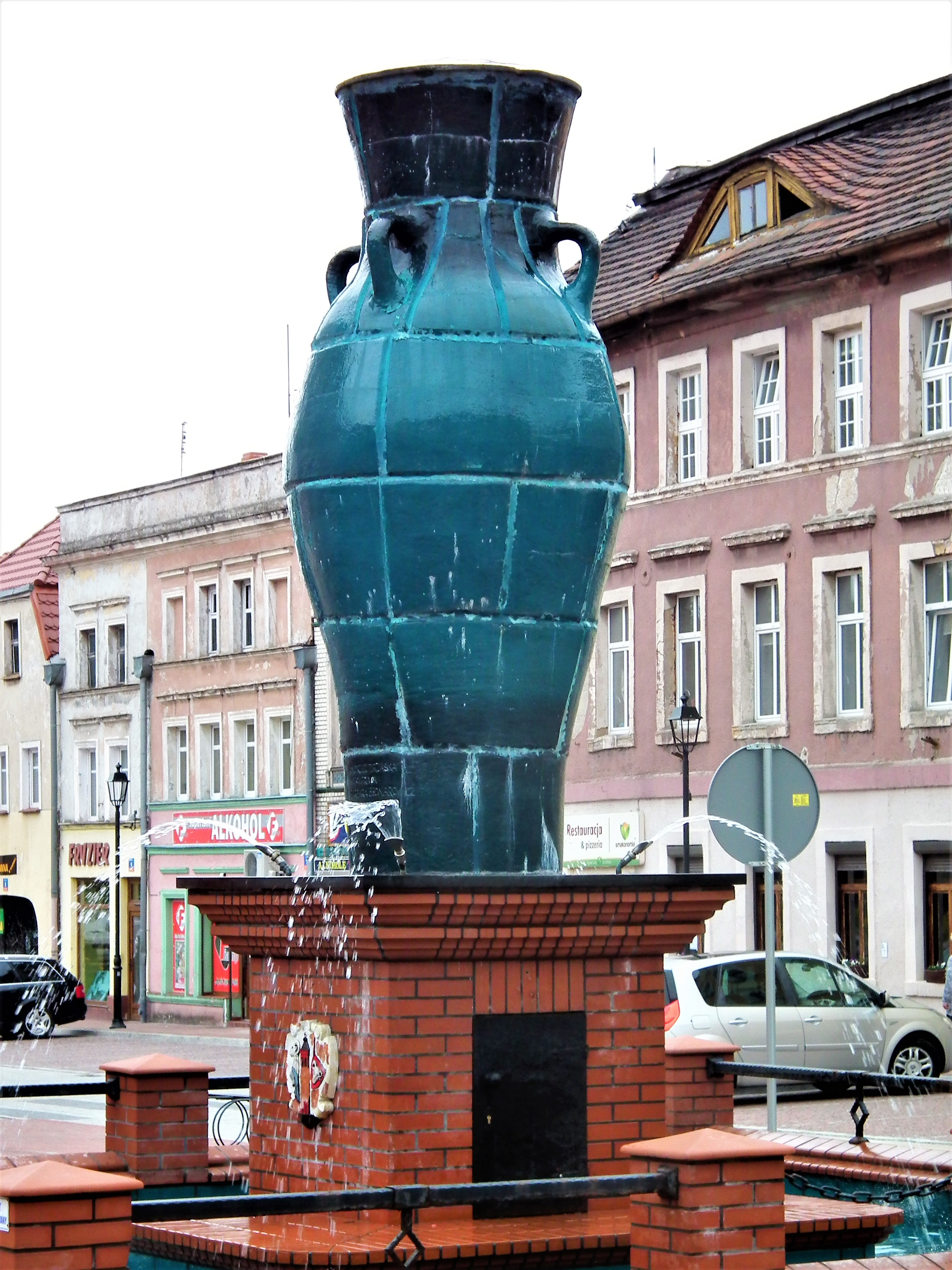
Garniec Fountain at the Market Square. Garniec was removed due to Despised technical condition.

== Twin towns – sister cities ==
See twin towns of Gmina Nowogrodziec.
