= Zagajnik, Lower Silesian Voivodeship =

Zagajnik
- Village
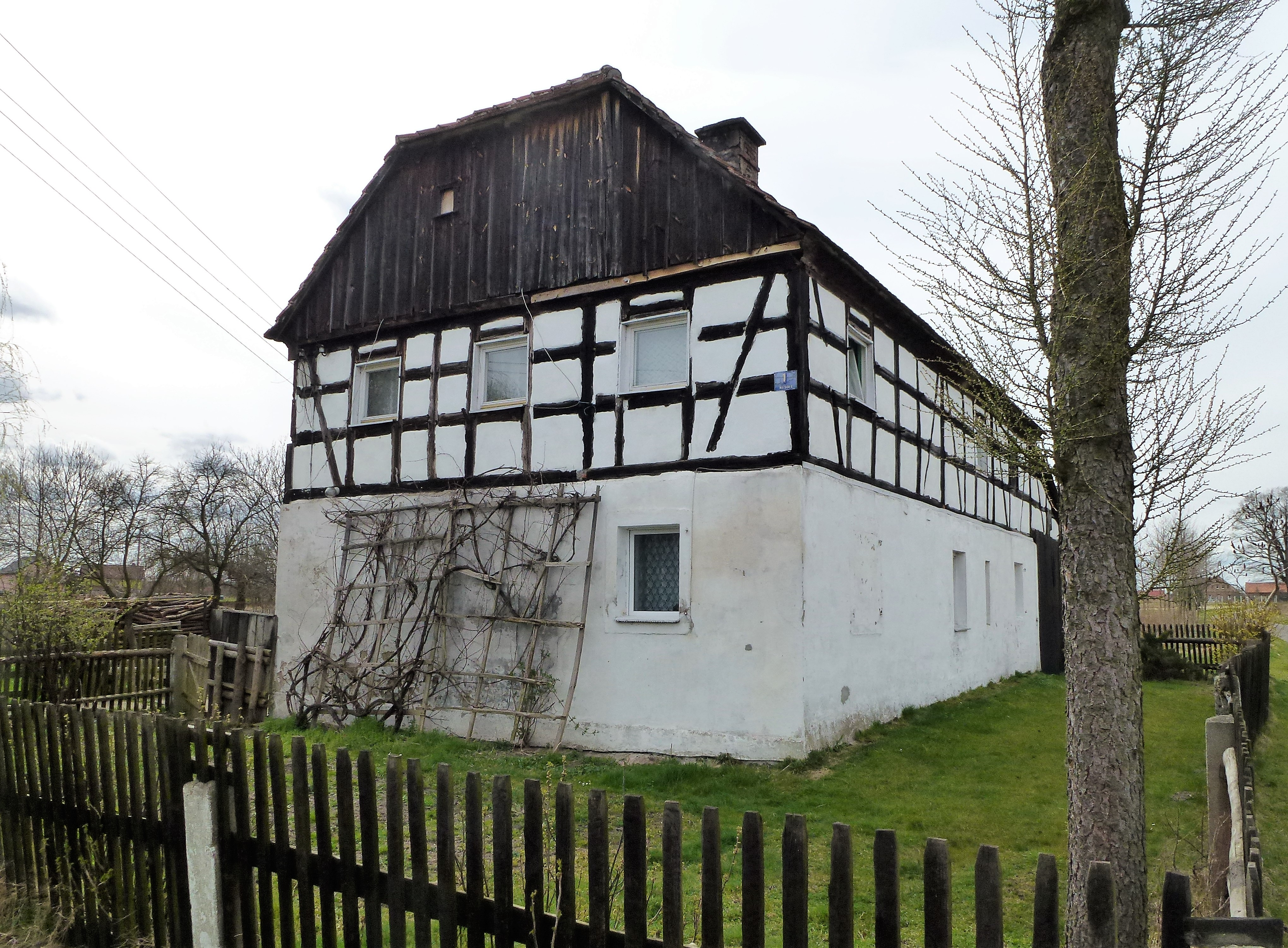

- Location within Poland
- Coordinates: 51°15′12″N 15°17′33″E
- Country: Poland
- Voivodeship: Lower Silesian
- County: Bolesławiec
- Gmina: Nowogrodziec
- Elevation: 190 m (620 ft)
- Population: 193

Zagajnik [zaˈɡai̯nik] is a village in the administrative district of Gmina Nowogrodziec, within Bolesławiec County, Lower Silesian Voivodeship, in south-western Poland.

== Transport ==
The village is served by Zagajnik railway station.
