= Nuclear renaissance in the United States =

Potential U.S. nuclear power revival

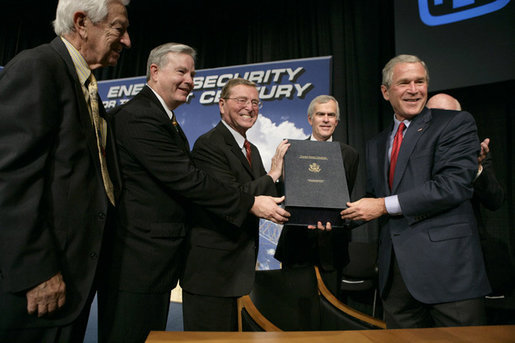
George W. Bush signing the Energy Policy Act of 2005, which offered incentives for US nuclear reactor construction including cost-overrun support up to a total of $2 billion for six new nuclear plants. Critics allege its primary purpose was to permit fossil fuel holding companies to monopolize utility generation.

Between 2007 and 2009, 13 companies applied to the Nuclear Regulatory Commission (NRC) for construction and operating licenses to build 31 new nuclear power reactors in the United States. However, the case for widespread nuclear plant construction has been hampered due to inexpensive natural gas, slow electricity demand growth in a weak US economy, lack of financing, and safety concerns following the Fukushima nuclear accident at a plant built in the early 1970s which occurred in 2011.

Most of the proposed 31 reactors have been canceled, and only two reactors were constructed at Vogtle Electric Generating Plant. In 2013, four reactors were permanently closed: San Onofre 2 and 3 in California following equipment problems, Crystal River 3 in Florida, and Kewaunee in Wisconsin. Vermont Yankee, in Vernon, was closed on December 29, 2014.

In March 2017, the last remaining U.S.-based new nuclear company, Westinghouse Electric Company, filed for Chapter 11 bankruptcy because of US$9 billion of losses from its U.S. nuclear construction projects. Later that year construction of two reactors of their AP1000 design at V.C. Summer was canceled due to delays and cost overruns.

As of 2021, the private sector focus has shifted toward the development of small modular reactors (SMRs), which could theoretically cut down on the high costs and lengthy construction times of conventional nuclear plants. As of March 2026, NuScale Power and TerraPower have been granted regulatory approval for electricity-generating SMR designs by the NRC, with TerraPower's Natrium Advanced Reactor becoming the first commercial non-light-water reactor to ever receive a construction permit from the NRC. Both Presidents Donald Trump and Joe Biden have proposed or helped pass legislation that would increase subsidies for new and existing nuclear plants.

== Overview ==
The Energy Policy Act of 2005 offered the nuclear power industry financial incentives and economic subsidies that, according to economist John Quiggin, the "developers of wind and solar power could only dream of". The Act provides substantial loan guarantees, cost-overrun support of up to $2 billion total for multiple new nuclear power plants, and the extension of the Price-Anderson Nuclear Industries Indemnity Act through to 2025. The Act was promoted as a forerunner to a "nuclear renaissance" in the United States, with dozens of new plants being announced.

Others saw the Act, which repealed the Public Utility Holding Company Act of 1935 (PUHCA), as an attempt by oil and gas interests to monopolize utility generation through deregulation. Former Federal Energy Regulatory Commission administrator Lynn Hargis noted in 2005 that "PUHCA prohibits the re-creation of the huge holding companies (the Power Trusts) that grew up in the 1920s and 1930s, when three utility holding companies owned nearly half of all the electric utilities in the country." She correctly predicted that repealing PUHCA would lead to "massive consolidation of utility ownership." Within one year of PUHCA's August 2005 repeal the spot price of natural gas had dropped by 26%, creating a financial incentive for utilities to abandon nuclear generation in favor of natural gas. Many license applications filed with the Nuclear Regulatory Commission for proposed new reactors were suspended or cancelled.

As of 2020, the plans for 31 new renaissance reactors in the United States have resulted in two reactors beginning construction, a third reactor being commissioned, and two additional reactors, Virgil C. Summers Units 2 and 3 in South Carolina, beginning construction before being canceled. Vogtle units 3 and 4 are the two new units and occupy an existing nuclear site. The other construction likewise occupies an existing site at Watts Bar, but had been 80% built from 1973 to 1985, with the final 20% occurring from 2007 to 2015. Matthew Wald from the New York Times has reported that "the nuclear renaissance is looking small and slow".

In 2008, the Energy Information Administration projected almost 17 gigawatts of new nuclear power reactors by 2030, but in its 2011 projections, it "scaled back the 2030 projection to just five". A survey conducted in April 2011 found that 64 percent of Americans opposed the construction of new nuclear reactors. Yet five months later a survey sponsored by the Nuclear Energy Institute found that "62 percent of respondents said they favor the use of nuclear energy as one of the ways to provide electricity in the United States, with 35 percent opposed".

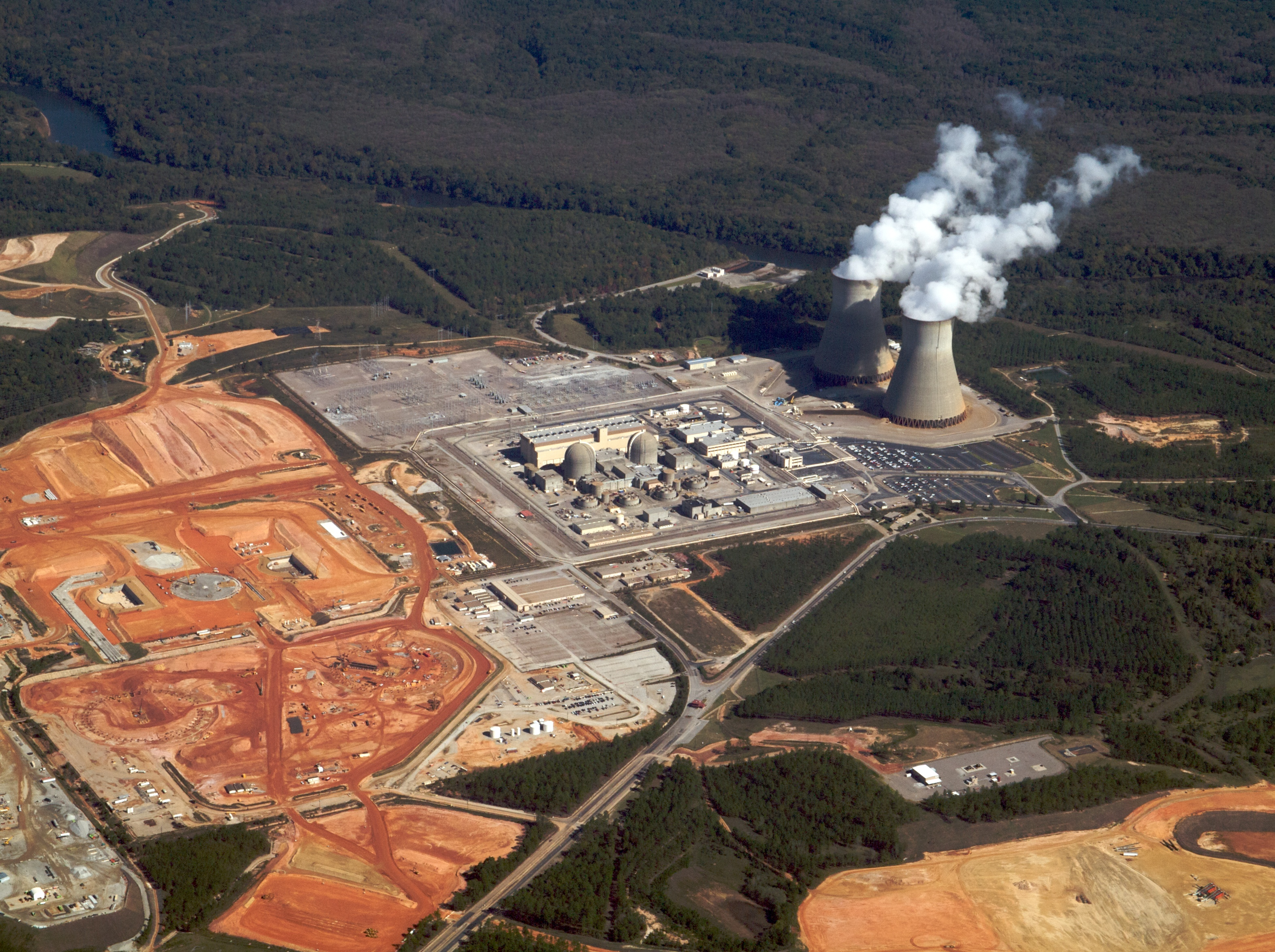
Construction of two Westinghouse AP1000 reactors underway at Vogtle Electric in 2011

As of December 2011, construction by Southern Company on two new nuclear units (Vogtle 3 & 4) has begun, and they are expected to be delivering commercial power by 2016 and 2017. In the wake of Fukushima, experts at the time saw continuing challenges that they felt would make it difficult for the nuclear power industry to expand beyond a small handful of reactor projects that "government agencies decide to subsidize by forcing taxpayers to assume the risk for the reactors and mandating that ratepayers pay for construction in advance".

As of 2014, the U.S. nuclear industry began a new lobbying effort, hiring three former senators—Evan Bayh, a Democrat; Judd Gregg, a Republican; and Spencer Abraham, a Republican—as well as William M. Daley, a former staffer to President Obama. The initiative is called Nuclear Matters, and it has begun a newspaper advertising campaign.

As of October 2024 locations of new US reactors and their operating dates are:

- Georgia, Vogtle Electric Unit 3 July 31, 2023, and Unit 4 April 29, 2024

On March 29, 2017, parent company Toshiba placed Westinghouse Electric Company in Chapter 11 bankruptcy because of $9 billion of losses from its nuclear reactor construction projects. The projects responsible for this loss are mostly the construction of four AP1000 reactors at Vogtle in Georgia and V. C. Summer in South Carolina. The U.S. government had given $8.3 billion of loan guarantees on the financing of the four nuclear reactors being built in the U.S., and it is expected a way forward to completing the plant can be agreed. Peter A. Bradford, former Nuclear Regulatory Commission member, commented "They placed a big bet on this hallucination of a nuclear renaissance". The National Review characterised the U.S. nuclear industry as being in "deep crisis".

As of 2017, the U.S. shale gas boom has lowered electricity generation costs placing severe pressure on the economics of operating older existing nuclear power plants. The Nuclear Energy Institute has estimated that 15 to 20 reactors are at risk of early closure for economic reasons. Nuclear operators in Illinois and New York have obtained financial support from regulators, and operators in Connecticut, New Jersey, Ohio and Pennsylvania are seeking similar support.

A 2017 assessment put rising nuclear construction costs, low gas prices and improving renewable generation economics as the three main causes of the failure of the nuclear renaissance in the United States.

In 2019, former Department of Energy Deputy Secretary, Daniel Poneman, released a book on nuclear power discussing the need for an “all-of-the-above” energy policy that advances the goal of decarbonizing the environment through all available means, specifically, nuclear power. Poneman argues that the United States should work to enhance the ability of nuclear power to combat climate change even as we reduce the risks of nuclear terror. Others, including James Hansen, Bret Kugelmass, and Joshua S. Goldstein, have echoed those points. According to the International Energy Agency (IEA), low-carbon energy sources must account for 85% of global electricity generation by 2040 (up from 36% in 2019) to stave off the worst effects of climate change. IEA advocates for nuclear energy as the most feasible option for meeting that goal. The Washington, D.C.–based research institute, Energy Impact Center, has set the goal of completely decarbonizing the global economy by 2040 using primarily nuclear energy. The center is also responsible for the nuclear energy- and climate-related podcast, Titans of Nuclear.

This renewed interest in nuclear power as a climate change mitigation tool has led to efforts aimed at speeding up construction time and reducing costs of power plants. In 2020, the Department of Energy awarded $80 million each to TerraPower and X-energy as part of its Advanced Reactor Demonstration Program. Both companies are developing small modular reactor (SMR) projects which are theoretically easier and more inexpensive to build than traditional plants. Similarly, the Energy Impact Center developed OPEN100, another SMR project introduced in 2020 that has published open-source blueprints for the design and construction of a nuclear power plant with a pressurized water reactor. As of 2023, the only company that had been granted regulatory approval from the NRC for its SMR design was NuScale Power, but in November 2023 its first deployment project, the Carbon Free Power Project in Idaho, was cancelled because of cost increases leading to some of its members withdrawing. This raised concerns about the commercial prospects in the U.S. of the other SMR designs. However, in March 2026, the NRC issued a construction permit for TerraPower's Natrium Advanced Reactor in Kemmerer, Wyoming, the first construction permit it had ever granted for a commercial non-light-water power reactor.

== Detailed history ==
Nuclear power has proved controversial since the 1970s. Highly radioactive materials may overheat and escape from the reactor building. Toxic, radioactive waste (spent nuclear fuel) needs to be regularly removed from the reactors and disposed of safely for up to a million years, so that it does not pollute the environment. Recycling of nuclear waste has been discussed, but it creates plutonium which can be used in weapons, and in any case still leaves much unwanted waste to be stored and disposed of. Large, purpose-built facilities for long-term disposal of nuclear waste have been difficult to site, and have not yet reached fruition. Specific controversies, and projects which have not proceeded according to plan, include:

- Proposed plans to add a new reactor to the North Anna Nuclear Generating Station have overall received more support than opposition, but have also brought public protest. On August 7, 2008, six activists from the Peoples Alliance for Clean Energy were arrested at the North Anna Information Center for trespassing.
- In August 2009, the Tennessee Valley Authority, faced with "falling electric sales and rising costs from cleaning up a massive coal ash spill in Tennessee", trimmed plans for the potential four-unit Bellefonte nuclear plant to one reactor.
- As of September 2010, ground has been broken the Vogtle project and one other reactor in South Carolina. Two other reactors in Texas, four in Florida and one in Missouri have all been "moved to the back burner, mostly because of uncertain economics".
- On October 8, 2010, Constellation Energy Vice President and CEO Michael J. Wallace informed the US Department of Energy that it was abandoning its partnership with Electricite de France (EDF) to build the Calvert Cliffs No. 3 nuclear plant due primarily to the high cost and "burdensome conditions" that the loan guarantee conditions, which the United States government would place on the project. Wallace, in his letter, stated that any next steps in the further pursuit of the loan guarantee and the overall project were "for EDF to determine".
- On October 29, 2010, Dominion president Tom Farrell told investors that Dominion had decided to slow its development of a proposed third reactor at North Anna Nuclear Generating Station and wait until the combined construction permit-operating license (COL) was approved by the NRC before deciding to complete the project. This approval is expected in early 2013.
- Generation III reactors are safer than older reactors like the GE MAC 1 at Fukushima, Vermont Yankee and other plants around the world. But after a decade in which the federal government policy promoted this new version of nuclear power, only one Generation III+ reactor project has been approved in the United States. Work on it has just begun in Georgia, and already "there are conflicts between the utility, Southern Company and the Nuclear Regulatory Commission". Moreover, this project is going forward only because it is in one of the few regions of the United States (the Southeast) where electricity markets were not deregulated. That means "the utility, operating on cost-plus basis, can pass on to rate-payers all its expense over-runs".
- Following the March 2011 Fukushima Daiichi nuclear accident, NRG Energy has decided to abandon already started construction on two new nuclear power plants in Texas. Analysts attributed the abandonment of the South Texas Nuclear Generating Station project to the financial situation of the plant-partner TEPCO, the inability to raise other construction financing, the current low cost of electricity in Texas, and expected additional permitting delays. NRG has written off its investment of $331 million in the project.
- A survey conducted in April 2011 found that 64 percent of Americans opposed the construction of new nuclear reactors. A survey sponsored by the Nuclear Energy Institute, conducted in September 2011, found that "62 percent of respondents said they favor the use of nuclear energy as one of the ways to provide electricity in the United States, with 35 percent opposed".
- As of January 2012, Progress Energy plans to cancel the main development and construction contract for its proposed Levy County Nuclear Power Plant, and documents show that the utility won't bring the plant online until at least 2027—if at all. But if the state continues to allow the utility to collect money for the project, customers will have to keep paying the so-called advance fee for years.
- The Victoria County Station was a proposed two-unit nuclear power plant, in Victoria County, Texas, until the project was canceled in August 2012. Exelon had previously bought John Deere Renewables and is moving into wind power.
- In 2013, four aging reactors were permanently closed: San Onofre 2 and 3 in California, Crystal River 3 in Florida, and Kewaunee in Wisconsin. The state of Vermont is trying to close Vermont Yankee, in Vernon.
- On November 3, 2013, climate scientists Ken Caldeira, Kerry Emanuel, James Hansen, and Tom Wigley wrote an open letter "to those influencing environmental policy but opposed to nuclear power", arguing "there is no credible path to climate stabilization that does not include a substantial role for nuclear power."
- In March 2013, the construction of the reactors Virgil C. Summer 2 and Vogtle 3 had begun, following the start of the construction of Virgil C. Summer 3 and Vogtle 4 in November 2013
- In June 2013, the documentary film Pandora's Promise is released with a central argument that "nuclear power..is a relatively safe and clean energy source which can help mitigate the serious problem of anthropogenic global warming".
- As of July 2013, economist Mark Cooper (academic) has identified some US nuclear power plants that face particularly significant challenges to their continued operation. These are Palisades, Fort Calhoun, Nine Mile Point, Fitzpatrick, Ginna, Oyster Creek, Vermont Yankee, Millstone, Clinton, Indian Point. Cooper says the lesson here for policy makers and economists is clear: "nuclear reactors are simply not competitive".
- On August 1, 2013, as part of a comprehensive settlement with Florida consumers, Duke Energy announced termination of the engineering, procurement and construction (EPC) agreement for the Levy County Nuclear Power Plant project. Research published in May 2013 by The Tampa Bay Times showed that a plant fueled by natural gas was nearly certain to be cheaper than a nuclear-fueled plant over the next 6 decades. About $1 billion had been spent on the preparatory work for the Levy nuclear project.
- Unistar Nuclear announced in late 2008 that it had notified the U.S. Nuclear Regulatory Commission (NRC) of its plan to submit a combined construction and operating licence (COL) application for an Evolutionary Power Reactor (EPR) at Constellation Energy's Nine Mile Point site. Less than a year later however, Unistar requested a temporary suspension of the application review, and in 2013, citing a lack of federal loan guarantees, withdrew the application completely.
- On December 29, 2014, Vermont Yankee Nuclear Power Plant in Vernon, VT was permanently shut down.
- In March 2015, a Gallup poll showed that a majority (51%) of Americans supported nuclear power.
- In May 2015, the NRC approved a construction permission for a third reactor at Enrico Fermi Nuclear Generating Station. Exelon announced that there were no construction plans by that time.
- In October 2015, the Nuclear Regulatory Commission granted an operating license for Watts Bar Nuclear Generating Station Unit 2, it started commercial operation in October 2016. The unit will lower Tennessee Valley Authority's CO_{2} emissions by between six and eight million tons annually. Unit 2 has an expected service lifetime of 60 years. At 90% capacity factor, it will generate 700 billion kilowatthours of electricity at a projected cost of 6¢/kWh.
- In November 2015, the Obama administration announced actions "to ensure that nuclear energy remains a vibrant component of the United States’ clean energy strategy", including:
  - establishment of The Gateway for Accelerated Innovation (GAIN), "to provide the nuclear energy community with access to the technical, regulatory, and financial support necessary to move new or advanced nuclear reactor designs"
  - the Second Advanced Non-Light Water Reactors Workshops would be held by the United States Department of Energy and the Nuclear Regulatory Commission in June 2016
  - supplementation of the Dept. of Energy's $12.5 billion in loan guarantees available to support innovative nuclear energy projects
  - establishment of the Light Water Reactor (LWR) Research, Development, and Deployment (RDD) Working Group
  - an agreement with NuScale Power to establish new cost-shared modeling and simulation tools
- The cancellation of the Virgil C. Summer AP1000 nuclear plant, and the subsequent business failures, caused a political and legal scandal in South Carolina. The South Carolina Public Service Authority suffered considerable losses. The stock of SCANA, the only Fortune 500 company based in South Carolina, dramatically fell, leading to its merger with Dominion Energy in 2019. In 2020 the former CEO and the former vice president of SCANA pleaded guilty to multiple fraud related charges, centering around their efforts to hide the construction delays from shareholders and regulators. Both men were also indicted by the U.S. Securities and Exchange Commission for securities fraud. About 720,000 electric ratepayers would have to pay another $2.3 billion of sunk project costs into the future, on top of the about $2 billion past higher power bills.
- On March 6, 2023, Vogtle Unit 3 in Burke County, Georgia reached criticality for the first time, and it began commercial power generation on July 31, 2023.
- On February 14, 2024, Vogtle Unit 4 reached criticality for the first time, and it began commercial power generation on April 29, 2024.

== See also ==
- Nuclear renaissance
- Blue Ribbon Commission on America's Nuclear Future
- Economics of new nuclear power plants
- Generation III reactor
- Pandora's Promise
- Nuclear power in the United States
- List of cancelled nuclear plants in the United States
- Nuclear Power 2010 Program
