= Last Energy =

American nuclear energy company

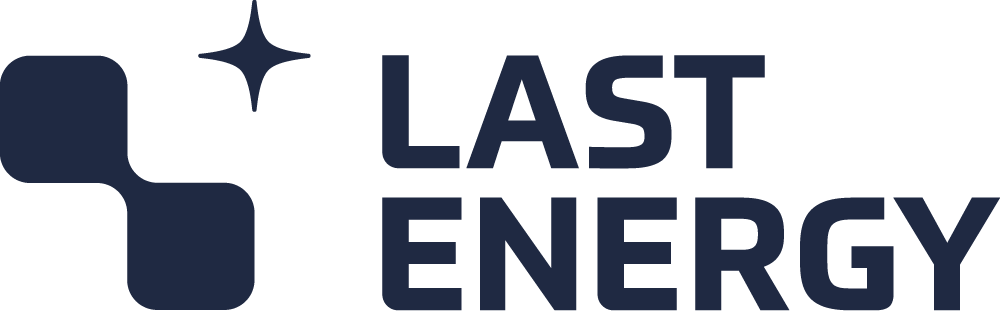
- Company type: Private
- Industry: Nuclear energy
- Founded: 2019
- Founder: Bret Kugelmass
- Headquarters: Washington, D.C., U.S.
- Products: PWR-20
- Website: https://www.lastenergy.com/

Last Energy is an American commercial developer of micro-modular nuclear power plants, established in 2019 by Bret Kugelmass as the commercial spinoff of the Energy Impact Center, an American clean energy research institute.

Last Energy plans to build nuclear microreactor 20 MWe power plants and provide full-service project development, including plant design, construction, financing, operations, and decommissioning. The company’s power plant, the PWR-20, a type of small modular reactor, consists of a few dozen rectangular modules that are factory-made and produces 20 MW of electricity through a pressurized water reactor. As a full-service developer, Last Energy oversees all phases of plant development and management. Last Energy’s goal is to reduce the time and costs of nuclear development in order to decarbonize energy production and dramatically increase access to clean, affordable power. The company is based in Washington, D.C. and has European subsidiaries in Romania, Poland and the UK.

== History ==
In 2017, Bret Kugelmass created the Energy Impact Center (EIC) and began conducting interviews with experts in nuclear energy and related fields for a podcast called Titans of Nuclear. The podcast debuted in January 2018. During this period, Kugelmass concluded the primary reason new nuclear development had stalled was due to construction delays and cost overruns posed by traditional nuclear projects.

In 2019, the Center introduced the Nuclear Energy Grand Challenge, a prize competition that asked university students to develop business proposals for mitigating the cost, duration, and risks of power plant construction and maintenance. Later that year, Kugelmass founded Last Energy as a commercial twin to the Center.

In February 2020, the EIC introduced OPEN100, an open-source platform that aims to ease the design and construction process of nuclear power plants by providing freely-available blueprints. Its stated goal is to reduce the cost and duration of nuclear reactor construction and increase the nuclear power supply 100-fold by 2040 to aid in the decarbonization of the global economy. Last Energy subsequently received $20 million in Series A funding led by Gigafund in 2020.

In March 2022, Romanian Prime Minister Nicolae Ciucă announced Last Energy would conduct a demonstrator project in Romania with the Autonomous Directorate of Nuclear Energy Technologies (RATEN) in Mioveni. Ciucă also announced the possibility to scale the deployment of Last Energy’s reactor technology to contribute to Romania’s energy independence goal. This was announced in the wake of Russia invading Ukraine, which caused an energy crisis in Europe. In June, Last Energy signed an agreement with Enea Group, the fourth largest energy group in Poland. The agreement outlined the joint pursuit of the development of Last Energy’s 20 MWe microreactors in Poland, aiming to expand the country’s access to clean power and to achieve carbon neutrality in Poland by 2050. The agreement was signed at a public ceremony at Congress 590 in Warsaw with Polish Deputy Prime Minister Jacek Sasin, who also serves as Minister of State Assets. In July 2022, Last Energy announced an agreement with the Legnica Special Economic Zone (LSSE) in Legnica, in the Lower Silesian Voivodeship of southwest Poland. The agreement stated that Last Energy will develop ten microreactors in the LSSE to power industrial entities in the region.

Last Energy is also in talks with further potential commercial partners, regulators and governments in Europe, Latin America, and Asia.

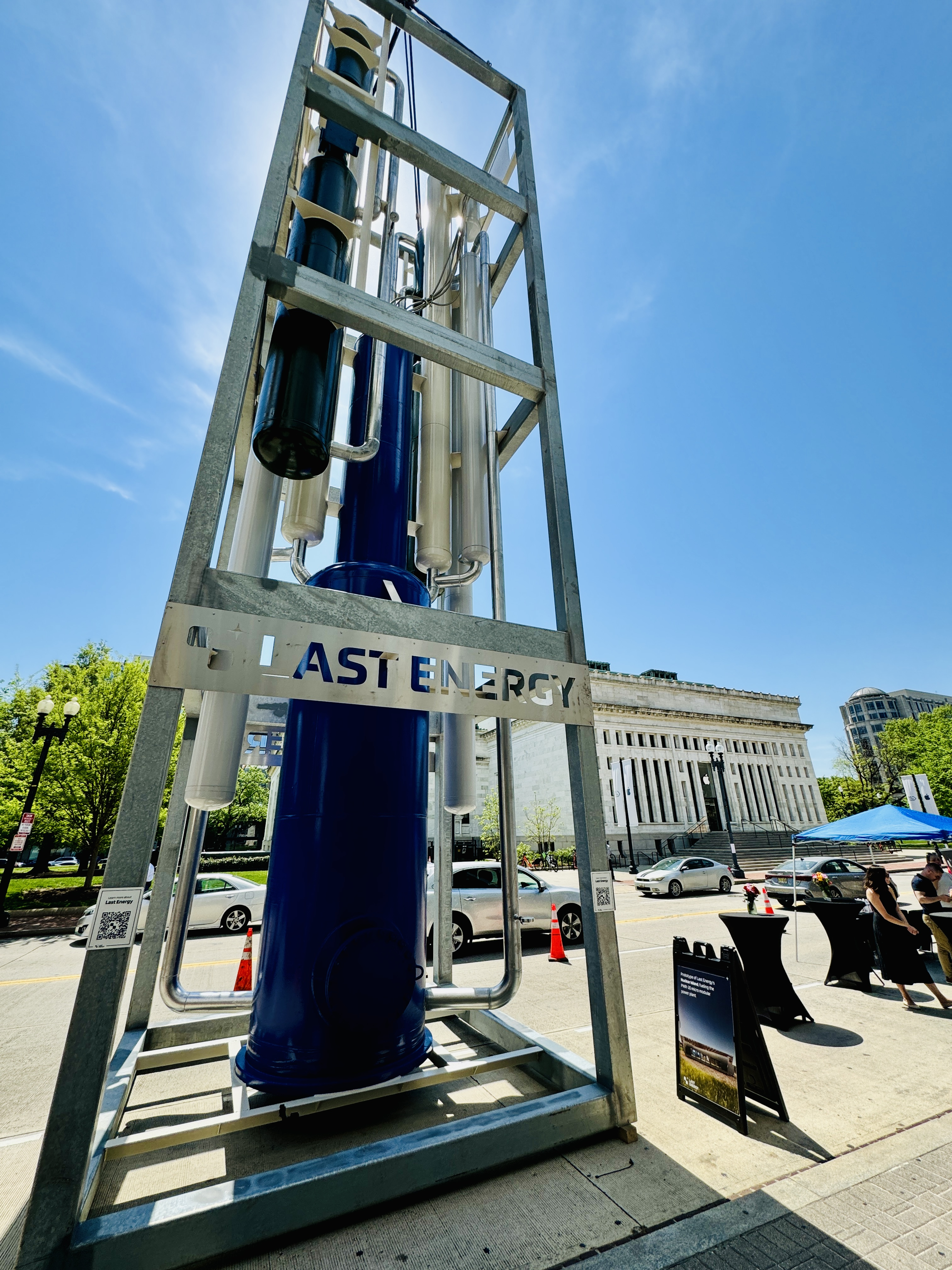
A demonstration model of Last Energy's reactor module displayed in Washington, D.C., in 2024.

In March 2023, Last Energy completed four deals worth $18.9 billion for 34 reactors in Europe. Kugelmass gave a speech at SXSW that month outlining how to reignite nuclear power by focusing on reducing the cost and timeline of construction. In October 2023, Last Energy showcased a prototype of its nuclear reactor module in Poland.

In March 2024, Last Energy displayed a prototype of its nuclear reactor module outside CERAWeek in Houston, Texas. In April 2024, the company held a similar demonstration event in downtown Washington, D.C. and invited executives from the data center industry. In April 2024, Kugelmass confirmed during a BBC interview that data centers made up approximately half of Last Energy's commercial agreements, which were for over 55 reactors at that point. In April 2024, Kugelmass was a featured speaker for SOSV's Earth Day + series.

In June 2024, Last Energy announced a research partnership with the NATO Energy Security Centre of Excellence to identify applications for micro-nuclear technologies on NATO military bases, in addition to exploring opportunities to deploy microreactors.

In August 2024, Last Energy announced that it had closed a $40 million Series B round earlier in the year, bringing total capital raised to $64 million since 2019.

In October 2024, the company announced plans to develop four microreactors on the vacant site of a decommissioned, coal-fired power plant, the Llynfi power station. The 80MW project is expected to create a capital investment of £300 million and will provide power to regional industrial customers in Bridgend in South Wales.

In October 2024, Last Energy's Project Quantum, which will provide power to data centers in Europe, was one of nine selected by the European Commission to advance to "Project Working Group" status under the European Industrial Alliance on Small Modular Reactors. Companies with this status receive project development a support to expand SMR deployment under the Alliance.

The United States Department of Energy (DOE) announced on October 29, 2024 that Oak Ridge National Laboratory would provide material characterization support to Last Energy under its IRA-funded clean energy technology acceleration program.

According to Reuters, in December 2024, the Export-Import Bank of the United States issued a letter of intent to Last Energy indicating a willingness to provide $103.7 million in debt financing for the delivery of its first microreactor in Wales.

The Office for Nuclear Regulation, the United Kingdom's nuclear industry regulator, admitted Last Energy's South Wales project into nuclear site licensing in February 2025. As World Nuclear News reported, this made the Last Energy project "the first new site for a commercial nuclear power reactor to enter licensing since the Torness Advanced Gas Cooled Reactor plant in Scotland in 1978."

In December 2025, Last Energy raised $100 million in an oversubscribed Series C funding round led by Astera Institute, with participation from Galaxy Interactive, Gigafund, and Woori Technology Investment Co.

== Design and construction ==
The company’s first product, the PWR-20, is a 20 MWe micro-modular nuclear power plant. The purpose of modular design is to ensure that all pieces of the power plant can be constructed in a factory, transported via trucks, and then delivered as a kit onsite with a "plug-in ready" electrical system.

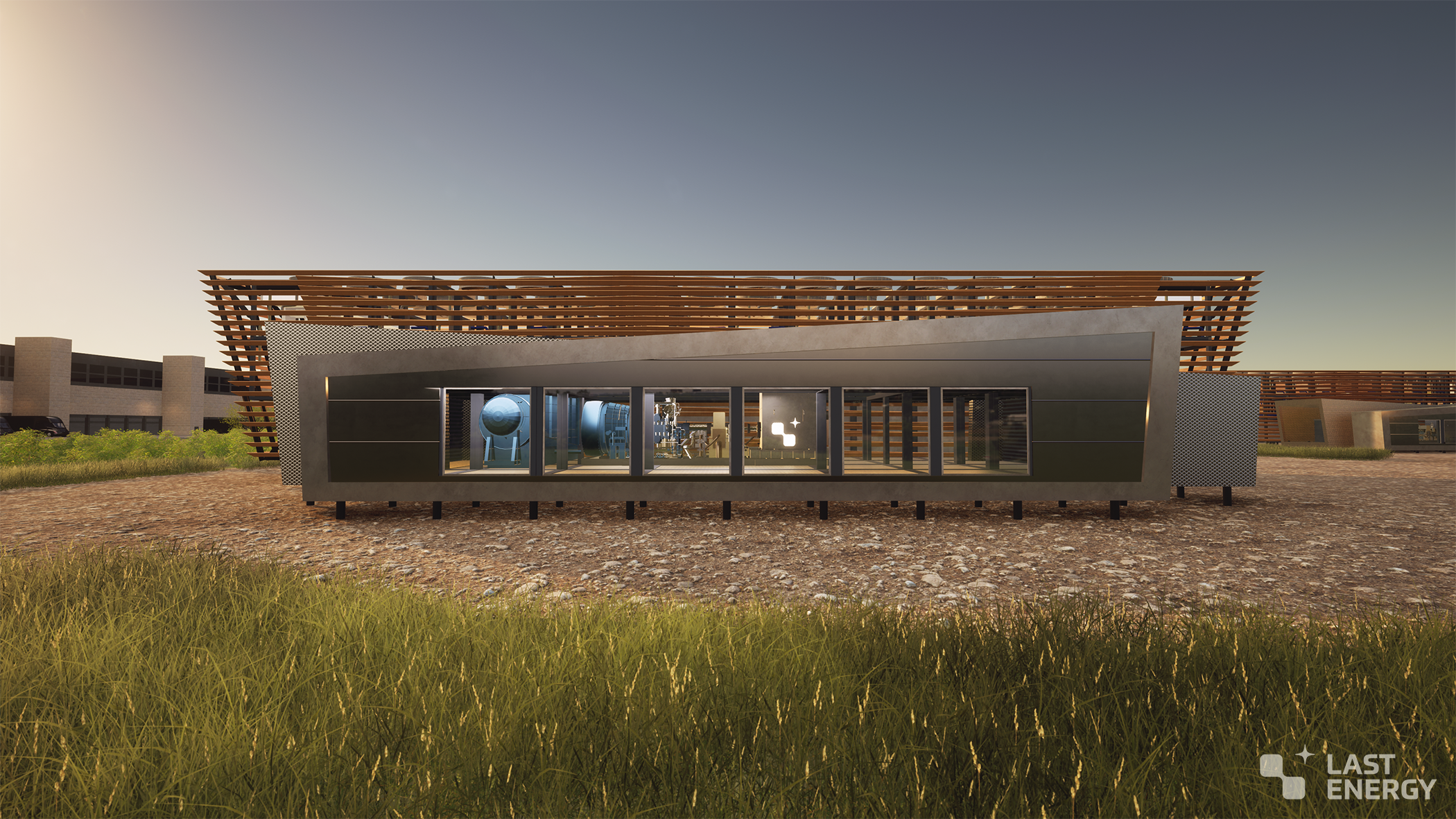
A rendering of Last Energy's PWR-20 plant

Using the same principles as the oil and gas industry, Last Energy's approach is meant to reduce the costs and timeline delivering a nuclear plant. The PWR-20 is sized to co-locate next to private sector industrial users such as manufacturers, steel mills, as well as data centers. One plan involves connecting microreactors to data centers via both private wires and the power grid. The company purposefully relies on off-the-shelf supply chains, and can deliver a plant within 24 months.

Once completed, the PWR-20 fits inside a football field. Unique among nuclear developers, Last Energy does not seek any government financing to develop its plants.

The PWR-20 employs a 20 MWe (80 MWth) single-loop pressurized water reactor that has a 300C continuous output. The design uses standard full-length pressurized water reactor fuel enriched to 4.95% and closed-cycle air cooling.

Due to its reliance on air cooling systems, the PWR-20 does not need to be sited near a water source and is tailored to serve dispersed energy users. Last Energy can deliver more than one unit to scale output to the customer's needs.
