= Energy independence =

Freedom from others regarding energy

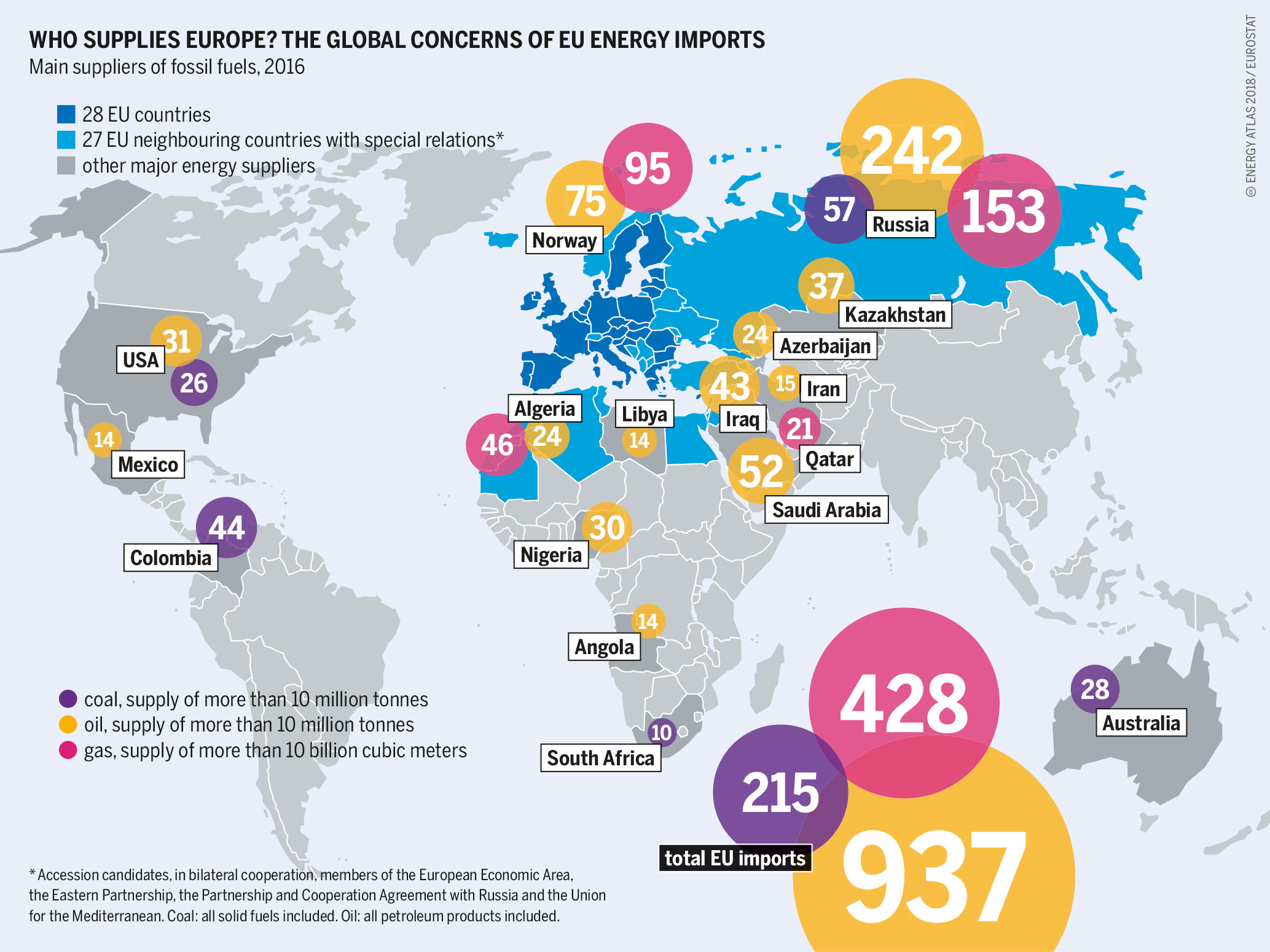
Energy Atlas 2018 "Who supplies Europe? The global concerns of EU energy imports"

Energy independence is the ability of a country to exercise independence or autarky over their energy resources, energy supply and/or energy generation by the energy industry.

Energy dependence, in general, refers to mankind's general dependence on either primary or secondary energy for energy consumption (fuel, transport, automation, etc.). In a narrower sense, it may describe the dependence of one country on energy resources from another country.

Energy dependency shows the extent to which an economy relies upon imports in order to meet its energy needs. The indicator is calculated as net imports divided by the sum of gross inland energy consumption plus bunkers.

— Eurostat

Energy dependence has been identified as one of several factors (energy sources diversification, energy suppliers diversification, energy sources fungibility, energy transport, market liquidity, energy resources, political stability, energy intensity, GDP) negatively contributing to energy security. Generally, a higher level of energy dependence is associated with higher risk, because of the possible interference of trade regulations, international armed conflicts, terrorist attacks, etc. However, achieving total energy independence is often impossible, particularly in the short term. Therefore, energy security strategies usually focus on 'risk reduction' rather than the complete elimination of import dependency.

== Techniques for energy independence ==
=== Renewable energy ===
A study found that transition from fossil fuels to renewable energy systems reduces risks from mining, trade and political dependence because renewable energy systems don't need fuel – they depend on trade only for the acquisition of materials and components during construction. Renewable energy is found to be an efficient way to ensure energy independence and security. It also supports the transition to a low carbon economy and society. Ways to manage the variability of renewable energy – such as little solar power on cloudy days – include dispatchable generation and smart grids. Bioenergy hydropower and hydrogen energy could be used for such purposes alongside storage-options like batteries.

=== Nuclear power ===
Several countries are conducting extensive research and development programs around renewable energy sources like solar, wind, water, and nuclear energy in hopes to achieve energy independence. However, because solar, wind, and water cannot always be derived as an energy source, nuclear energy is seen as a near-universal alternative that is efficient, safe, and combats the climate crisis.

Under the conceived notion that the expansion of and investment in nuclear energy power plants is a key step in the goal of achieving energy independence many countries, and companies, are supporting nuclear power research efforts.

The International Thermonuclear Experimental Reactor (ITER), located in France, is an experimental tokamak nuclear fusion reactor that is a collaboration between 35 countries. This project was launched in 2007 and still under construction today.

In 2020, the U.S. Department of Energy awarded $160 million in initial funding to TerraPower and X-energy to build advanced nuclear reactors that will be affordable to construct and operate. Both companies are expected to produce their product within 7 years.

In that same tone, there are several other companies and institutions across the globe that are gaining attention from their nuclear power innovations and research efforts. Commonwealth Fusion Systems, founded in 2018, is focusing on the development of nuclear fusion. In 2020, The Energy Impact Center launched its OPEN100 project, the world's first open-source blueprint for the design, construction, and financing of nuclear power plants. General Fusion is a Canadian company currently developing a fusion power device, based on magnetized target fusion. Flibe Energy aims to tackle the future of nuclear energy by researching and developing the liquid fluoride thorium reactor (LFTR).

In addition, safe and cost-effective storage of nuclear waste in the Waste Isolation Pilot Plant and full version of this underground storage in New Mexico is important for the nuclear fuel cycle.

== Global examples ==
Energy independence is being attempted by large or resource-rich and economically strong countries like the United States, Russia, China and the Near and Middle East, but it is so far an idealized status that at present can be only approximated by non-sustainable exploitation of a country's (non-renewable) natural resources. Another factor in reducing dependence is the addition of renewable energy sources to the energy mix. Usually, a country relies on local and global energy renewable and non-renewable resources, a mixed-model solution that presumes various energy sources and modes of energy transfer between countries like electric power transmission, oil transport (oil and gas pipelines and tankers), etc. The European dependence on Russian energy is a good example because Russia is Europe's main supplier of hard coal, crude oil, and natural gas. Oil wars in and between the Middle East, Russia, and the United States that have made markets unpredictable and volatile are also a great example as to why energy advocates and experts suggest countries invest in energy independence. The international dependence of energy resources exposes countries to vulnerability in every aspect of life — countries rely on energy for food, infrastructure, security, transportation, and more.

== See also ==
=== Related concepts ===
- Efficient energy use
- Energy development
- Energy policy
- Energy resilience
- Energy security

=== National efforts ===
- Energy policy of Turkey
- India's three-stage nuclear power programme
- Making Sweden an Oil-Free Society
- Phase-out of fossil fuel vehicles
- United States energy independence
