= Legnica Special Economic Zone =

Legnica Special Economic Zone is a special economic zone in Poland, situated in Lower Silesian Voivodeship in the southwest of the country. Cited by the Polish Investment and Trade Agency as "one of the most dynamically developing regions in Poland", it lies near the border with Germany and the Czech Republic and comprises an area which includes the cities of Chojnow, Glogow, Legnica, Lubin, Zgorzelec, Zlotoryja and the communes of Chojnow, Gromadka, Iłowa, Kostomloty, Legnickie Pole, Miekinia, Milkowice, Polkowice, Prochowice, Prochowice, Przemkow, Radwanice, and Sroda Slaska.

== History ==
The zone was established in 1997. New legal regulations introduced in 2018 allow for entrepreneurs working in the zone to be exempt from income tax in all of Poland. The 52-hectare (130-acre) Iłowa Subzone of the zone was established in Iłowa in December 2007. The Chinese technology company Lenovo had intended to open a factory in the zone in the summer of 2008, but the plans were later scrapped.

The zone has a special interest in clean energy and has made numerous agreements with companies which advocate or are involved with clean energy to help meet Poland meet its carbon objectives for 2050. In 2022 a cooperation agreement was made with SatRev, a Polish space company, which uses 100% of its energy from renewable energy sources. They agreed to manufacture nanosatellites in a new factory to be built in Legnica, with the objective of forming a constellation of a thousand Earth Observation satellites by 2026. In July 2022, the zone signed an agreement with American nuclear energy company Last Energy to develop 10 small modular reactors in the LSSE. Construction work is underway in Sroda Slaska with a PepsiCo plant. In July 2022, the Viessmann Group, a manufacturer of heating systems and components, announced the construction of a new production plant on a 17-hectare (42-acre) plot of land in Legnica, in a ceremony which was attended by Prime Minister Mateusz Morawiecki. The new plant will create up to 3000 jobs.

As of 2022, Legica Special Economic Zone had 77 investors globally, including Volkswagen Motor Polska, Brose Sitech, Winkelmann and BASF, and had created over 17,000 jobs in Poland. According to Benchmarkia, Legica Special Economic Zone is ranked among the top 30 industrial parks based on total investment.
