= Motyle =

Motyle may refer to:

- Motyle, Lower Silesian Voivodeship in Gmina Gromadka, Bolesławiec County in Lower Silesian Voivodeship, SW Poland
- Motyle (film) (Butterflies), a 1972 Polish feature film directed by Janusz Nasfeter
