= Patoka =

Patoka may refer to:

in New Zealand

- Patoka, New Zealand, rural community in the Hawke's Bay Region

in Poland

- Patoka, Lower Silesian Voivodeship (south-west Poland)
- Patoka, Pomeranian Voivodeship (north Poland)

in the United States

- Patoka, Illinois, a village in Marion County
- Patoka, Indiana, a town in Gibson County
- Patoka Lake, a reservoir in Indiana
- Patoka Township (disambiguation)
- Patoka River, in Indiana
- USS Patoka (AO-9), a US Navy ship
- USCGC Patoka (WLR-75408), a US Coast Guard 75′ Gasconade class river buoy tender (WLR)
