= Patočka =

Patočka (feminine: Patočková) is a Czech surname. Notable people with the surname include:

- Barbora Patočková (born 1998), Czech ice hockey player
- František Patočka (1904–1985), Czech microbiologist and serologist
- Jan Patočka (1907–1977), Czech philosopher and dissident
- Jürgen Patocka (born 1977), Austrian footballer
- Libuše Patočková (1933–2010), Czech cross-country skier

== See also ==
- Patoka (disambiguation)
