= Gmina Gromadka =

Gmina Gromadka Gromadka Commune
- Gmina
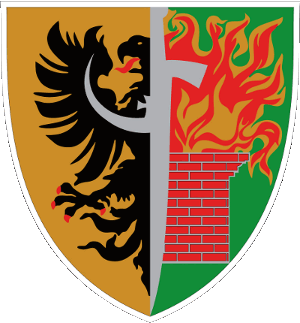
- Coat of arms
- Interactive map of Gmina Gromadka
- Coordinates (Gromadka): 51°21′36″N 15°45′32″E
- Country: Poland
- Voivodeship: Lower Silesian
- County: Bolesławiec
- Seat: Gromadka
- Sołectwos: Borówki, Gromadka, Krzyżowa, Modła, Motyle, Nowa Kuźnia, Osła, Pasternik, Patoka, Różyniec, Wierzbowa

Area
  - Total: 267.29 km^{2} (103.20 sq mi)

Population (2019-06-30)
  - Total: 5,355
  - Density: 20.03/km^{2} (51.89/sq mi)
- Website: http://www.gromadka.pl

Gmina Gromadka is a rural gmina (administrative district) in Bolesławiec County, Lower Silesian Voivodeship, in southwestern Poland. Its seat is the village of Gromadka, which lies approximately 17 kilometres (11 mi) north-east of Bolesławiec and 93 kilometres (58 mi) west of the regional capital Wrocław.

The gmina covers an area of 267.3 square kilometres (103.2 sq mi), and as of 2019 its total population is 5,355.

== Neighbouring gminas ==
Gmina Gromadka is bordered by the gminas of Bolesławiec, Chocianów, Chojnów, Przemków, Szprotawa and Warta Bolesławiecka.

== Villages ==
The gmina contains the villages of Borówki, Gromadka, Krzyżowa, Modła, Motyle, Nowa Kuźnia, Osła, Pasternik, Patoka, Różyniec and Wierzbowa.
