= Bibran-Modlau =

17th-century noble family of central Europe

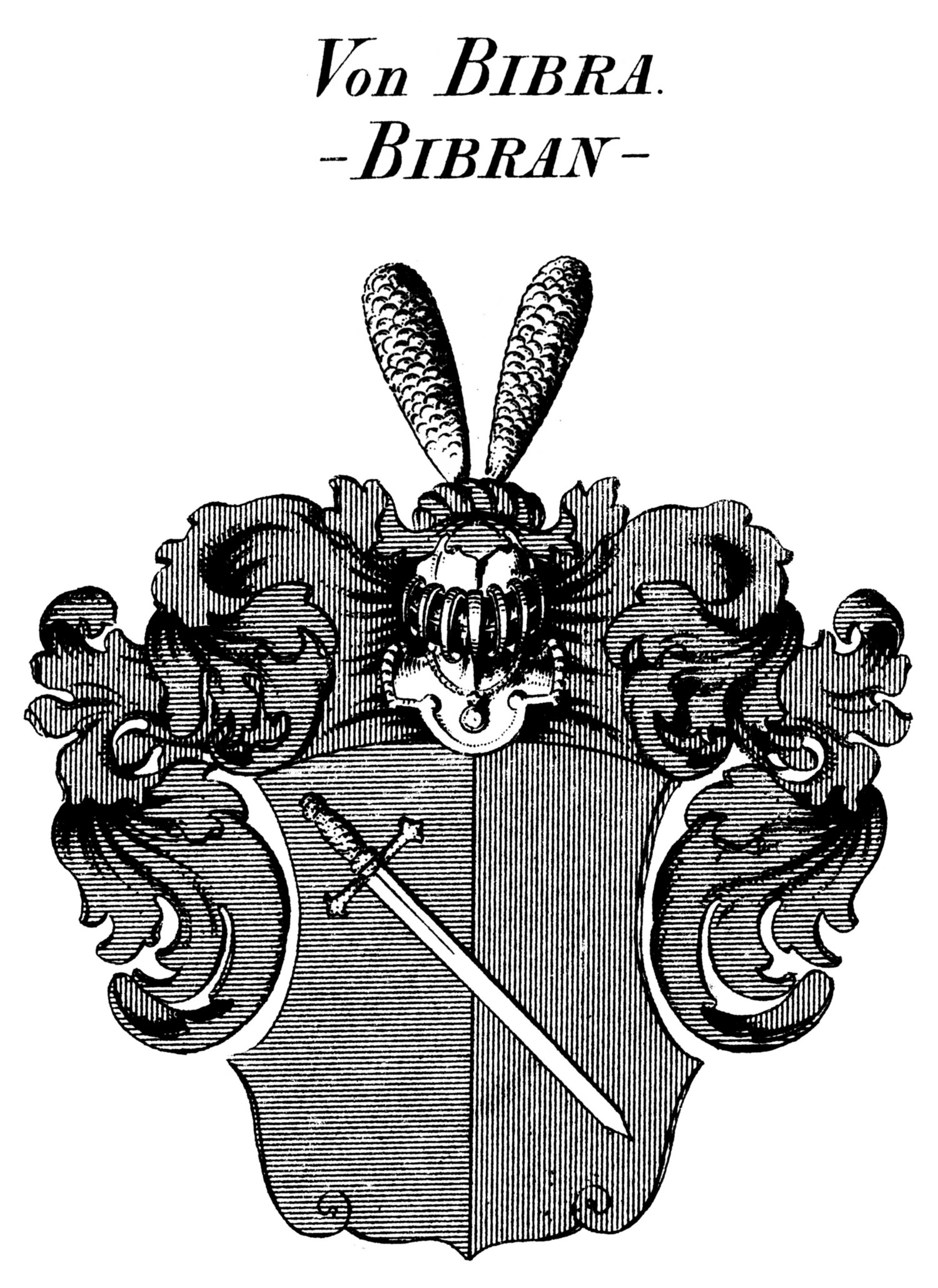
Coat of arms of the v. Bibran family

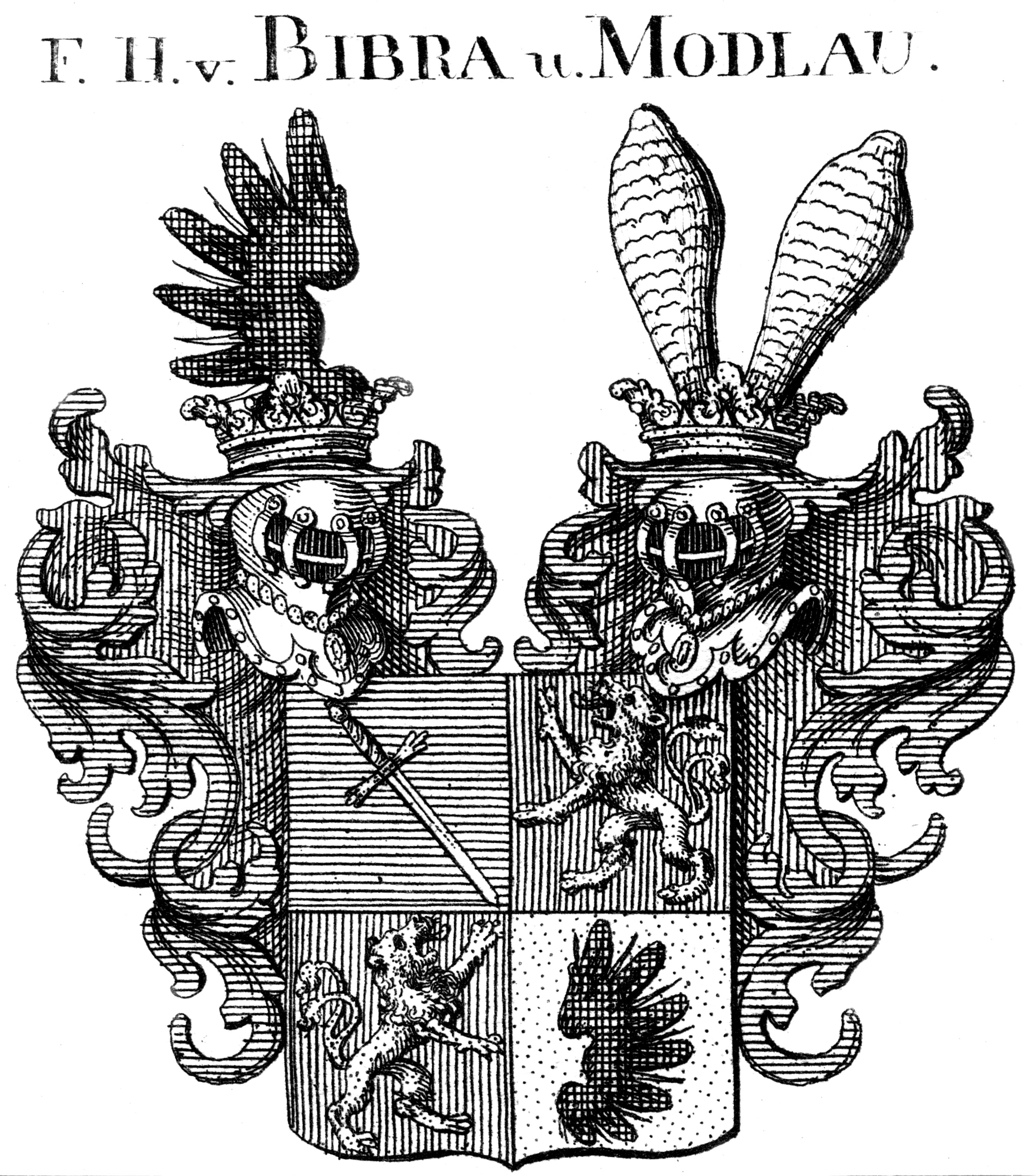
Coat of arms of F.H. v. Bibra(n)-Modlau

The Bibran-Modlau family (Bibran, Bibra und Modlau, Bibra-Modlau) was a Silesian noble family which was raised to Reichsfreiherr (Imperial barons) 1624.

One source (Origines familiae Bibranorum in Francia orientali utraque Silesia et Lusatia ...) reports that the family descends from a Sigmund von Bibra (Franconian Bibra family) who traveled to Silesia in the 11th century, however the different coat of arms casts doubt on the connection. The description with the published (c. 1860) print of Schloss Modlau describes the Bibran family as having split off from the Franconia Bibras five hundred years ago.

The family appears for the first time with Sigmund von Bibra, who apparently followed Agnes von Babenberg, granddaughter of Emperor Henry IV and bride Duke Władysław II had come to Silesia from Franconia. The family was divided into the Modlau line in the Bunzlau district, Profen in the Jauer district and Kittlitz-Treben-Woitsdorf in the Bunzlau district and Goldberg-Haynau. By 1480 Modlau and Profen were already in possession of the family. At the end of the family, it was centered at Reisicht and Modlau, in present-day Poland. Prominent members of the family were: Friedrich Heinrich von Bibran-Modlau, Abraham von Bibran Kittlitztreben und Woitsdorf, and Sigismund Heinrich von Bibran-Modlau († 1693) who was one of the largest land owner in Silesia.

== Modlau Line ==
- Nikolaus von Bibran zu Modlau († after 1510); ⚭ NN von Krommenau
  - George von Bibran zu Modlau, Wolfshayn, Kosel, Thomaswalde; ⚭ NN von Hock und Thomaswalde
    - Nikolaus von Bibran auf Modlau, Elder of the Principality of Jauer (1573–1600); ⚭ Eva von Schkopp
      - Heinrich Freiherr von Bibran, Lord of Modlau, imperial. councilor, chamberlain and provincial governor (1597–1642); ⚭ Helena von Stosch zu Klein-Kotzen und Kreidelwitz
        - Eva Eleonora von Bibran; 1.⚭ Sigsmund Freiherr von Klein-Lignitz († 1664); 2.⚭ Johann Heinrich Freiherr von Malzhan
        - Nikolaus Alexander Freiherr von Bibran und Modlau, (1626–1680); 1.⚭ Maria Elisabeth von Kühnheim auf Nippern und Guckerwitz; 2.⚭ Anna Hedwig von Tschammer auf Dase; 3.⚭ Ursula Helena von Pitzelwitz auf Machwitz
          - Heinrich Alexander Freiherr von Bibran (1656–1695); ⚭ Susanna Elisabeth Freiin von Schleepusch auf Groß-Polwitz und Heidenberg
            - Friedrich Heinrich Freiherr von Bibran und Modlau; 1.⚭ Johanna Margaretha von Sack auf Lubichen († 1710); 2.⚭ Maria Elisabeth Freiin von Schweinitz auf Seifersdorf († 1721); 3.⚭ Charlotta Helena Freiin von Beeß und Cölln
          - Friedrich Wilhelm Freiherr von Bibran (1674–1705); ⚭ Ursula Catharina Freiin von Stosch auf Gräditz
        - Johann Georg Freiherr von Bibran auf Reisicht (1628–1682)
        - Friedrich Freiherr von Bibran auf Modlau († 1708)
        - Hiob Heinrich Freiherr von Bibran auf Giesmannsdorf (1635–1689)
        - Sigismund Heinrich Freiherr von Bibran und Modlau (1640–1693); ⚭ Maria Catharina von Czettritz auf Waldenburg († 1718)
          - Sigismund Freiherr von Bibran und Modlau († 1696)
          - Alexandrina Rosina Freiin von Bibran und Modlau; ⚭ Anselm Graf von Promnitz und Pforten
          - Benjamin Freiherr von Bibran und Modlau, chamerlain of the English king (* 1692); ⚭ NN Freiin von Löwendal und Elsterwerda
          - Helena Freiin von Bibran und Modlau († after 1714); ⚭ Friedrich Wilhelm von Kannenberg
          - Henrietta Catharina Freiin von Bibran und Modlau (1680-1748); ⚭ Christoph Friedrich Reichsgraf von Stolberg
      - Barbara von Bibran; ⚭ Christoph von Haugwitz zu Töppendorf
      - Eva von Bibran; ⚭ Sigismund von Nostitz zu Lasan
      - Anna Maria von Bibran; ⚭ Conrad von Hohnberg zu Rohnstock und Leuthen
      - Friedrich von Bibran und Modlau auf Reisicht, Tammendorf, Wittgendorf, Tschirbsdorf und Jakobsdorf, Council of the Principality of Liegnitz; ⚭ NN von Hohberg
        - Anna Helena von Bibran († 1642); ⚭ Joachim von Niemitz und Jungferndorf
    - Seifried von Bibran zu Wolfshayn
    - Kaspar von Bibran zu Kosel und Altenoelse
    - Christoph von Bibran zu Thomaswalde
    - Heinrich von Bibran zu Heinzebortschen
    - Elisabeth von Bibran († 1573); ⚭ Peter von Faust zu Schönfeld

== Wolfshayn Line ==
- Seyfried von Bibran († after 1530); ⚭ NN von Zedlitz und Parchwitz
  - Seyfried von Bibran († after 1580); ⚭ NN
    - Martin von Bibran auf Wolfshayn und Martinswalde
    - Seyfried von Bibran auf Wolfshayn und Martinswalde
  - Elisabeth von Bibran († after 1580); ⚭ Wenzel von Zedlitz, Governor (Landeshauptmann)

== Kosel Line ==
- Kaspar von Bibran zu Kosel und Altenoelse († about 1524); ⚭ NN
  - George von Bibran zu Kosel († after 1540); ⚭ NN
    - Kaspar von Bibran zu Kosel und Alten-Oelse († before 1588); ⚭ Anna von Kottwitz
    - Valentin von Bibran († 1591); ⚭ Salome von Loß und Hermsdorf
      - Salome von Bibran; 1.⚭ Sigismund von Loß in Wilcke; 2.⚭ Christoph von Niebelschütz in Retka
      - Valentin von Bibran auf Oelse, Obetreben, Wenigtreben und Beutendorf († after 1626)
      - Hans von Bibran auf Kosel und Buchwald († after 1626)

== Heinzebortschen Line ==
- Heinrich von Bibran auf Heinzebortschen; ⚭ NN
  - Heinrich von Bibran; ⚭ Barbara von Bortwitz auf Neudorf
    - Wolf George von Bibran (1618–1679); ⚭ NN

== Prosen Line ==
- Wolf von Bibran zu Prosen; ⚭ NN von Zedlitz und Neukirch
  - Anton von Bibran († after 1540); ⚭ NN von Blanckenstein
    - Anton von Bibran (1573–1596); ⚭ NN von Kalckreut und Lipsche
      - Wolfgang von Bibran auf Prosen, studied in Leipzig 1581

== Kittlitztreben Line ==
- Christoph von Bibran zu Kittlitztreben († after 1540); ⚭ Anna von Zedlitz und Warte
  - Johannes von Bibran zu Kittlitztreben, Lichtenwaldau und Linden († after 1566); ⚭ Eva von Schellendorf auf Polsdorf
    - Abraham von Bibran und Kittlitztreben auf Woitsdorf, provincial elder and assessor of land law for the principalities of Schweidnitz-Jauer (1575–1625); ⚭ Kunigunde von Gersdorf auf Seichau
    - Adam von Bibran zu Damsdorf und Prosen; ⚭ NN von Tschirnhaus auf Häselicht

== Closely related families with derived names and coat of arms ==
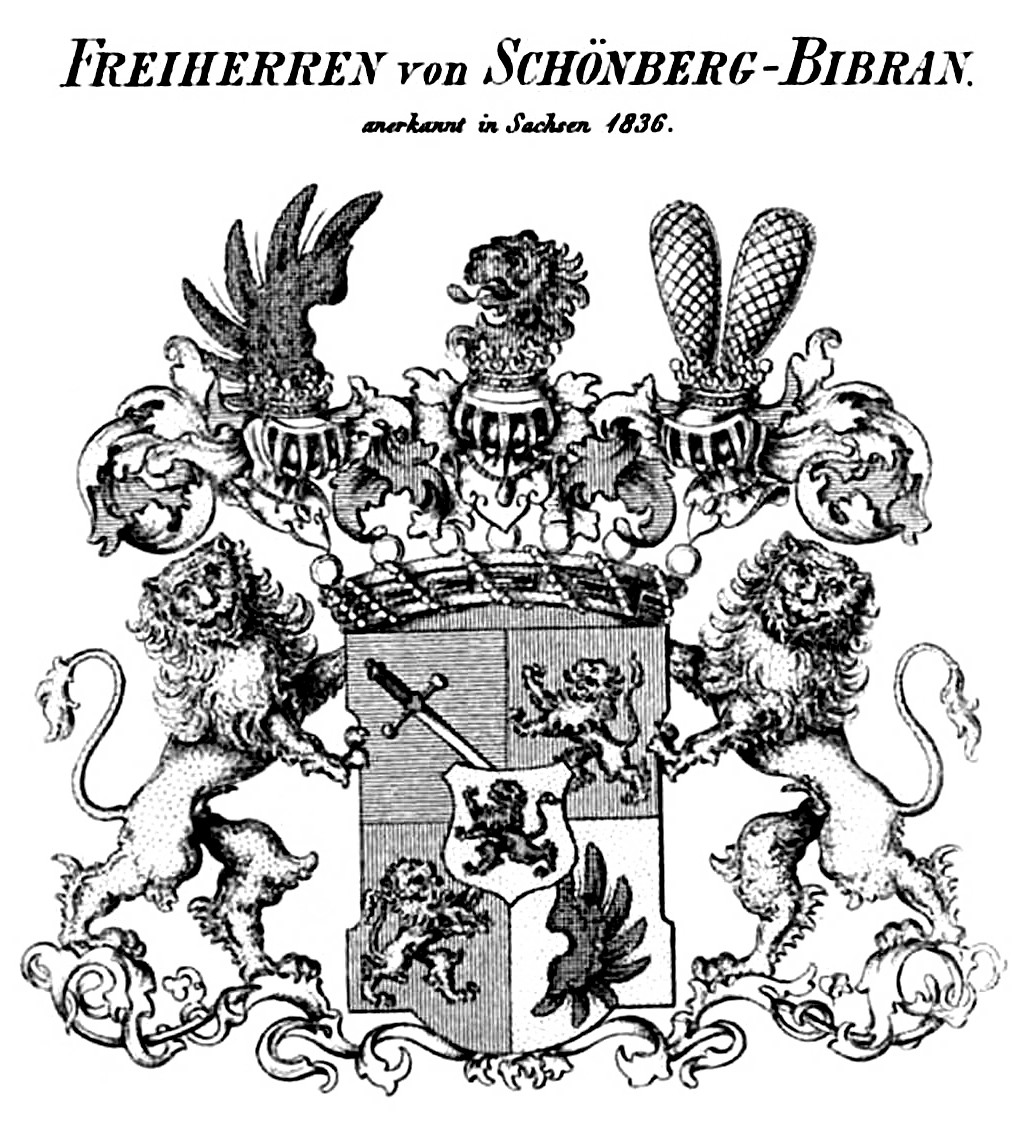
Coat of arms of the Freiherrn von Schönberg-Bibran

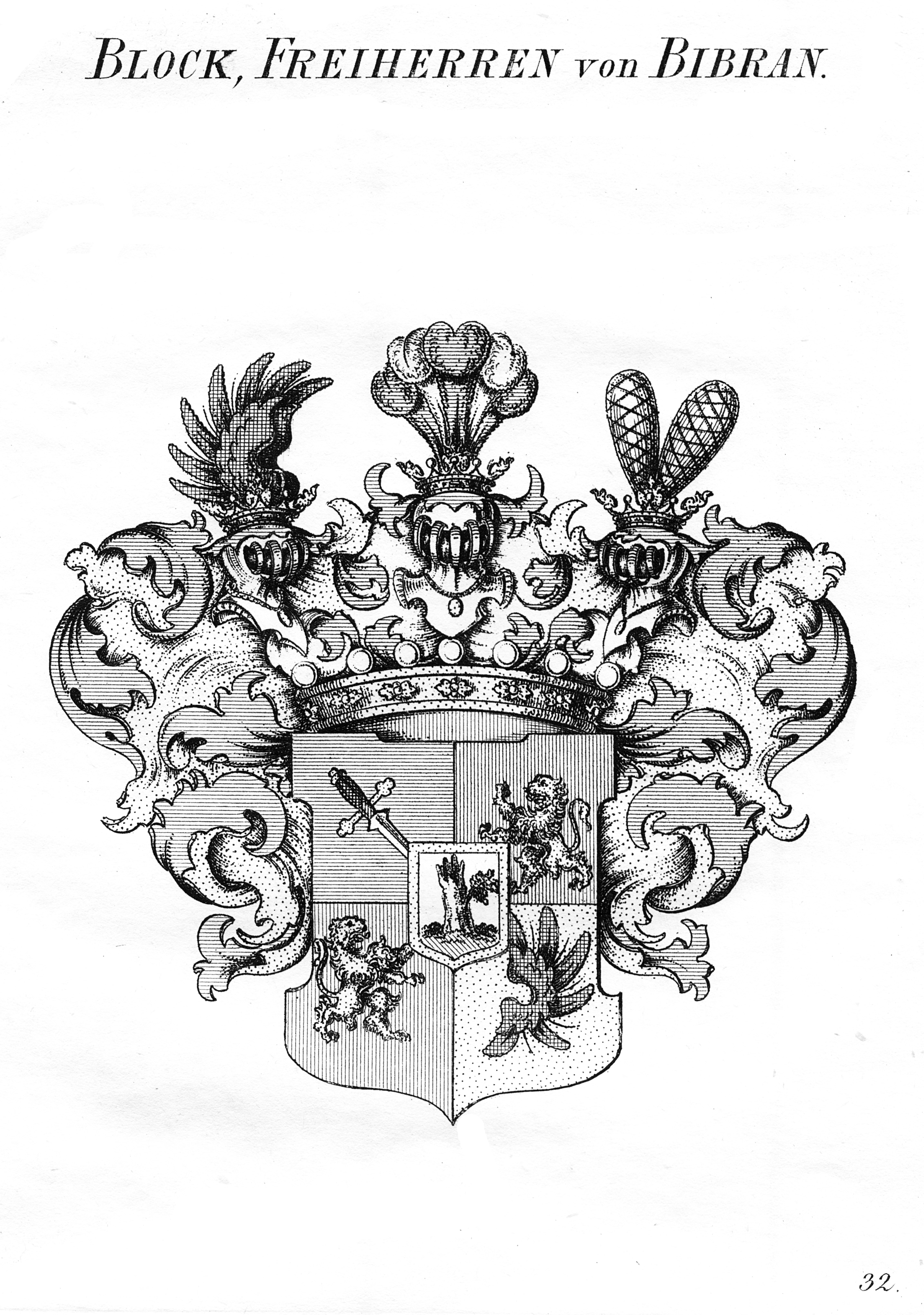
Coat of arms of the Block, Freiherrn von Bibran

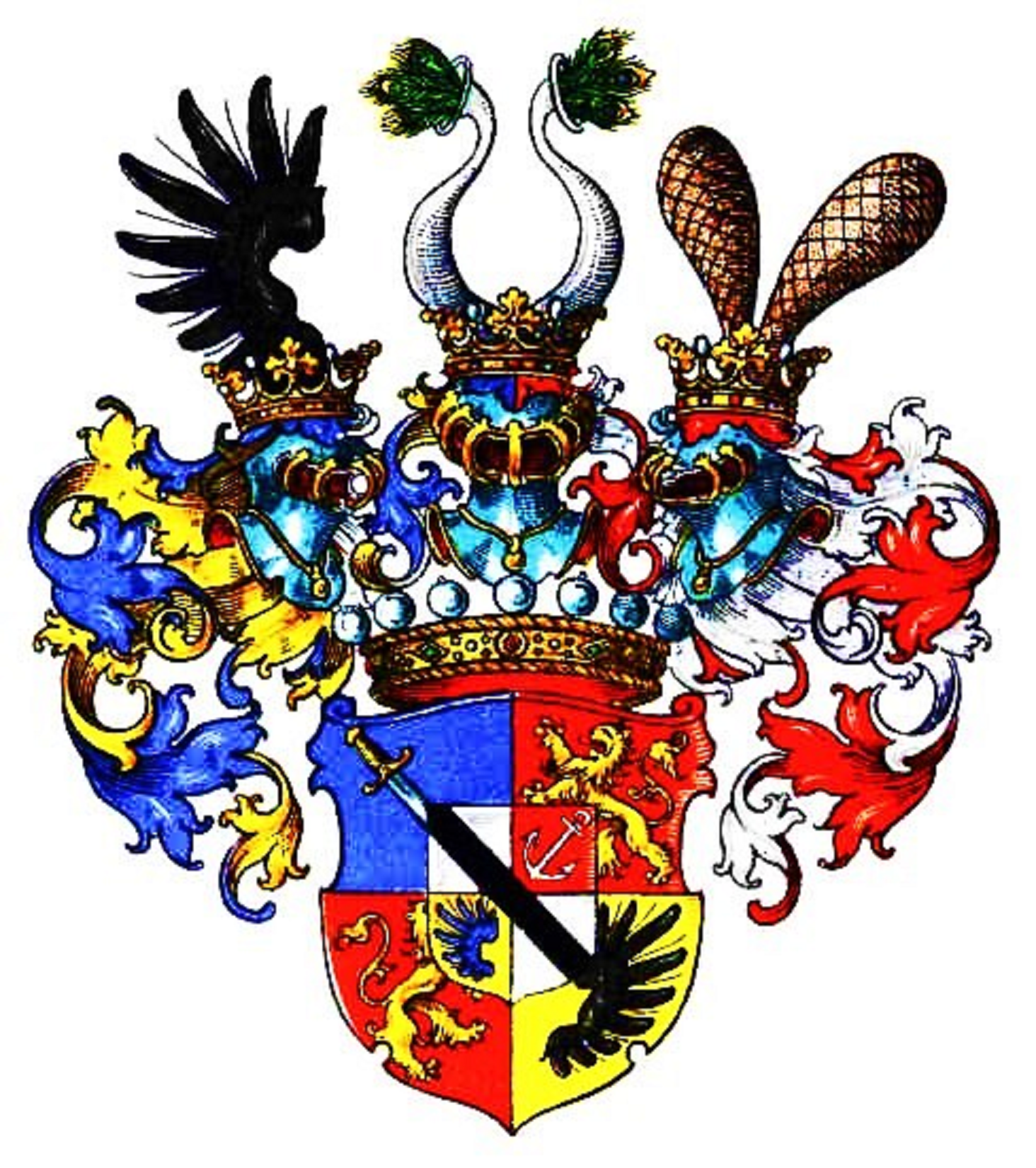
Senden-Bibran coat of arms incorporating the Bibran elements

=== Block von Bibran und Modlau, Kölichen gen. Freiherren von Bibra(n) u. Modlau, Schönberg von Bibra(n) und Modlau ===
David Heinrich von Bibran-Modlau was the apparent last male member of the family in Silesia. When he died in 1828, he had three daughters. His three sons-in-law (von Kölichen, von Block and von Schönberg) incorporated the Bibran-Modlau into their names and coat of arms.

=== von Senden-Bibran ===
The son-in-law Ernst Heinrich von Kölichen, who had incorporated the Bibran-Modlau name and coat of arms died (1832) with a daughter, Agnes, but no sons. Ernst's son-in-law, Ludwig von Senden again incorporated (c. 1836) the Bibran name into his own becoming “von Senden-Bibran” as in Gustav von Senden-Bibran.

== Bibran related castles ==
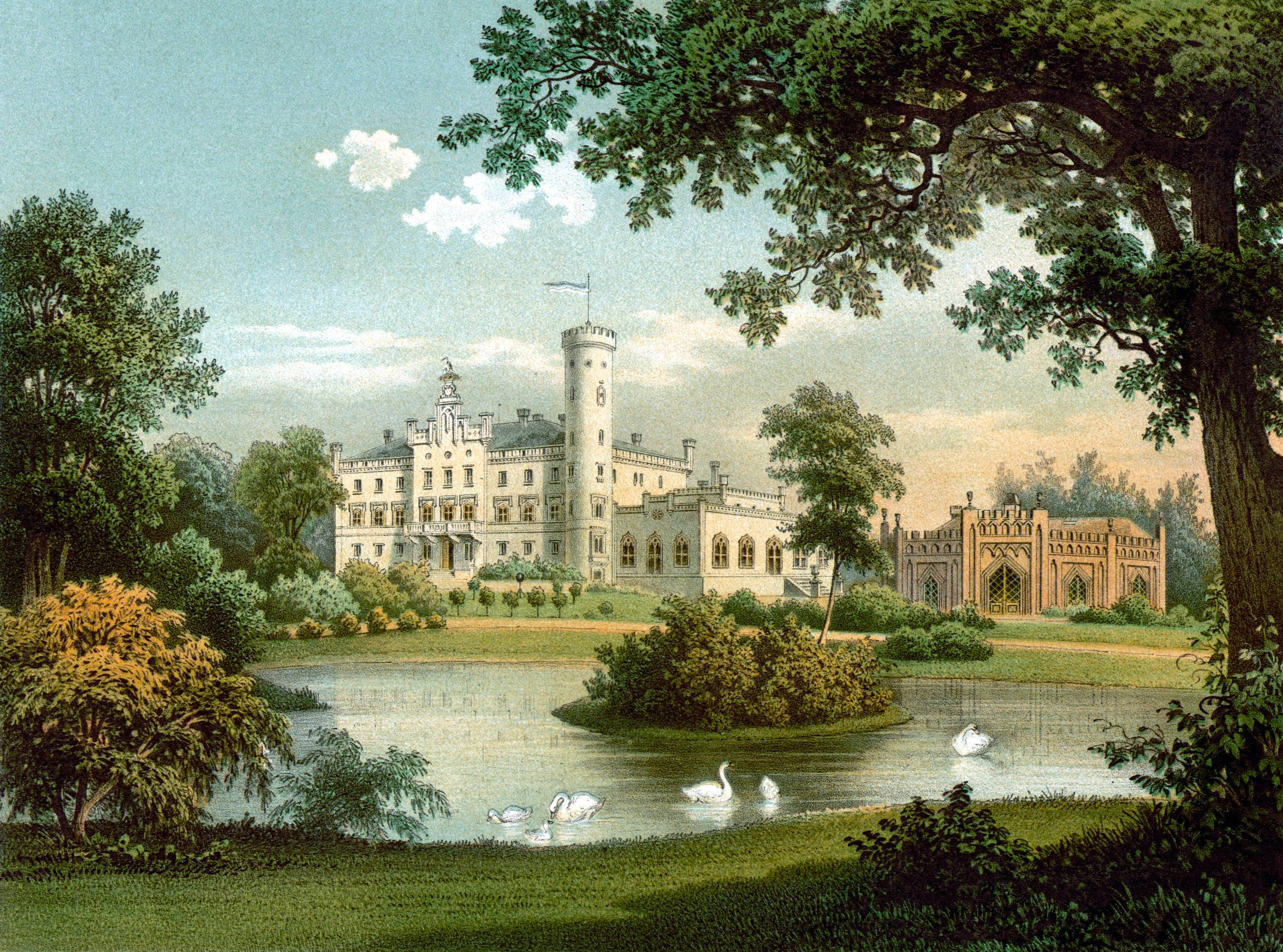
Castle Reisicht, home of both Bibran-Modlau and later Senden-Bibran, Torn down 1956

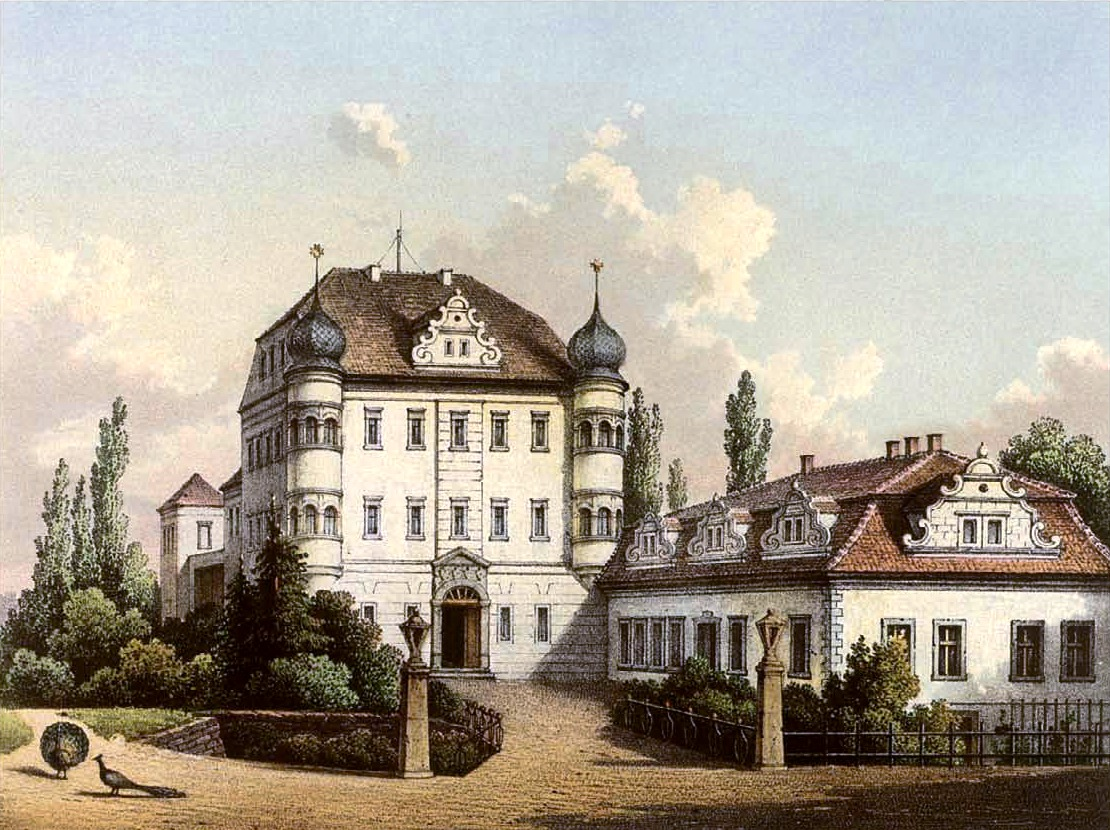
Schloss Modlau, Lower Silesia. Torn down 1950

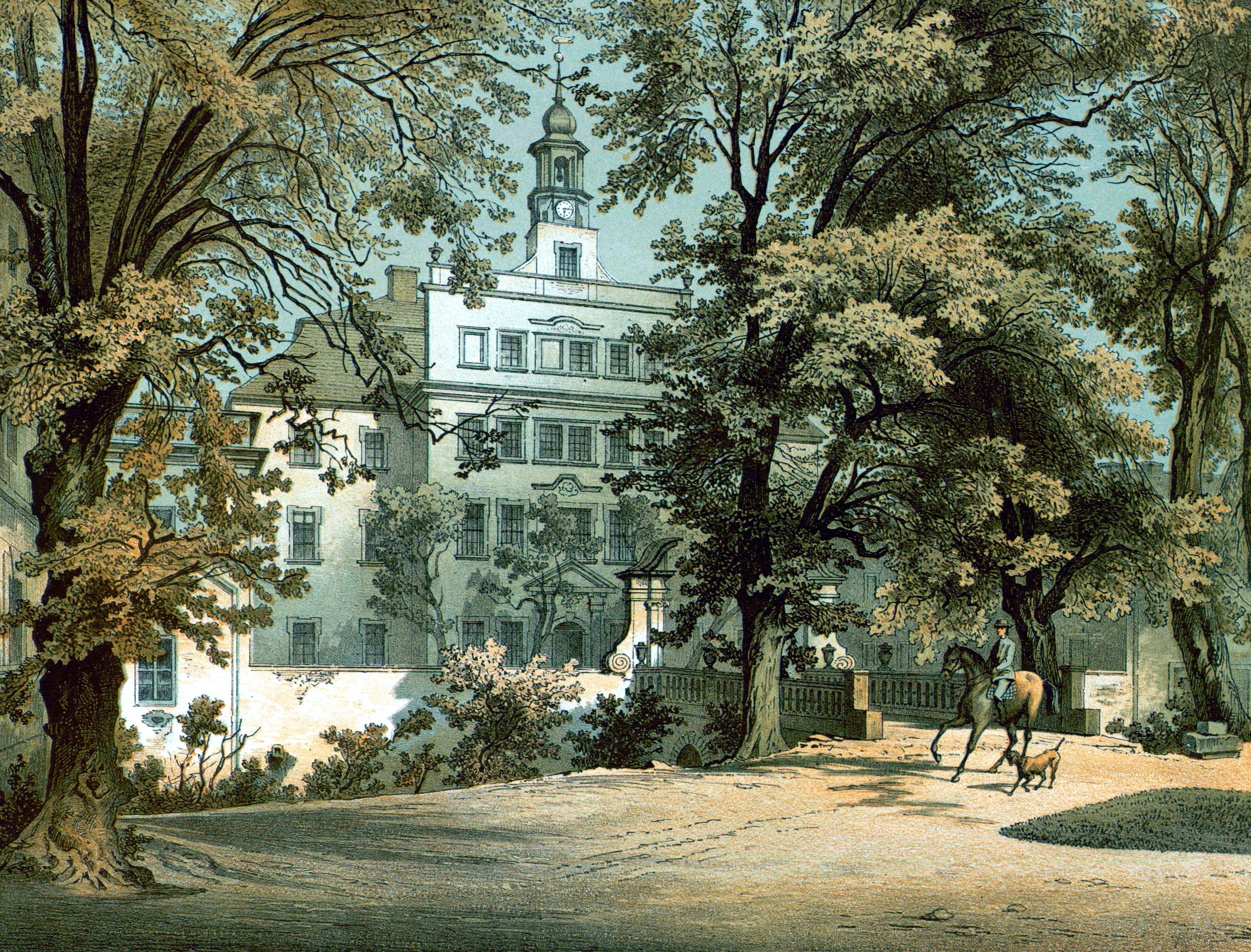
Schloss Kittlitztreben

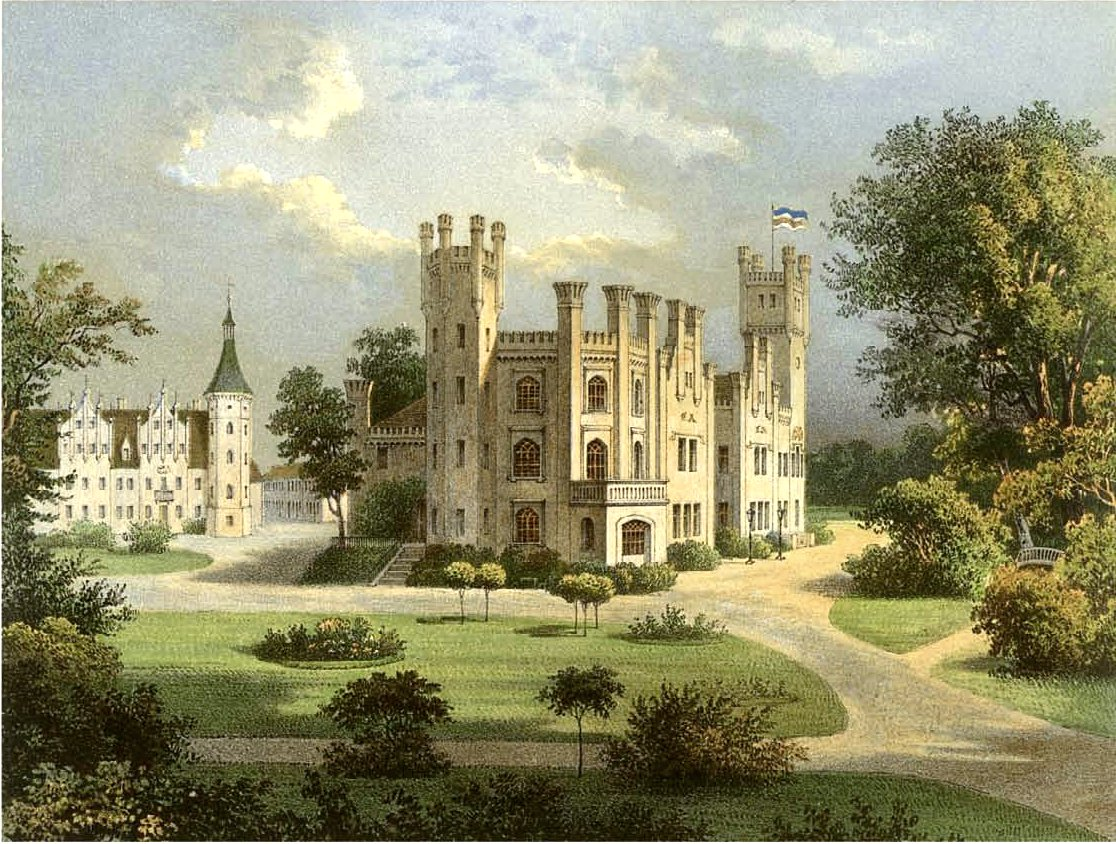
Schloss Primkenau
