= Różyniec =

- Village
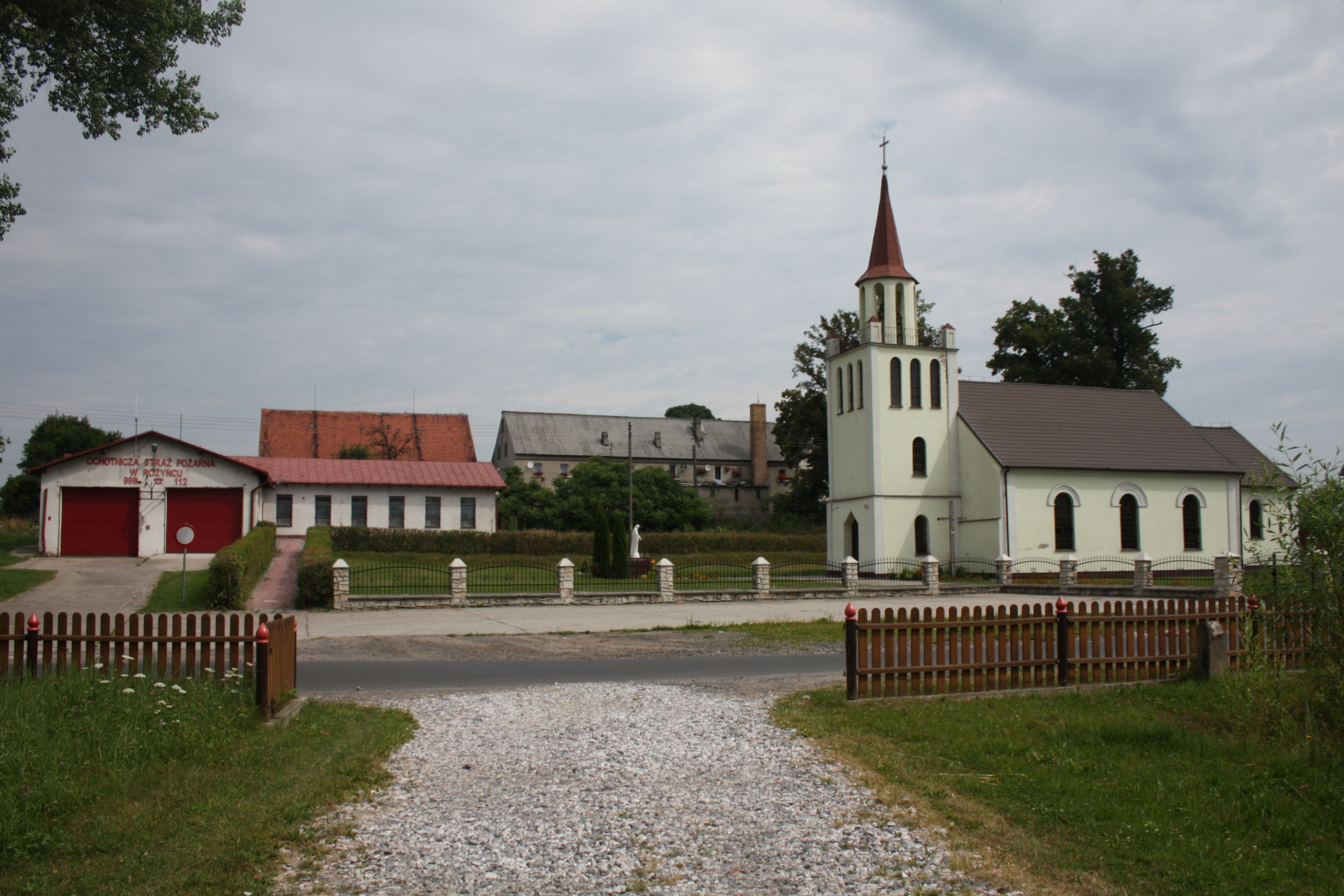

- Location within Poland
- Coordinates: 51°19′N 15°43′E
- Country: Poland
- Voivodeship: Lower Silesian
- County: Bolesławiec
- Gmina: Gromadka
- Time zone: UTC+1 (CET)
  - Summer (DST): UTC+2 (CEST)
- Vehicle registration: DBL

Różyniec [ruˈʐɨɲɛt͡s] is a village in the administrative district of Gmina Gromadka, within Bolesławiec County, Lower Silesian Voivodeship, in south-western Poland. In 2011, according to the census conducted by the Central Statistical Office, the population was 399.

== History ==
The name of the village was first mentioned in 1305 as Rosinthal, when it was part of medieval Poland. Over the years, the name of the village was changed several times, but the modern Polish name of the village is finally Różyniec. The village's origins can be traced back to Slav colonisation in the 11th and 12th centuries. It was settled again in the 13th century when settlers arrived from the west. To date, however, we know relatively little about the history of the village. Only a few dates can be mentioned, recalling important events for the village. In 1760, the first evangelical school was founded. Previously, education had been provided on the farm of the owner of Chalet Baumann. However, the most tragic date concerning Różyniec was 23–24 July 1815, when the entire village of Różyniec, including the school, burned down. However, the school was rebuilt less than a year later.

== Monuments ==
There are only three monuments in Różyniec:

- old peasant farms, the most interesting of which is number 76 and has buildings dating from the late 18th century.
- A very modest church surrounded by an empty grassy courtyard and a wooden fence. The building is now covered with new grey tiles. It has an interesting tower - originally cubic, then becoming a prism with a regular polygonal base - topped by a simple helmet. Beneath the gallery, protected by a metal balustrade, are five tall, narrow, arched windows. Much larger windows of similar design are glazed with coloured glass and arranged in the shape of a cross, framed by a single-coloured border. They allow daylight to enter the sanctuary.
- This chapel is located beside the main road in the centre of the village. It is a former 1870-1871 war memorial.

== Transport ==
The A4 motorway passes to the south of Różyniec.
