= Osła =

- Village
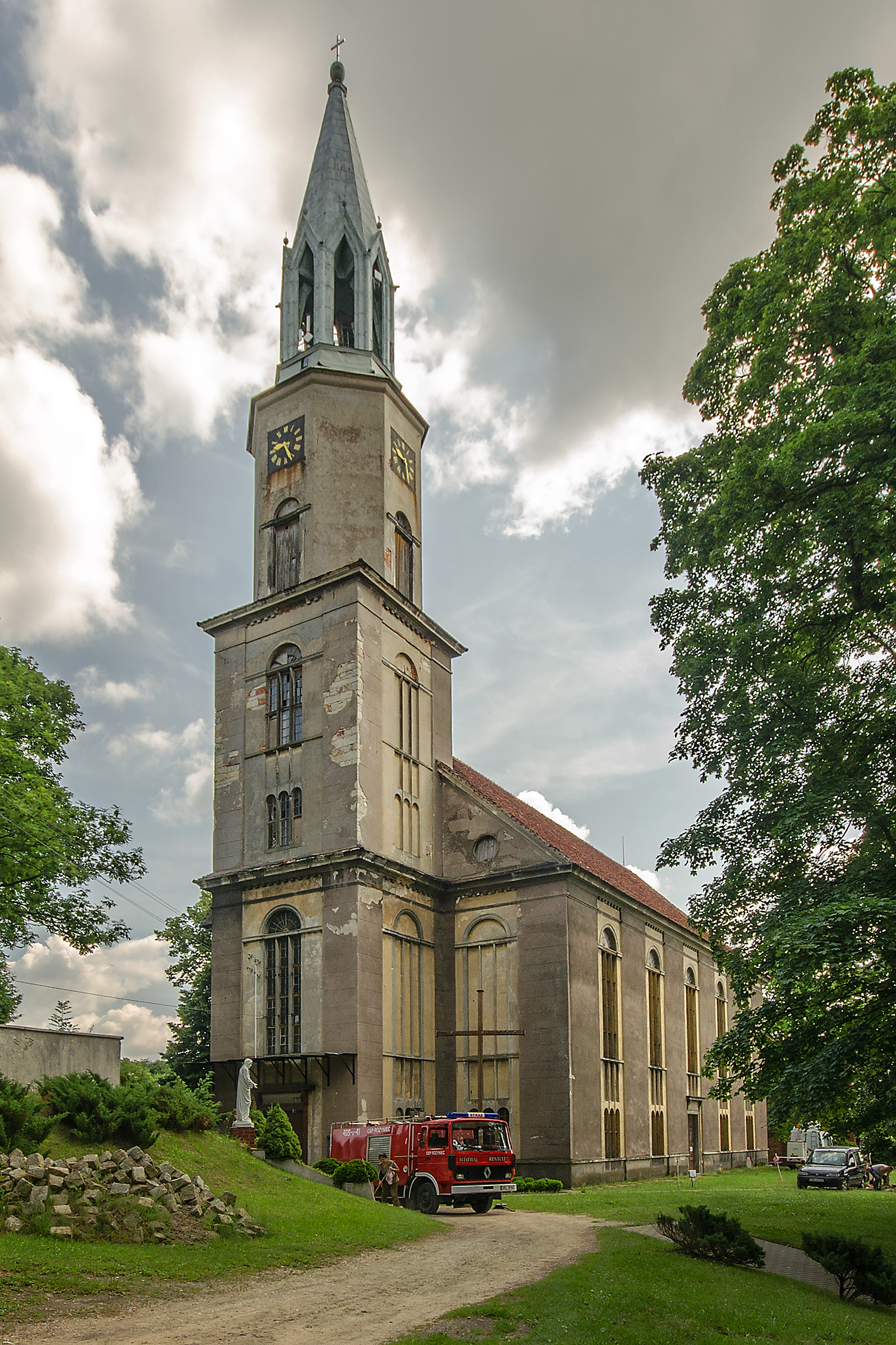
- Saints Peter and Paul church in Osła

- Location within Poland
- Coordinates: 51°19′N 15°45′E
- Country: Poland
- Voivodeship: Lower Silesian
- County: Bolesławiec
- Gmina: Gromadka
- Population: 415
- (approximate)
- Time zone: UTC+1 (CET)
  - Summer (DST): UTC+2 (CEST)

Osła [ˈɔswa] is a village in the administrative district of Gmina Gromadka, within Bolesławiec County, Lower Silesian Voivodeship, in south-western Poland.

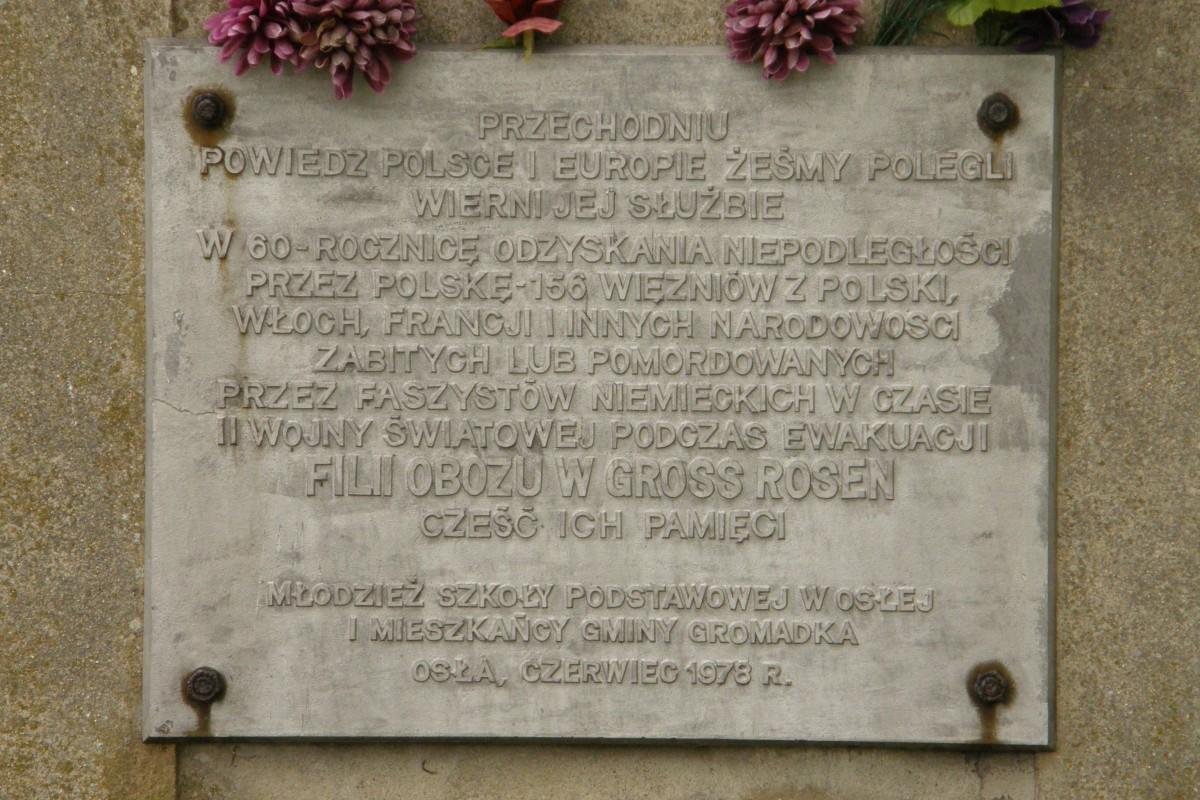
Memorial to the victims of the local Nazi German subcamp of the Gross-Rosen concentration camp

During World War II the Germans established and operated a subcamp of the Gross-Rosen concentration camp at the local sanatorium, whose prisoners were mostly Poles. In February 1945, the Germans evacuated the prisoners to the Nordhausen concentration camp, leaving only those unable to walk in the camp. The prisoners remaining in the camp were liberated by Soviet troops. There is a memorial to the victims of the camp in the village.
