= Pasternik, Lower Silesian Voivodeship =

Pasternik
- Village
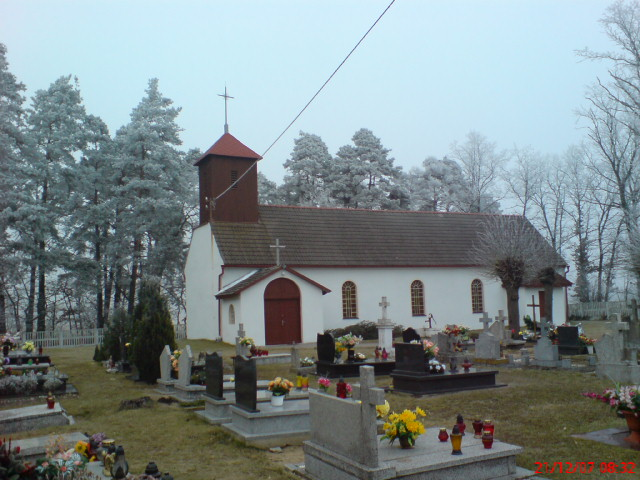

- Location within Poland
- Coordinates: 51°23′19″N 15°48′14″E
- Country: Poland
- Voivodeship: Lower Silesian
- County: Bolesławiec
- Gmina: Gromadka
- Population: 150

Pasternik [pasˈtɛrnik] is a village in the administrative district of Gmina Gromadka, within Bolesławiec County, Lower Silesian Voivodeship, in south-western Poland.
