= Wierzbowa, Lower Silesian Voivodeship =

Wierzbowa
- Village
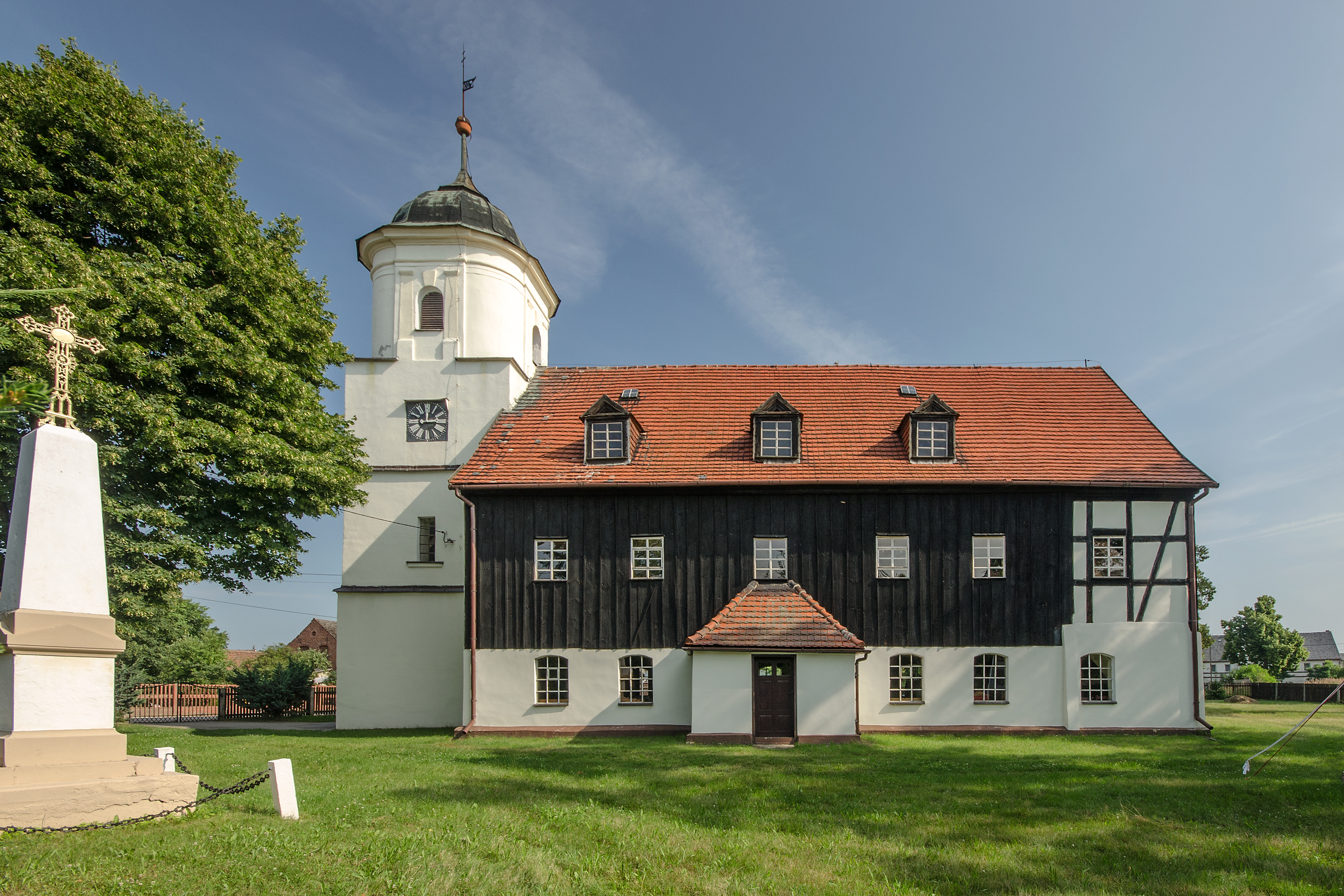
- Immaculate Conception church in Wierzbowa

- Location within Poland
- Coordinates: 51°23′16″N 15°45′40″E
- Country: Poland
- Voivodeship: Lower Silesian
- County: Bolesławiec
- Gmina: Gromadka

Population
  - Total: 500
- Time zone: UTC+1 (CET)
  - Summer (DST): UTC+2 (CEST)
- Vehicle registration: DBL

Wierzbowa [vjɛʐˈbɔva] is a village in the administrative district of Gmina Gromadka, within Bolesławiec County, Lower Silesian Voivodeship, in south-western Poland.

== History ==
During World War II, the Germans established and operated a forced labour subcamp of the Stalag VIII-A prisoner-of-war camp in the village.
