= Modła, Bolesławiec County =

Modła
- Village
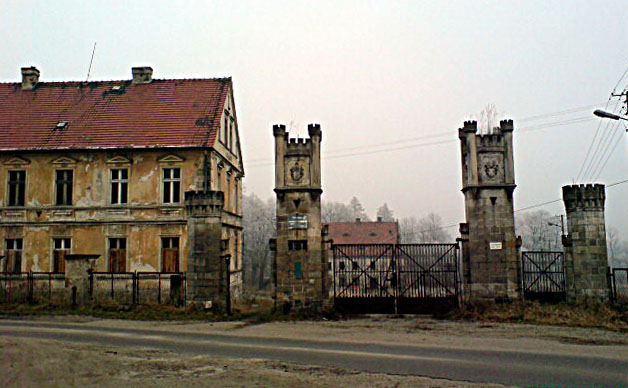

- Location within Poland
- Coordinates: 51°16′N 15°48′E
- Country: Poland
- Voivodeship: Lower Silesian
- County: Bolesławiec
- Gmina: Gromadka

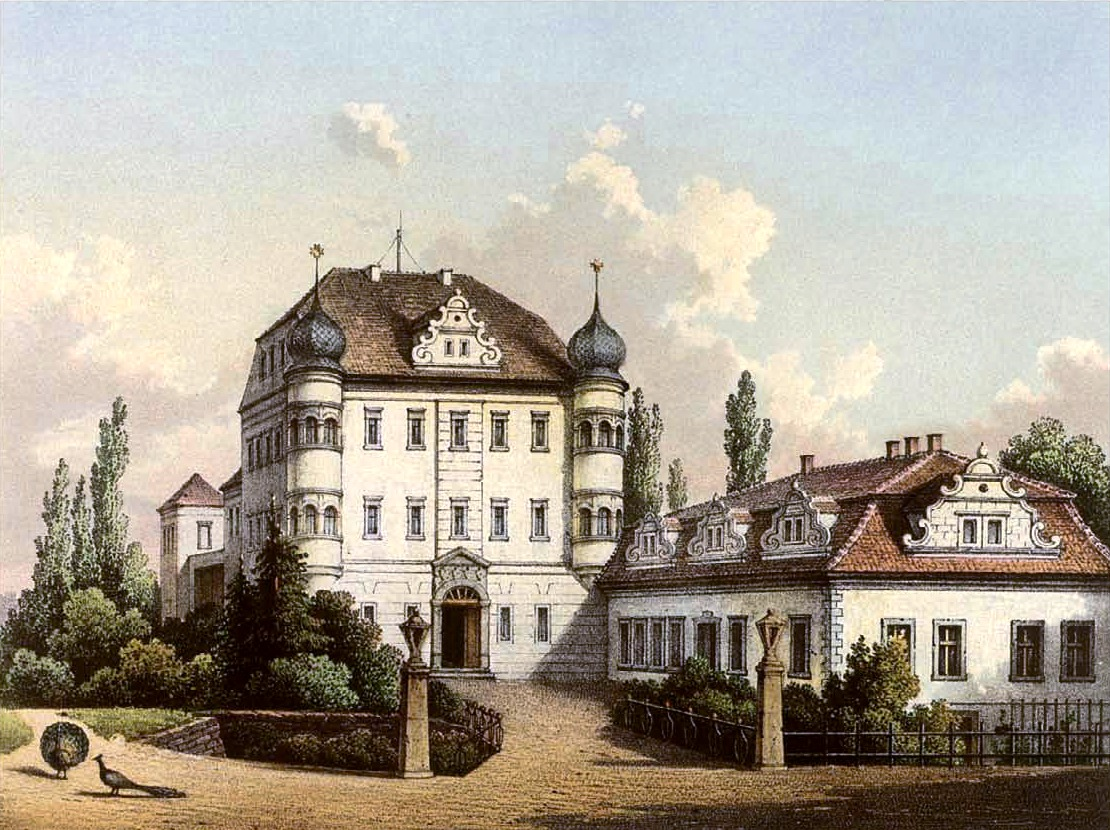
Schloss Modlau, destroyed

Modła [ˈmɔdwa] (German: Modlau) is a village in the administrative district of Gmina Gromadka, within Bolesławiec County, Lower Silesian Voivodeship, in south-western Poland.

It was the site of the castle Modlau which was almost completely destroyed. Castle Modlau was one of the seats of the Bibran-Modlau family.
