= Llynfi power station =

Former coal-fired power station

- Country: United Kingdom
- Location: Bridgend
- Coordinates: 51°34′13″N 03°36′40″W
- Status: Decommissioned and demolished
- Commission date: 1943
- Decommission date: 1977
- Owners: South Wales Power Company Limited (1942–1948); British Electricity Authority (1948–1955); Central Electricity Authority (1955–1957); Central Electricity Generating Board (1958–1977)
- Operator: As owner

Thermal power station
- Primary fuel: Coal
- Turbine technology: Steam turbines
- Chimneys: 1
- Cooling towers: 2
- Cooling source: Cooling towers

Power generation
- Units operational: 4 x 30 MW
- Make and model: 30 MW English Electricity
- Nameplate capacity: 120 MW
- Annual net output: 754 GWh (1955)

Llynfi power station supplied electricity to the Bridgend area of Glamorgan South Wales from 1943 to 1977. The coal-fired station was originally built and operated by the South Wales Power Company Limited to supply electricity to munitions factories during the Second World War. It was completed by the post-nationalisation British Electricity Authority in 1951, and was later operated by the Central Electricity Generating Board. The power station was closed in 1977 and was subsequently demolished. There have been several proposals to redevelop the site.

== History ==
Llanfi power station was built during the Second World War by the South Wales Power Company Limited. It was one of several power station built at this time, such as Birmingham Corporation’s Hams Hall B station, which the Electricity Commissioners and the Central Electricity Board were able to demonstrate were required to supply electricity to munitions factories.

The South Wales Company also owned and operated Upper Boat power station.

Llynfi power station (51°34′13″N 3°36′40″W) was built north of Bridgend adjacent to the Afon Llynfi and the Bridgend to Maesteg railway line which facilitated access to cooling water for the condensers and coal supplies for the boilers.

== Equipment specification ==
The plant at Llynfi power station comprised:

- 4 × 300,000 lb/h (37.8 kg/s) Stirling boilers, working pressure 675 psi at 910 °F (46.6 bar at 488 °C). These were supplied with pulverised coal fuel produced for each boiler by 3 × 7.35 tons/h Babcock and Wilcox E44 mills.
- Coal was supplied to the station via dedicated sidings connected to the Bridgend to Maesteg railway.
- 4 × 30 MW English Electric turbo-alternators, generating current at 11 kV.
- Step-up transformers raised the voltage to 66 kV for local distribution.
- Two cooling towers. One film reinforced concrete tower with a capacity of 2.5 million gallons per hour (3.16 m^{3}/s). One film reinforced concrete tower with a capacity of 3.0 million gallons per hour (3.79 m^{3}/s). The cooling tower built during the war was painted with camouflage.

Evaporative water losses from the cooling towers was made-up with water from the adjacent Afon Llynfi.

The generating sets were commissioned over several years: the first set in December 1943, the second in April 1944, the third in January 1951, and the final set in November 1951.

== Operations ==
Upon nationalisation of the British electricity supply industry in 1948 under the provisions of the Electricity Act 1947 (10 & 11 Geo. 6. c. 54) the South Wales Power Company Limited electricity undertaking was abolished, ownership of Llynfi power station was vested in the British Electricity Authority, and subsequently the Central Electricity Authority and the Central Electricity Generating Board (CEGB). At the same time the electricity distribution and sales responsibilities of the electricity undertaking were transferred to the South Wales Electricity Board (SWALEC).

=== Operating data ===
Operating data for the period 1946–72 is shown in the table:

Llynfi power station operating data, 1946–72
Year	Running hours or load factor (per cent)	Maximum output capacity MW	Electricity supplied GWh	Thermal efficiency per cent
1946	(73.8 %)	62.5	403.986	26.17
1954	8760	113	743.865	25.93
1955	8760	113	754.103	25.75
1956	8784	113	720.309	25.99
1957	8710	113	626.826	26.12
1958	8627	113	497.594	24.77
1961	(51.4 %)	113	509.050	24.74
1962	(43.9 %)	113	434.982	23.99
1963	(45.56 %)	113	450.964	23.46
1967	(35.6 %)	113	352.869	22.48
1972	(20.7 %)	113	205.791	20.85

Electricity output (GWh) from Llynfi power station

With a high thermal efficiency when it was new the station was used intensively during the 1950, with a load factor running hours approaching 100 per cent. It was used less intensively in the 1960s and 1970s.

== Closure and proposals ==
Llynfi power station was decommissioned on 31 March 1977.

There was a proposal in 1977 to use the power station to burn domestic and trade waste to generate electricity. The station would need to burn 460,000 tons per year of waste to make the scheme viable. The proposal was not taken forward. The plant and equipment was removed from the station soon after closure. The buildings were left although the cooling towers were demolished.

In 2011 there was a proposal to burn biomass at the station. The biomass would be imported into Newport docks and the former railway sidings at Llynfi would be reinstated. Planning permission was granted by Bridgend County Borough Council but the plans were not developed.

A further proposal to build a waste combustion plant was put forward in 2019. There were local concerns about increased traffic.

In 2024 the US microreactor developer Last Energy announced plans for four 20 MWe micro-modular nuclear power plants at the site of the decommissioned Llynfi coal-fired power station. Last Energy estimates the project represents a capital investment of £300 million, which will not require UK public funding. Last Energy have a tentative offer of a $103.7 million loan from the US government Export–Import Bank of the United States for the first micro-reactor installation. In February 2025, Last Energy started the application process for a site licence from the Office for Nuclear Regulation.

== See also ==
- Timeline of the UK electricity supply industry
- List of power stations in Wales
