= Borówki, Lower Silesian Voivodeship =

Borówki
- Village
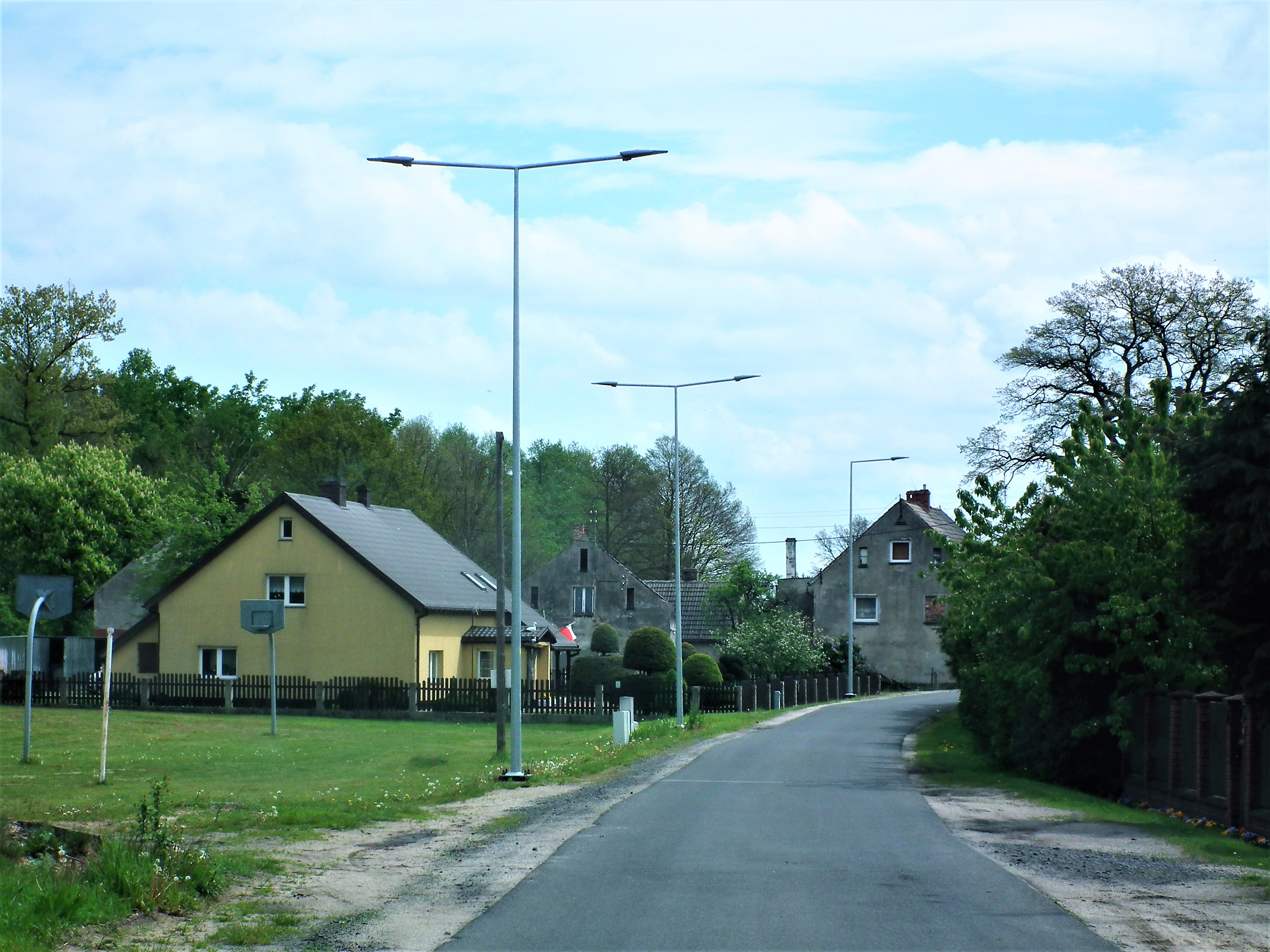

- Location within Poland
- Coordinates: 51°21′41″N 15°43′32″E
- Country: Poland
- Voivodeship: Lower Silesian
- County: Bolesławiec
- Gmina: Gromadka

Borówki [bɔˈrufki] is a village in the administrative district of Gmina Gromadka, within Bolesławiec County, Lower Silesian Voivodeship, in south-western Poland.
