= Nowa Kuźnia, Bolesławiec County =

Nowa Kuźnia
- Village
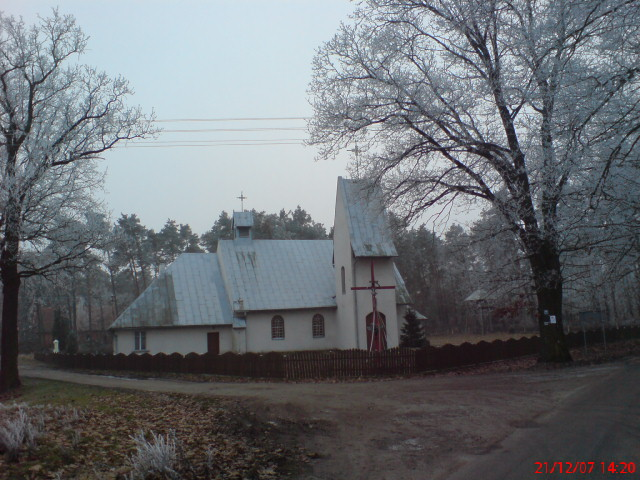

- Location within Poland
- Coordinates: 51°23′26″N 15°49′7″E
- Country: Poland
- Voivodeship: Lower Silesian
- County: Bolesławiec
- Gmina: Gromadka

Nowa Kuźnia [ˈnɔva ˈkuʑɲa] is a village in the administrative district of Gmina Gromadka, within Bolesławiec County, Lower Silesian Voivodeship, in south-western Poland.
