= Patoka Township =

Patoka Township may refer to:

== Illinois ==
- Patoka Township, Marion County, Illinois

== Indiana ==
- Patoka Township, Crawford County, Indiana
- Patoka Township, Dubois County, Indiana
- Patoka Township, Gibson County, Indiana
- Patoka Township, Pike County, Indiana
