= Gromadka =

- Village
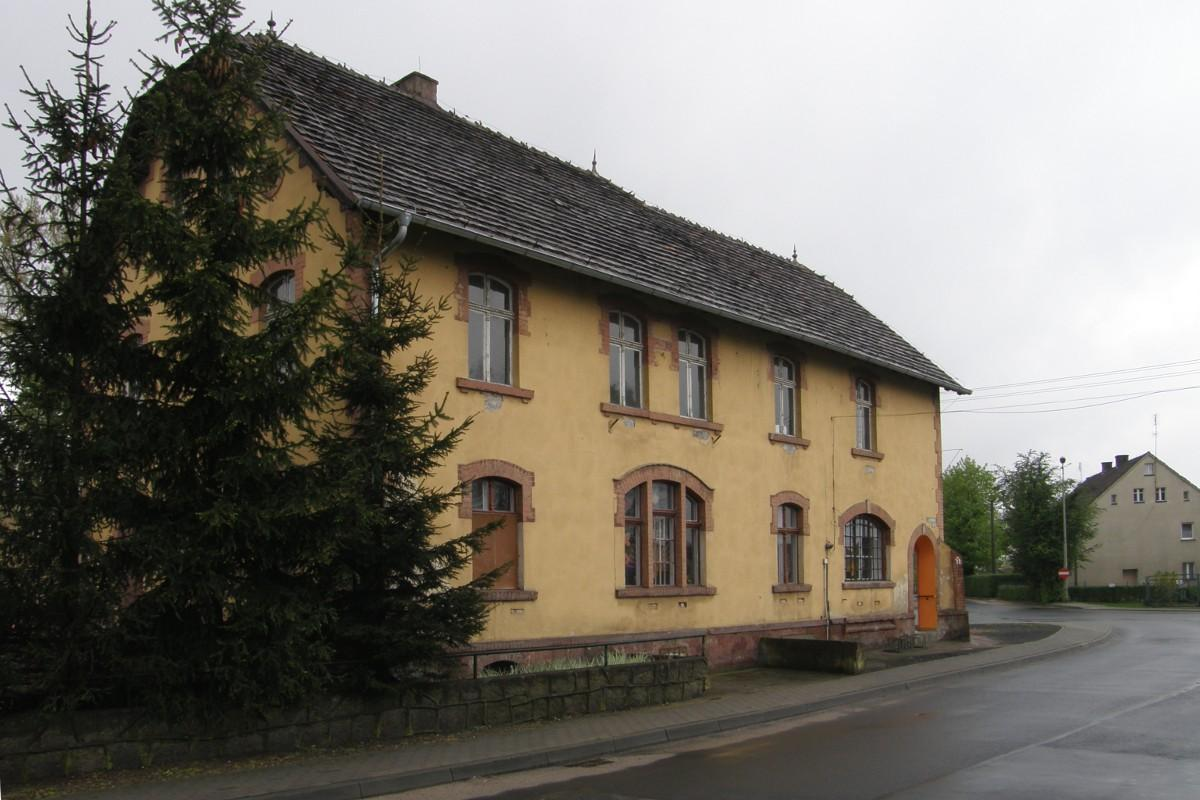

- Location within Poland
- Coordinates: 51°21′36″N 15°45′32″E
- Country: Poland
- Voivodeship: Lower Silesian
- County: Bolesławiec
- Gmina: Gromadka
- Population (approx.): 2,150
- Website: http://www.gromadka.pl

Gromadka [ɡrɔˈmatka] is a village in Bolesławiec County, Lower Silesian Voivodeship, in south-western Poland. It is the seat of the administrative district (gmina) called Gmina Gromadka.

From 1975 to 1998 Gromadka was in Legnica Voivodeship.
