= Patoka, Lower Silesian Voivodeship =

Patoka
- Village
- Location within Poland
- Coordinates: 51°21′33″N 15°49′09″E
- Country: Poland
- Voivodeship: Lower Silesian
- County: Bolesławiec
- Gmina: Gromadka
- Population: 140

Patoka [paˈtɔka] is a village in the administrative district of Gmina Gromadka, within Bolesławiec County, Lower Silesian Voivodeship, in south-western Poland.
