= Motyle, Lower Silesian Voivodeship =

Motyle
- Village
- Location within Poland
- Coordinates: 51°23′59″N 15°47′37″E
- Country: Poland
- Voivodeship: Lower Silesian
- County: Bolesławiec
- Gmina: Gromadka
- Time zone: UTC+1 (CET)
  - Summer (DST): UTC+2 (CEST)
- Vehicle registration: DBL

Motyle [mɔˈtɨlɛ] is a village in the administrative district of Gmina Gromadka, within Bolesławiec County, Lower Silesian Voivodeship, in south-western Poland.
