= Energy Impact Center =

Research institute in Washington, D.C., the United States

- Formation: 2017; 9 years ago
- Founder: Bret Kugelmass (Managing director)
- Type: Nonprofit
- Purpose: Nuclear power advocacy; climate change research; decarbonization solutions
- Headquarters: Washington, D.C.
- Website: www.energyimpactcenter.org

The Energy Impact Center is an American research institute based in Washington, D.C. It primarily advocates for the expansion of nuclear power as a clean energy solution to climate change. The organization's research into nuclear power has led it to the development of projects like OPEN100, an open-source platform with blueprints for nuclear power plant design and construction. In 2020, the center spun out Last Energy, a commercial developer aimed at linking investors with agencies looking to build nuclear plants. The center is also responsible for the podcasts, Titans of Nuclear and Energy Impact. It was founded in 2017 by Bret Kugelmass.

== History ==
The Energy Impact Center (EIC) was founded in Washington, D.C. by Bret Kugelmass in 2017. The goal at the organization's outset was to advocate for an increase in nuclear power to help reverse the effects of climate change by 2040. In 2017, Kugelmass began conducting interviews as head of EIC with experts in nuclear energy and related fields for a podcast called Titans of Nuclear. The podcast debuted in January 2018. Over the course of 2018 and 2019, Kugelmass and other members of the EIC team conducted around 1,500 interviews for the podcast and visited over 100 nuclear sites to compile research about the feasibility of nuclear power expansion.

In 2019, the center introduced the Nuclear Energy Grand Challenge, a prize competition that asked university students to develop business proposals for mitigating the cost, duration, and risks of power plant construction and maintenance. In February 2020, the EIC introduced two new entities: OPEN100 and Last Energy. The former is an open-source platform that aims to ease the design and construction process of nuclear power plants by providing freely-available blueprints. The latter is a for-profit startup that connects investors with agencies looking to develop nuclear power plants. Last Energy received $3 million in a funding round led by First Round Capital at the time of the announcement.

In 2021, EIC introduced a second podcast called Energy Impact that focuses on a broader range of energy-related topics. In July of that year, it was announced that Transcorp Energy in Nigeria had agreed to use EIC's OPEN100 model to construct the country's first nuclear power plants.

== Projects ==
=== OPEN100 ===
OPEN100 is an open-source platform that publishes blueprints for the design and construction of nuclear power plants. It also provides financing and maintenance details. The initial OPEN100 plans introduced in February 2020 called for a 100-megawatt pressurized water reactor that could be built in 18 months at a cost of $300 million (USD). Regulatory restrictions could increase those numbers in practice. OPEN100 was developed by EIC in partnership with the United States Department of Energy national laboratories and other collaborators, including Framatome, the Electric Power Research Institute, and the U.K.'s National Nuclear Laboratory. In July 2021, Nigeria's Transcorp Energy announced that it would develop nuclear power plants in the country using the OPEN100 model.

=== Nuclear Energy Grand Challenge ===
The Nuclear Energy Grand Challenge is a prize competition that was initially envisioned as a series of ongoing contests to develop proposals for mitigating the cost, duration, and risks of nuclear power plant construction and maintenance. The initial challenge, known as "Reimagining Nuclear Waste," took place at the University of Michigan in 2019 and 2020 and asked students to develop business proposals that offered new solutions for nuclear waste beyond indefinite storage. The winning team was awarded $17,000 for its proposal.

=== Podcasts ===
EIC produces two podcasts: Titans of Nuclear and Energy Impact. Titans of Nuclear was first launched in January 2018 and generally features one-on-one discussions with nuclear energy experts from various political, scientific, technological, and business backgrounds. The Energy Impact podcast was launched in March 2021 and features discussions on a broader range of energy-related topics. Both podcasts are primarily hosted by EIC managing director, Bret Kugelmass, but other EIC members serve as occasional co-hosts.
