= Titans of Nuclear =

Science podcast

Presentation
- Hosted by: Bret Kugelmass (Main); Jadwiga Najder (Co-host); Olubunmi Olajide (Co-host); Naomi Senehi (Co-host)
- Genre: Science; technology; talk
- Format: Audio; video
- Created by: Bret Kugelmass
- Developed by: Energy Impact Center
- Language: English
- Length: 20–75 minutes

Production
- No. of episodes: 331 (as of September 13, 2021)

Publication
- Original release: January 8, 2018

Related
- Website: www.titansofnuclear.com

Titans of Nuclear is an interview podcast developed by the Energy Impact Center. Each episode features interviews led by Bret Kugelmass. Other hosts include Jadwiga Najder, Olubunmi Olajide, and Naomi Senehi. Guests generally include nuclear energy experts who come from various political, scientific, and business backgrounds. The one-on-one discussions typically revolve around nuclear energy and related topics including political policy, climate change, and nuclear medicine.

== History ==
Titans of Nuclear was conceived by Bret Kugelmass, founder of the Energy Impact Center in Washington, D.C., in 2017. That year, he began recording interviews with a variety of nuclear energy experts. The first episode of the podcast was made available online on January 8, 2018 and featured Michael Shellenberger as the guest. Other early guests in 2018 included eventual Assistant Secretary of Energy for Nuclear Energy and head of the Office of Nuclear Energy, Rita Baranwal, and individuals associated with both the Idaho National Laboratory and the Pacific Northwest National Laboratory.

In 2019, the podcast featured interviews with national politicians, including House Representative for Massachusetts Seth Moulton and Idaho Senator Mike Crapo. Other episodes that year featured discussions with members of the Canadian Nuclear Safety Commission. Kugelmass would later begin sharing hosting duties with Jadwiga Najder, Olubunmi Olajide, and Naomi Senehi.

In December 2020, Titans of Nuclear conducted a miniseries of interviews with individuals from the United States Department of Energy's Gateway for Accelerated Innovation in Nuclear (GAIN) program. As of September 2021, the podcast has released 331 episodes.

== Format ==
Episodes generally consist of one-on-one interviews conducted by Bret Kugelmass, Jadwiga Najder, Olubunmi Olajide, or Naomi Senehi with guests who are experts in nuclear energy. Guests have included professors, business executives, politicians, diplomats, scientists, and others. Discussions revolve around nuclear power as an alternative and potentially carbon-negative energy source. The podcast and its guests are broadly proponents of the proliferation of nuclear energy, but some guests have taken an opposing position. Other topics discussed include nuclear energy policy and climate change.
