= OPEN100 =

- Type of project: Open-source blueprints for nuclear power plant construction
- Owner: Energy Impact Center
- Founder: Bret Kugelmass
- Established: February 25, 2020
- Status: Active
- Website: www.open-100.com

OPEN100 is a project that claims to provide open-source blueprints to build nuclear power plants. Its stated goal is to reduce the cost and duration of nuclear reactor construction and increase the nuclear power supply 100-fold by 2040 to aid in the decarbonization of the global economy. It was developed by Bret Kugelmass and the Energy Impact Center, a non-profit organization founded by Kugelmass that advocates for clean energy solutions to climate change.

== Overview ==
OPEN100 was first announced in February 2020 by Bret Kugelmass and the Energy Impact Center (EIC). Open-source blueprints for the construction of a nuclear power plant were uploaded to the project's website soon after the announcement. Those blueprints contained designs for a power plant with a 100-megawatt pressurized water reactor. The OPEN100 plans aim to standardize nuclear power plant construction to increase speed and cost-effectiveness, allowing plants to be built in under two years for a cost of $300 million. New plant construction would likely face regulatory hurdles in practice, however.

The EIC developed the plan in collaboration with the United States Department of Energy national laboratories and other entities to help increase nuclear power capacity 100-fold by 2040 in an effort to curb and reverse the effects of climate change. In July 2021, it was announced that Transcorp Energy in Nigeria would begin implementing the OPEN100 model to build the country's first nuclear power plants.

Since OPEN100's data is open-source, the U.S. Department of Energy exempted the project's documents for free distribution worldwide.

== Critics ==
Providing free knowledge isn't sufficient to guarantee adoption, as many countries do not have the proper legislation and laws to deploy nuclear production domestically. Another risk of the approach is that, just like open-source software, users customize it to their own needs, and this lack of standards could hurt the global deployment of OPEN100's nuclear plants worldwide.
