= Frýdlant =

- Town
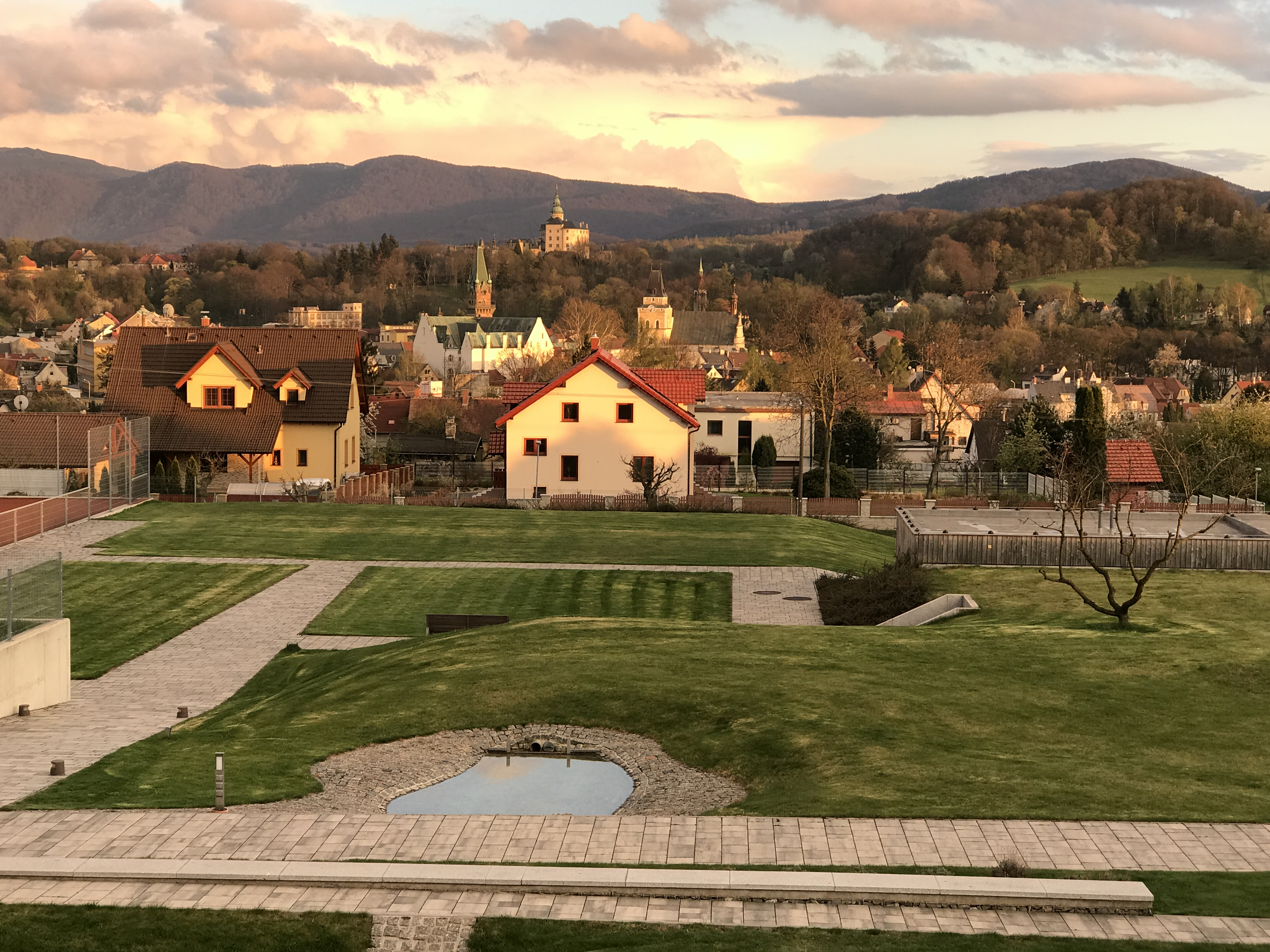
- View of Frýdlant

- Coat of arms

- Location in the Czech Republic
- Coordinates: 50°55′17″N 15°4′47″E
- Country: Czech Republic
- Region: Liberec
- District: Liberec
- First mentioned: 1278

Government
  - Mayor: Jiří Stodůlka

Area
  - Total: 31.61 km^{2} (12.20 sq mi)
- Elevation: 295 m (968 ft)

Population (2026-01-01)
  - Total: 7,332
  - Density: 232.0/km^{2} (600.8/sq mi)
- Time zone: UTC+1 (CET)
  - Summer (DST): UTC+2 (CEST)
- Postal code: 464 01
- Website: www.mesto-frydlant.cz

Frýdlant (Czech pronunciation: [ˈfriːdlant]; German: Friedland) is a town in Liberec District in the Liberec Region of the Czech Republic. It has about 7,300 inhabitants. The town is located on the Smědá River on the border between the Jizera Foothills and Jizera Mountains, near the border with Poland.

Frýdlant is known for its complex consisting of an early Gothic castle and a Renaissance castle, protected as a national cultural monument. The historic town centre is well preserved and is protected as an urban monument zone.

== Administrative division ==
Frýdlant consists of three municipal parts (in brackets population according to the 2021 census):

- Frýdlant (6,356)
- Albrechtice u Frýdlantu (159)
- Větrov (740)

== Etymology ==
The name is derived from the Middle High German words vriden ('to protect') and lant ('land'). The name referred to the function of the local castle.

== Geography ==
Frýdlant is located about 17 kilometres (11 mi) north of Liberec, in the salient microregion of Frýdlant Hook, close to the border with Poland. It lies mostly in the Jizera Foothills. The southern part of the municipal territory extends into the Jizera Mountains and includes the highest point of Frýdlant, the hill Špičák at 724 m (2,375 ft) above sea level. The Smědá River flows through the town.

== History ==
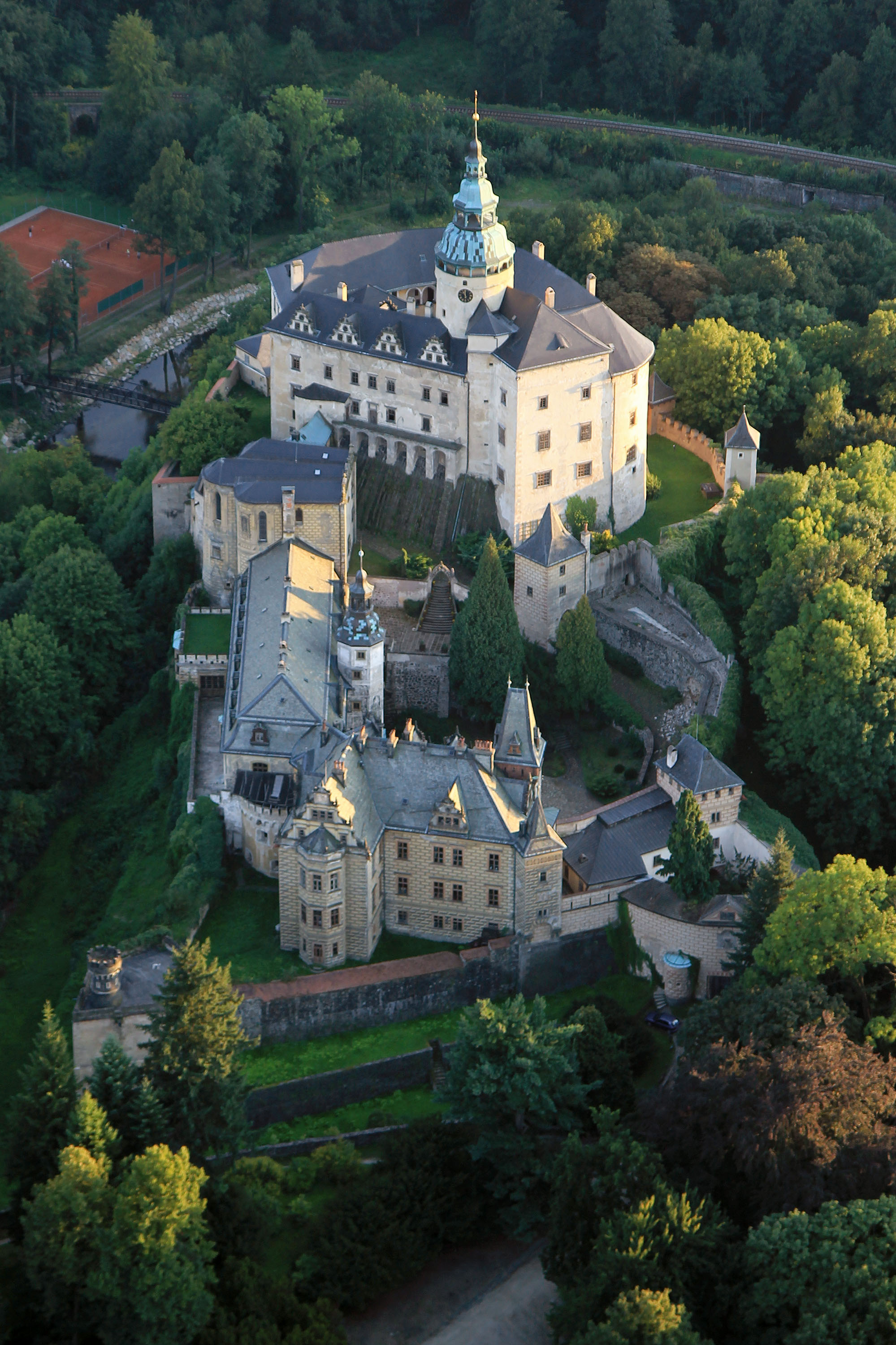
Frýdlant Castle

=== 6th–16th centuries ===
The area was settled by Slavic tribes from Lusatia from the 6th century onwards.

In the 13th century, the local castle was held by the Ronovci family until the middle of the century, when Častolov of Ronov was forced to return the castle and other properties to King Ottokar II.

The first written mention of Frýdlant is from 1278, when Rulko of Birbstein, also called Rudolf of Bieberstein, purchased the castle and surrounding land from the king. Rulko held property in Silesia and Upper Lusatia and family members held court positions.

There were important trade routes through the area, including to Görlitz and to Lusatia. From Görlitz, the Via Regia provided routes to Russia, Spain, and throughout Europe. Perhaps as early as 1304, and definitely by 1381, a moat and curtain walls were constructed to surround and protect the town; these were largely removed in 1774.

The Birbsteins (Biebersteins) supported King Sigmund during the Hussite Wars (1419–1434). Frýdlant was taken by the Hussites in 1428. Between 1428 and 1433, the town was raided several times. The Frýdlant estate went to Emperor Ferdinand I when Christopher, the last of the line of the Birbsteins, died in 1551. The castle went into the Redern family when Bedřich bought it in 1558. Since the ruler set the religion for an area at that time, Bedřich made Protestant churches and closed the Catholic church in Hejnice that had been the destination for religious pilgrimages. Several new villages were established and the production of linen cloth resulted in an economic boom during the initial years of the Redern family. Marco Spazzio di Lancio, an Italian architect hired by the family, expanded the castle in the 16th century.

=== 17th–19th centuries ===
Christoph of Redern was considered a traitor when he opposed Emperor Ferdinand II and supported Frederick V after the Battle of White Mountain in 1620. All of his property was then taken from him. Frýdlant then went to Albrecht von Wallenstein, who became Duke of Frýdlant and lived at Jičín. Wallenstein returned Catholicism to the area and held the lands until 1634, when he was assassinated. Frýdlant then went to Matthias Gallas, Count of Campo, Duke of Lucera as a reward for his fight against Wallenstein in 1636 by Emperor Ferdinand II.

At the end of the Thirty Years' War, the castle was possessed by the Swedes. They constructed fortified barbicans and strengthened the defensive walls. In 1639, Christoph of Redern returned to Frýdlant after a period of exile. One year later, the Swedes left Bohemia entirely. Due to the loss of religious freedom and Protestants being forced to adopt the Catholic religion, many exiles did not return to the area. The area continued to suffer through 1642.

The estates remained with Matthias Gallas and the Gallas family until 1757. When Count Philip Joseph von Gallas (1703–1757) died without children, the estate went to Christian Philip von Clam (1748–1805), his nephew, under the stipulation that going forward the family would assume the Gallas coat-of-arms and that his family name would be changed to Clam-Gallas.

In 1800 or 1801, the Clam-Gallas family opened the castle to the public as a museum. Napoleon and his troops were in the town in 1813, to the detriment of the citizens of the town. A textile industry developed in the town in the 19th century. In 1899, the Plague Column was constructed in the memory of the victims of five plague epidemics. The town also survived several significant fires.

In 1875, a railway line from Liberec via Frýdlant to Zawidów was put into operation. Lines to Mirsk and the Frýdlant–Heřmanice Railway to Zittau followed soon.

=== 20th century ===
Until 1918, the town was part of Austria-Hungary. It remained with the Clam-Gallas family until the last descendant Clotilda, who died in 1982, having moved to Vienna in April 1945.

Following the 1938 Munich Agreement, the town was occupied by Nazi Germany and administered as part of the Reichsgau Sudetenland. After World War II, it fell back to Czechoslovakia and renamed Frýdlant. The German-speaking population was expelled according to the Beneš decrees and replaced by Czech settlers.

In 2016, Georg Mederer and Erich Stenz, German treasure hunters, claimed that trucks delivered items from the amber chamber of Saint Petersburg, Russia to the castle in the late period of the war. They state that the items previously owned by Peter the Great were stolen by the Nazis and stored in the castle cellars with contemporaneously constructed brick walls. The men further state that they have been unable to search for the stolen items due to the Czech government and the Czech National Heritage Institute.

== Demographics ==
Historical population

Year	Pop.	±%
1869	6,367	—
1880	6,698	+5.2%
1890	7,154	+6.8%
1900	8,519	+19.1%
1910	9,337	+9.6%

Year	Pop.	±%
1921	8,193	−12.3%
1930	8,199	+0.1%
1950	5,584	−31.9%
1961	6,153	+10.2%
1970	6,097	−0.9%

Year	Pop.	±%
1980	7,063	+15.8%
1991	7,647	+8.3%
2001	7,514	−1.7%
2011	7,495	−0.3%
2021	7,255	−3.2%

Source: Censuses

== Transport ==
The I/13 road from Liberec to the Czech–Polish border in Habartice runs through the town.

Frýdlant is located on two railway lines of local importance, heading from Liberec to Černousy and to Nové Město pod Smrkem.

== Sights ==
=== Frýdlant Castle ===
The castle complex consists of the early Gothic castle with a high tower and a Renaissance castle. The Gothic castle was founded in the mid-13th century and the Renaissance castle was built in the second half of the 16th century. There are exhibits, such as of Albrecht von Wallenstein, the Thirty Years' War, and an armoury of 1,000 weapons used for military and hunting. The castle includes the Chapel of Saint Anne, the Knights' Hall, rooms for the count and countess, and a working kitchen. Frýdlant Castle is among the most valuable castles in the Czech Republic and is the oldest castle museum in Central Europe, and is protected as a national cultural monument.

=== Church of the Finding of the Holy Cross ===
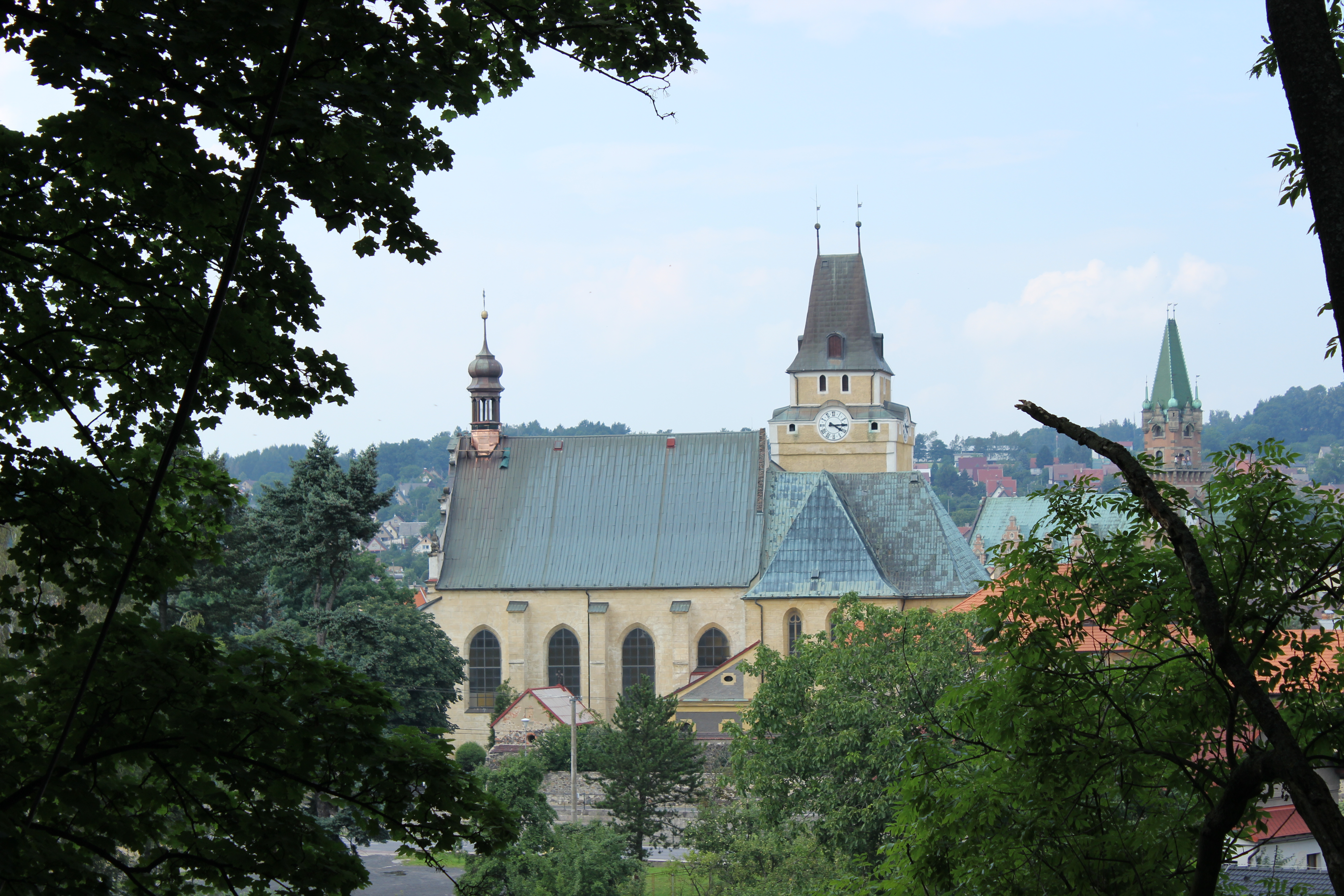
Church of the Finding of the Holy Cross

The Church of the Holy Cross was built in the mid-16th century by Italian architects, which has a mixture of architectural styles due to construction over the years. A Renaissance style chapel for the Redern family tomb was built in 1566. A mausoleum was built for the Redern family in 1610.

=== Town hall and museum ===
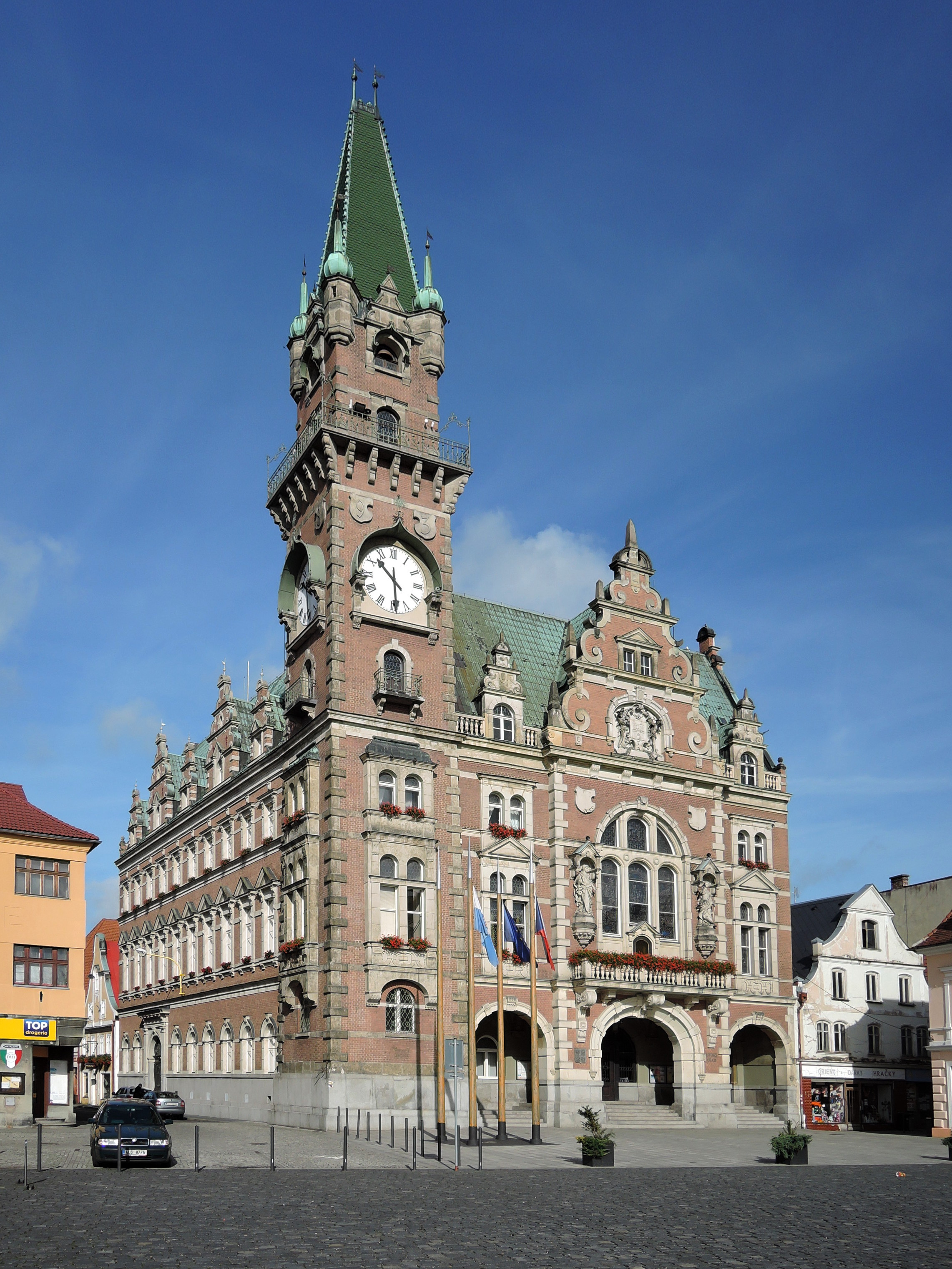
Town hall on Náměstí T. G. Masaryka

In 1893, a new town hall was erected in the centre of the town on the square Náměstí T. G. Masaryka according to plans by the architect Franz Neumann. Inside the town hall is a bust of Albrecht von Wallenstein, created by a sculptor from nearby Raspenava. The building has stained glass windows and the exterior has statues of Self-Sacrifice and Justice. Nowadays, the Frýdlant Town Museum is located on the second floor with archaeological and historical exhibits.

=== Town fortifications ===
Several fragments of the town walls have been preserved, including torsos of three prismatic towers. The walls are almost circular in outline, built of local basalt.

== In popular culture ==
The town's castle is believed to be the source of inspiration for The Castle (1926) by Franz Kafka.

== Notable people ==
- Alexander Bittner (1850–1902), paleontologist and geologist
- Josef Blösche (1912–1969), German soldier and war criminal
- Otto Adolf Wenzel Kade (1927–1980), German translation scholar
- Jan Budař (born 1977), actor, director and musician
- Iva Mocová (born 1980), footballer
- Jan Rajnoch (born 1981), footballer
- Tomáš Plíhal (born 1983), ice hockey player
- Karolína Bednářová (born 1986), volleyball player
- Ladislav Šmíd (born 1986), ice hockey player
- Antonín Hájek (1987–2022), ski jumper

== Twin towns – sister cities ==
Frýdlant is twinned mainly with other towns sharing the historic German name Friedland:

- Friedland, Mecklenburg-Vorpommern, Germany
- Friedland, Lower Saxony, Germany
- Friedland, Brandenburg, Germany
- Frýdlant nad Ostravicí, Czech Republic
- Korfantów, Poland
- Mieroszów, Poland
- Pravdinsk, Russia
- Siekierczyn, Poland
