= Wilka–Zawidów railway =

Non-passenger railway line in Poland and the Czech Republic

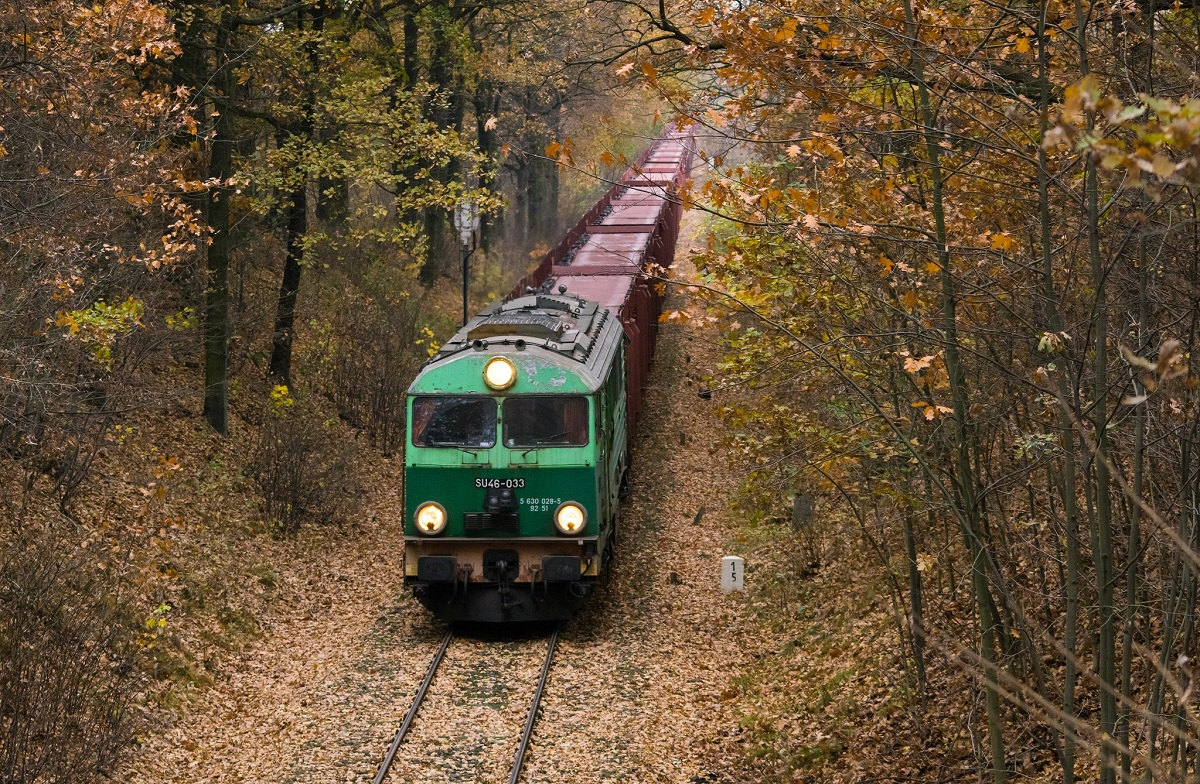
- Class SU46 hauling freight on the line

Overview
- Status: Operational; freight-only
- Line number: PKP 344
- Locale: Lower Silesian Voivodeship, Poland
- Termini: Wilka; Zawidów
- Stations: 1

History
- Opened: 1 July 1875
- Passenger services withdrawn: 3 April 2000

Technical
- Line length: 4.82 km (3.00 mi)
- Number of tracks: 1
- Track gauge: 1,435 mm (4 ft 8 1/2 in) standard gauge
- Operating speed: 70 km/h (43 mph)

The Wilka–Zawidów railway is a single-track, non-electrified, freight-only railway line connecting Wilka railway junction in Wilka and Zawidów railway station in Zawidów in the Lower Silesian Voivodeship of south-western Poland.

Sometimes called the Zawidów–Černousy railway due to its cross-border connection with Černousy in the Czech Republic, the only station on the line is Zawidów.

== History ==
The railway line opened on 1 July 1875. At the time, it was in the German Empire, which allowed passenger services to operate beyond what is now the Czech border.

After World War II, the area came under Polish administration. As a result, the line was taken over by Polish State Railways. Passenger services towards Černousy (now in the Czech Republic) were immediately withdrawn, with Zawidów now serving as a terminus station.

On 3 October 1948, Wilka 2 (eastern curve) of the Wilka railway junction opened, allowing trains to directly run towards Zgorzelec. Passenger services were withdrawn from the line on 3 April 2000.

== Border crossing ==
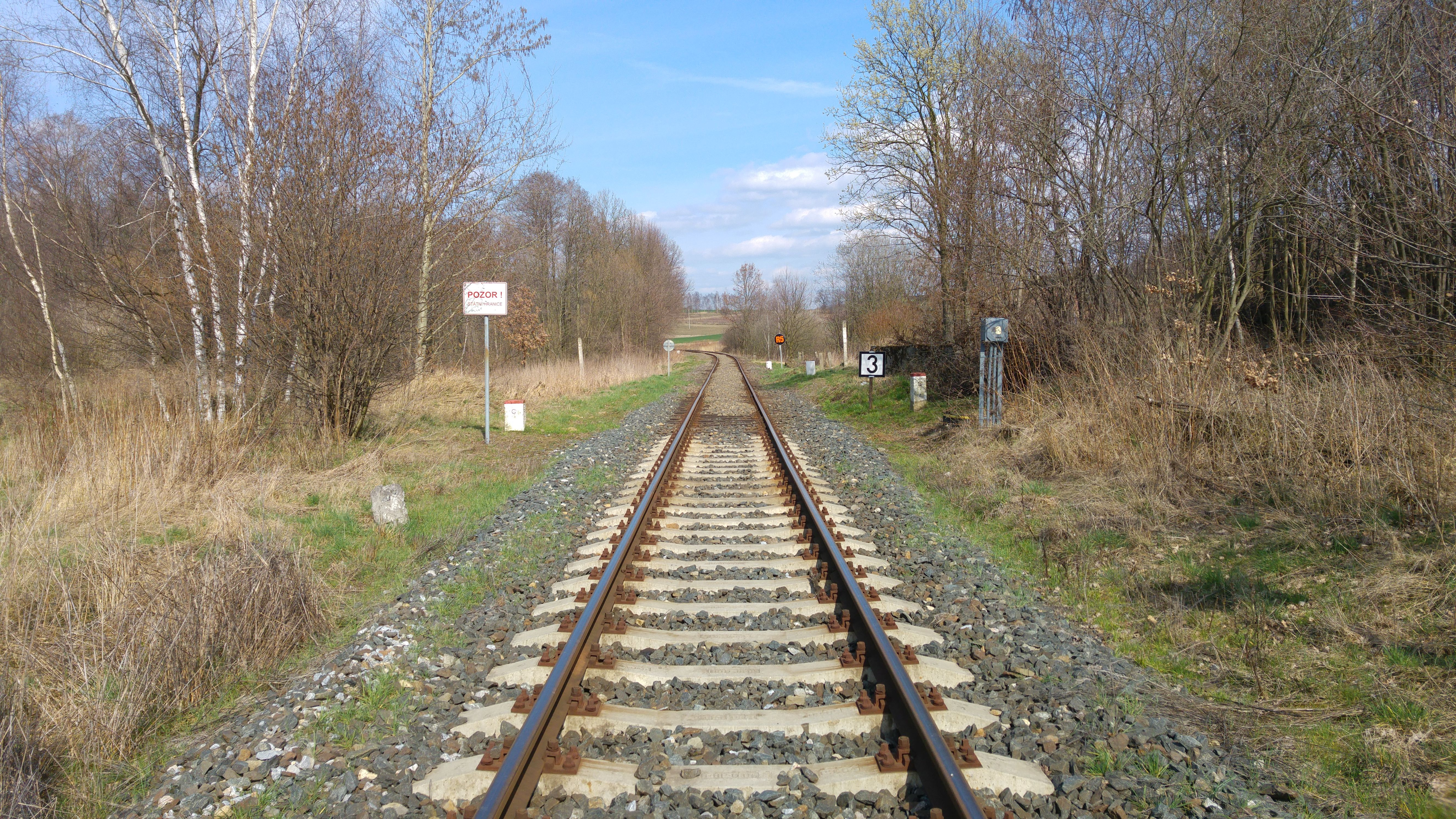
Line on the Poland–Czech Republic border, pictured from the Czech side

Due to border changes after World War II, a border crossing was established on the line between Poland and Czechoslovakia. Under a 1975 agreement, only freight trains could use the crossing. Inspections were carried out by the Zawidów Border Control Post (GPK Zawidów).

This was followed by a 1996 agreement between Poland and the Czech Republic, also only allowing freight trains to use the crossing on the Poland–Czech Republic border. The border crossing was abolished when Poland joined the Schengen Area in 2007.
