= Višňová (Liberec District) =

- Municipality
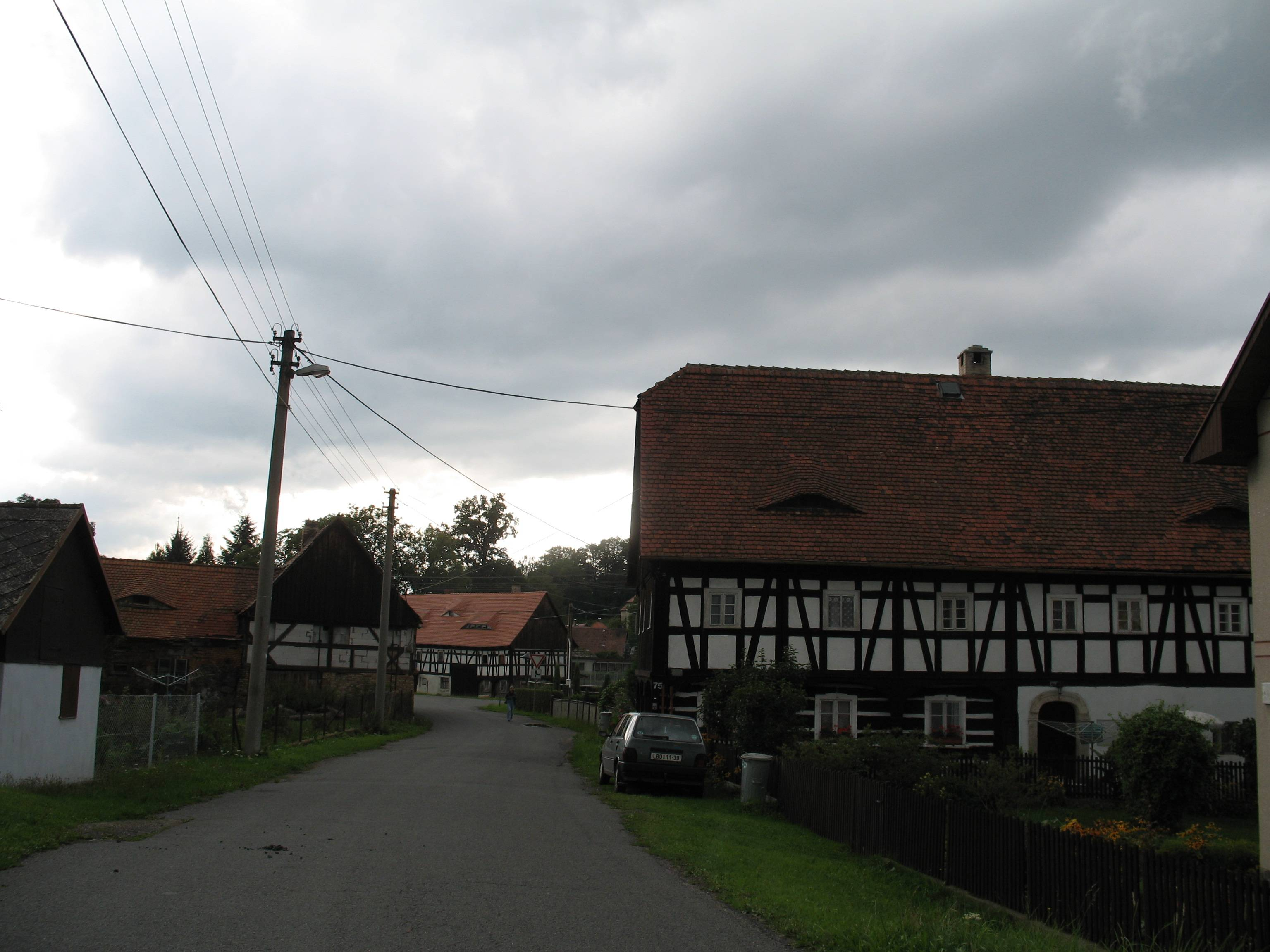
- Timber framed houses

- Flag Coat of arms

- Location in the Czech Republic
- Coordinates: 50°58′0″N 15°1′30″E
- Country: Czech Republic
- Region: Liberec
- District: Liberec
- First mentioned: 1334

Area
  - Total: 30.29 km^{2} (11.70 sq mi)
- Elevation: 228 m (748 ft)

Population (2026-01-01)
  - Total: 1,344
  - Density: 44.37/km^{2} (114.9/sq mi)
- Time zone: UTC+1 (CET)
  - Summer (DST): UTC+2 (CEST)
- Postal code: 464 01
- Website: www.ob-vis.net

Višňová (until 1948 Weigsdorf) is a municipality and village in Liberec District in the Liberec Region of the Czech Republic. It has about 1,300 inhabitants.

== Administrative division ==
The municipality of Višňová consists of nine municipal parts (in brackets population according to the 2021 census):

- Višňová (530)
- Andělka (119)
- Filipovka (25)
- Loučná (18)
- Minkovice (128)
- Poustka (153)
- Předlánce (159)
- Saň (8)
- Víska (148)

== Etymology ==
The initial German name of the settlement was Wigandsdorff, meaning "Wigand's village". In the 15th century, the name was distorted to Weigsdorf, and this name was used both in German and Czech. The modern Czech name Višňová is an adjective derived from the Czech word višeň, i.e. 'sour cherry'. The municipality and village of Weigsdorf were renamed Višňová in 1948.

== Geography ==
Višňová is located about 21 kilometres (13 mi) north of Liberec, in a salient region of Frýdlant Hook on the border with Poland. It lies in the Jizera Foothills. The highest point is the hill Větrný at 384 m (1,260 ft) above sea level. The Smědá River flows through the municipality.

== History ==
The first written mention of Višňová is from 1334. It is the oldest settlement in the municipality. The youngest settlements are Filipovka and Minkovice, which were founded in the 18th century.

== Demographics ==
Historical population

Year	Pop.	±%
1869	3,000	—
1880	2,906	−3.1%
1890	2,808	−3.4%
1900	2,816	+0.3%
1910	2,940	+4.4%

Year	Pop.	±%
1921	3,029	+3.0%
1930	3,106	+2.5%
1950	1,861	−40.1%
1961	1,743	−6.3%
1970	1,662	−4.6%

Year	Pop.	±%
1980	1,543	−7.2%
1991	1,346	−12.8%
2001	1,338	−0.6%
2011	1,288	−3.7%
2021	1,288	+0.0%

Source: Censuses

== Transport ==
Višňová is located on the railway line Liberec–Černousy.

There are two pedestrian border crossings to Poland: Višňovská / Wigancice Żytawskie and Andělka / Lutogniewice.

== Sights ==
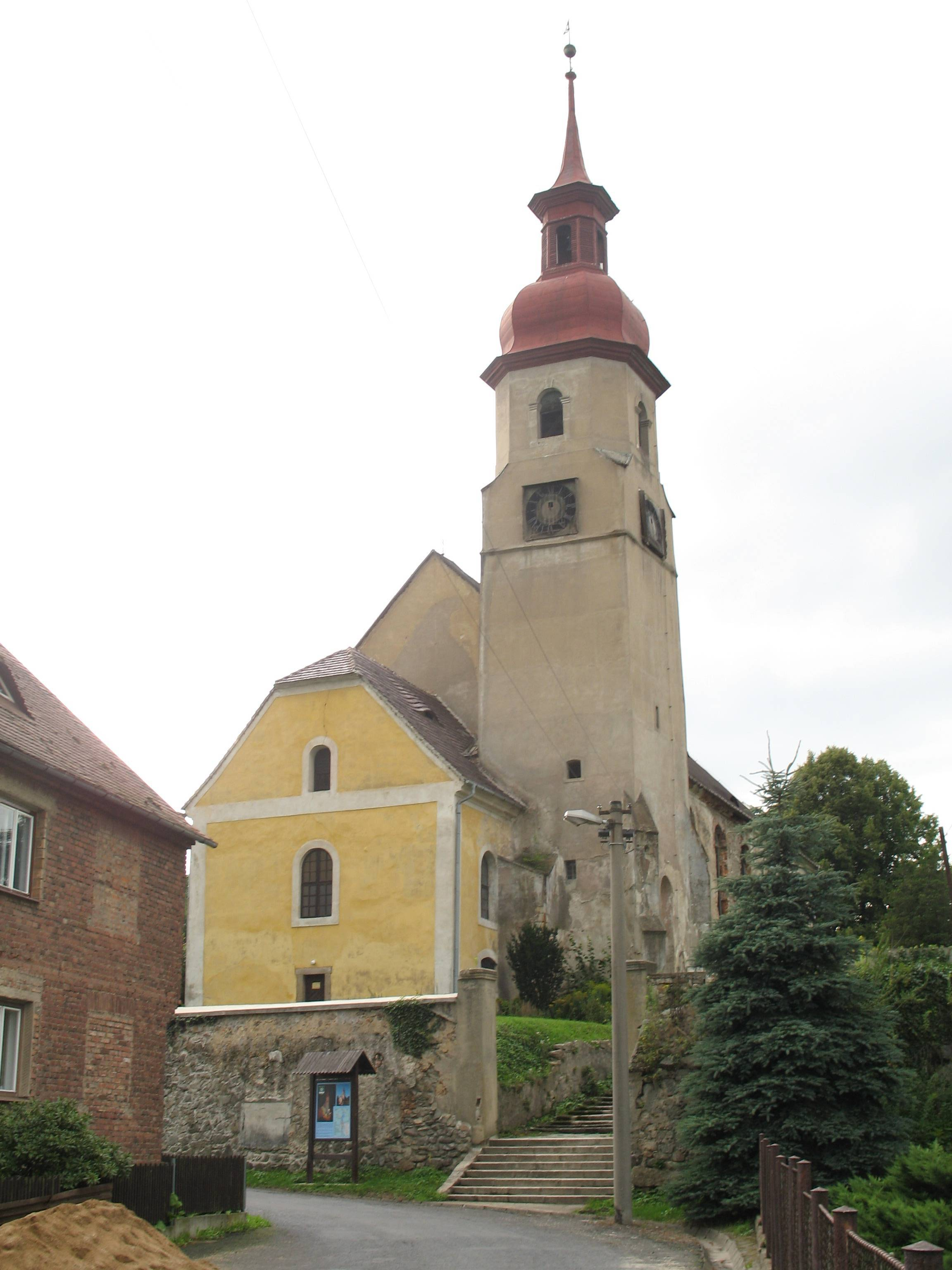
Church of the Sending of the Holy Spirit

The main landmark of Višňová is the Church of the Sending of the Holy Spirit. The church was built in 1492 and until 1945, it served evangelical services. A new nave was built in 1802–1803.

== Notable people ==
- Bedřich Fritta (1906–1944), graphic artist and caricaturist
