= Heinrich Karl Scholz =

Austrian sculptor (1880-1937)

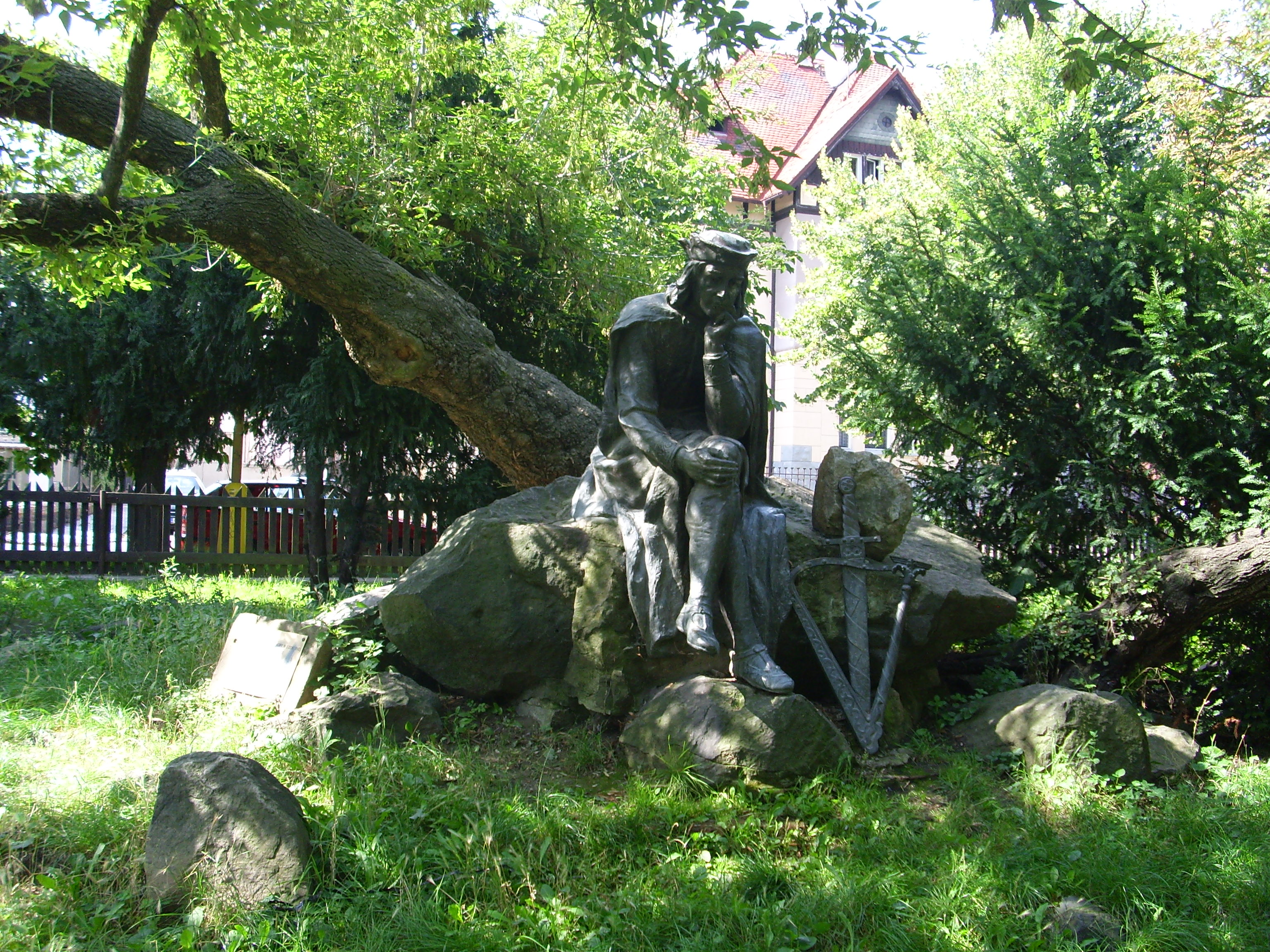
- Monument to Walther von der Vogelweide, Duchcov, (2008, most of the plants have since been removed)
- Born: 16 October 1880; Mildenau, Austria-Hungary
- Died: 12 June 1937 (aged 56); Vienna, Austria
- Occupation: Sculptor

Heinrich Karl Scholz (16 October 1880 – 12 June 1937) was an Austrian sculptor and medalist.

== Life and work ==
He initially studied porcelain processing and modeling at the Kunstgewerbeschulen in Haindorf and Reichenberg. He then studied sculpting at the Academy of Fine Arts, Vienna, with Hans Bitterlich and Edmund von Hellmer. In 1908, the Academy awarded him its Gundel-Prize for excellence. Following graduation he was able to make an extensive study trip to Italy, France, Belgium and Germany.

During World War I, he was commissioned to plan and create thirty-four war cemeteries and memorials inin the vicinity of Tarnów and Gorlice. As a result of this work, he was later elected board member of the Austrian Black Cross.

After the war, he worked as a freelance sculptor in Vienna. From there, he created several large sculptures for his home region. He also created numerous statuettes and medals that were reproduced in porcelain and bronze for many years after his death. Many were signed with the name "Karl von Mildenau".

From 1920 he was a member of the Vienna Künstlerhaus, and served as its Vice-President. His work was part of the art competitions at the 1936 Summer Olympics. That same year, he was named a Professor.

Some of his smaller works may be seen at the Kunsthistorisches Museum and the Heeresgeschichtliches Museum. He appears as a character (the sculptor "Scholc") in The Good Soldier Schweik, a novel by Jaroslav Hašek.
