= Smědá =

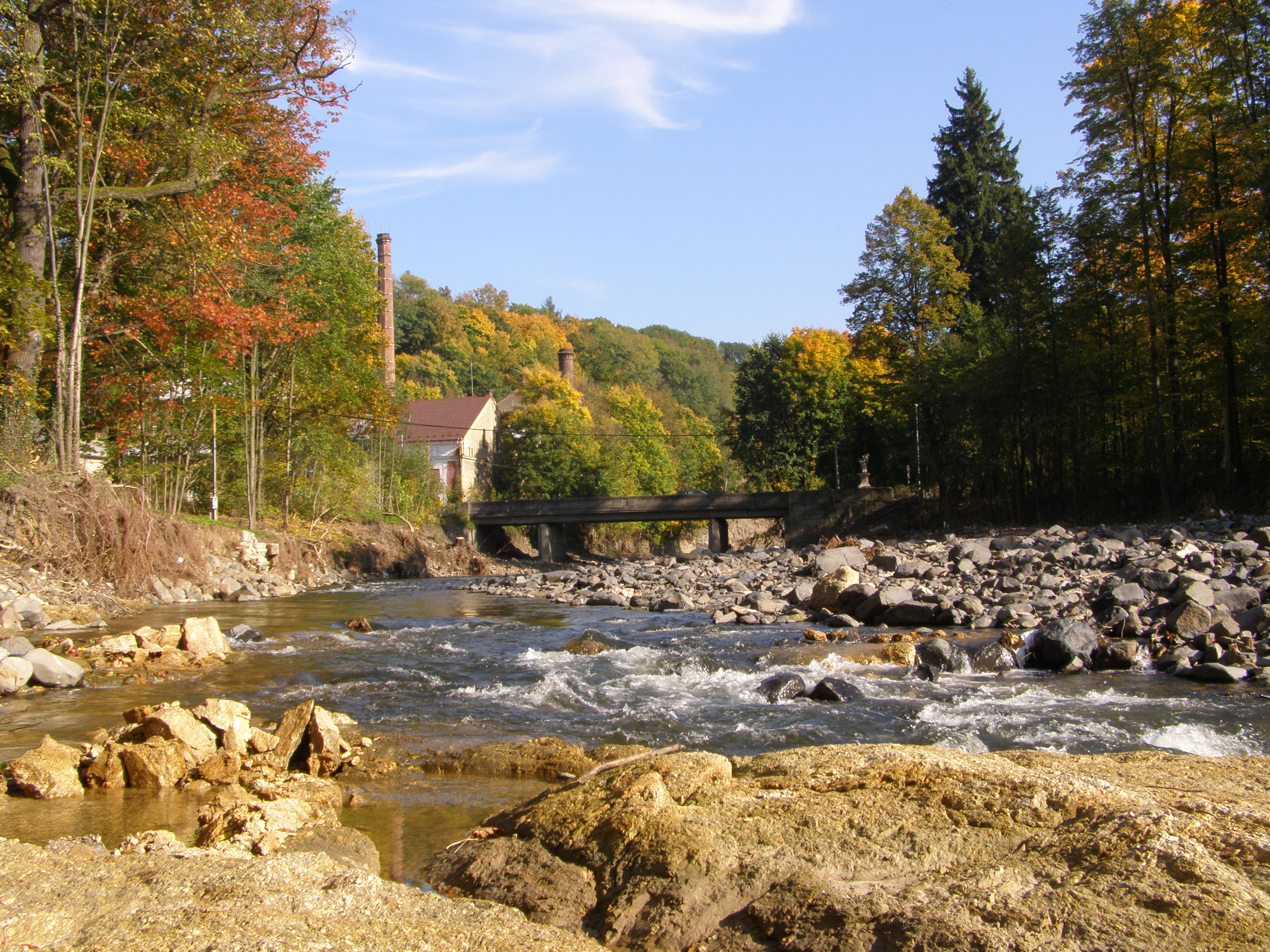
- The Smědá in Frýdlant

Location
- Countries: Czech Republic; Poland
- Regions/ Voivodeships: Liberec; Lower Silesian

Physical characteristics
- Source
  - location: Hejnice, Jizera Mountains
  - coordinates: 50°50′0″N 15°14′55″E
  - elevation: 1,000 m (3,300 ft)
- Mouth
  - location: Lusatian Neisse
  - coordinates: 51°3′0″N 14°57′52″E
  - elevation: 194 m (636 ft)
- Length: 55.3 km (34.4 mi)
- Basin size: 331 km^{2} (128 sq mi)
- Discharge
  - average: 4.21 m^{3}/s (149 cu ft/s) near the Czech–Polish border

Basin features
- Progression: Lusatian Neisse→ Oder→ Baltic Sea

The Smědá (Czech pronunciation: [ˈsmjɛdaː]; Polish: Witka, German: Wittig) is a river in the Czech Republic and Poland, a right tributary of the Lusatian Neisse River. It flows through the Liberec Region in the Czech Republic and then through Lower Silesian Voivodeship. Together with the Bílá Smědá, which is its main source, the Smědá is 55.3 km (34.4 mi) long. Without the Bílá Smědá, it is 51.9 km (32.2 mi) long.

== Etymology ==
The initial name of the river was Wietev, derived from the Slavic word for 'branch' (in modern Czech větev). The oldest mention of Wietev is from 1539. The German name Wittig was derived from this name. In 1951, the German name was replaced by Witka in Poland. The modern Czech name Smědá ('dark' in old Czech) is derived from the dark water which flows out of the peat bogs.

== Characteristic ==
The Smědá originates as Bílá Smědá in peat pogs in the territory of Hejnice in the Jizera Mountains at an elevation of exactly 1,000 m (3,300 ft). After it merges with the stream Černá Smědá (and from a broader point of view with the Hnědá Smědá, which joins the Černá Smědá) and further continues as Smědá. It flows to Radomierzyce, where it enters the Lusatian Neisse River at an elevation of 194 m (636 ft). Its total length is 55.3 km (34.4 mi). Without the Bílá Smědá, the Smědá is 51.9 km (32.2 mi) long, of which 47.8 km (29.7 mi) (including the Czech–Polish border) is in the Czech Republic. About 2.7 km (1.7 mi) forms the Czech–Polish state border. The drainage basin has an area of 331 km^{2} (128 sq mi), of which 251.3 km^{2} (97.0 sq mi) is in the Czech Republic.

The sources and longest tributaries of the Smědá are:

| Tributary | Length (km) | Side |
|---|---|---|
| Řasnice | 18.3 | right |
| Lomnice | 17.0 | right |
| Bulovský potok | 15.4 | right |
| Sloupský potok | 9.8 | left |
| Bílá Smědá | 3.4 | – |
| Černá Smědá | 2.5 | right |

== Course ==
The river flows through the territories of Hejnice, Bílý Potok, Raspenava, Frýdlant, Kunratice, Višňová and Černousy in the Czech Republic and Zawidów, Gmina Sulików and Gmina Zgorzelec in Poland.

== Bodies of water ==
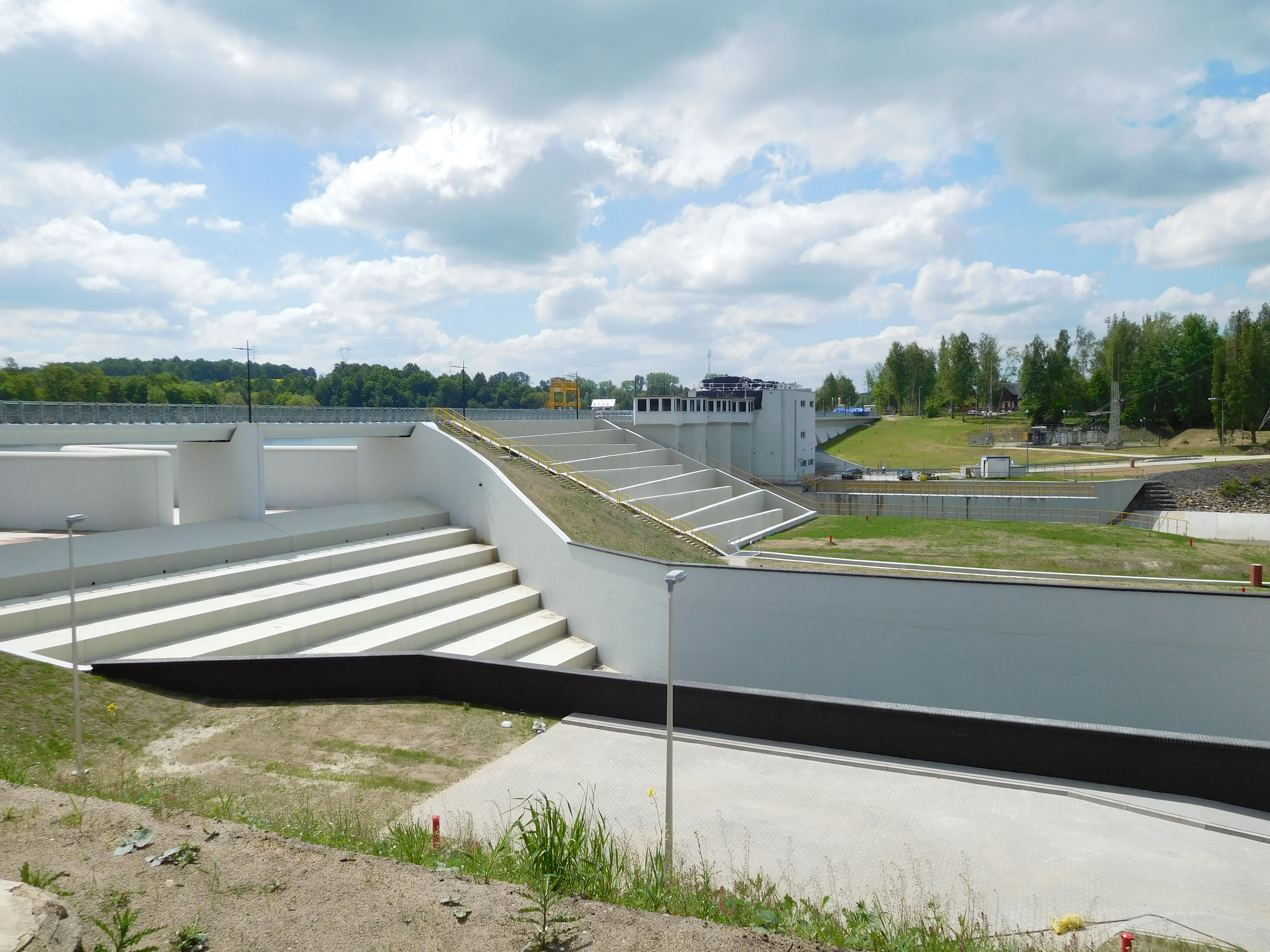
New dam of the Niedów Reservoir

In Poland, the Niedów Reservoir (also called Witka Reservoir) is constructed on the Smědá. It was built in 1958–1962 and is used as a recreational area. In 2010, the dam burst due to flash floods. The new dam was built in 2016.

== Nature ==
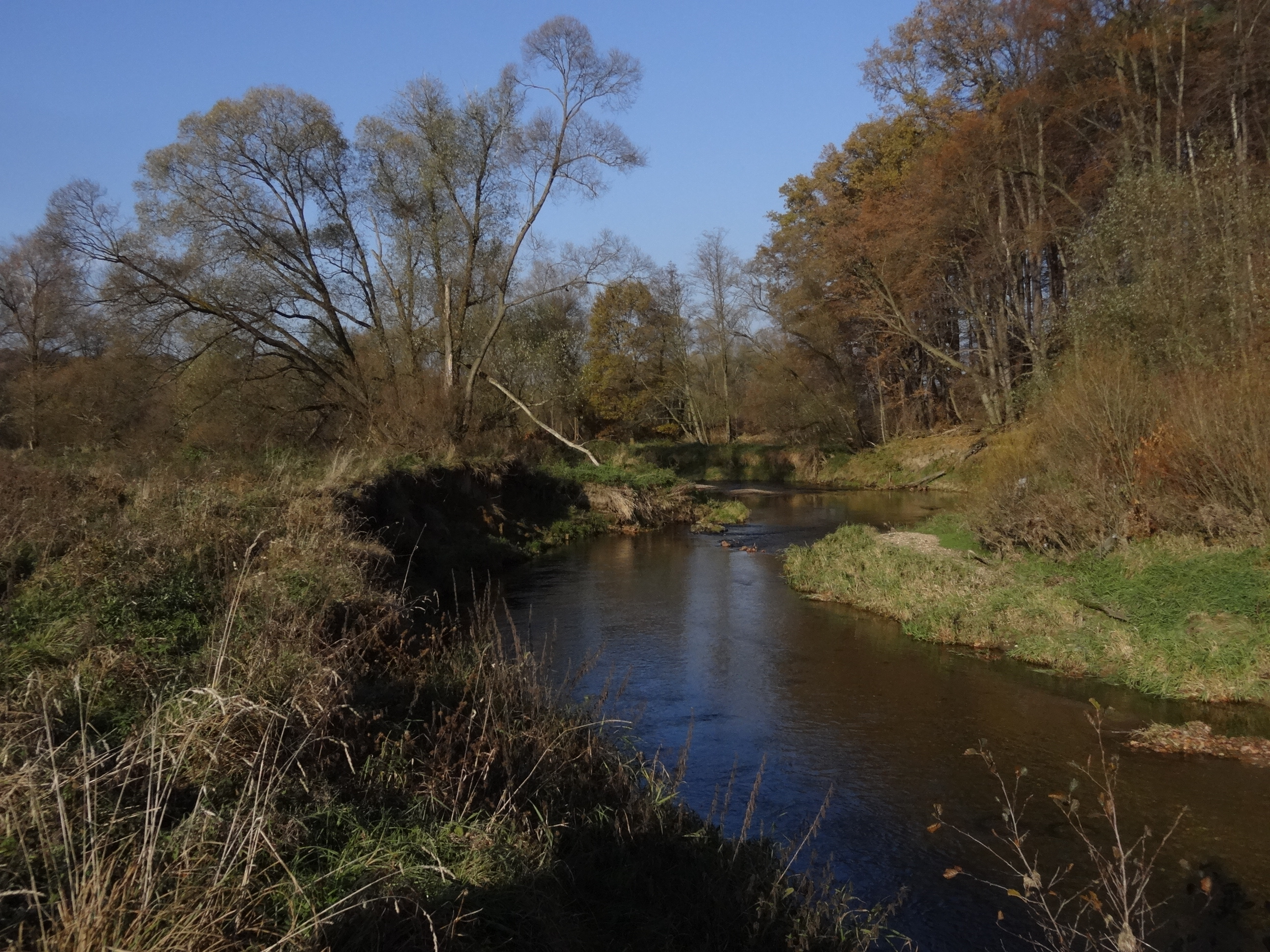
Meandry Smědé Nature Reserve

The final section of the river within the limits of the Czech Republic is protected as the Meandry Smědé ('Smědá meanders') Nature Reserve. It has an area of 136.6 ha (338 acres). The object of protection is the natural character of the river bed with meanders, pools and wet meadows, with a large number of protected plant and animal species. The wider area with a stretch of the river with a length of about 23 km (14 mi) is also protected as a Special Area of Conservation. The area is home to a population of the green snaketail, which is a protected species in the Czech Republic.

The fauna living in the river includes river trout, brook trout, European bullhead, burbot, Eurasian minnow and brook lamprey.

== See also ==
- List of rivers of the Czech Republic
- List of rivers of Poland
