= Kunratice (Liberec District) =

- Municipality
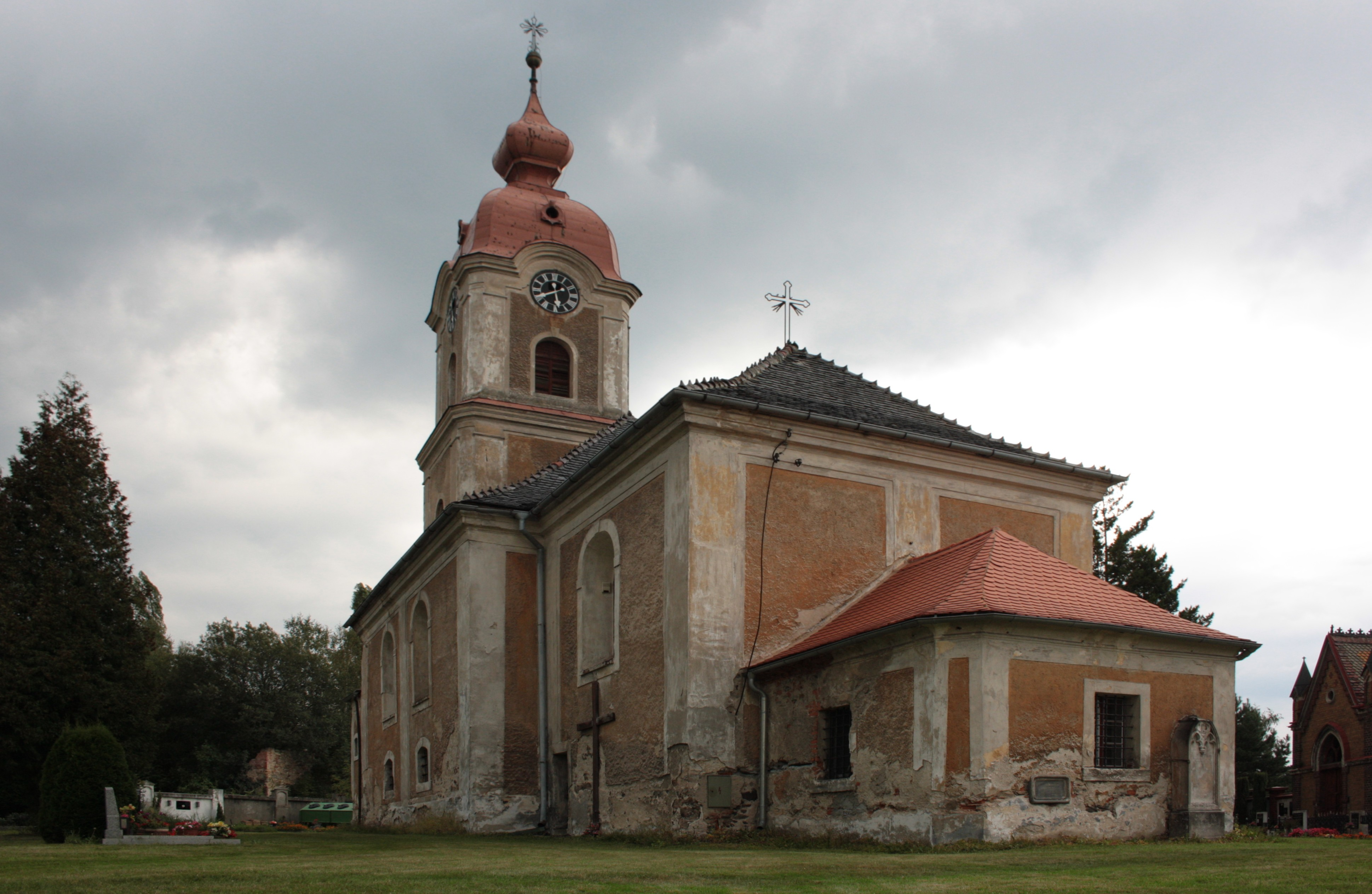
- Church of All Saints

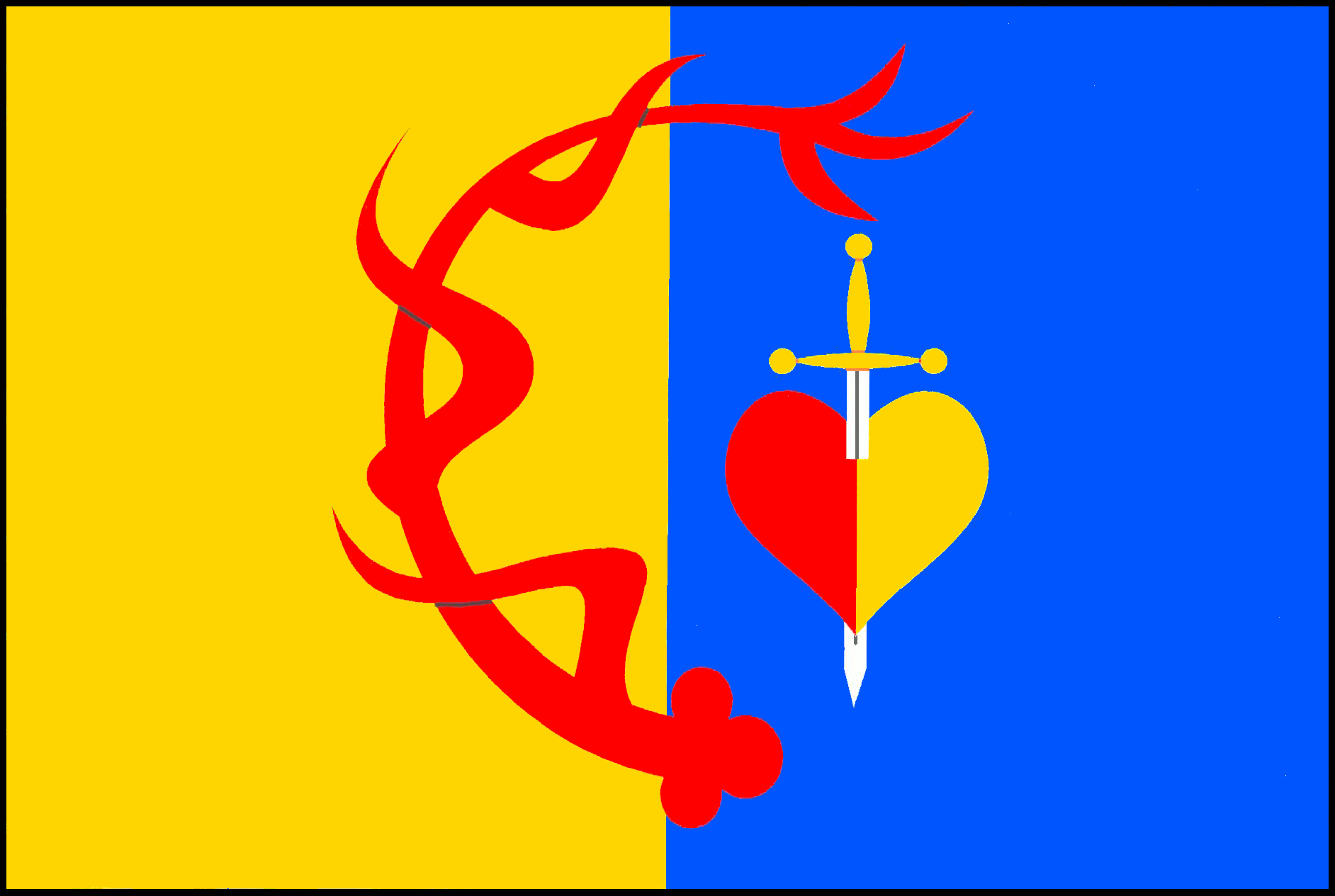
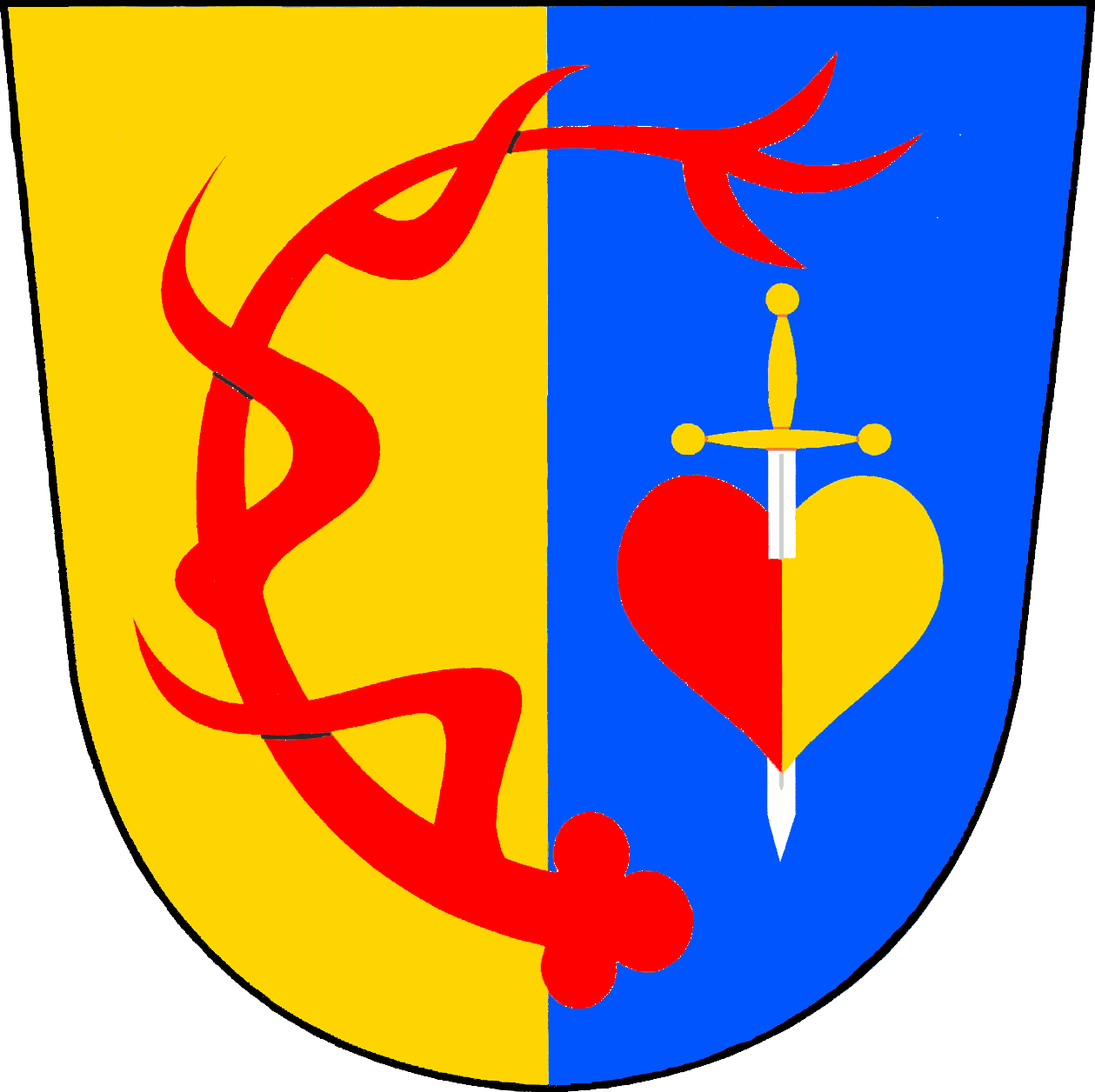
- Flag Coat of arms

- Location in the Czech Republic
- Coordinates: 50°55′17″N 15°1′34″E
- Country: Czech Republic
- Region: Liberec
- District: Liberec
- First mentioned: 1377

Area
  - Total: 12.42 km^{2} (4.80 sq mi)
- Elevation: 285 m (935 ft)

Population (2026-01-01)
  - Total: 350
  - Density: 28/km^{2} (73/sq mi)
- Time zone: UTC+1 (CET)
  - Summer (DST): UTC+2 (CEST)
- Postal code: 464 01
- Website: www.obeckunratice.cz

Kunratice (German: Kunnersdorf) is a municipality and village in Liberec District in the Liberec Region of the Czech Republic. It has about 400 inhabitants.

== Etymology ==
The name is derived from the personal name Kunrát (a Czech form of the German names Conrad and Konrad), meaning "the village of Kunrát's people".

== Geography ==
Kunratice is located about 16 kilometres (10 mi) north of Liberec, in a salient region of Frýdlant Hook on the border with Poland. It lies in the Jizera Foothills. The highest point is a hill at 382 m (1,253 ft) above sea level. The municipality is situated on the left bank of the Smědá River, which flows along the northeastern municipal border.

== History ==
The first settlers came to the area at the turn of the 12th and 13th centuries. The first written mention of Kunratice is from 1377.

== Demographics ==
Historical population

Year	Pop.	±%
1869	741	—
1880	773	+4.3%
1890	790	+2.2%
1900	833	+5.4%
1910	804	−3.5%

Year	Pop.	±%
1921	712	−11.4%
1930	642	−9.8%
1950	416	−35.2%
1961	503	+20.9%
1970	446	−11.3%

Year	Pop.	±%
1980	420	−5.8%
1991	390	−7.1%
2001	387	−0.8%
2011	391	+1.0%
2021	365	−6.6%

Source: Censuses

== Transport ==
On the Czech–Polish border is a road border crossing Kunratice / Bogatynia.

== Sights ==
The main landmark of Kunratice is the Church of All Saints. The originally Gothic church was first documented in 1376. It was completely rebuilt in the Baroque style in the 18th century, but several original elements have been preserved.

== Twin towns – sister cities ==
Kunratice is twinned with:

- Pieńsk, Poland
