= Raspenava =

- Town
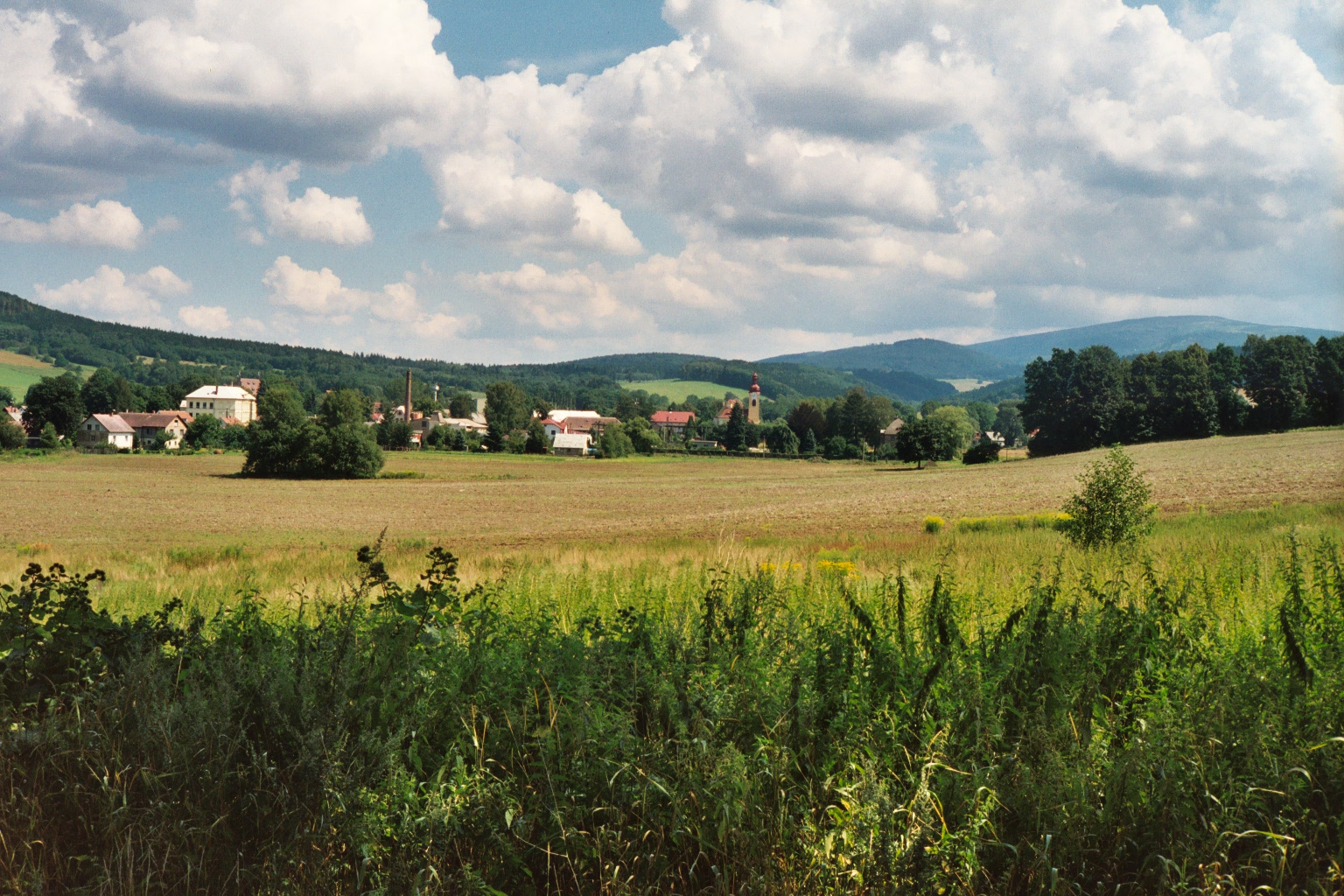
- View of Raspenava

- Coat of arms

- Location in the Czech Republic
- Coordinates: 50°54′15″N 15°6′53″E
- Country: Czech Republic
- Region: Liberec
- District: Liberec
- First mentioned: 1343

Government
  - Mayor: Josef Málek

Area
  - Total: 41.28 km^{2} (15.94 sq mi)
- Elevation: 331 m (1,086 ft)

Population (2026-01-01)
  - Total: 2,784
  - Density: 67.44/km^{2} (174.7/sq mi)
- Time zone: UTC+1 (CET)
  - Summer (DST): UTC+2 (CEST)
- Postal code: 463 61
- Website: raspenava.cz

Raspenava (Czech pronunciation: [ˈraspɛnava]; German: Raspenau) is a town in Liberec District in the Liberec Region of the Czech Republic. It has about 2,800 inhabitants.

== Etymology ==
The original German name Raspenau was derived from the personal name Raspe and meant "Raspe's floodplain". The Czech name was created by transcription of the German name.

== Geography ==
Raspenava is located about 15 kilometres (9 mi) north of Liberec, in the salient region of Frýdlant Hook. It lies mostly in the Jizera Foothills. The southern part of the municipal territory extends into the Jizera Mountains and includes the highest point of Raspenava, located below the top of the mountain Poledník at 858 m (2,815 ft) above sea level. The Smědá River flows through the town.

Two thirds of the territory are situated in the Jizerské hory Protected Landscape Area. Half of the Czech part of the UNESCO World Heritage Site named Ancient and Primeval Beech Forests of the Carpathians and Other Regions of Europe is situated in the southernmost part of the territory of Raspenava.

== History ==
The first written mention of Raspenava is from 1343. The village was located on the left bank of the Smědá River, and there were several small hamlets on the right bank. Raspenava was originally an agricultural village, but its character began to change in the 16th century. In 1512, a hammer mill was built here, and later an ironworks and a lime factory were established.

In 1962, the settlements were merged into the town of Raspenava.

== Demographics ==
Historical population

| Year | Pop. | ±% |
|---|---|---|
| 1869 | 4,012 | — |
| 1880 | 4,179 | +4.2% |
| 1890 | 4,266 | +2.1% |
| 1900 | 4,647 | +8.9% |
| 1910 | 4,764 | +2.5% |

| Year | Pop. | ±% |
|---|---|---|
| 1921 | 4,262 | −10.5% |
| 1930 | 4,359 | +2.3% |
| 1950 | 3,012 | −30.9% |
| 1961 | 3,197 | +6.1% |
| 1970 | 3,106 | −2.8% |

| Year | Pop. | ±% |
|---|---|---|
| 1980 | 2,963 | −4.6% |
| 1991 | 2,708 | −8.6% |
| 2001 | 2,847 | +5.1% |
| 2011 | 2,801 | −1.6% |
| 2021 | 2,730 | −2.5% |

Source: Censuses

== Transport ==
Raspenava is located on the railway lines heading from Liberec to Jindřichovice pod Smrkem and to Černousy, and is the starting point of a short line of local importance to Bílý Potok.

== Sights ==
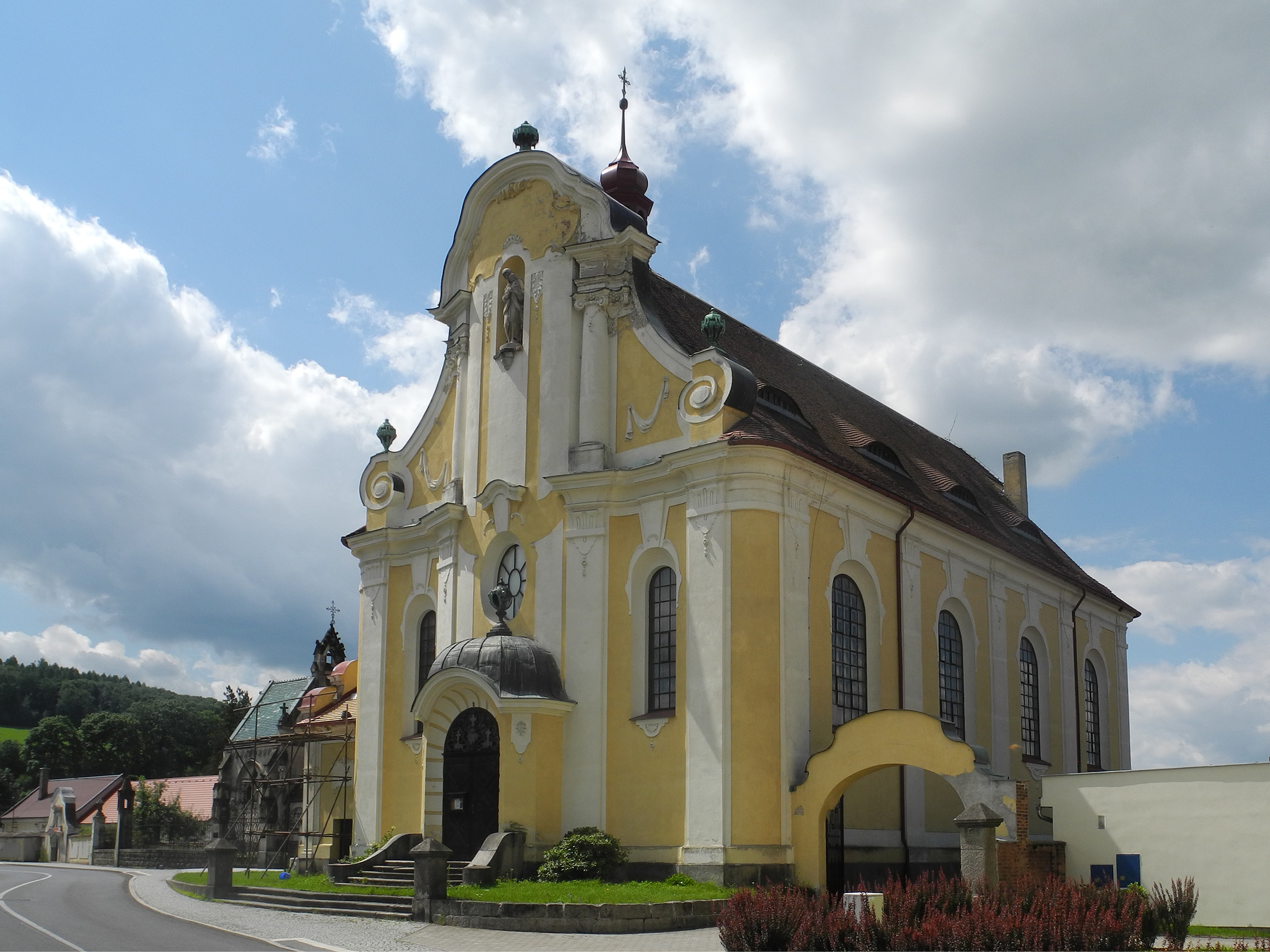
Church of the Assumption of the Virgin Mary

The main landmark of Raspenava is the Church of the Assumption of the Virgin Mary. It was built in the neo-Baroque style in 1906–1907.

== Notable people ==
- Heinrich Karl Scholz (1880–1937), Austrian sculptor and medalist

== Twin towns – sister cities ==
Raspenava is twinned with:

- Bischofswerda, Germany
- Gryfów Śląski, Poland
