= Hejnice (Liberec District) =

- Town
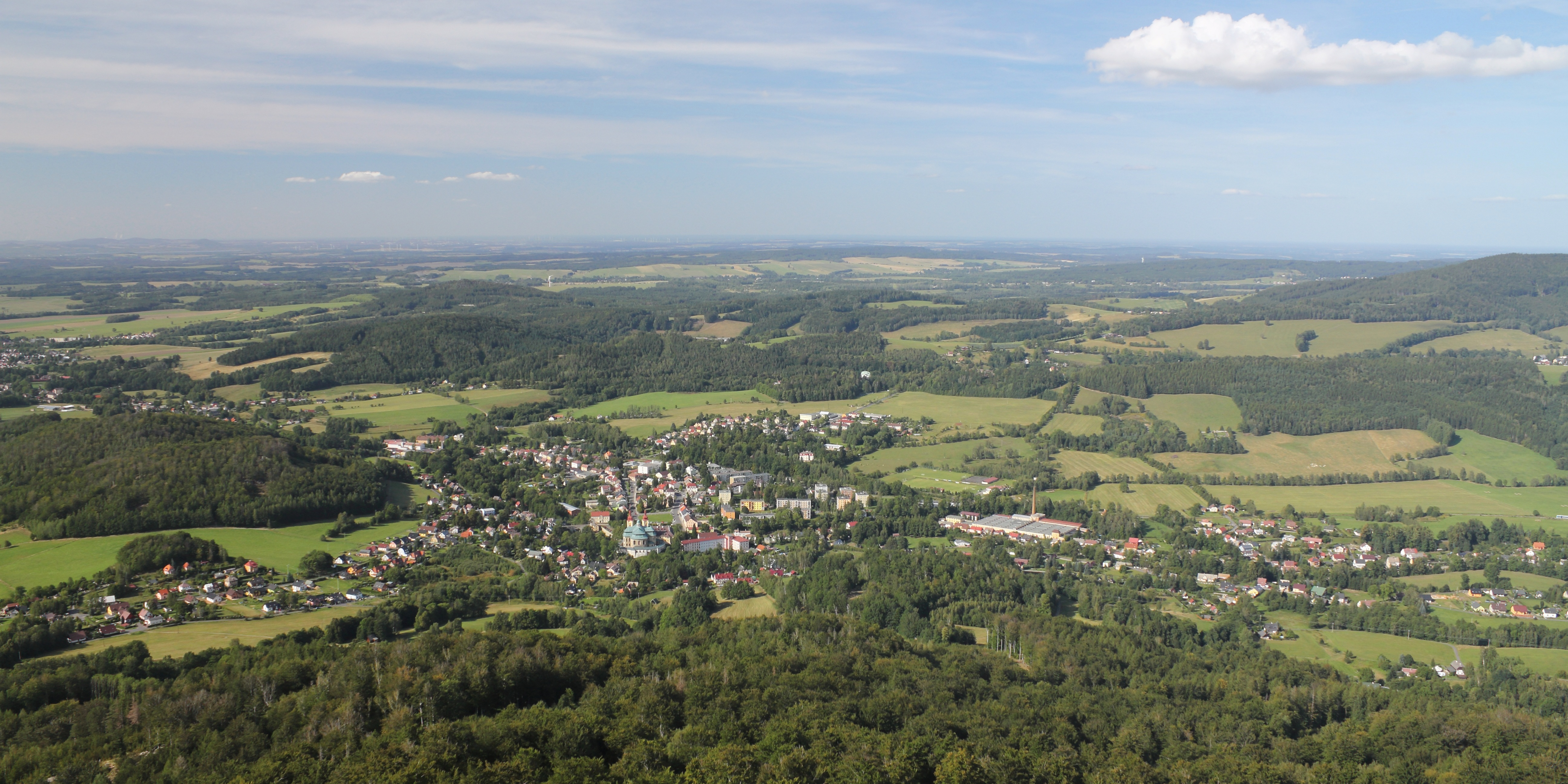
- View from the south

- Flag Coat of arms

- Location in the Czech Republic
- Coordinates: 50°52′38″N 15°11′54″E
- Country: Czech Republic
- Region: Liberec
- District: Liberec
- First mentioned: 1381

Government
  - Mayor: Jaroslav Demčák

Area
  - Total: 38.41 km^{2} (14.83 sq mi)
- Elevation: 375 m (1,230 ft)

Population (2026-01-01)
  - Total: 2,726
  - Density: 70.97/km^{2} (183.8/sq mi)
- Time zone: UTC+1 (CET)
  - Summer (DST): UTC+2 (CEST)
- Postal code: 463 62
- Website: www.mestohejnice.cz

Hejnice (Czech pronunciation: [ˈɦɛjɲɪtsɛ]; German: Haindorf) is a town in Liberec District in the Liberec Region of the Czech Republic. It has about 2,700 inhabitants. The town is located on the Smědá River in the Jizera Mountains.

== Administrative division ==
Hejnice consists of two municipal parts (in brackets population according to the 2021 census):

- Hejnice (2,360)
- Ferdinandov (274)

== Etymology ==
The original German name of the village Haindorf is based on the German Dorf im Haine, which means 'village in the grove'. The Czech name was derived from the German one and from háj, i.e. 'grove'.

== Geography ==
Hejnice is located about 14 kilometres (9 mi) northeast of Liberec. It lies in the valley of the Smědá River under the northern slopes of the Jizera Mountains. The northernmost part of the municipal territory lies in the Jizera Foothills. The highest peak is the Jizera Mountain at 1,122 m (3,681 ft) above sea level.

The entire territory of Hejnice is situated in the Jizerské hory Protected Landscape Area. Half of the Czech part of the UNESCO World Heritage Site named Ancient and Primeval Beech Forests of the Carpathians and Other Regions of Europe is situated in the territory of Hejnice.

== History ==
According to legend, a pilgrimage church was founded here already in 1211. The first written mention of Hejnice is from 1381. In the 16th century, iron ore mines were opened. In 1692, Count František Gallas established a Franciscan monastery, which helped the visibility of the village. In the 19th century, several textile factories were established in the village and its surroundings. The village of Hejnice was promoted to a town in 1917.

In 1938, Hejnice was annexed by Nazi Germany. From 1938 to 1945, it was administered as part of the Reichsgau Sudetenland.

== Demographics ==
Historical population

Year	Pop.	±%
1869	2,497	—
1880	2,992	+19.8%
1890	3,310	+10.6%
1900	3,491	+5.5%
1910	3,402	−2.5%

Year	Pop.	±%
1921	2,966	−12.8%
1930	2,831	−4.6%
1950	2,005	−29.2%
1961	2,256	+12.5%
1970	2,057	−8.8%

Year	Pop.	±%
1980	2,549	+23.9%
1991	2,537	−0.5%
2001	2,704	+6.6%
2011	2,696	−0.3%
2021	2,634	−2.3%

Source: Censuses

== Transport ==
Hejnice is located on a short railway line of local importance from Raspenava to Bílý Potok.

== Sights ==
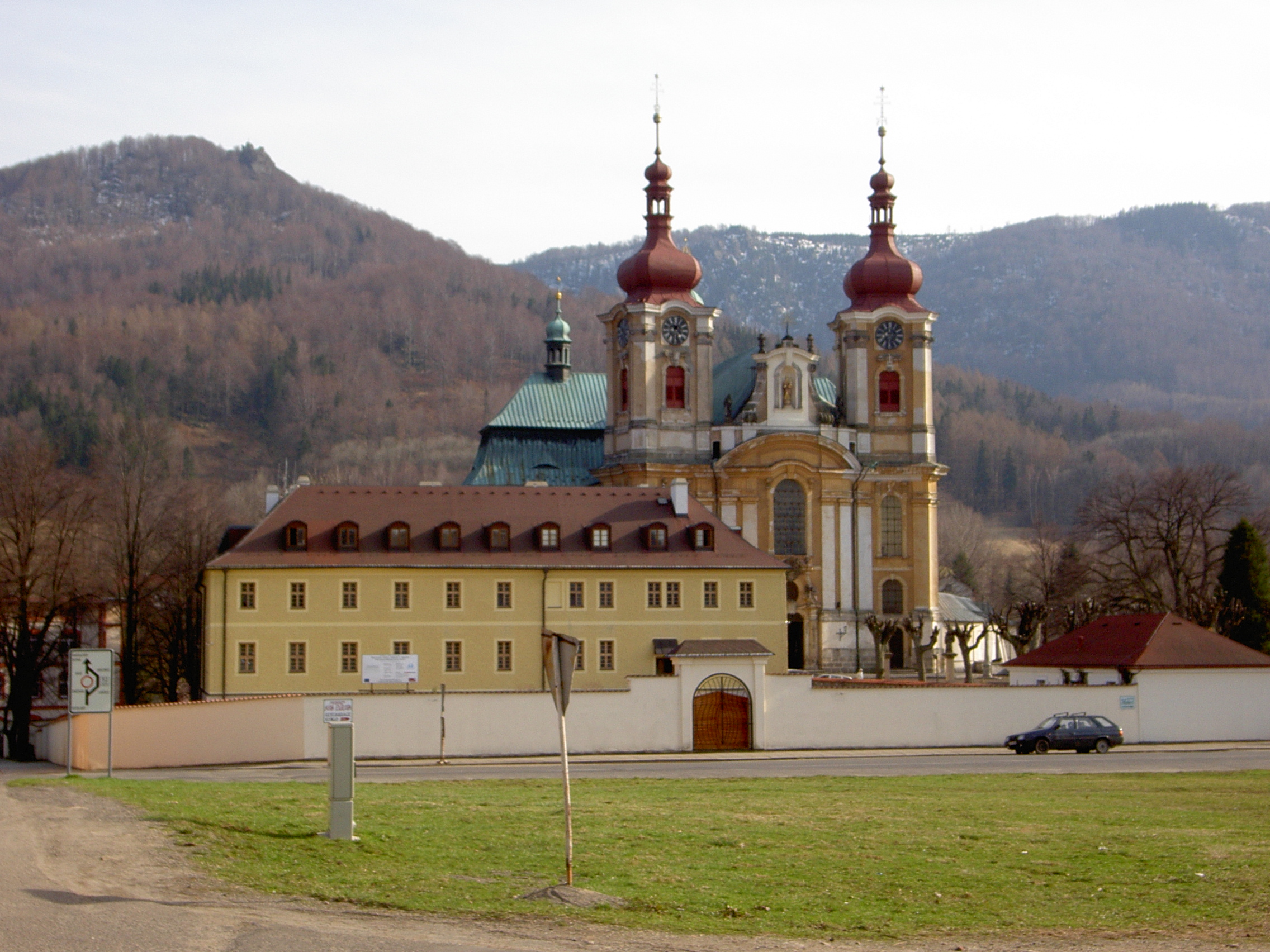
Church of the Visitation and former Franciscan monastery

The former Franciscan monastery and its pilgrimage Church of the Visitation are the most valuable buildings in Hejnice. Today the monastery premises are used for cultural and social purposes and provide accommodation.

The Church of the Visitation was originally a small wooden church from the 14th century, which was gradually expanded. The most valuable object is a wooden Gothic sculpture of the Black Madonna from 1380. In front of the church stands the Marian column from 1695.

== Notable people ==
- Oskar Romm (1919–1993), German flying ace
- Katharina Matz (1935–2021), German actress
- Jürgen Kocka (born 1941), German historian

== Twin towns – sister cities ==
Hejnice is twinned with:

- Łęknica, Poland
