= Alexander Bittner =

Austrian paleontologist and geologist

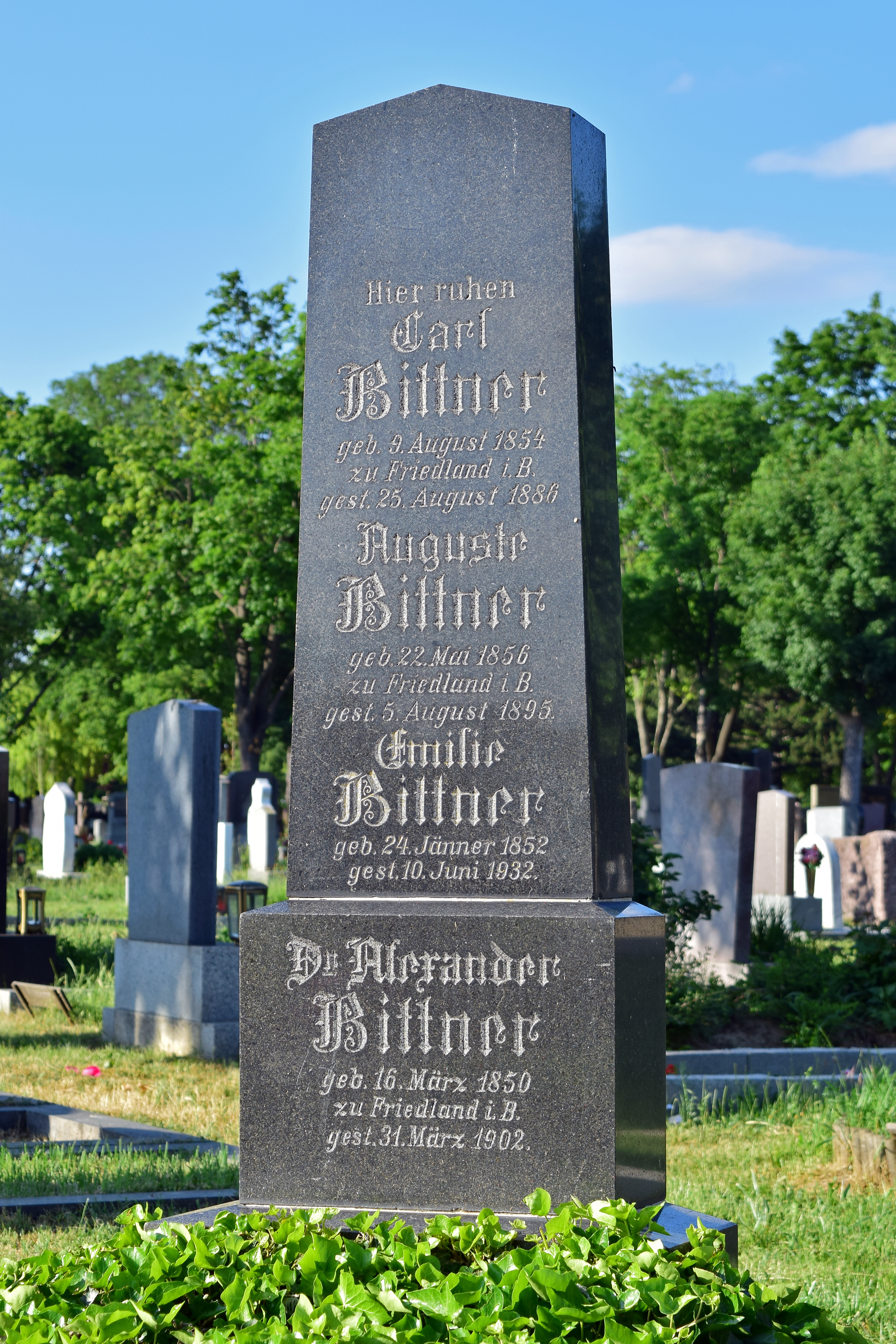
Grave of Alexander Bittner at the Wiener Zentralfriedhof

Alexander Bittner (16 March 1850 in Friedland – 31 March 1902 in Vienna) was an Austrian paleontologist and geologist.

Following graduation from the University of Vienna in 1873, he remained in Vienna as an assistant to Eduard Suess. In 1874-76 he conducted geological research in Italy and Greece, followed by an internship at the Imperial Institute of Geology in Vienna (1877). In 1897 he was appointed chief geologist of the institute.

Bittner is known for his stratigraphic-paleontological research of the eastern Alps, especially studies involving brachiopods from the Alpine Triassic Period. He was among the first scientists to study the effects of the Belluno earthquake that occurred in northern Italy on 29 June 1873.

== Selected works ==
- Vorschläge für eine Normirung der Regeln der stratigraphischen Nomenclatur, 1879 - Proposal for a normalization of rules for stratigraphic nomenclature.
- Die geologischen verhältnisse von Hernstein in Niederosterreich und der weiteren umgebung, 1882 - Geological conditions of Hernstein in Lower Austria, etc.
- Beiträge zur Kenntniss tertiärer Brachyuren-Faunen, 1884 - Contribution to the knowledge of Tertiary Brachyura.
- Brachiopoden der Alpinen Trias, 1890 - Brachiopods of the Alpine Triassic.
- Neue Koninckiniden des alpinen Lias, 1893 - New Koninckiniden of the Alpine Lias.
- Lamellibranchiaten der Alpinen Trias, 1895 - Lamellibranchia of the Alpine Triassic.
