= Karolína Bednářová =

Czech volleyball player (born 1986)

Karolína Bednárová
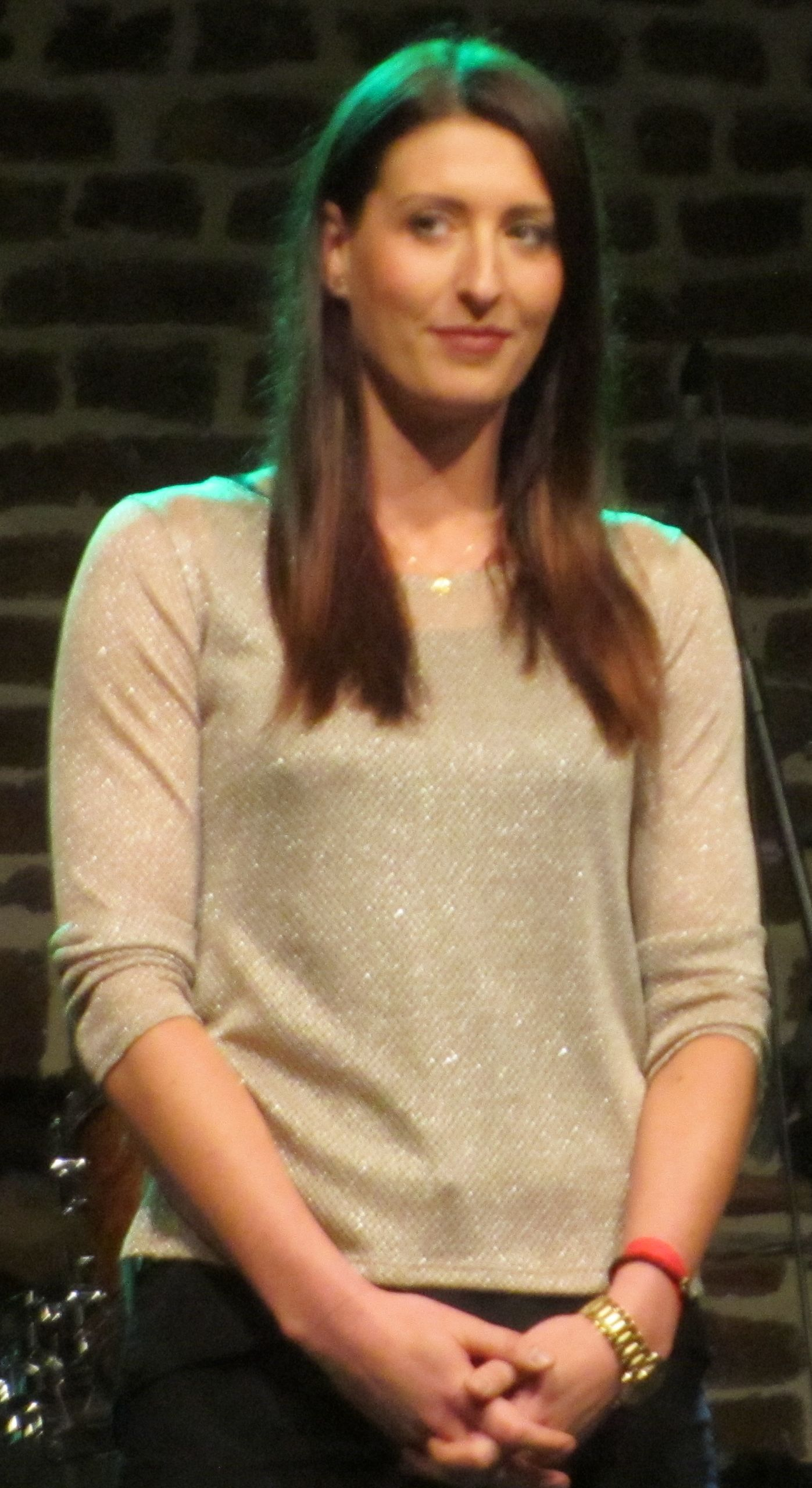

Personal information
- Nationality: Czech
- Born: 20 July 1986 (age 40); Frýdlant, Czech Republic
- Height: 183 cm (72 in)
- Weight: 65 kg (143 lb)
- Spike: 305 cm (120 in)
- Block: 299 cm (118 in)

Volleyball information
- Number: 12 (national team)

Career
| Years | Teams |
|---|---|
| 2013 | PTSV Aachen |

National team
| 2013 | Czech Republic |

Karolína Bednárová (born 20 July 1986) is a Czech female volleyball player. She was part of the Czech Republic women's national volleyball team.

She participated in the 2013 FIVB Volleyball World Grand Prix. On club level she played for PTSV Aachen in 2013.
