= Černousy =

- Municipality
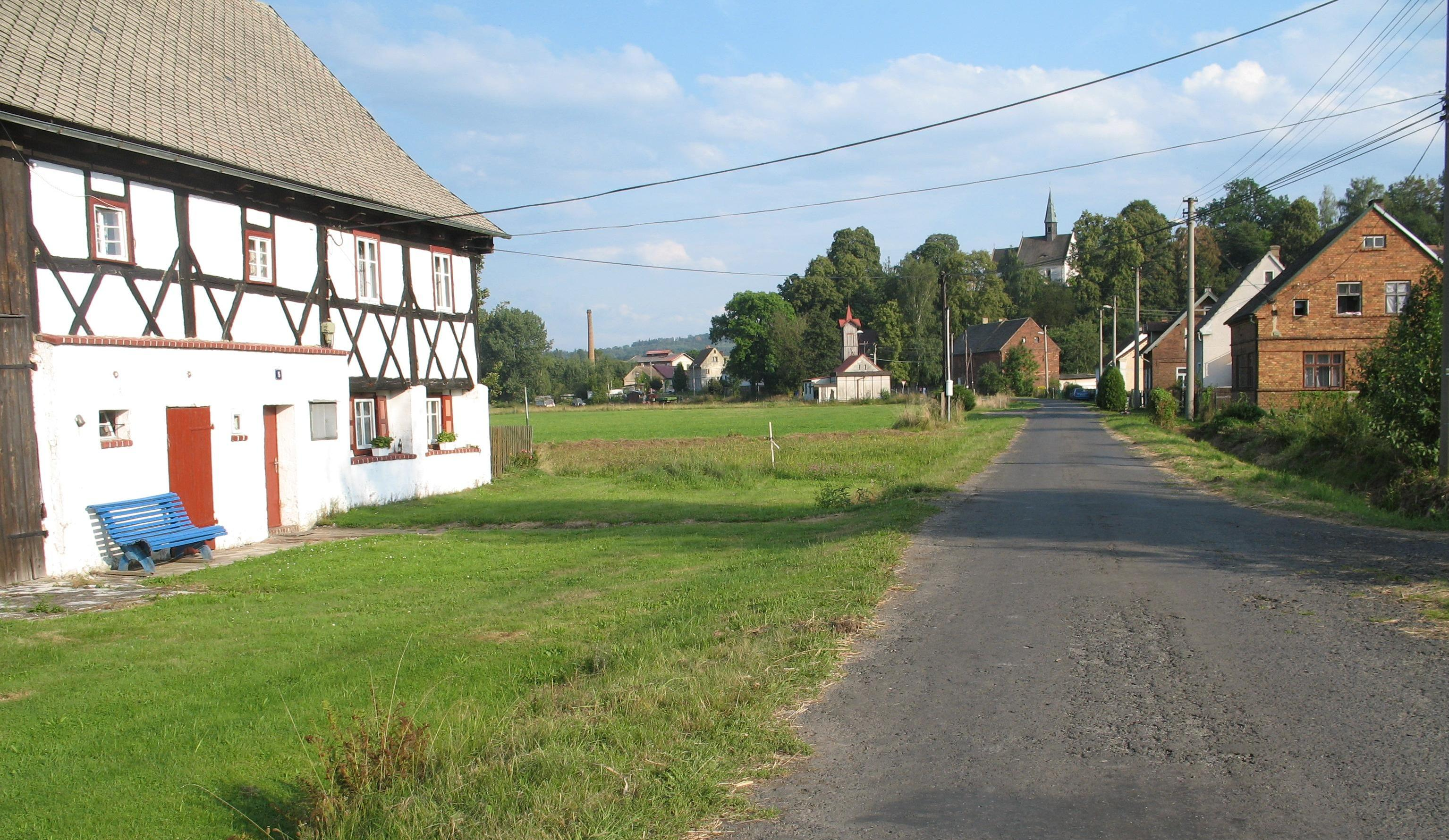
- Ves, a part of Černousy

- Flag Coat of arms

- Location in the Czech Republic
- Coordinates: 51°0′16″N 15°3′2″E
- Country: Czech Republic
- Region: Liberec
- District: Liberec
- First mentioned: 1385

Area
  - Total: 8.57 km^{2} (3.31 sq mi)
- Elevation: 263 m (863 ft)

Population (2026-01-01)
  - Total: 312
  - Density: 36.4/km^{2} (94.3/sq mi)
- Time zone: UTC+1 (CET)
  - Summer (DST): UTC+2 (CEST)
- Postal code: 463 73
- Website: www.cernousy.cz

Černousy (German: Tschernhausen) is a municipality and village in Liberec District in the Liberec Region of the Czech Republic. It has about 300 inhabitants.

== Administrative division ==
Černousy consists of three municipal parts (in brackets population according to the 2021 census):

- Černousy (160)
- Boleslav (75)
- Ves (77)

== Etymology ==
It is believed that the name is of Slavic origin and may have originated from the word črnousi ('people with black beards').

== Geography ==
Černousy is located about 25 kilometres (16 mi) north of Liberec, in a salient region of Frýdlant Hook on the border with Poland. It lies in the Jizera Foothills. The highest point is the Štemberk hill at 340 m (1,120 ft) above sea level. The Smědá River flows through the municipality.

== History ==
The first written mention of Černousy is from 1385.

== Demographics ==
Historical population

Year	Pop.	±%
1869	801	—
1880	811	+1.2%
1890	774	−4.6%
1900	789	+1.9%
1910	845	+7.1%

Year	Pop.	±%
1921	791	−6.4%
1930	723	−8.6%
1950	466	−35.5%
1961	428	−8.2%
1970	386	−9.8%

Year	Pop.	±%
1980	367	−4.9%
1991	327	−10.9%
2001	330	+0.9%
2011	334	+1.2%
2021	312	−6.6%

Source: Censuses

== Transport ==
On the Czech–Polish border are two border crossings: the railway border crossing Frýdlant v Čechách / Zawidów and the road border crossing Černousy – Ves / Zawidów.

Černousy is the final station and starting point of the railway line Liberec–Černousy.

== Sights ==
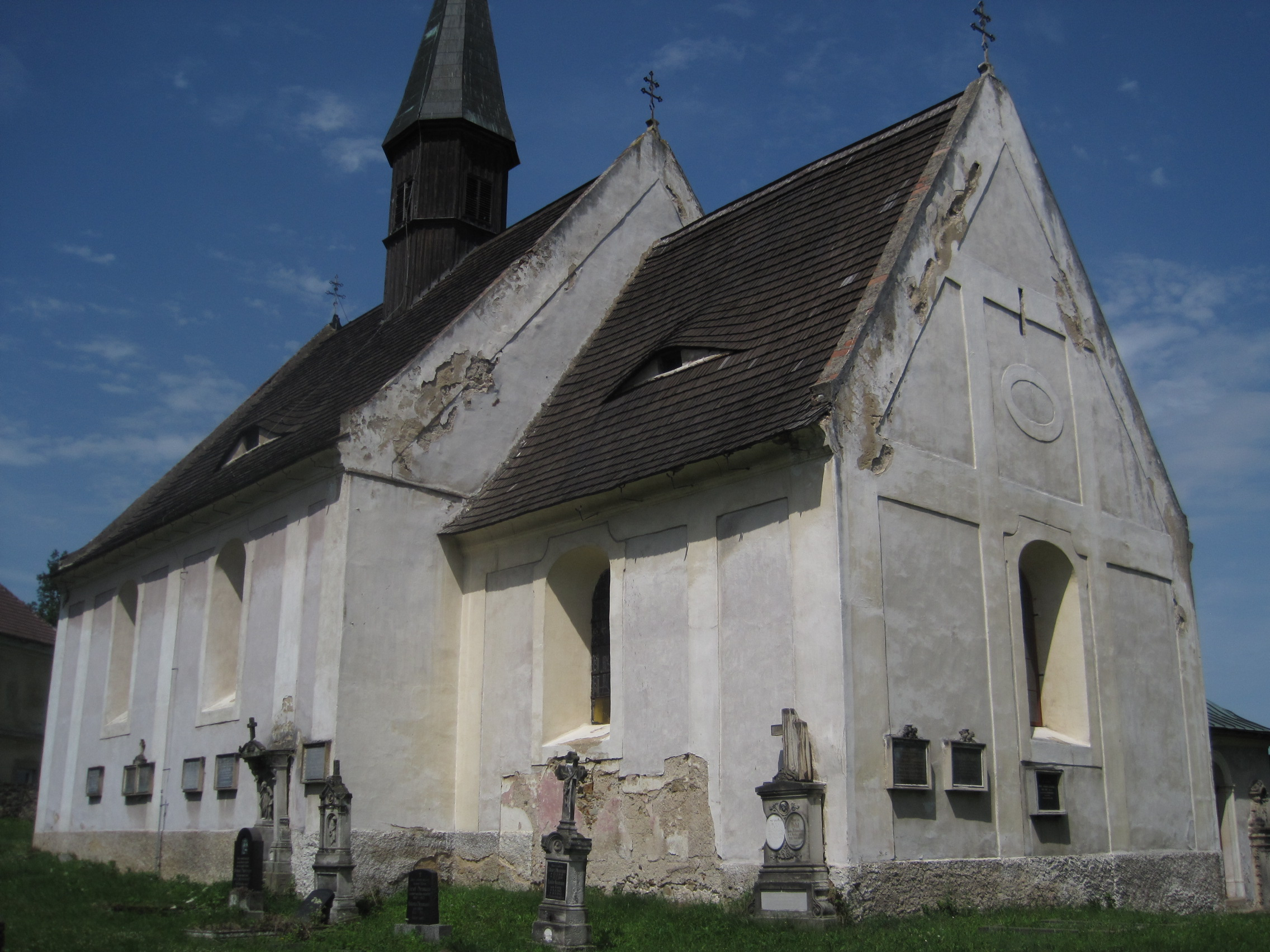
Church of Saint Lawrence

The most notable building is the Church of Saint Lawrence in Ves. It is a late Gothic church, which was first documented in 1346 and rebuilt in 1519.
