= Zawidów =

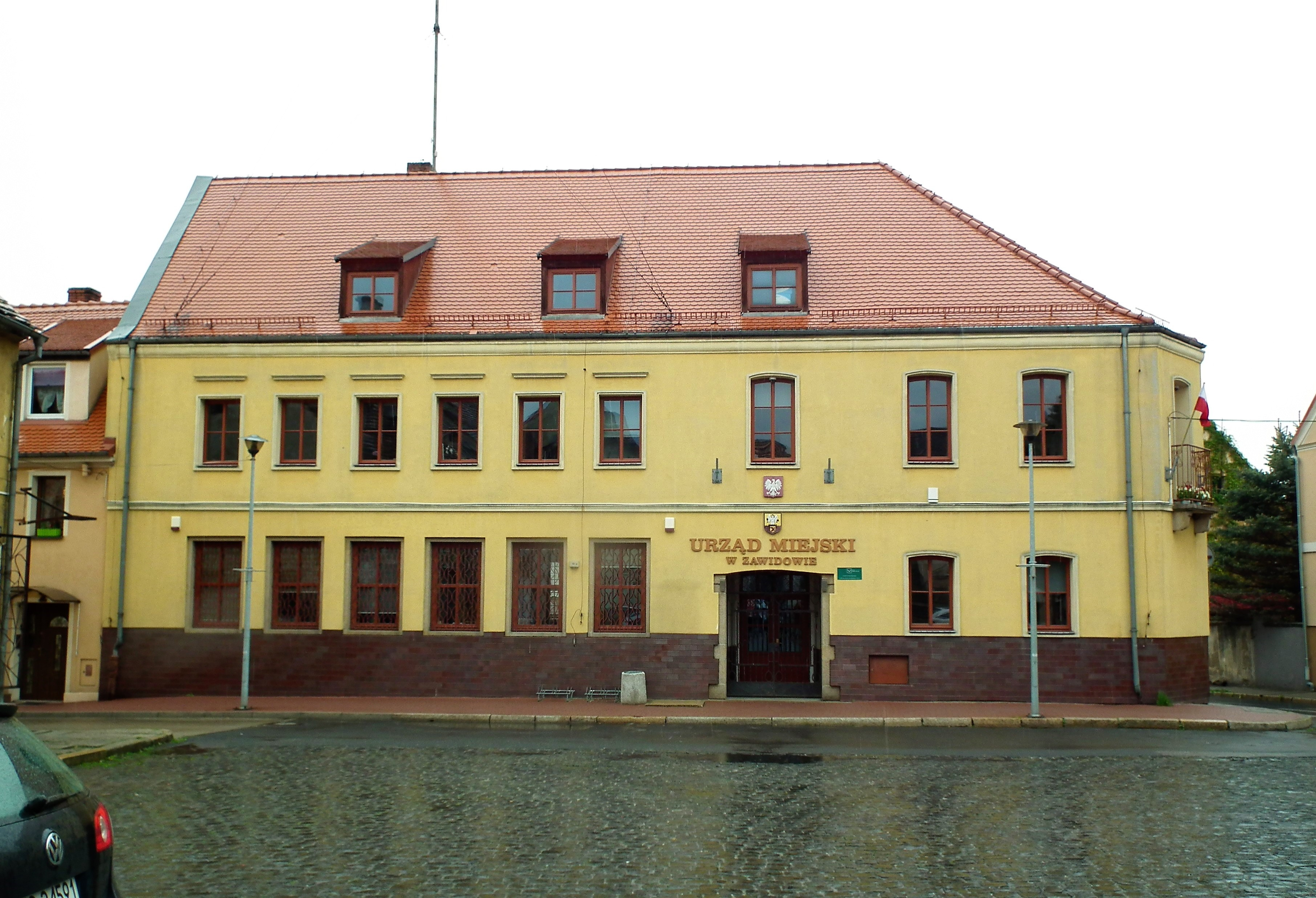
- Zawidów Town Hall

- Coat of arms

- Location within Poland
- Coordinates: 51°1′N 15°4′E
- Country: Poland
- Voivodeship: Lower Silesian
- County: Zgorzelec
- Gmina: Zawidów (urban gmina)
- First mentioned: 1186
- Town rights: 1369

Government
  - Mayor: Robert Łężny

Area
  - Total: 6.07 km^{2} (2.34 sq mi)
- Elevation: 245 m (804 ft)

Population (2019-06-30)
  - Total: 4,180
  - Density: 701.6/km^{2} (1,817/sq mi)
- Time zone: UTC+1 (CET)
  - Summer (DST): UTC+2 (CEST)
- Postal code: 59-970
- Area code: +48 75
- Vehicle registration: DZG
- Website: https://www.zawidow.info

Zawidów [zaˈvʲiduf] (German: Seidenberg) is a town in Zgorzelec County, Lower Silesian Voivodeship, in south-western Poland, at the Czech border. As of 2019, the town had a population of 4,180.

== History ==
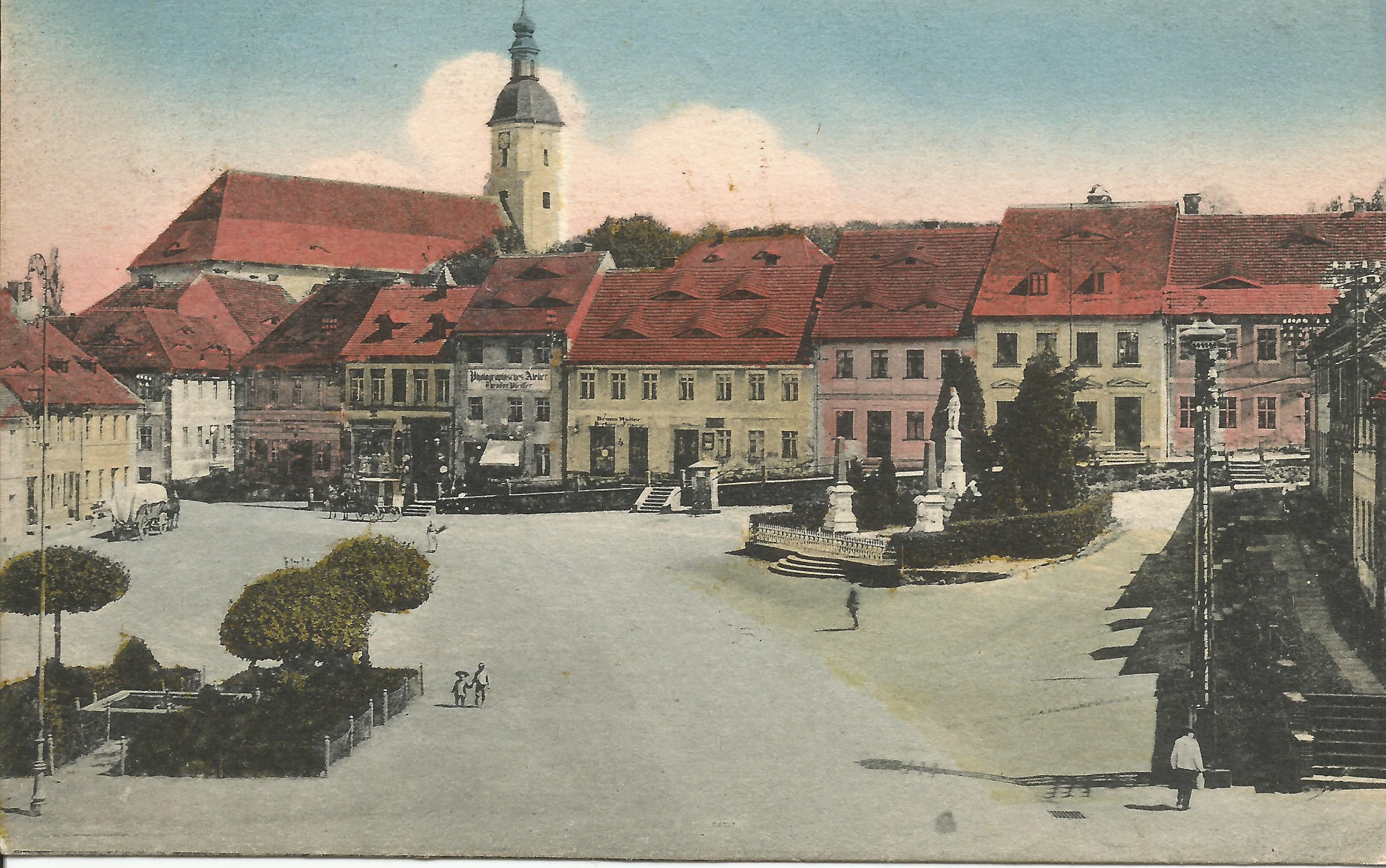
Pre-1914 view of the Market Square

In the Early Middle Ages, Zawidów was a stronghold of the Bieżuńczanie tribe, one of the old Polish tribes. In the early 11th century it was included in the early Polish state by Bolesław I the Brave. The settlement was first mentioned in 1186. In the 14th century it became part of the Bohemian (Czech) Kingdom. It was granted town rights in 1369. In 1397 a school was founded. The town suffered from fires in 1427, 1433, 1469, 1769 and 1834. In 1635 it passed to the Electorate of Saxony and from 1697 was also under the rule of the Kings of Poland. As a result of the Thirty Years' War, Protestants from the Czech Kingdom settled there.

In 1815 it fell to Prussia, and between 1871 and 1945 it was part of unified Germany. During World War II the German administration confiscated two historic church bells from the local church for armaments. After World War II, the town became again part of Poland under the terms of the post-war Potsdam Agreement.

The old church bells survived the war; however, they are now located in churches in Stuttgart and Ulm in Germany.

== Demographics ==
Historical population

Year	Pop.	±%
1890	2,605	—
1900	2,659	+2.1%
1910	2,769	+4.1%
1925	2,579	−6.9%

Year	Pop.	±%
1939	2,645	+2.6%
1950	1,545	−41.6%
1960	2,941	+90.4%
2010	4,301	+46.2%

== Sports ==
The local football team is Piast Zawidów. It competes in the lower leagues.
