= Bílý Potok (Liberec District) =

- Municipality
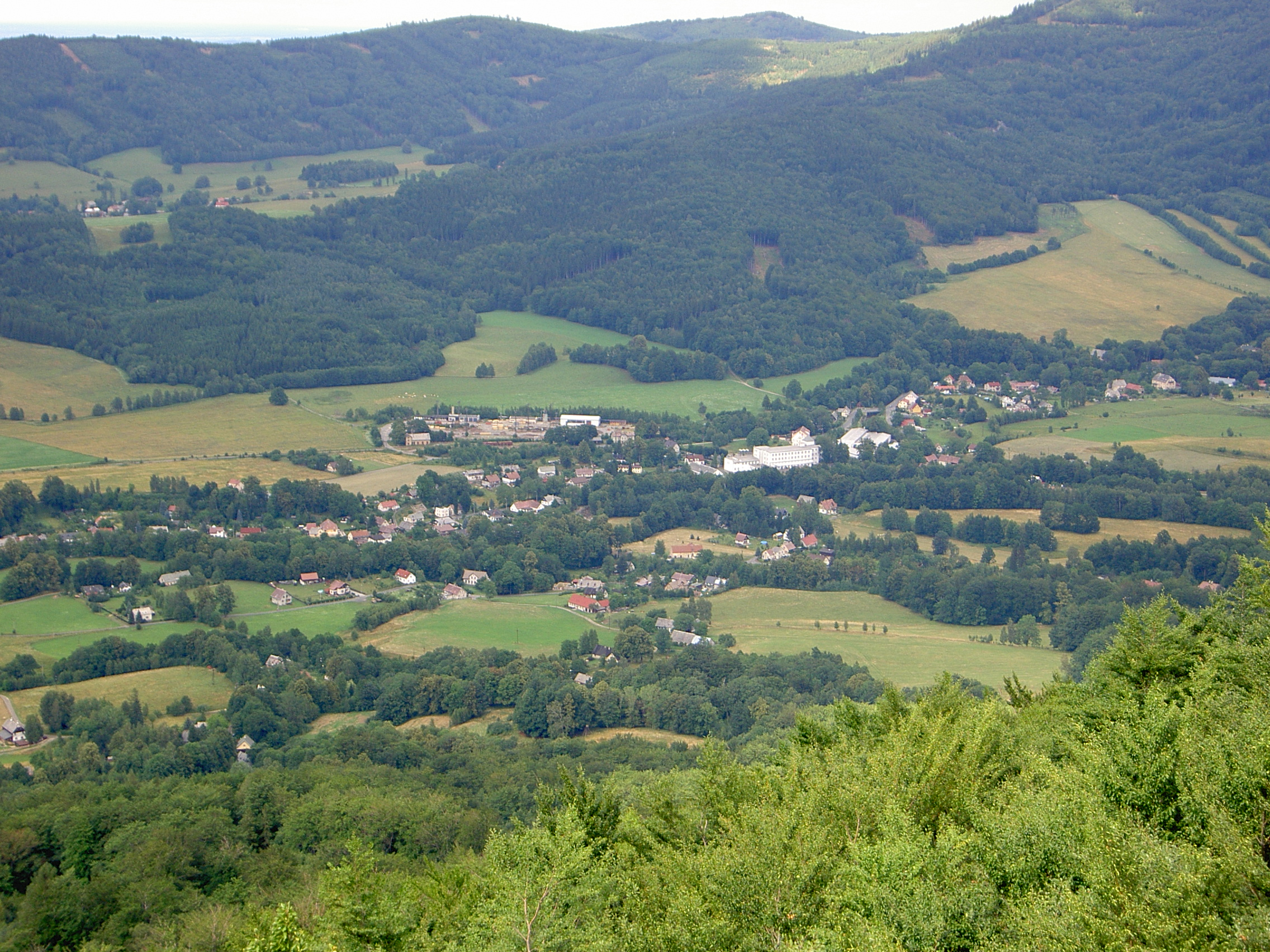
- Bílý Potok as seen from Ořešník

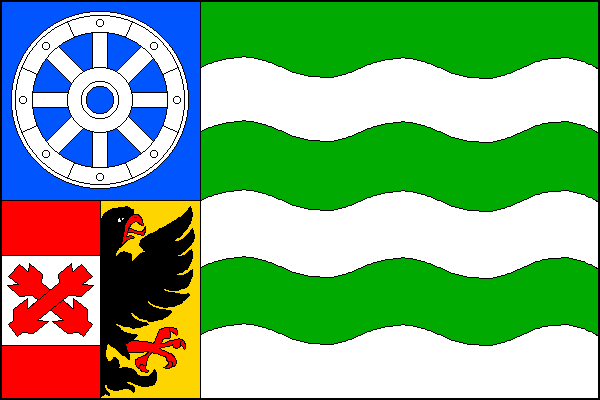
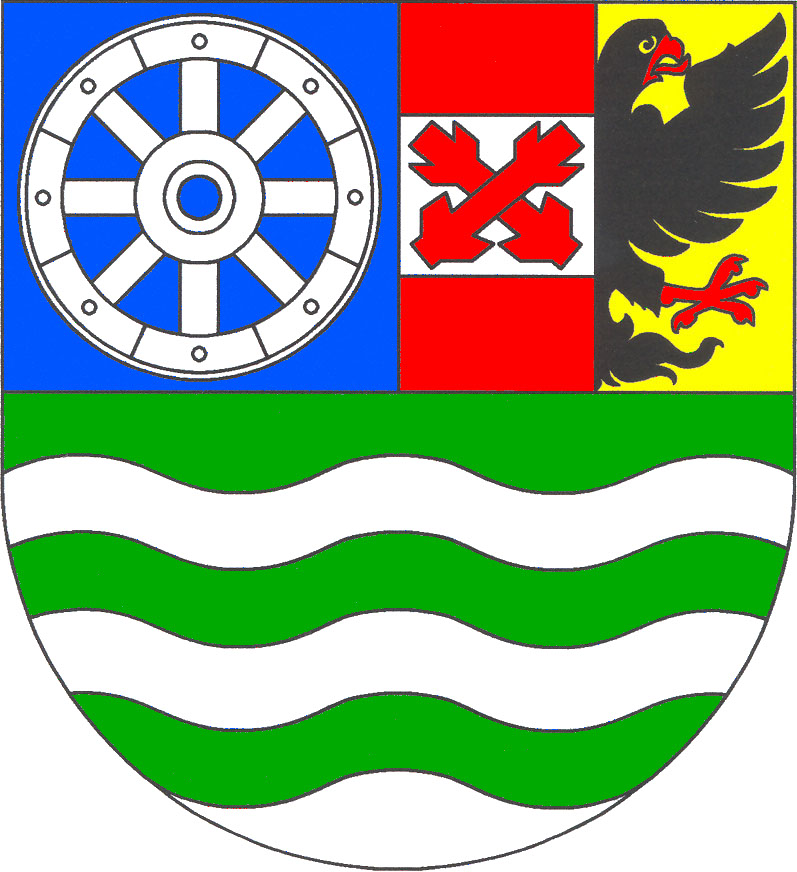
- Flag Coat of arms

- Location in the Czech Republic
- Coordinates: 50°52′26″N 15°13′20″E
- Country: Czech Republic
- Region: Liberec
- District: Liberec
- First mentioned: 1597

Area
  - Total: 18.21 km^{2} (7.03 sq mi)
- Elevation: 430 m (1,410 ft)

Population (2026-01-01)
  - Total: 693
  - Density: 38.1/km^{2} (98.6/sq mi)
- Time zone: UTC+1 (CET)
  - Summer (DST): UTC+2 (CEST)
- Postal code: 463 62
- Website: www.bily-potok.cz

Bílý Potok (German: Weißbach) is a municipality and village in Liberec District in the Liberec Region of the Czech Republic. It has about 700 inhabitants.

== Demographics ==
Historical population
Year	Pop.	±%
1869	1,928	—
1880	1,905	−1.2%
1890	1,907	+0.1%
1900	2,101	+10.2%
1910	2,012	−4.2%
1921	1,698	−15.6%
1930	1,545	−9.0%
1950	852	−44.9%
1961	945	+10.9%
1970	870	−7.9%
1980	749	−13.9%
1991	597	−20.3%
2001	623	+4.4%
2011	674	+8.2%
2021	694	+3.0%
Source: Censuses
