= Jizera Foothills =

Foothill region in Poland and the Czech Republic

- Frýdlant Hilly Land
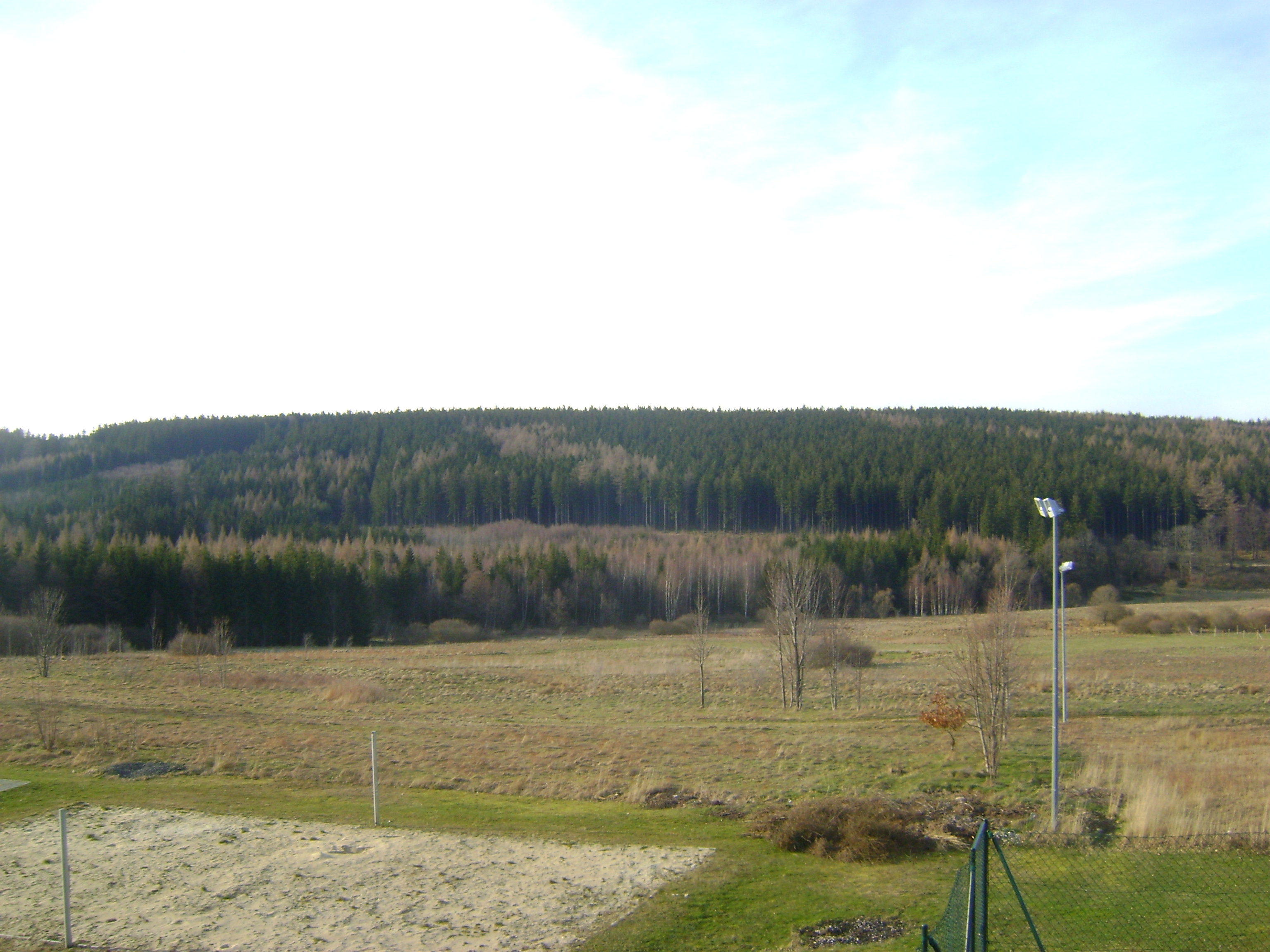
- Andělský vrch, the highest peak

Highest point
- Peak: Andělský vrch
- Elevation: 572 m (1,877 ft)

Dimensions
- Area: 1,650 km^{2} (640 mi^{2})

Geography
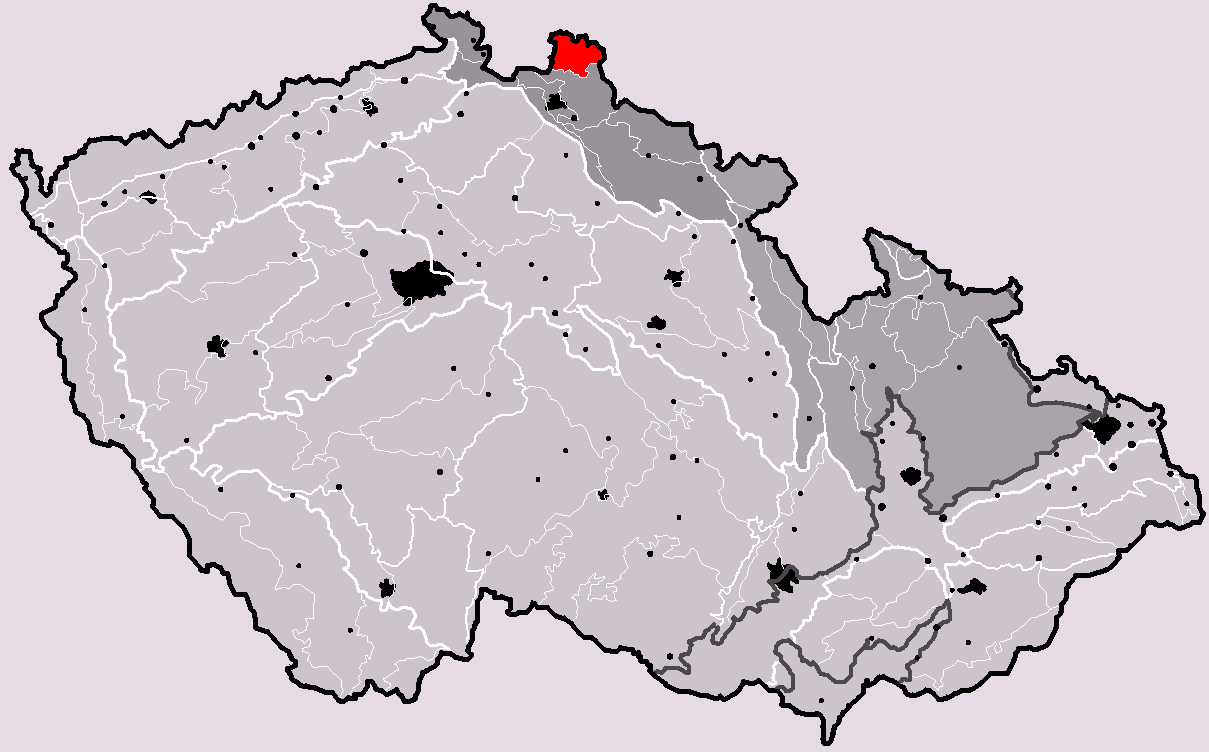
- Jizera Foothills in the geomorphological system of the Czech Republic
- Countries: Poland, Czech Republic
- Voivodeship/ Region: Lower Silesian/ Liberec
- Range coordinates: 51°7′N 15°17′E
- Parent range: Western Sudetes

The Jizera Foothills or Frýdlant Hilly Land (Polish: Pogórze Izerskie; Czech: Frýdlantská pahorkatina) are a foothill region in southwestern Poland and in the northern Czech Republic. It is part of the Western Sudetes macroregion. The highest summit is Andělský vrch (572 m).

== Geomorphology ==
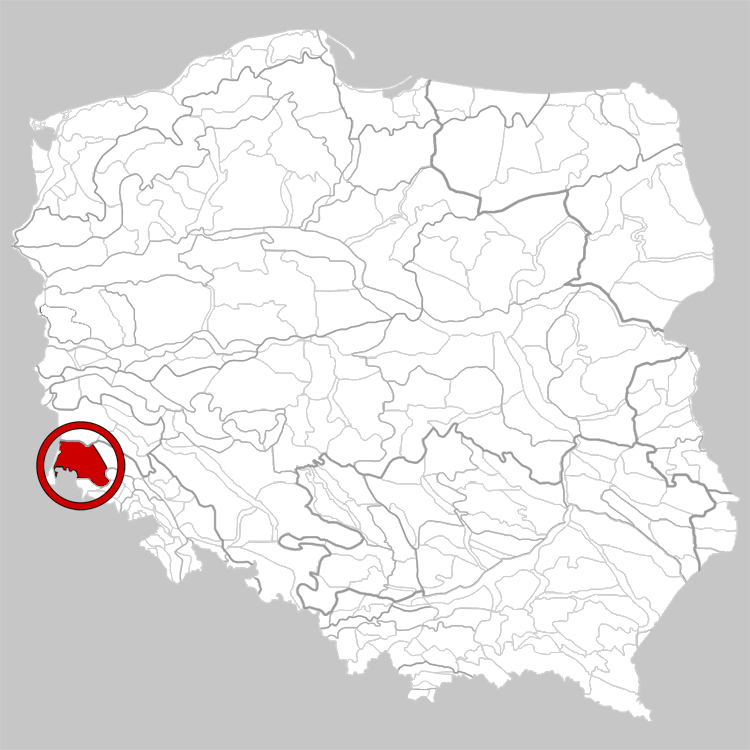
Jizera Foothills in the geomorphological system of Poland

The Jizera Foothills is a mesoregion of the Western Sudetes within the Bohemian Massif. The mesoregion is a foothill area of the Jizera Mountains and extends north of the mountain range. The relief is slightly undulating with low but prominent hills.

The highest peaks of the Jizera Foothills are:

- Andělský vrch, 572 m (1,877 ft)
- Hřebenáč, 567 m (1,860 ft)
- Sroczka, 542 m (1,778 ft)

== Geology ==
The bedrock is mainly composed of gneisses and biotite granites, supplemented by Neogene basalts and phonolites. There are also Quaternary sedimentary rocks here, which are a remnant of the Pleistocene glaciation.

== Geography ==
In the Czech Republic, the Jizera Foothills occupy most of the Frýdlant Hook (a salient of the Czech Republic) and cover 241 km^{2} (93 sq mi), with an average elevation of 359 m (1,178 ft).

The most important rivers in the territory are the Bóbr, which flows along its eastern border, and the Kwisa (a tributary of the Bóbr), which flows across the central part of the Jizera Foothills. The main river in the Czech part of the foothills is the Smědá.

The most populated settlements in the territory are Zgorzelec, Lubań, Lwówek Śląski, Frýdlant, Gryfów Śląski and Pieńsk. Except for Frýdlant, all of them are located in Poland.

== Nature ==
The valley of the Bóbr River in the eastern part of the Jizera Foothills is protected as the Bóbr Valley Landscape Park. The southernmost part of the Jizera Foothills extends into the protected landscape area of Jizerské hory.

The area along the Smědá River is protected as the Meandry Smědé Nature Reserve. The wider area is protected as a Special Area of Conservation of the same name.
