= Opolno Zdrój railway station =

Former railway station in Opolno-Zdrój, south-western Poland

Opolno Zdrój
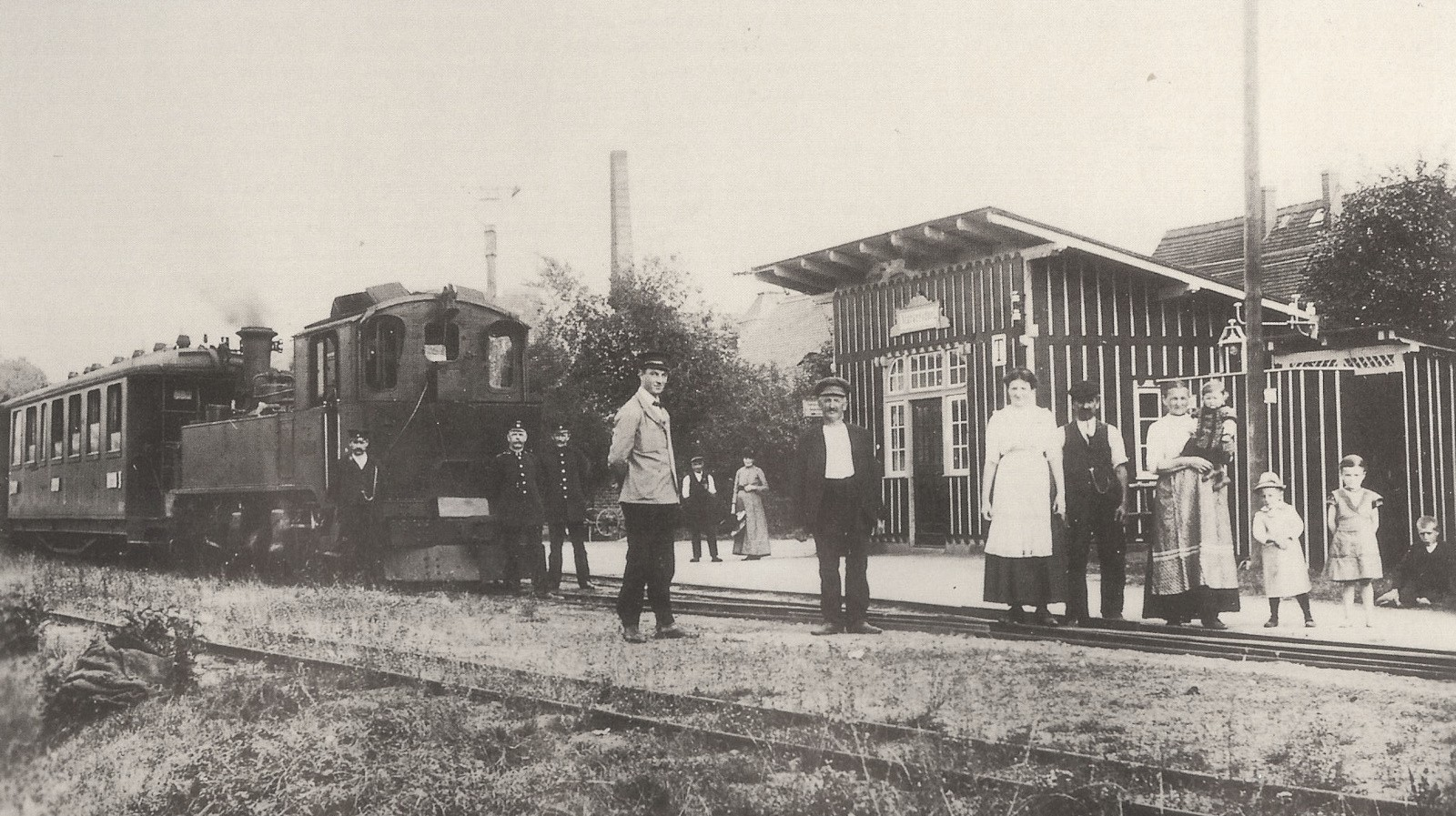
- Station building in early 1900s

General information
- Location: Opolno-Zdrój, Lower Silesian Voivodeship; Poland
- Coordinates: 50°53′45.0″N 14°55′40.1″E
- Owner: Polish State Railways
- Line: Zittau–Heřmanice railway (closed)
- Platforms: 1

History
- Opened: 11 November 1884
- Closed: 30 June 1961
Location
- Location within Poland Location within Lower Silesian Voivodeship

Opolno Zdrój (German: Wald-Bad Oppelsdorf) was a railway station on the Zittau–Heřmanice railway in the village of Opolno-Zdrój, Zgorzelec County, within the Lower Silesian Voivodeship in south-western Poland.

The station was located approximately 2.5 km (1.6 mi) away from Bogatynia. Prior to 1945, it served the Wald estate and the Bad Oppelsdorf spa town.

== History ==
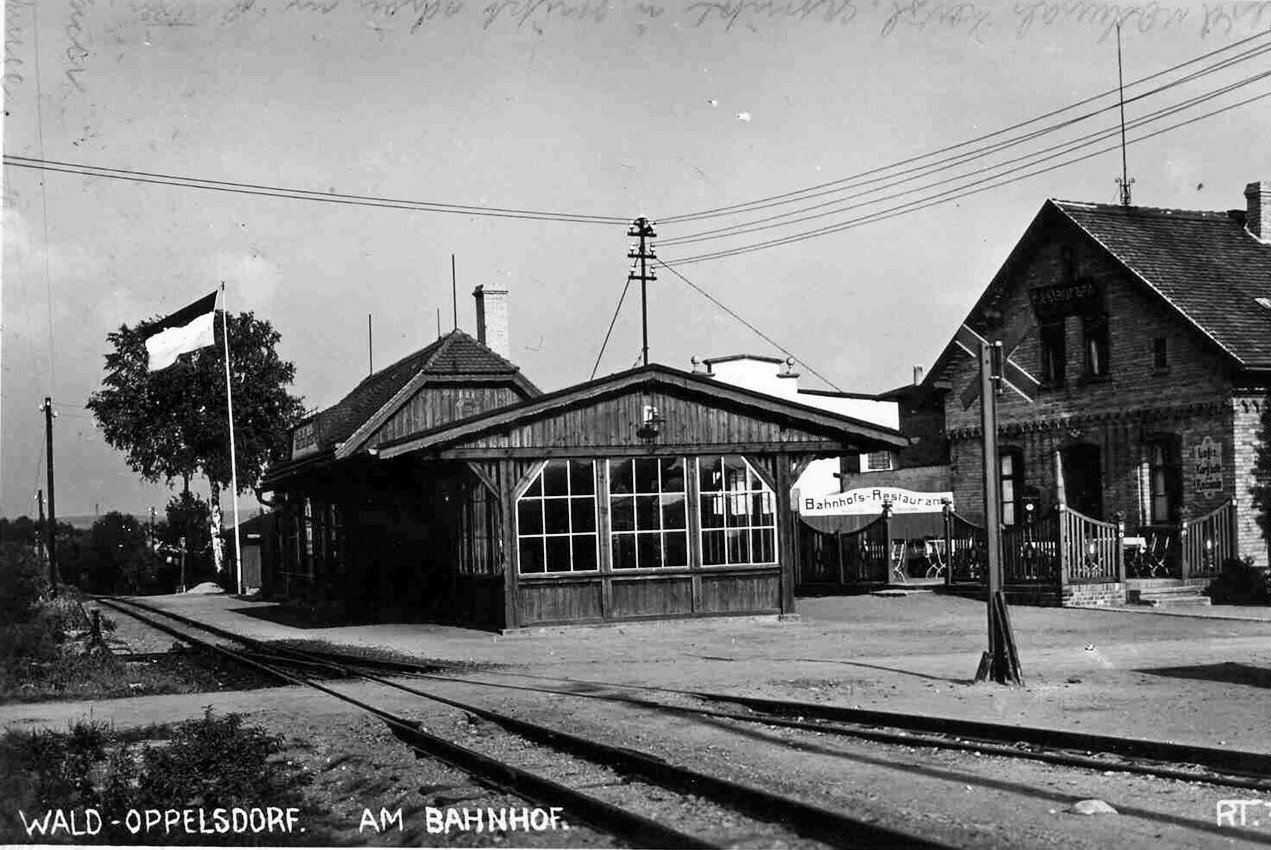
Station building c. 1935–1945

The station was opened by Royal Saxon State Railways on 11 November 1884 as Wald part of the Zittau–Heřmanice railway. The station was renamed to Wald-Oppelsdorf in 1893, and then Wald-Bad Oppelsdorf in 1928.

After World War II, the area came under Polish administration. As a result, the station was taken over by Polish State Railways. The station was renamed to Borzynia Zdrój, then to Opolówka Zdrój in 1946, and eventually to its modern name, Opolno Zdrój, in 1948.

Polish State Railways resumed passenger services on 20 May 1951 between Sieniawka and Markocice. The station closed on 30 June 1961.

By the 1980s, any remains of the station, including the station building were demolished due to the expansion of the Turów Coal Mine.

== Former services ==
Preceding station	Disused railways	Following station
Bogatynia Wąskotorowa towards Markocice	Polish State Railways; Zittau–Heřmanice	Rybarzowice towards Sieniawka
