= Bogatynia Wąskotorowa railway station =

Former railway station in Bogatynia, south-western Poland

Bogatynia Wąskotorowa
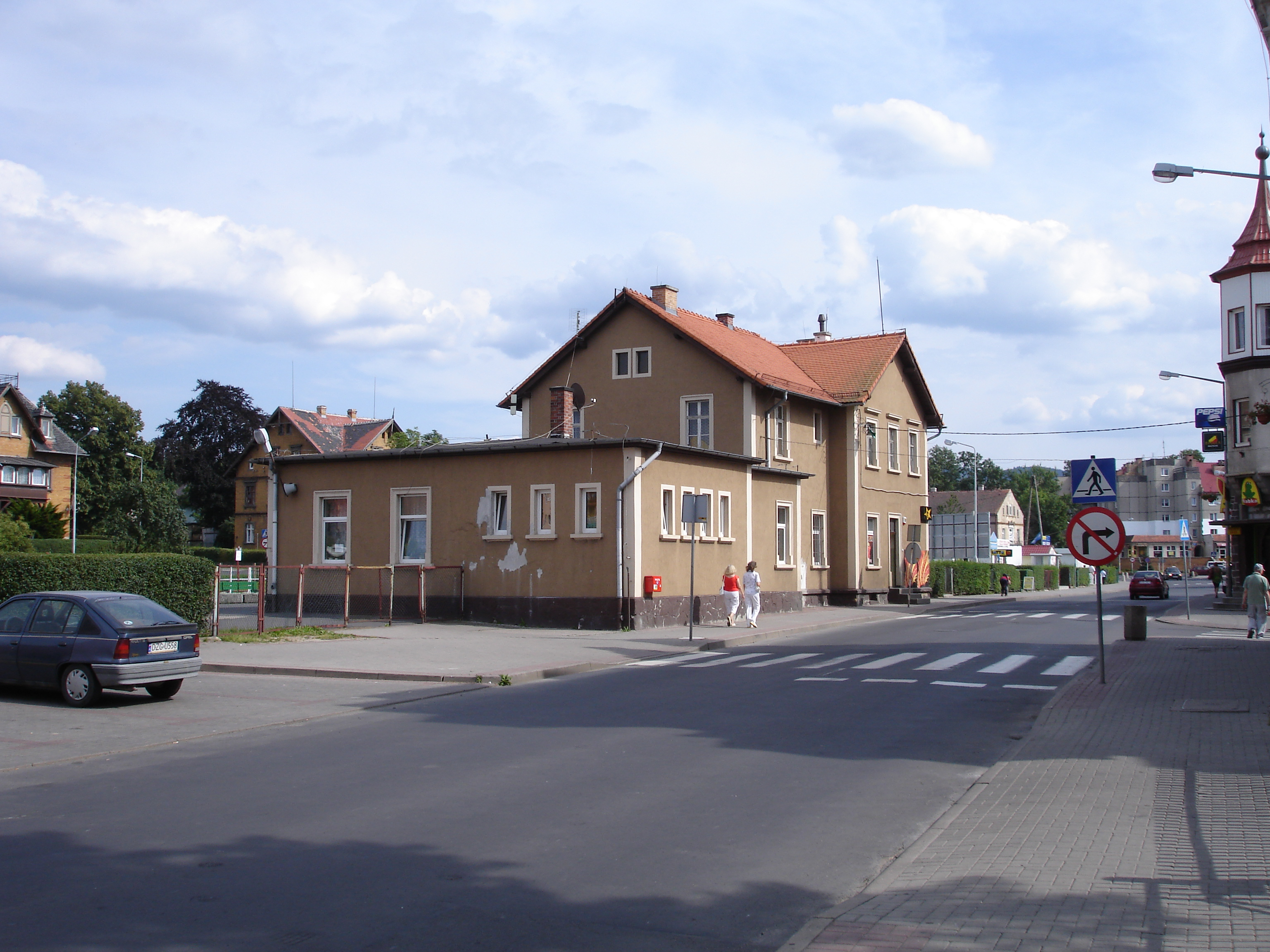
- Former station building

General information
- Location: Bogatynia, Lower Silesian Voivodeship; Poland
- Coordinates: 50°54′26.3″N 14°57′09.7″E
- Owner: Polish State Railways
- Lines: Zittau–Heřmanice railway (closed); Bogatynia narrow-gauge railway (closed)
- Platforms: 2

History
- Opened: 11 November 1884
- Closed: 30 June 1961
Location
- Location within Poland Location within Lower Silesian Voivodeship

Bogatynia Wąskotorowa lit. 'Bogatynia narrow-gauge' (German: Reichenau) was a railway station in the town of Bogatynia, Zgorzelec County, within the Lower Silesian Voivodeship in south-western Poland.

The former station building now serves as Bogatynia bus station, after the railway station closed on 30 June 1961.

== History ==
=== Pre World War II ===
The station was opened by Royal Saxon State Railways on 11 November 1884 as Reichenau part of the Zittau–Heřmanice railway. In 1917, the station was renamed to Reichenau (Sa) (Sa for Saxony), and was renamed once again to Reichenau (Sachs) in 1933.

The locomotives of the Zittau–Heřmanice railway were serviced outside at the station. For boiler flushing, the locomotives were temporarily moved to Węgliniec. In 1913, a locomotive derailed and crashed at the station.

=== Post World War ===
After World War II, the area came under Polish administration. As a result, the station was taken over by Polish State Railways, and was renamed to Rychnów, and later to its modern name, Bogatynia Wąskotorowa, in the following year.

Polish State Railways resumed passenger services on the Zittau–Heřmanice railway on 20 May 1951, with trains running between Sieniawka and Markocice, as they could not cross the border into East Germany or Czechoslovakia. On the same day, Polish State Railways opened the Bogatynia narrow-gauge railway, connecting the station with Turoszów Wąskotorowy.

With the opening of Bogatynia railway station in on 29 May 1960, the Bogatynia narrow-gauge railway closed in the same year, and the Zittau–Heřmanice railway the following year on 30 June 1961.

== Former services ==
Preceding station	Disused railways	Following station
Bogatynia Wschodnia towards Markocice	Polish State Railways; Zittau–Heřmanice	Opolno Zdrój towards Sieniawka
Terminus	Polish State Railways; Bogatynia narrow-gauge	Turoszów Kopalnia Wąskotorowy towards Turoszów Wąskotorowy
