= Black Triangle (region) =

Border region between Germany, Poland, and Czechia

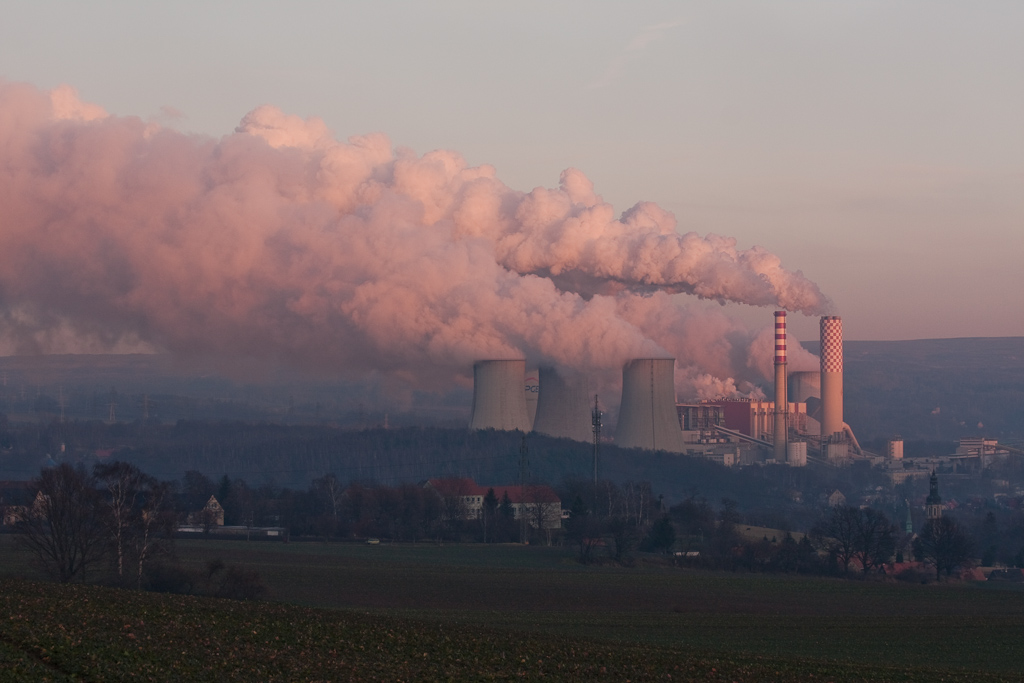
Turów Power Station, a thermal power station in Bogatynia, Poland

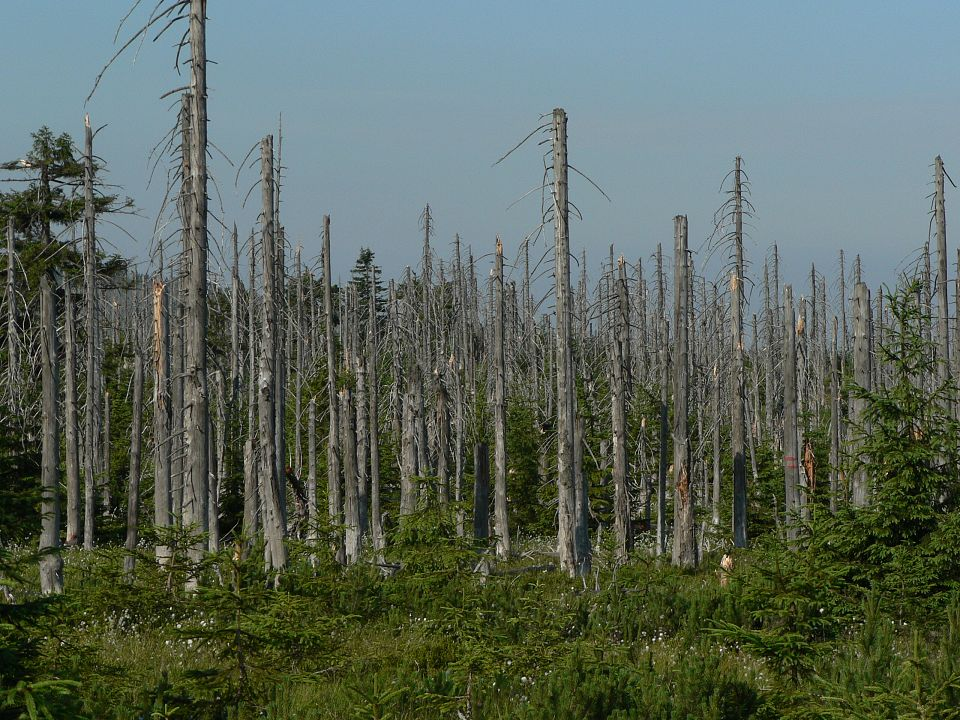
Effects of acid rain in the Jizera Mountains in 2006

The Black Triangle (Czech: Černý trojúhelník, German: Schwarzes Dreieck, Polish: Czarny trójkąt, Lower Sorbian: Carny tsirozk, Upper Sorbian: Čorny trirózk) is the border region between Germany, Poland and the Czech Republic, long characterized by extremely high levels of pollution. The term was coined in the 1980s. For decades, industrially produced air pollutants (chiefly sulfur dioxide), water pollution, acid rain and other effects took an enormous toll on the health of local residents and the surrounding environment.

After the Revolutions of 1989 in Eastern Europe, the three nations acted to cut emissions. This has resulted in significant environmental improvement.

== Geography ==
In shape the "triangle" is more similar to a crescent, an industrial corridor roughly 60 kilometers wide, lying on either side of the northern Czech border extending from the German town of Bad Brambach on the west to the Polish town of Bystrzyca Kłodzka at the eastern end. The approximate center is the national tripoint at Zittau. Politically the "triangle" consists of:

- Germany's two local administrative regions surrounding Dresden and Chemnitz, amounting to about 14,000 square kilometers, with a population of 3.36 million people (as of 2002)
- the southwest portion of Poland's Lower Silesian Voivodeship, amounting to 8,500 square kilometers, with a population of 1.3 million
- four regions of the Czech Republic (Hradec Králové, Karlovy Vary, Liberec and Ústí nad Labem), amounting to 12,000 square kilometers and a population of 1.59 million

The Polish portion includes the southernmost "salient" of the Gmina Bogatynia, where the vast Turów Coal Mine has extracted lignite resources since 1904.

The entire area is framed by mountain ranges which form a local climate, trapping air and intensifying the effects of the air pollution.

== Exploitation ==
The general area is historically known for its natural resources and mineral deposits, and had traditional glass, ceramics, and textiles industries. The Ore Mountains between Saxony and Bohemia have been the scene of multiple Berggeschrei ("silver rushes") over centuries, the first in 1168. From that discovery at Christiansdorf (part of the Freiberg Mining Field), mining was carried out uninterruptedly in the Ore Mountains until 1990. Amongst the raw materials mined over the course of centuries were ores of the metals silver, tin, zinc, cobalt, nickel, copper and lead; anthracite and uranium were also extracted into the 20th century and were engines for the economic development of Saxony.

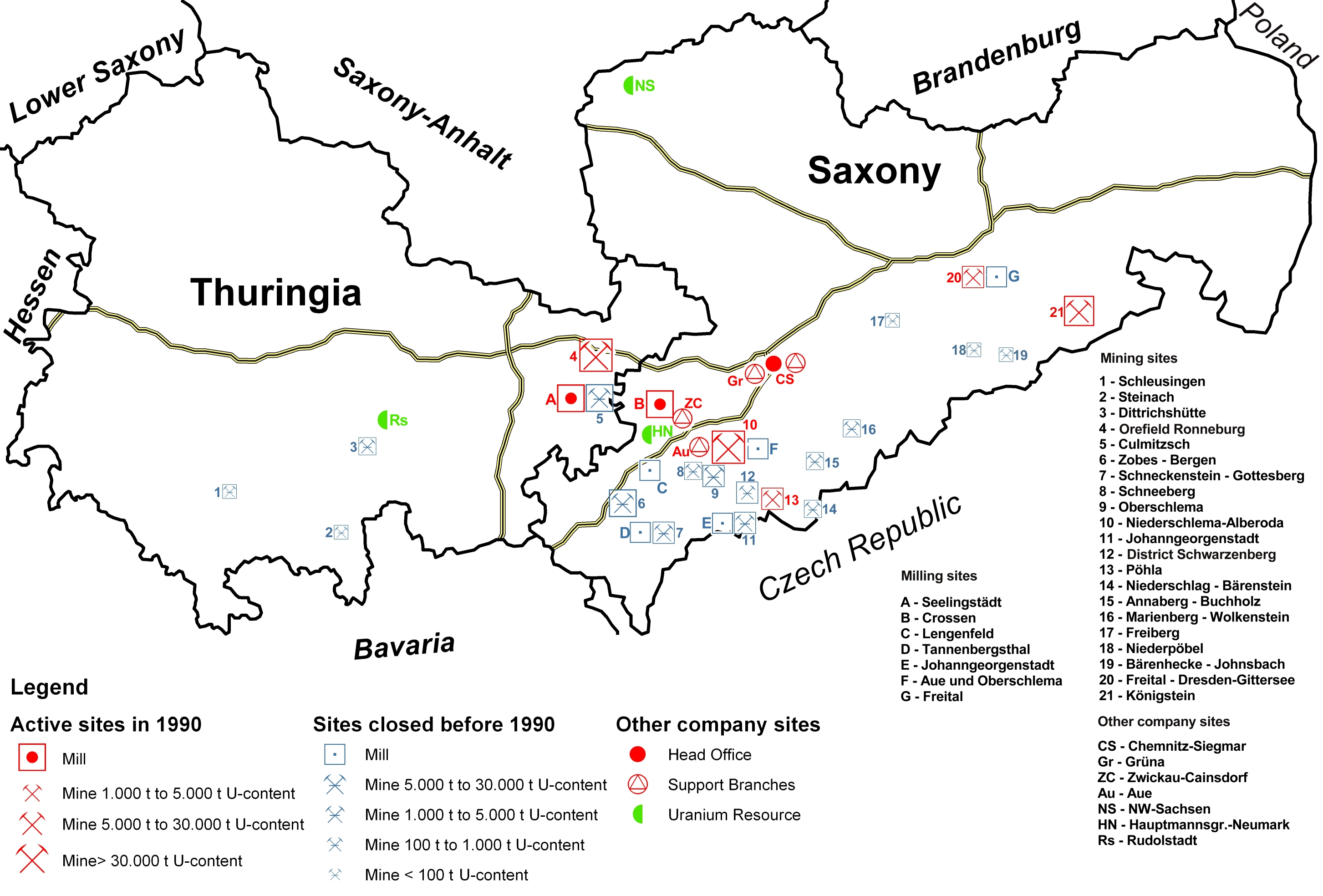
SDAG Wismut uranium mining operations in Saxony and Thuringia

The pace of mineral exploitation rose dramatically in the 20th century. In late 1942, under wartime German control, the Czech town of Most began output of Ersatz fuel synthesized from brown coal at the "Sudetenländische Treibstoffwerke AG (STW) Maltheuren plant", operating with forced labor. The town was repeatedly bombed during the Oil Campaign of World War II.

After the war, with Soviet domination of the area, Moscow ordered the industrial development of the North Bohemian Basin on a grand scale. The installation of chemical plants, steel factories and refineries required vast amounts of energy; the energy came from burning dirty and inexpensive lignite from local strip mines. As one example of the impact, in 1964 the Mostecká uhelná Company began the demolition of the entire medieval Old Town of Most to make room for the expanding lignite mines. The inhabitants were given two options: move into the new housing projects, or leave town.

Similar developments took place throughout the Black Triangle. Much of the energy produced was exported to western Europe in exchange for hard currency. The Czech town of Jáchymov was the site of an "infamous" uranium mine, while the largest concentration of uranium mines in all of Europe stood nearby in East Germany. They were operated as a military secret and "in the prevailing spirit of Soviet gigantism" by SDAG Wismut to feed the Soviet atomic bomb project.

The net result of industrial activity in the Triangle were huge quantities of particulate emissions, heavy metals, sulfur dioxides and nitrogen oxides which largely destroyed adjacent forests of the Jizera Mountains with acid rain, and measurable impact on health and life expectancy.

== Recovery ==
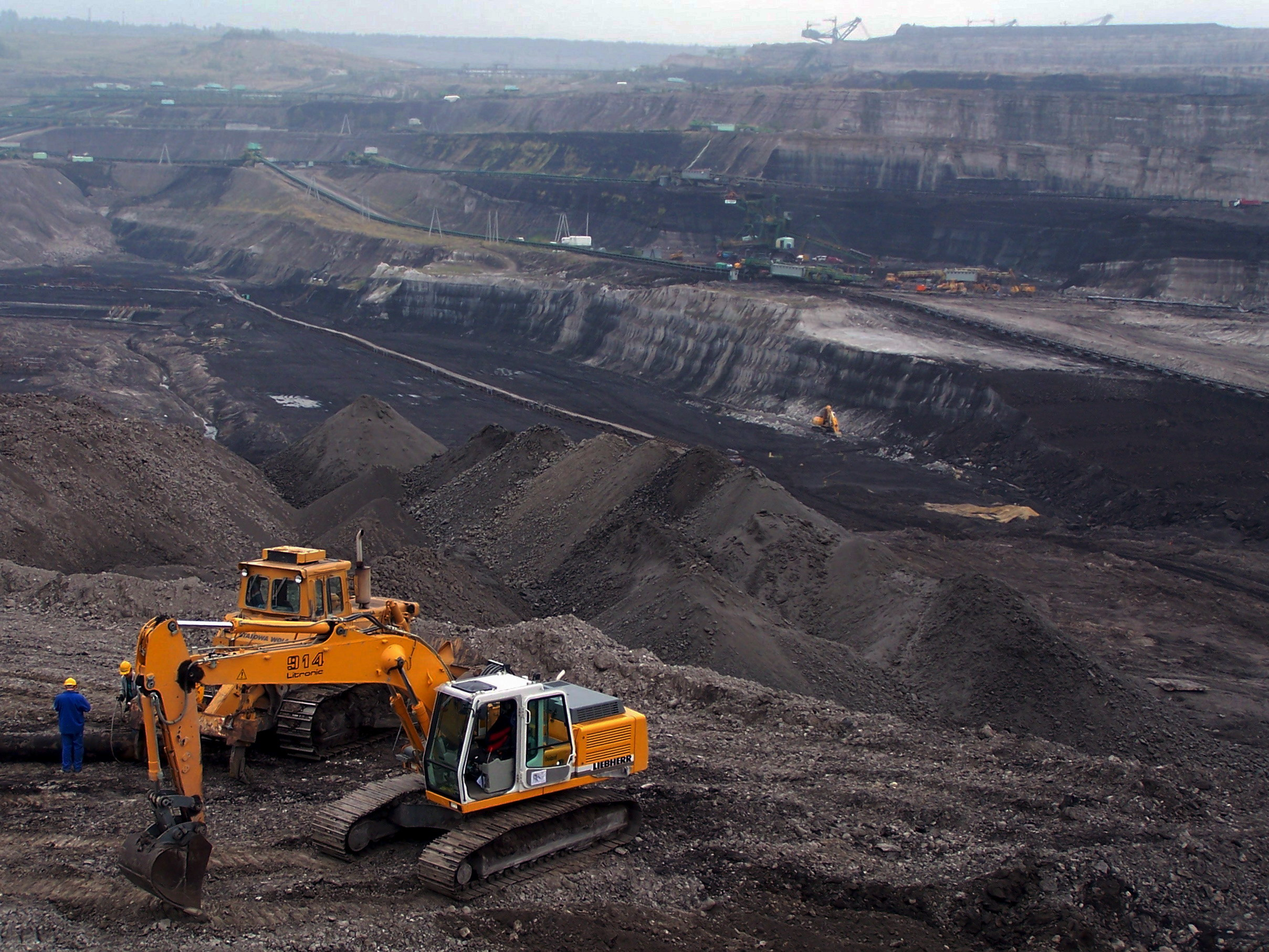
Turów Coal Mine, southern Poland

After the Revolutions of 1989 in Eastern Europe, in June 1991 the three nations signed a joint declaration of cooperation to address the Black Triangle's environmental issues. They later coordinated with the European Commission, which has funded small projects and measurement initiative through its Phare program. This has resulted in significant improvement in human health, the health of forests, and levels of pollutants.

In 1991 after German reunification SDAG Wismut was transformed into the Wismut GmbH company, owned by the Federal Republic of Germany, which is now responsible for the restoration and environmental cleanup of the former mining and milling areas.

The region remains an important industrial center with serious environmental challenges. The Turów Coal Mine, still operated by the Polska Grupa Energetyczna, produces about 30 million tons of lignite annually. The bowl-shaped open-pit mine is several kilometers in diameter, about 200 meters deep, and has completely transformed the original geographic character of the Turoszowska Basin. The mine and its extensive dumping grounds now cover more than half the basin.

A documentary film about the Black Triangle won a Golden Gate Award at the 1991 San Francisco International Film Festival. Czech photographer Josef Koudelka also produced a book about the region, Černý trojúhelník - Podkrušnohoří (The Black Triangle: The Foothills of the Ore Mountain) in 1994.
