= Rybarzowice railway station =

Former railway station in Rybarzowice, south-western Poland

Rybarzowice

General information
- Location: Rybarzowice, Lower Silesian Voivodeship; Poland
- Coordinates: 50°53′51.0″N 14°54′13.0″E
- Owner: Polish State Railways
- Line: Zittau–Heřmanice railway (closed)
- Platforms: 1

History
- Opened: 11 November 1884
- Closed: 30 June 1961
- Former names: Reibersdorf (1884–1945); Rybarzewice (1945–1948)
Location
- Location within Poland Location within Lower Silesian Voivodeship

Rybarzowice (German: Reibersdorf) was a railway station on the Zittau–Heřmanice railway in the former village of Rybarzowice, Zgorzelec County, within the Lower Silesian Voivodeship in south-western Poland.

== History ==
The station was opened by Royal Saxon State Railways on 11 November 1884 as Reibersdorf part of the Zittau–Heřmanice railway.

After World War II, the area came under Polish administration. As a result, the station was taken over by Polish State Railways, and was renamed to Rybarzewice, and later to its modern name, Rybarzowice, in 1948.

Polish State Railways resumed passenger services on 20 May 1951 between Sieniawka and Markocice. The station closed on 30 June 1961.

== Former services ==
Preceding station	Disused railways	Following station
Opolno Zdrój towards Markocice	Polish State Railways; Zittau–Heřmanice	Biedrzychowice Górne towards Sieniawka
