= Bogatynia Wschodnia railway station =

Former railway station in Bogatynia, south-western Poland

Bogatynia Wschodnia

General information
- Location: Markocice, Bogatynia, Lower Silesian Voivodeship; Poland
- Coordinates: 50°53′53.5″N 14°58′18.0″E
- Owner: Polish State Railways
- Line: Zittau–Heřmanice railway (closed)
- Platforms: 1

History
- Opened: 11 November 1884
- Closed: 30 June 1961
- Former names: Markersdorf (1884–1902); Markersdorf bei Reichenau (1902–1917); Markersdorf bei Reichenau (Sachsen) (1917–1945); Myśleszów (1945–1947)
Location
- Location within Poland Location within Lower Silesian Voivodeship

Bogatynia Wschodnia (German: Markersdorf bei Reichenau) was a railway station on the Zittau–Heřmanice railway in the Markocice district of Bogatynia, Zgorzelec County, within the Lower Silesian Voivodeship in south-western Poland.

== History ==
The station was opened by Royal Saxon State Railways on 11 November 1884 as Markersdorf part of the Zittau–Heřmanice railway. The station was renamed to Markersdorf bei Reichenau in 1902, and then to Markersdorf bei Reichenau (Sachsen) for designation in 1917.

After World War II, the area came under Polish administration. As a result, the station was taken over by Polish State Railways, and was renamed to Myśleszów, and later to its modern name, Bogatynia Wschodnia, in 1947.

Polish State Railways resumed passenger services on 20 May 1951 between Sieniawka and Markocice. The station closed on 30 June 1961.

== Former services ==
Preceding station	Disused railways	Following station
Markocice; Terminus	Polish State Railways; Zittau–Heřmanice	Bogatynia Wąskotorowa towards Sieniawka
