= Kleinschönau =

Kleinschönau may refer to

- Community of Zwettl municipality, Zwettl District, Lower Austria, Austria
- Community of Vitis municipality, Waidhofen an der Thaya District, Lower Austria, Austria
- German name of Sieniawka, Zgorzelec County, Poland

- Sieniawka railway station, known as Kleinschönau railway station from 1884 to 1945
