= Turoszów Kopalnia Wąskotorowy railway station =

Former railway station in Turoszów, south-western Poland

Turoszów Kopalnia Wąskotorowy

General information
- Location: Turoszów, Bogatynia, Lower Silesian Voivodeship; Poland
- Coordinates: 50°55′45.8″N 14°55′23.2″E
- Owner: Polish State Railways
- Line: Bogatynia narrow-gauge railway
- Platforms: 1

History
- Opened: 20 May 1951
- Closed: August 1960
Location
- Location within Poland Location within Lower Silesian Voivodeship

Turoszów Kopalnia Wąskotorowy lit. 'Turów Coal Mine Narrow-gauge' was a railway station on the Bogatynia narrow-gauge railway serving the Turów Coal Mine in the Turoszów district of Bogatynia, Zgorzelec County, within the Lower Silesian Voivodeship in south-western Poland.

== History ==
The station opened on 20 May 1951 part of the Bogatynia narrow-gauge railway (which was part of the Bogatynia Commuter Railway) to serve as a freight loading bay for the Turów Coal Mine as well as a stop for local workers of the mine. In 1959, the station was downgraded to a railway stop (halt), due to the demolition of the station building. With the opening of the station's replacement, Turoszów Kopalnia railway station in 1960, the station closed in August of the same year. It was demolished by 1966.

== Former services ==
| Preceding station | Disused railways | Following station |
|---|---|---|
| Bogatynia Wąskotorowa; Terminus | Polish State Railways; Bogatynia narrow-gauge | Turoszów Wąskotorowy; Terminus |
