= Rybarzowice =

Rybarzowice may refer to:

- Rybarzowice, Lower Silesian Voivodeship in Gmina Bogatynia, Zgorzelec County in Lower Silesian Voivodeship (south-west Poland)
- Rybarzowice, Silesian Voivodeship (south Poland)
