= Biedrzychowice Górne railway station =

Former railway station in Biedrzychowice Górne, south-western Poland

Biedrzychowice Górne

General information
- Location: Biedrzychowice Górne, Lower Silesian Voivodeship; Poland
- Coordinates: 50°54′10.1″N 14°52′41.2″E
- Owner: Polish State Railways
- Line: Zittau–Heřmanice railway (closed)
- Platforms: 1

History
- Opened: 11 November 1884
- Closed: 30 June 1961
- Former names: Zittel (1884–1931); Friedersdorf (bei Zittau) (1931–1945)
Location
- Location within Poland Location within Lower Silesian Voivodeship

Biedrzychowice Górne (German: Friedersdorf) was a railway station on the Zittau–Heřmanice railway in the former village of Biedrzychowice Górne, Zgorzelec County, within the Lower Silesian Voivodeship in south-western Poland.

== History ==
The station was opened by Royal Saxon State Railways on 11 November 1884 as Zittel part of the Zittau–Heřmanice railway. The station was renamed to Friedersdorf (bei Zittau) for designation in 1931.

After World War II, the area came under Polish administration. As a result, the station was taken over by Polish State Railways, and was renamed to Biedrzychowice Górne.

Polish State Railways resumed passenger services on 20 May 1951 between Sieniawka and Markocice. The station closed on 30 June 1961.

== Former services ==
| Preceding station | Disused railways | Following station |
|---|---|---|
| Rybarzowice towards Markocice | Polish State Railways; Zittau–Heřmanice | Sieniawka; Terminus |
