= Markocice, Bogatynia =

District of Bogatynia, Poland

Markocice
- District of Bogatynia
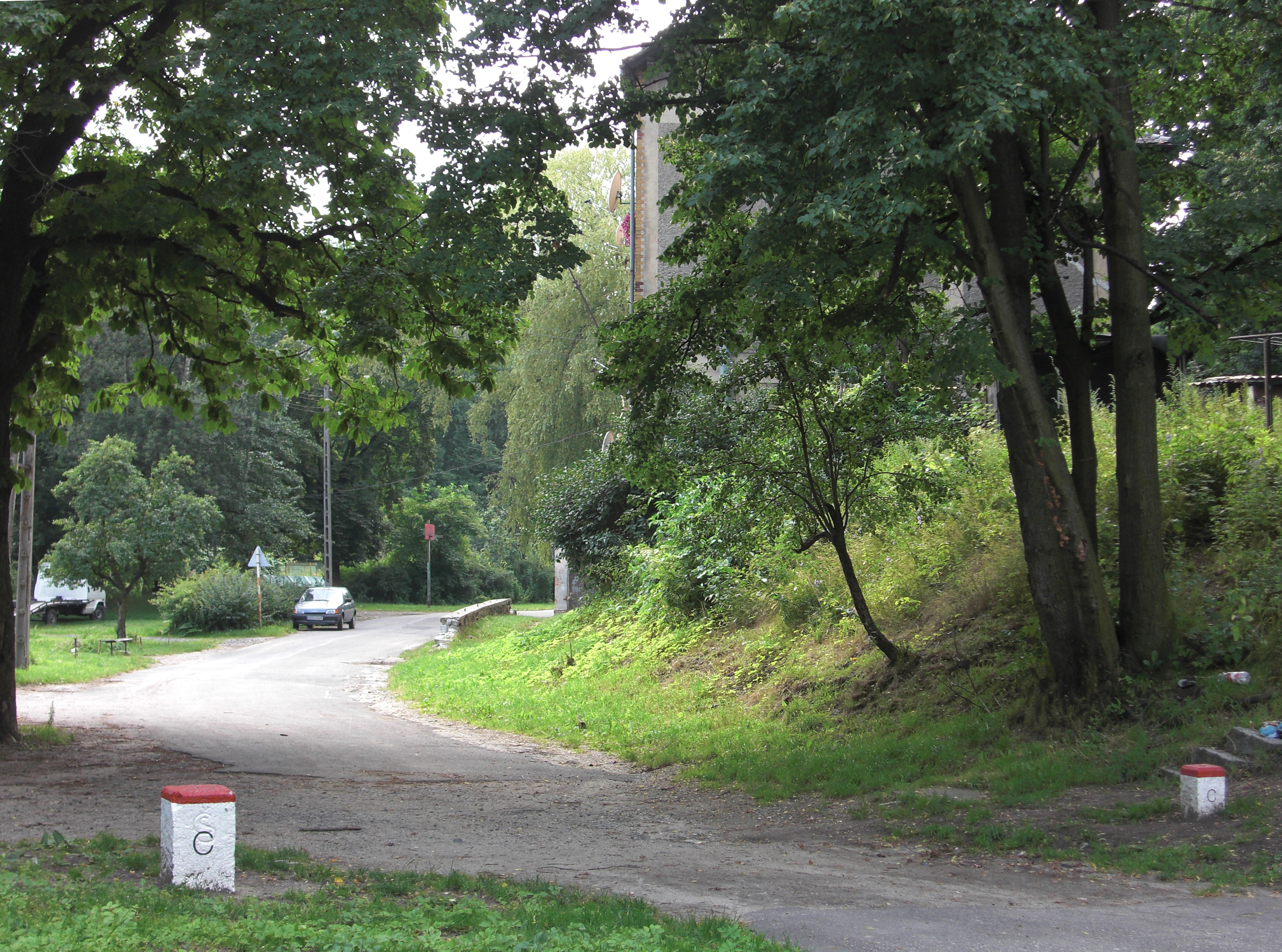
- Border crossing

- Location within Poland Location within Lower Silesian Voivodeship
- Coordinates: 50°53′43.29″N 14°58′54.34″E
- Country: Poland
- Voivodeship: Lower Silesian
- County: Zgorzelec
- Town: Bogatynia
- First mentioned: 1445
- Within town limits: 1954
- Elevation: 250–310 m (820–1,020 ft)
- Time zone: UTC+1 (CET)
  - Summer (DST): UTC+2 (CEST)
- Area code: +48 75
- Vehicle registration: DZG

Markocice (German: Markersdorf) is a district in the town of Bogatynia, Zgorzelec County, in the Lower Silesian Voivodeship in western Poland.

== Geography ==
Markocice is a former Waldhufendorf, approximately 1.5 km (0.93 mi) long, and currently the south-eastern part of Bogatynia, situated in the Jizera Foothills, in the Turoszów Valley, at an altitude of approximately 250–310 m (820–1,020 ft) above sea level. It is home to the Heřmanice-Markocice border crossing.

== History ==
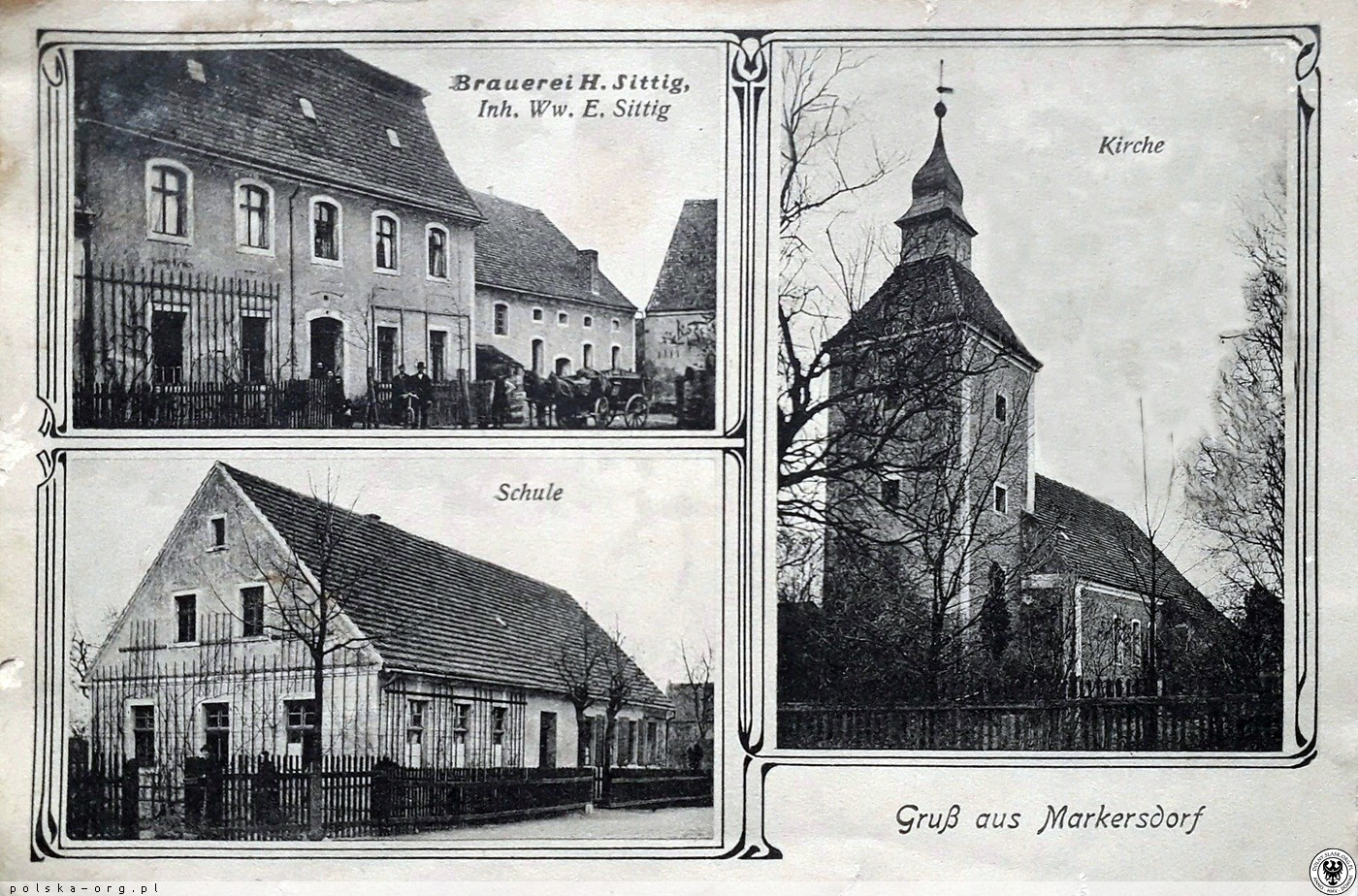
Village in 1917

Markocice was first mentioned in 1396 as Marquardtsdorf, part of the Zittau district. It was owned by the Berka von Dubá family of Rohnau. After the destruction of the Ronow Castle, the village was taken over by the Bieberstein family to be part of their Seidenberg estate from 1454.

On 11 November 1884, Markersdorf railway station opened with the opening of the Zittau–Heřmanice railway. This line was extended to Heřmanice via Markersdorf Haltepunkt in 1900. Textile factories also opened in the lower part of the village. The population rose from 986 (1871) to 1,132 in 1910 and then declined again, reaching 1,032 in 1943.

After World War II, the area came under Polish administration. As a result, the village was renamed to Markocice. The village became a district of Bogatynia on 2 October 1954. The Zittau–Heřmanice railway closed on 30 June 1961.
