= Turoszów Wąskotorowy railway station =

Former railway station in Turoszów, south-western Poland

Turoszów Wąskotorowy

General information
- Location: Turoszów, Bogatynia, Lower Silesian Voivodeship; Poland
- Coordinates: 50°56′31.9″N 14°54′38.2″E
- Owner: Polish State Railways
- Line: Bogatynia narrow-gauge railway
- Platforms: 1

History
- Opened: 20 May 1951
- Closed: 1960
Location
- Location within Poland Location within Lower Silesian Voivodeship

Turoszów Wąskotorowy was a railway station on the Bogatynia narrow-gauge railway in the Turoszów of Bogatynia, Zgorzelec County, within the Lower Silesian Voivodeship in south-western Poland.

== History ==
The station opened on 20 May 1951 as the terminus of the Bogatynia narrow-gauge railway. The station closed in 1960, after it was replaced by Turoszów railway station which opened in 1949.

== Former services ==
Preceding station	Disused railways	Following station
Turoszów Kopalnia Wąskotorowy towards Bogatynia Wąskotorowa	Polish State Railways; Bogatynia narrow-gauge	Terminus
