= Rybarzowice, Lower Silesian Voivodeship =

Rybarzowice
- Former village
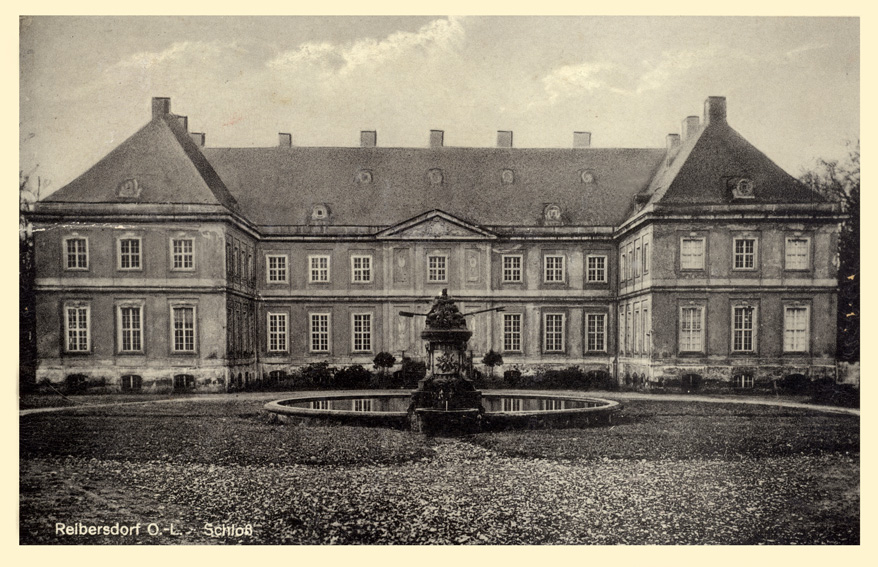
- Former palace in the village
- Interactive map of Rybarzowice
- Location within Poland
- Coordinates: 50°54′10″N 14°54′00″E
- Country: Poland
- Voivodeship: Lower Silesian
- County: Zgorzelec
- Gmina: Bogatynia
- Time zone: UTC+1 (CET)
  - Summer (DST): UTC+2 (CEST)

Rybarzowice [rɨbaʐɔˈvit͡sɛ] (German: Reibersdorf; Upper Sorbian: Rejberska) is a former village in the administrative district of Gmina Bogatynia, within Zgorzelec County, Lower Silesian Voivodeship, in south-western Poland, close to the Czech and German borders. The village ceased to exist after 2000, when the last house was demolished. It was situated approximately 5 km (3 mi) south-west of Bogatynia, 29 km (18 mi) south of Zgorzelec, and 152 km (94 mi) west of the regional capital Wrocław.

== History ==
At various times, it was under the rule of Bohemian, Hungarian, Polish and Saxon monarchs. In 1630 it became part of a newly formed state country centered in nearby Zawidów, and in 1815 it became its capital.

In June 1945 the 1,300 inhabitants were expelled westwards beyond the river Neisse and Poland seized the area. After 1945, the manor was turned into a state-owned farm. After 1956, the palace was displaced and left as a vacancy as part of the "war with the kulaks", gradually devastating according to top-down guidelines. Most of the inhabitants of Rybarzowice worked at the nearby lignite mine and Turów Power Station. The youth found entertainment in the Village Culture Centre, where there was a common room with a spacious hall and stage. The Volunteer Fire Brigade, the Village Housewives' Circle and many other organizations of the active Rybnik community were active.

Rybarzowice and several other nearby towns fell victim to the lignite mining technology implemented by the Turów coal mine. In 1966, Rybarzowice was inhabited by about 1,500 inhabitants, and then a gradual displacement began, caused by the ongoing expansion of the mine. On July 25, 2000, the last house was demolished. The centuries-old material, cultural and all other achievements of numerous generations of the inhabitants of Reibersdorf and then of Rybarzowice ceased to exist forever. The last buildings in the village were demolished in 2000, as a result of the expansion of lignite mining operations in the area.
