= Opolno-Zdrój =

- Village
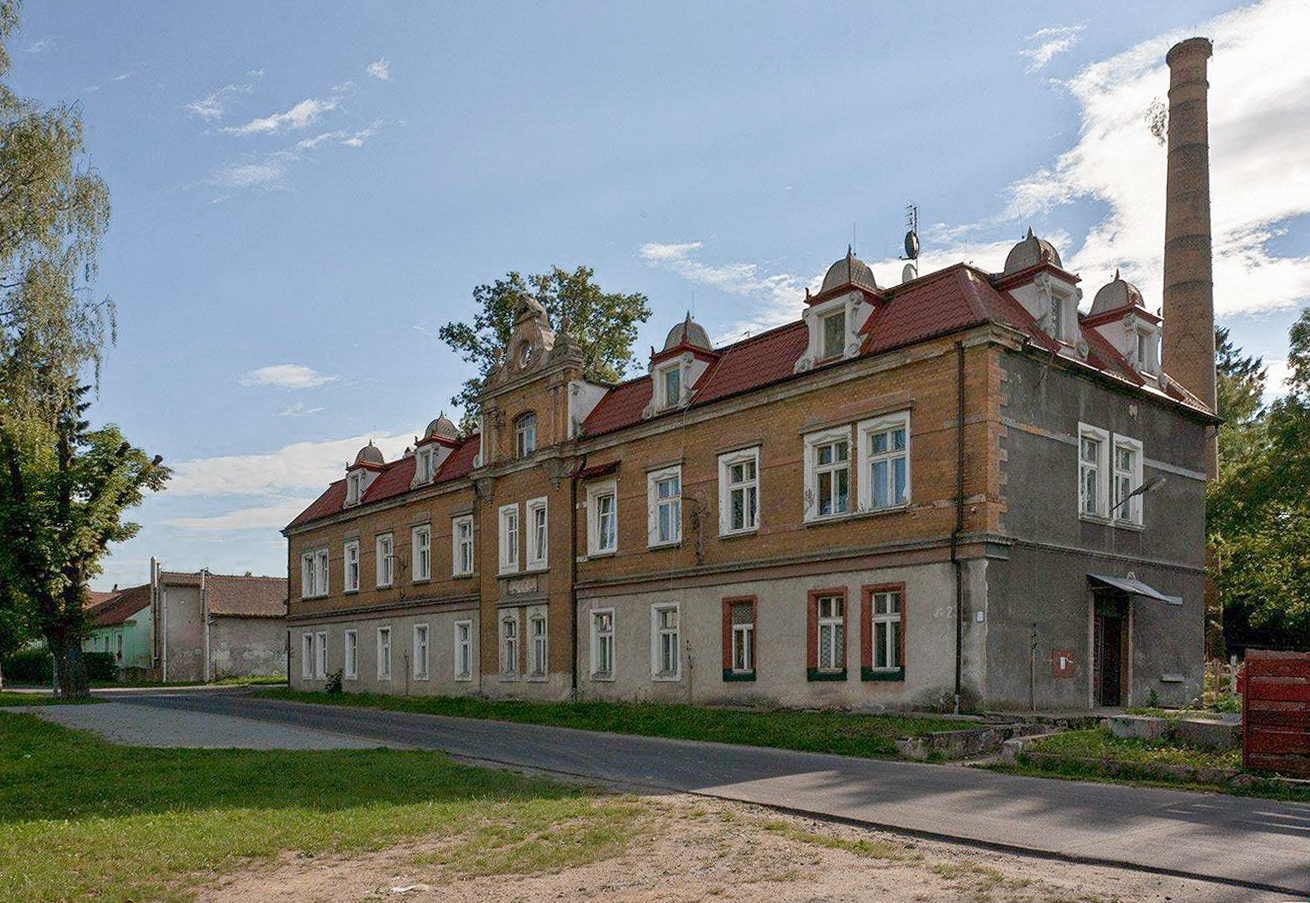
- Former spa house in Opolno-Zdrój
- Interactive map of Opolno-Zdrój
- Location within Poland
- Coordinates: 50°53′00″N 14°55′50″E
- Country: Poland
- Voivodeship: Lower Silesian
- County: Zgorzelec
- Gmina: Bogatynia
- Population: 1,100
- Time zone: UTC+1 (CET)
  - Summer (DST): UTC+2 (CEST)
- Vehicle registration: DZG

Opolno-Zdrój [ɔˈpɔlnɔ ˈzdrui̯] is a village in the administrative district of Gmina Bogatynia, within Zgorzelec County, Lower Silesian Voivodeship, in south-western Poland, close to the Czech and German borders.
