= Christiansdorf (Freiberg) =

Human settlement in Duchy of Saxony, Germany

Coordinates: 50°55′08″N 13°20′52″E

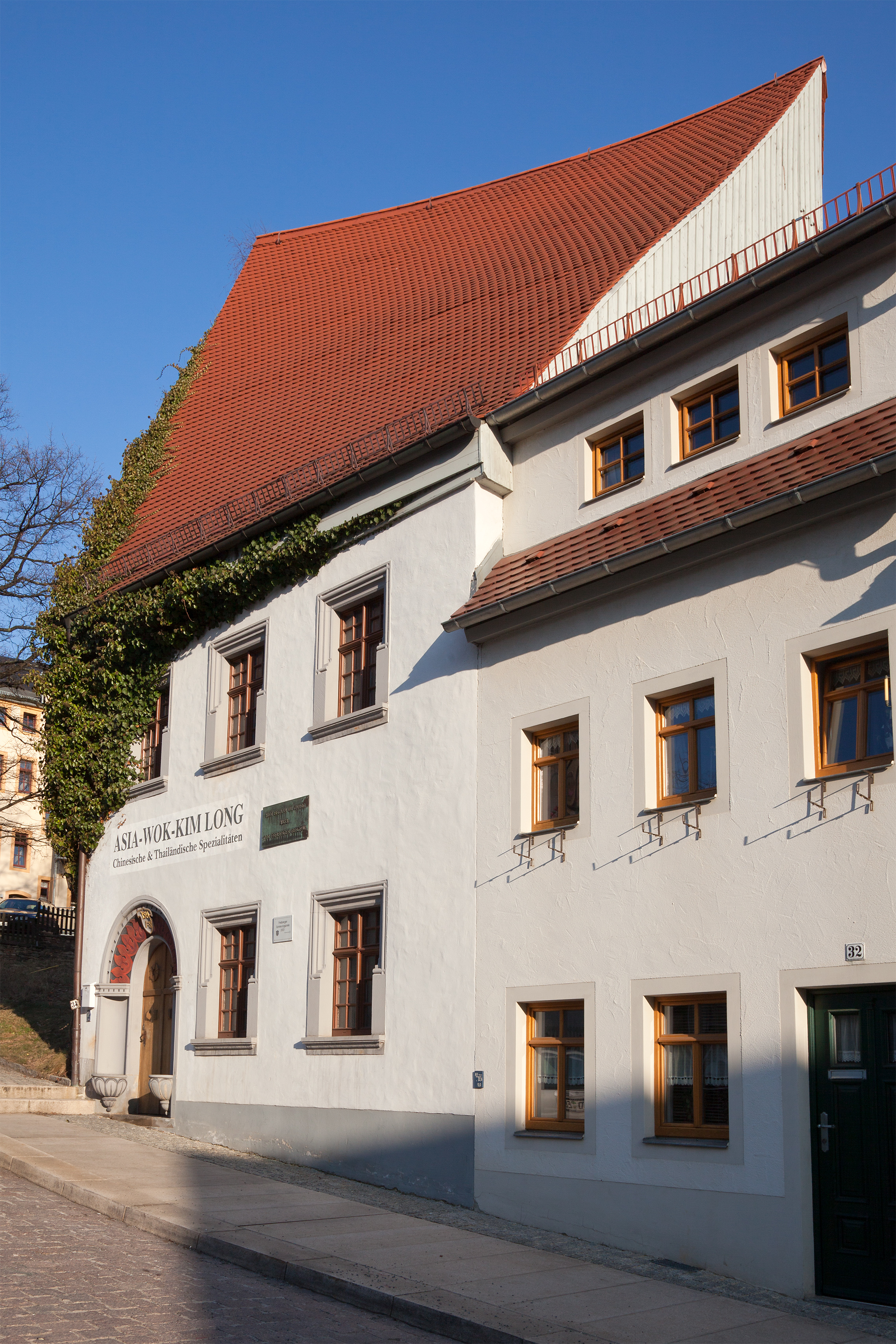
House on the Schüppchenberg

Christiansdorf, historically spelt Christianesdorph in 1183 and Christianisdorf in 1185, was a forest settlement in the Duchy of Saxony (the present day German state of Saxony) that only existed for a few years, but is credited as being the first place in the Ore Mountains that silver ore was discovered. The little mining settlement in the March of Meissen and was a forerunner of the present town of Freiberg, which itself was founded in the 1160s. Christiansdorf was located on the so-called Schüppchenberg hill, where the cul-de-sac of Berggasse now is.

According to oral tradition and legend, the first ore - sterling silver - in the Freiberg Mining Field, and also in the whole Ore Mountains, was discovered on the fields of Christiansdorf by the Schüppchenberg around 1168.
