= Sieniawka, Zgorzelec County =

Sieniawka
- Village
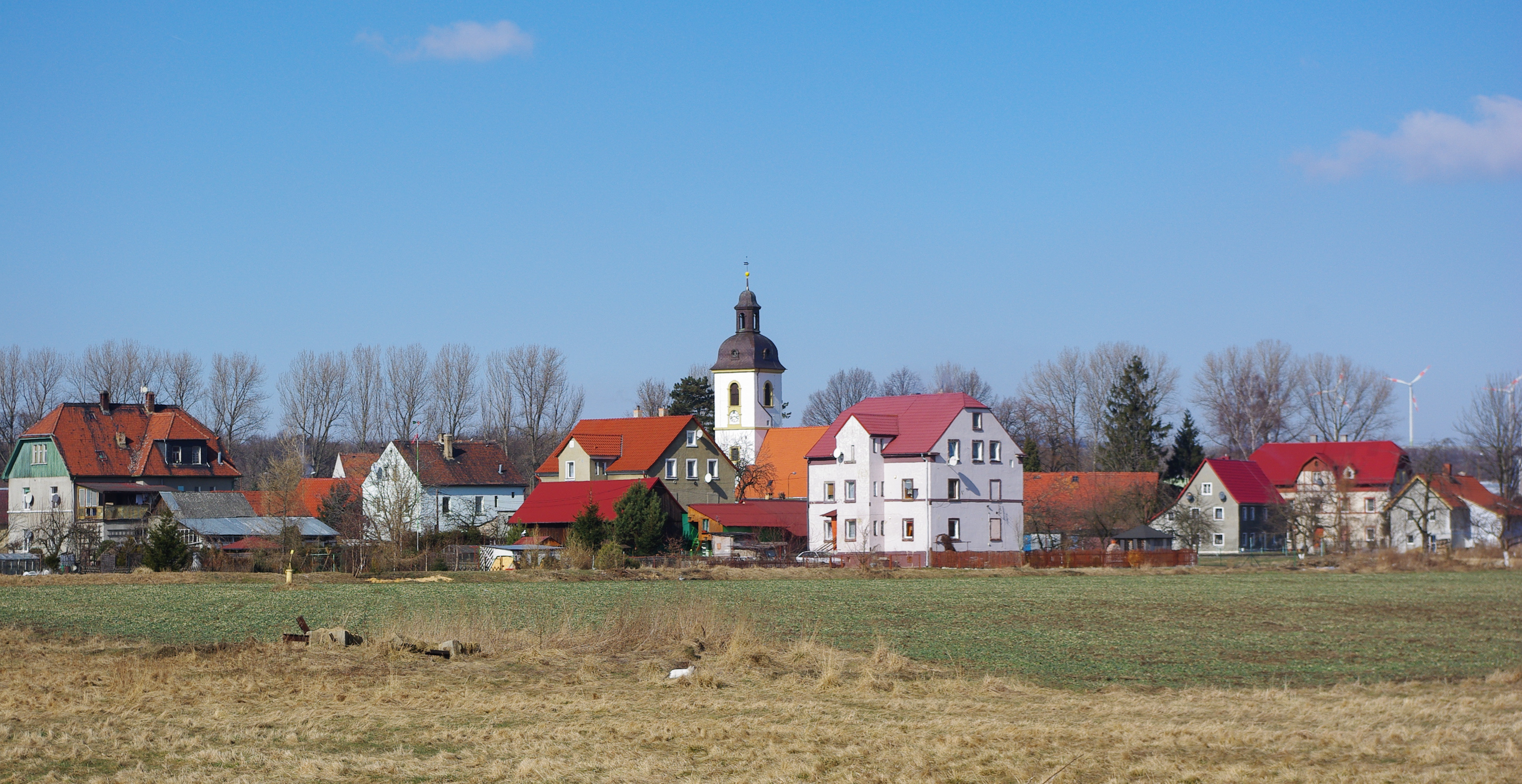
- Interactive map of Sieniawka
- Location within Poland
- Coordinates: 50°53′45″N 14°50′35″E
- Country: Poland
- Voivodeship: Lower Silesian
- County: Zgorzelec
- Gmina: Bogatynia
- Population: 678
- Time zone: UTC+1 (CET)
  - Summer (DST): UTC+2 (CEST)
- Postal code: 59-921

Sieniawka [ɕɛˈɲafka] (German: Kleinschönau or Klein-Schonau) is a village in the administrative district of Gmina Bogatynia, within Zgorzelec County, Lower Silesian Voivodeship, in south-western Poland, close to the Czech and German borders.

In the village there are two historic churches: the Immaculate Conception church and the Saint John the Baptist church. Also a hospital for the mentally ill is located in Sieniawka.

During World War II, in 1944–1945, the German administration operated the FAL Zittau subcamp of the Gross-Rosen concentration camp in the village, whose prisoners were Jews, initially only women, and from February 1945 also men.

Sieniawka railway station served the village until 1961.

== Gallery ==
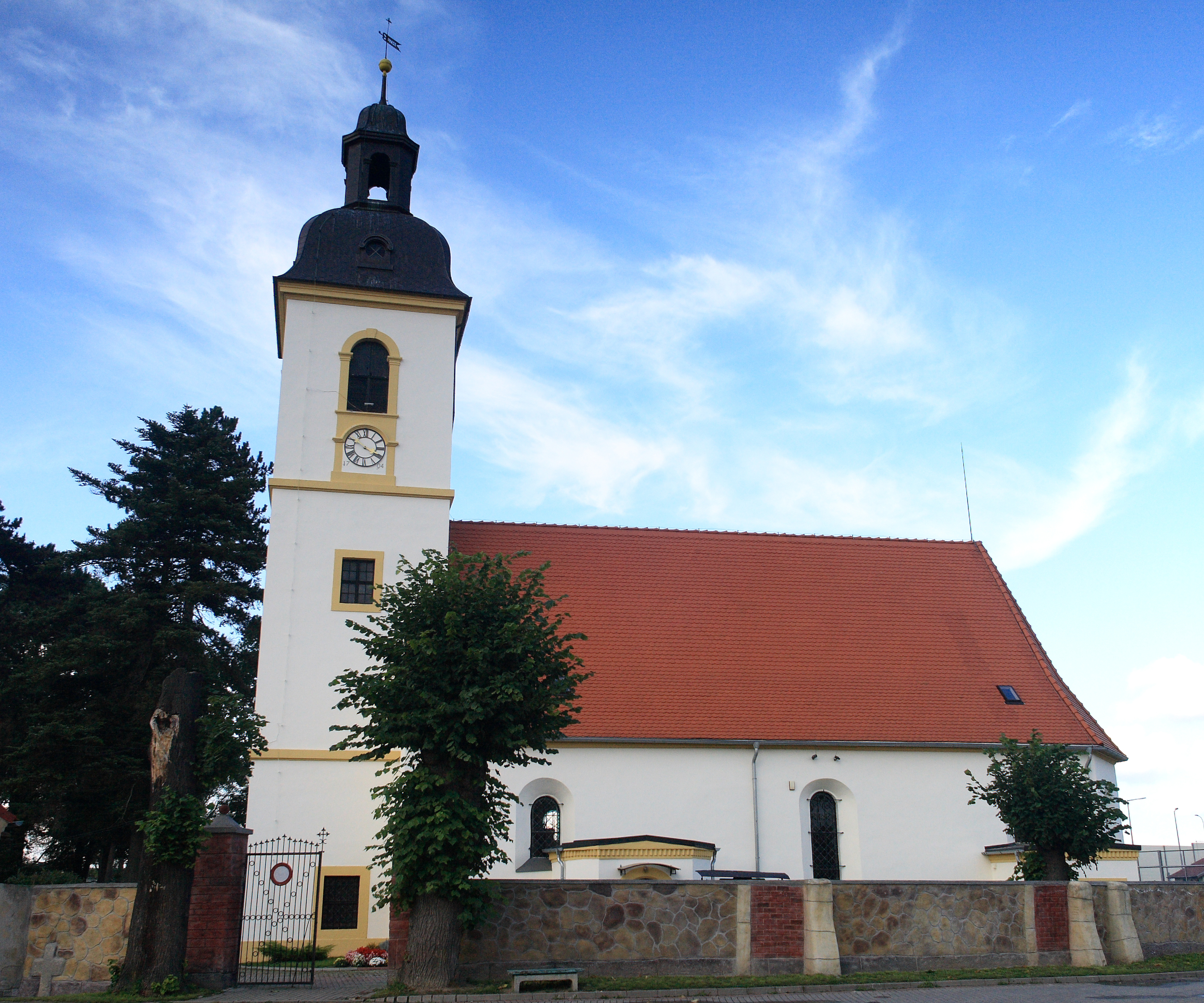
Immaculate Conception church

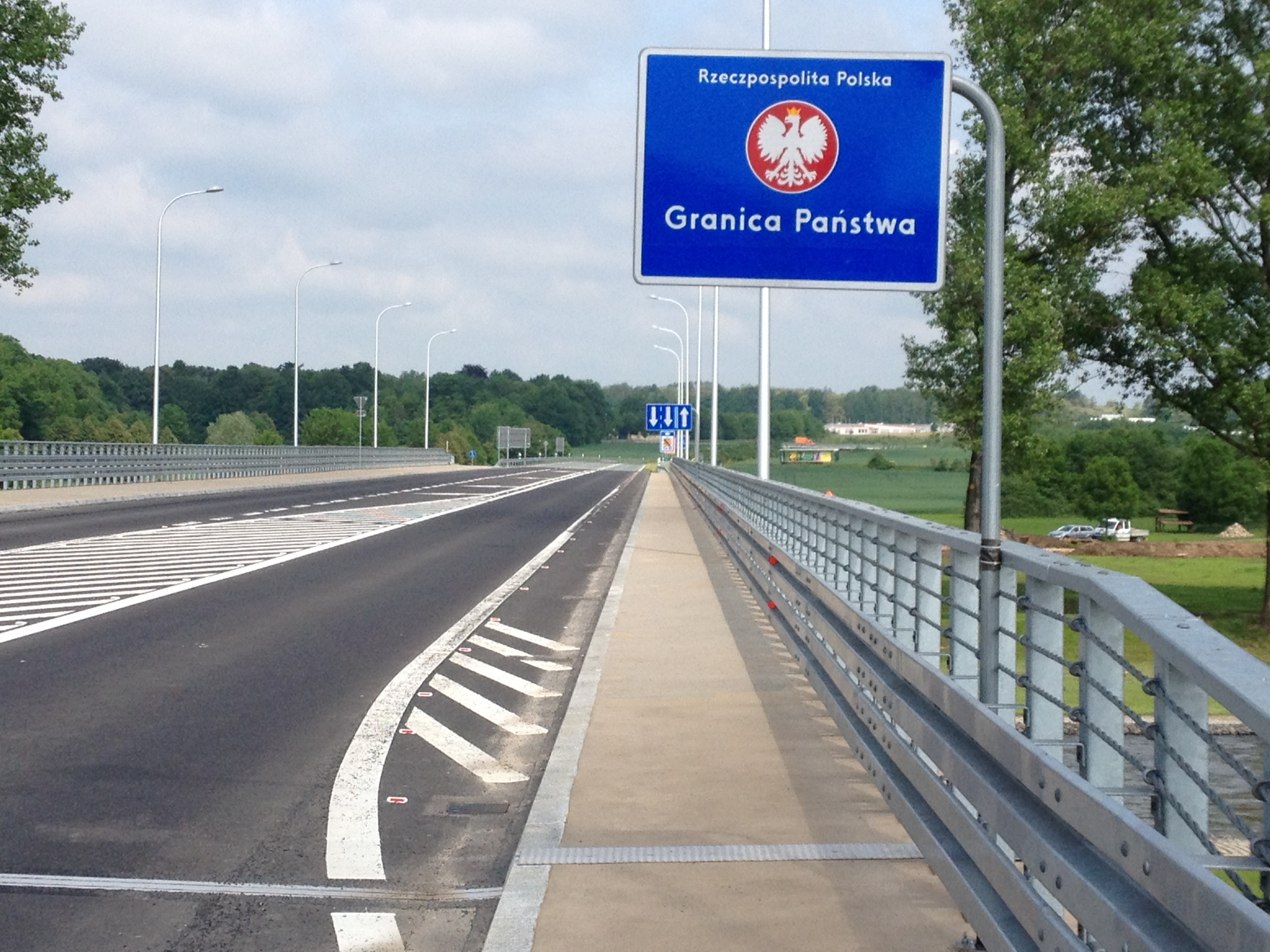
Bridge on the Polish-German border

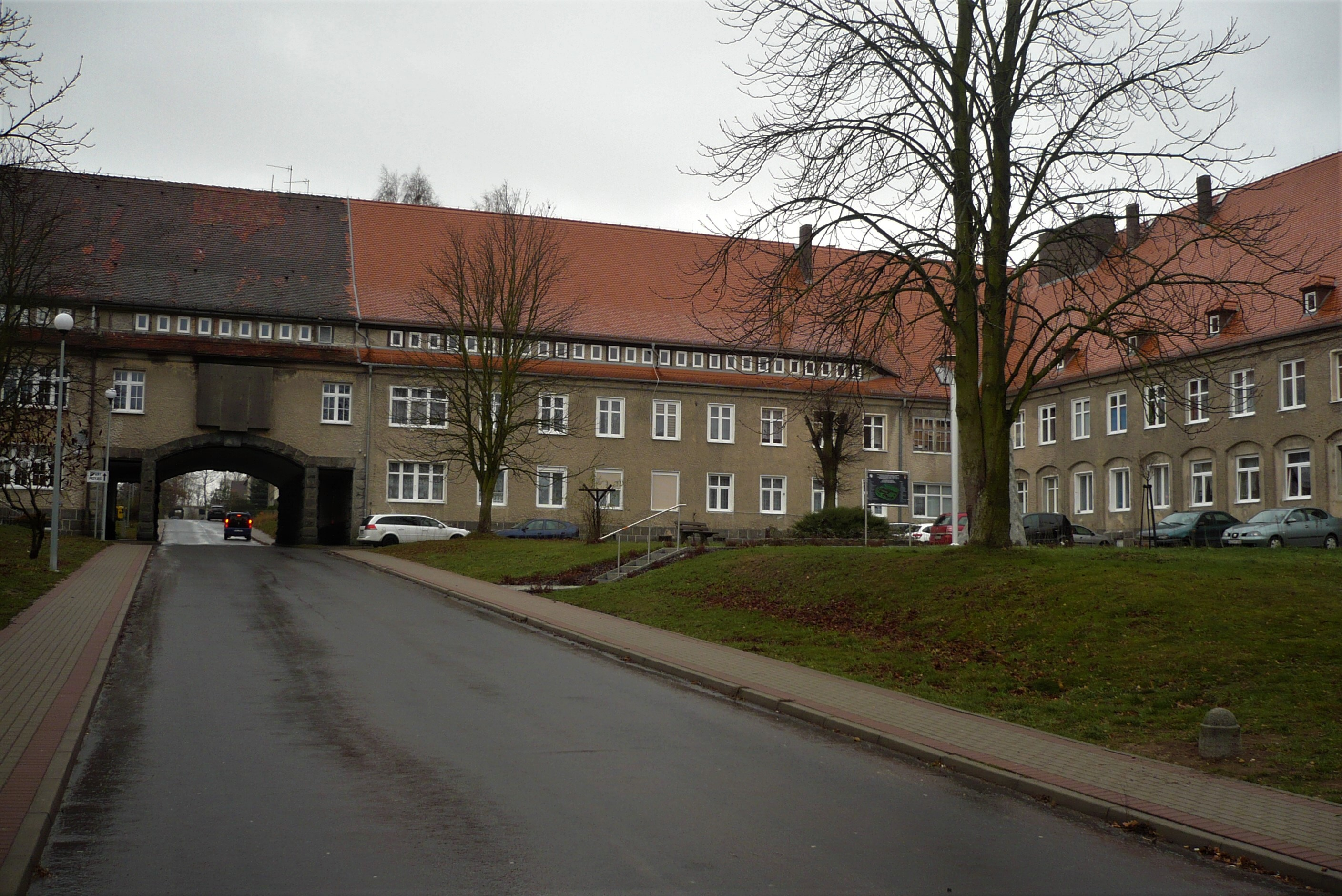
Hospital for the mentally ill

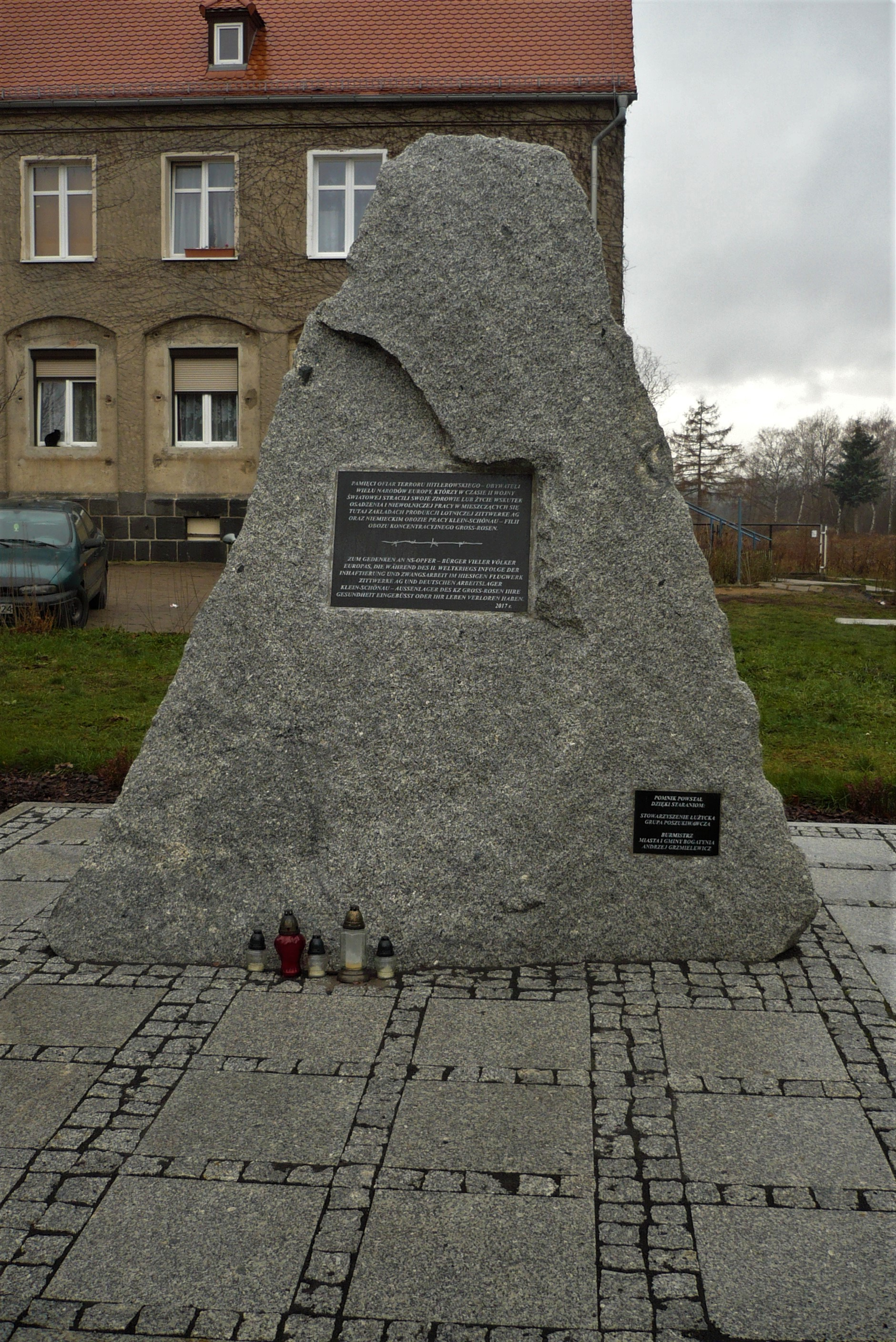
Memorial to the prisoners of the subcamp of the Nazi German Gross-Rosen concentration camp
