= Turów Power Station =

Coal-fired power station in Poland

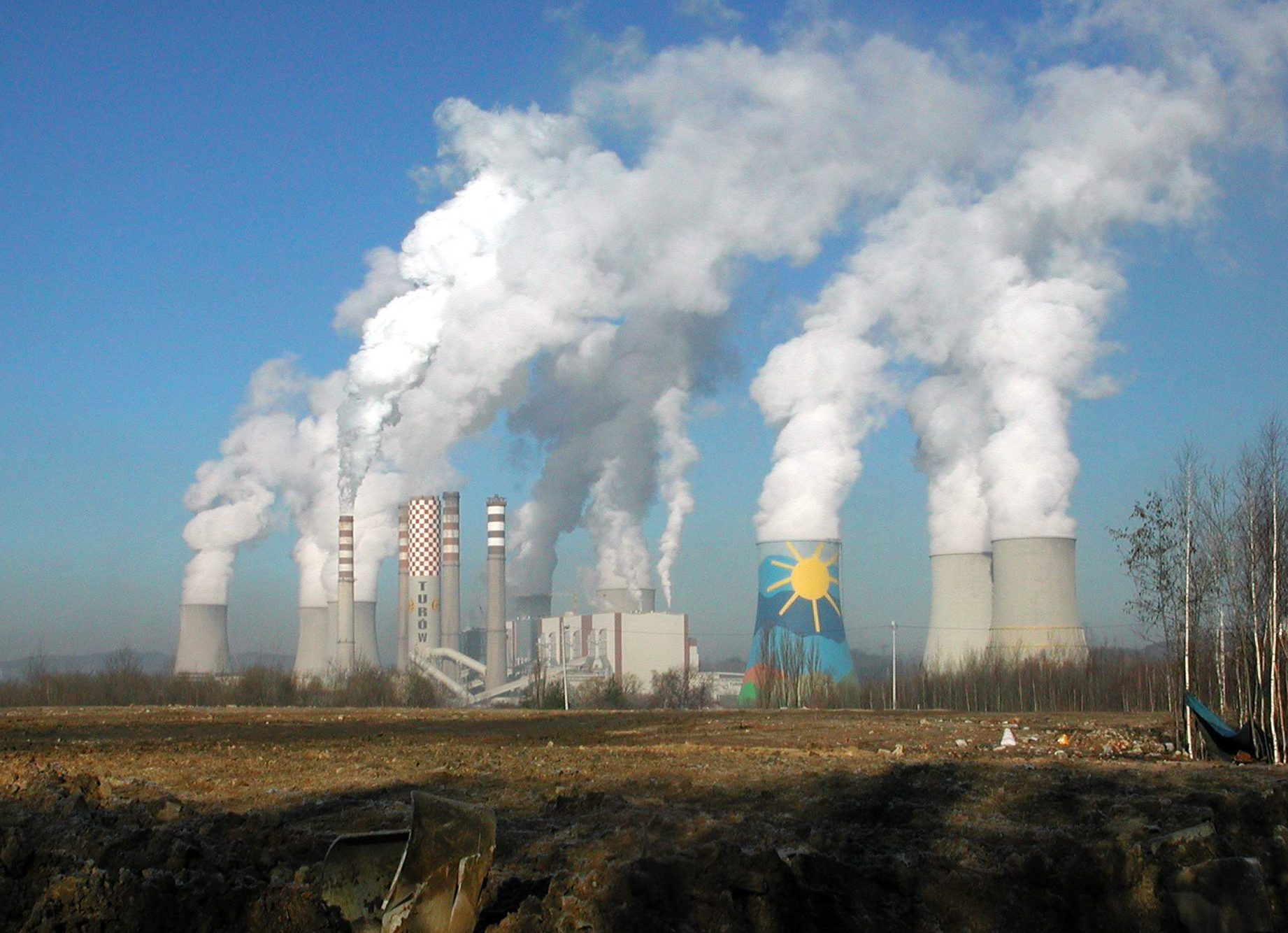
- Official name: Elektrownia Turów
- Country: Poland
- Location: Bogatynia, Lower Silesian Voivodeship
- Coordinates: 50°56′45″N 14°54′53″E
- Status: Operational
- Commission date: 1962
- Owner: PGE
- Operator: PGE GiEK – Oddział Elektrownia Turów
- Employees: 1250

Thermal power station
- Primary fuel: Lignite

Power generation
- Nameplate capacity: 1,950 MWe

External links
- Website: www.elturow.pgegiek.pl
- Commons: Related media on Commons

Turów Power Station is a coal-fired power station in Bogatynia, Poland. The power station, operated by state-owned Polska Grupa Energetyczna via Oddział Elektrownia Turów, is fuelled by lignite extracted from the nearby Turów coal mine. Operations at the plant began in 1962. As of 2021 it supplied 5% of Poland's electricity and is the sole provider of heat and hot water to hospitals, schools and homes in Bogatynia.

The plant initially consisted of ten 200 MW units, commissioned from 1962 to 1971. PGE undertook a US$1.6 billion modernization of units 1-6 of the plant in the early 1990s. Units 7-10 have been phased out. Unit 7 was retired in 2003. In 2010, Unit 8 was retired. Units 9 and 10 were decommissioned in 2012–2013. PGE has repowered Units 5 and 6 to co-incinerate biomass, and plans for co-firing of biomass in boilers 1, 2, 3, and 4. Units 1, 2, and 3 have been upgraded from 200 MW to 235 MW each. The plant's remaining six units have a combined capacity of 1,305 MW.

A new 496 MW unit (Unit 11) built by a consortium of Mitsubishi Hitachi Power Systems Europe GmbH (MHPSE), Budimex S.A. and Técnicas Reunidas, SA was brought online in May 2021.

== Environmental impact ==
In a WWF report published in May 2007, the power plant was recognized as the largest greenhouse gas emitter in Poland and eighth in Europe in terms of emissions.

In 2019, lignite burned at the plant produced 5.5m tonnes of CO_{2}, making it the fifth largest source of greenhouse gas emissions in Poland.
