= Markocice railway station =

Former railway station in Bogatynia, south-western Poland

Markocice

General information
- Location: Markocice, Bogatynia, Lower Silesian Voivodeship; Poland
- Coordinates: 50°53′34.5″N 14°59′05.7″E
- Owner: Polish State Railways
- Line: Zittau–Heřmanice railway (closed)
- Platforms: 1

History
- Opened: 25 August 1900
- Closed: 30 June 1961
- Former names: Markersdorf Haltepunkt (1900–1902); Markersdorf bei Reichenau Haltepunkt (1902–1917); Markersdorf bei Reichenau (Sachsen) Haltepunkt (1917–1945); Markocice Przystanek (1945–1948)
Location
- Location within Poland Location within Lower Silesian Voivodeship

Markocice (German: Markersdorf Haltepunkt) was a railway station on the Zittau–Heřmanice railway in the Markocice district of Bogatynia, Zgorzelec County, within the Lower Silesian Voivodeship in south-western Poland.

== History ==
The station was opened by Royal Saxon State Railways on 25 August 1900 as Markersdorf Haltepunkt part of the Zittau–Heřmanice railway. The station was renamed to Markersdorf bei Reichenau Haltepunkt in 1902, and then to Markersdorf bei Reichenau (Sachsen) Haltepunkt for designation in 1917.

After World War II, the area came under Polish administration. As a result, the station was taken over by Polish State Railways, and was renamed to Markocice Przystanek, and later to its modern name, Markocice, in 1948.

Polish State Railways resumed passenger services on 20 May 1951 between Sieniawka and this station. The station closed on 30 June 1961.

== Former services ==
Preceding station	Disused railways	Following station
Terminus	Polish State Railways; Zittau–Heřmanice	Bogatynia Wschodnia towards Sieniawka
