= Turów Coal Mine =

Lignite mine in southwest Poland

Coordinates: 50°54′45″N 14°54′11″E

Turów coal mine
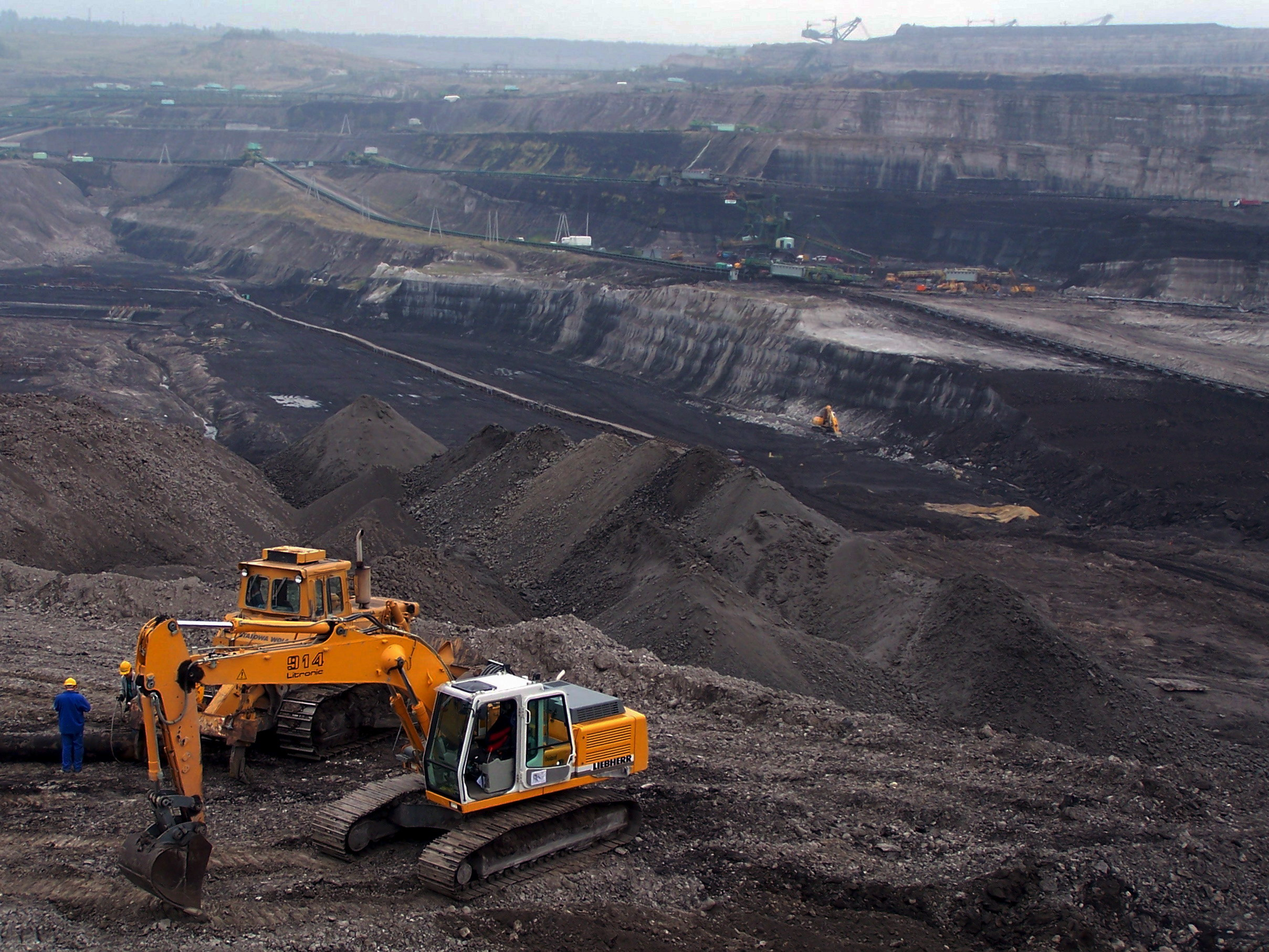

- Location within Poland Location within Lower Silesian Voivodeship
- Location: Bogatynia, Lower Silesian Voivodeship, Poland
- Products: Coal, Aggregates, Clay
- Production: 27,700,000
- Opened: 1904
- Company: Polska Grupa Energetyczna

The Turów coal mine (Polish: Kopalnia Węgla Brunatnego Turów S.A.) or KWB Turów, is a large open pit mine in the southwest of Poland, located outside Bogatynia, Lower Silesia. It feeds the nearby Turów Power Station. In March 2024 a Warsaw court found the EIA for mining from 2026 to be invalid, but the owner is appealing. Unlike the other coal-dependent parts of Poland, a just transition for coal phase-out has not yet been planned as of 2024.

== Operations ==
Situated 55 km west of Jelenia Góra, 80 km east of Dresden, Germany, and 20 km northwest of Liberec, Czech Republic, the Turów mine forms part of an area widely known as the "Black Triangle" due to its past heavy industrial pollution, covering portions of eastern Germany, southwestern Poland and northern Czech Republic. The Turów mine, operated by Polska Grupa Energetyczna, represents one of the largest lignite reserves in Poland, with an estimated reserve of 760 million tonnes of coal. The annual coal production of Turów is around 27.7 million tonnes.

Lignite was found near Turasów in 1740. Between 1836 and 1869, almost 70 shafts were excavated. The owners of these mines organized the joint stock company Hercules in 1904, and three years later began strip mining. In 1925 the cap rock was dumped north of the mine. After the Second World War, in 1947, a Polish organization took the mine over from the Soviet military administration and KWB Turów came into existence.

== Power Station ==
Nearby Turów Power Station is fuelled by lignite extracted from the Turów coal mine. The first unit of the power station was commissioned in 1962. The power station is the fifth largest source of greenhouse emissions in Poland and was the eighth least efficient power station in the EU in 2007. A new 496 MW unit was brought online in May 2021.

In 2022 the plant was the 9th biggest carbon emitter in the European Union, with over 11 million tCO2e.

== Legality ==
The mine's license was set to expire in April 2020, but in March 2020, the Polish government extended it by another six years. The Polish government agreed to PGE Group's wish to continue mining at the site until 2044, when its coal deposits are expected to be fully depleted. Later, the Polish government announced that the mine would be shut down by 2044, claiming this to be in line with the EU's plans to cut emissions. PGE Group's move to expand the mine is facing opposition from the Czech government, as nearby Czech and German communities say that the environmental impact from the mine is severely affecting their quality of life, and threatening survival of several villages close to the border by causing their wells to dry up. According to a geological study, continued mining also risks causing soil subsidence in the German town of Zittau. In February 2021, the Czech Republic sued Poland over the mine at the European Court of Justice, the first time that an EU member state had sued another one over an environmental issue.

In May 2021, Poland defied an injunction by the court that ordered the immediate closure of the mine, claiming it would have an adverse impact on the country's energy system and lead to the loss of thousands of jobs. The claim was refuted by studies of the renewable energy alternatives for the region, which were estimated to produce between 800 and 4,100 jobs more than the coal mine and plant while saving over €13 billion in electricity production costs over 25 years.

Because Poland had not ceased lignite extraction activities at the Turów mine, on 20 September 2021, the Vice-President of the Court ordered Poland to pay the European Commission a daily penalty payment of half a million euros, but the Polish continued to defy the ruling. After Poland settled the case with the Czech Republic in 2022, the Court in 2024 confirmed a fine of 68 million euros for the delay in compliance.

In 2023 the Polish government once again renewed the plant's permit until 2044. The decision is subject to legal proceedings, with one case at Voivodship Administrative Court in Warsaw suspended in 2023 until other proceedings are resolved.

== Environmental impact ==
The Turów coal mine has a significant impact on surrounding areas and their ground and surface waters. An analysis of hydrologist Sylwester Kraśnicki predicts devastating effects on local rivers, including droughts, water shortage, and continued degradation of chemical compositions of the Lusatian Neisse river, among others. Water shortage already causes the surrounding nature to die, while some villages lost access to running water and have to rely on firefighters to deliver water tanks.

== Gallery ==
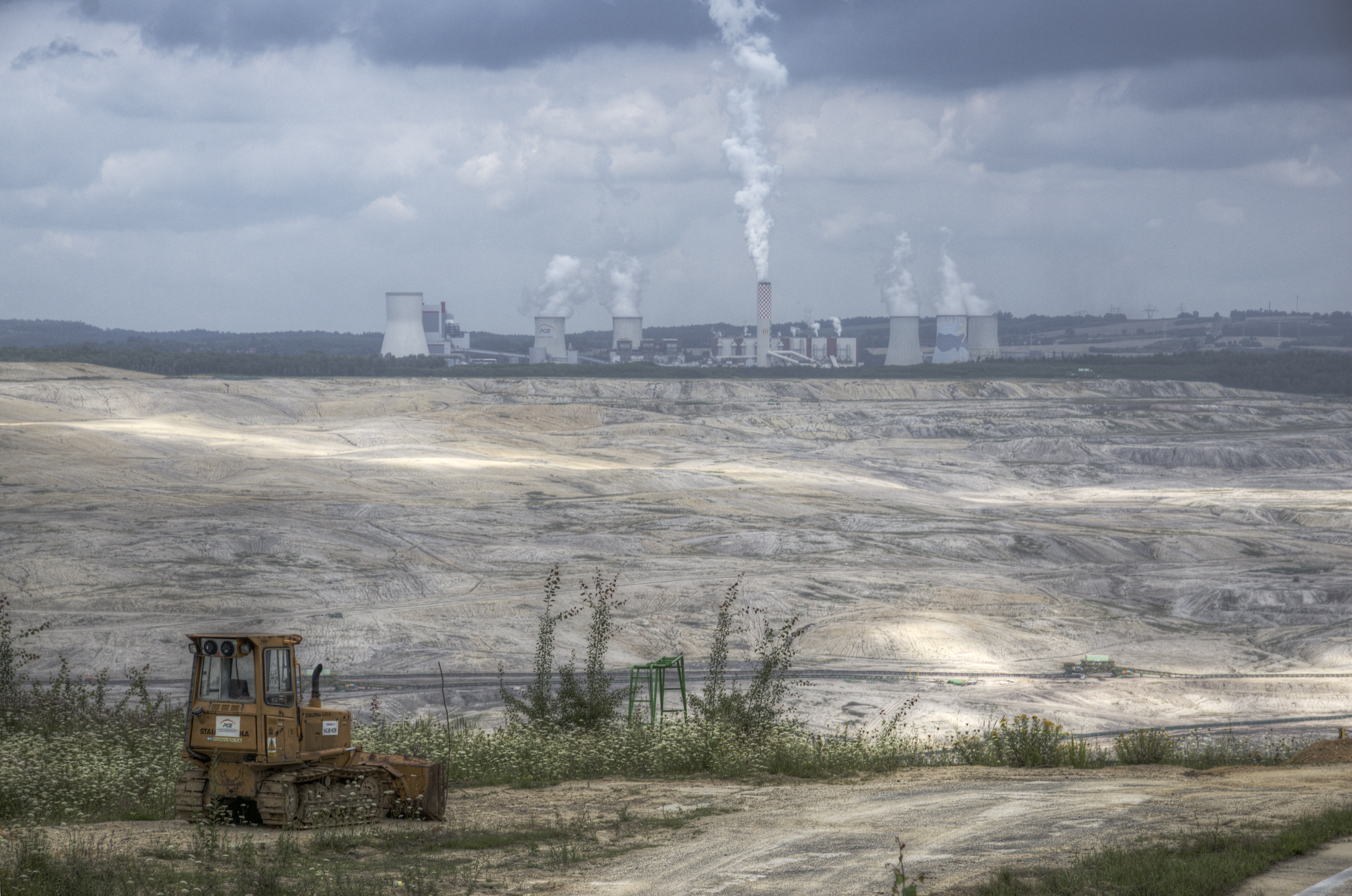
Coal mine and Turów power station

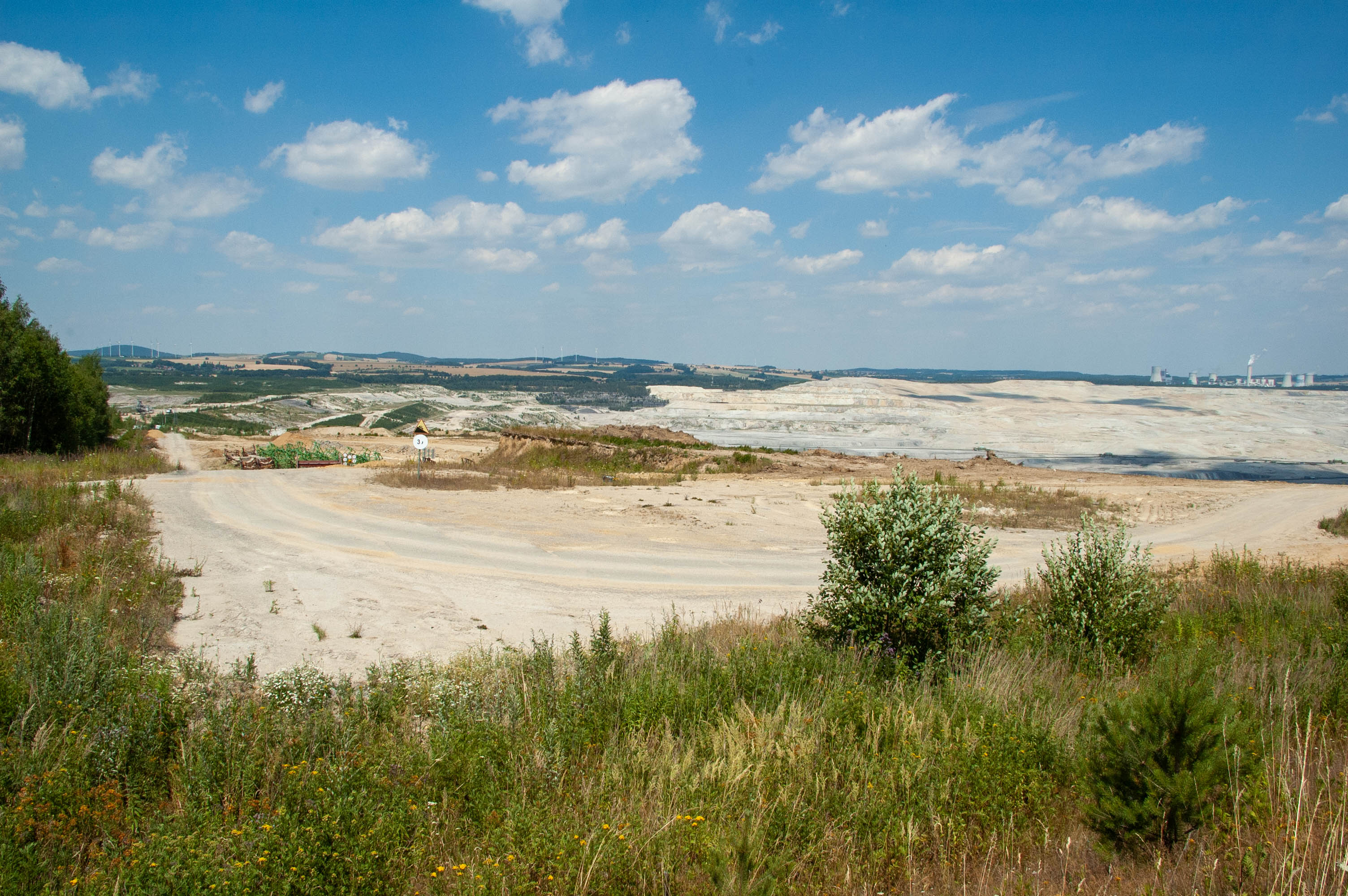
Mine from the south in 2019

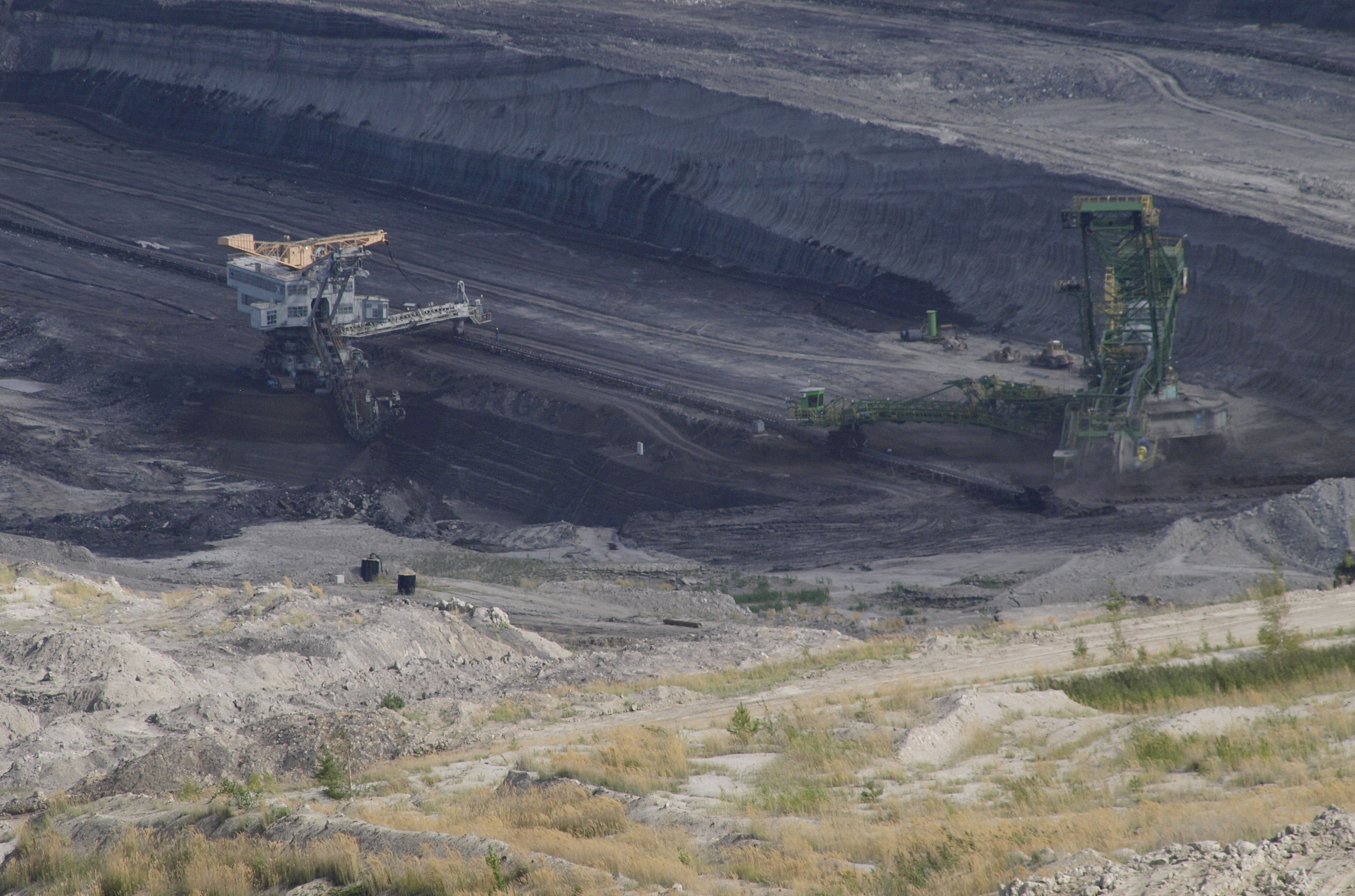
Coal mining (2012)

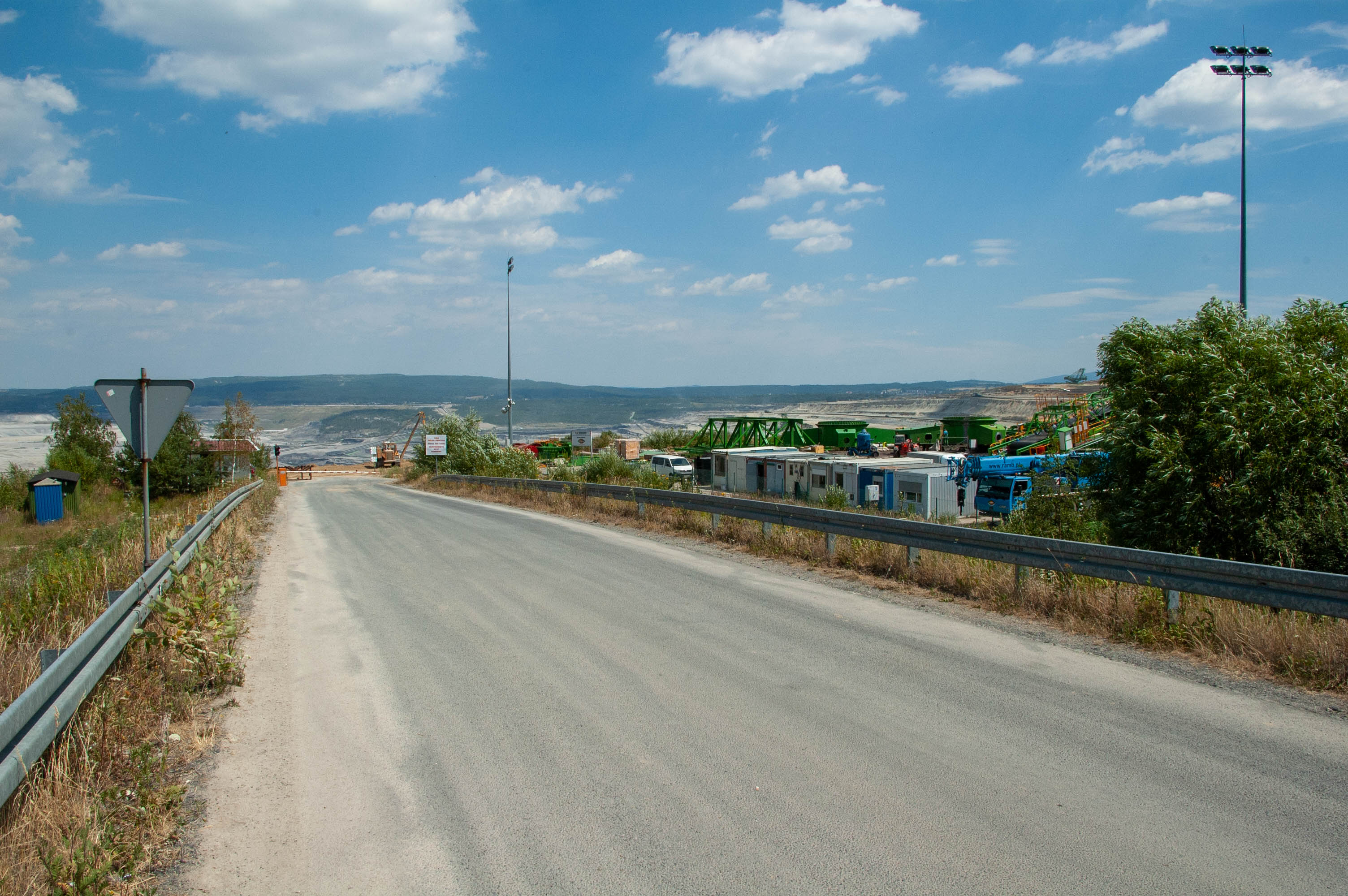
Mining structures by the road on the south

== See also ==
- List of power stations in Poland
