= Sieniawka railway station =

Former railway station in Sieniawka, south-western Poland

Sieniawka
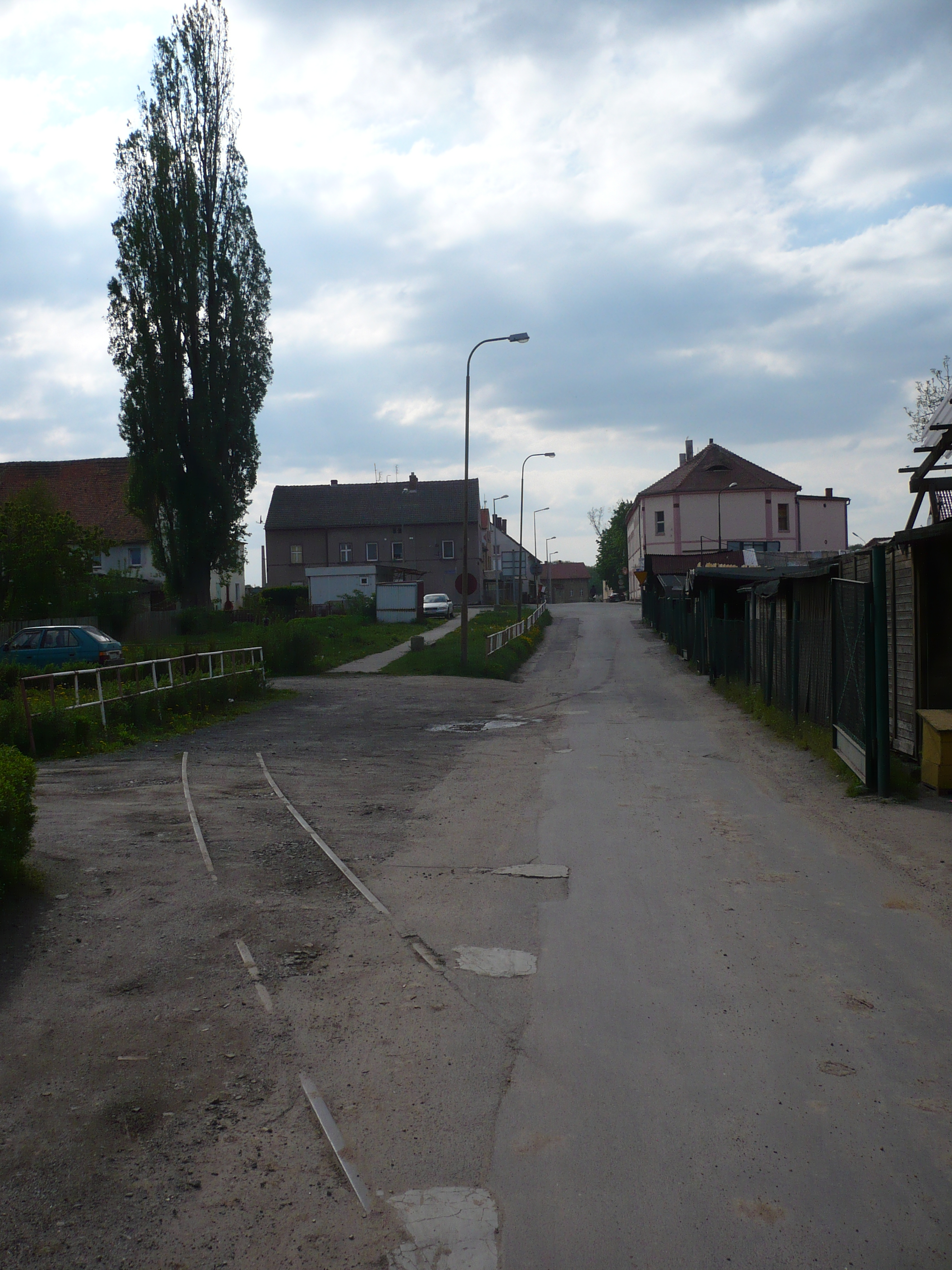
- Former tracks in 2010 which once led to the station, now dismantled

General information
- Location: Sieniawka, Lower Silesian Voivodeship; Poland
- Coordinates: 50°53′48.8″N 14°50′44.9″E
- Owner: Polish State Railways
- Line: Zittau–Heřmanice railway (closed)
- Platforms: 1

History
- Opened: 11 November 1884
- Closed: 30 June 1961
- Former names: Kleinschönau (1884–1945); Sieniawka (1945–1951); Łąki (1951–1952)
Location
- Location within Poland Location within Lower Silesian Voivodeship

Sieniawka (German: Kleinschönau) was a railway station on the Zittau–Heřmanice railway in the village of Sieniawka, Zgorzelec County, within the Lower Silesian Voivodeship in south-western Poland.

== History ==
The station was opened by Royal Saxon State Railways on 11 November 1884 as Kleinschönau part of the Zittau–Heřmanice railway.

After World War II, the area came under Polish administration. As a result, the station was taken over by Polish State Railways, and was renamed to Sieniawka. The station was renamed once again to Łąki in 1951, which was reverted the following year

Polish State Railways resumed passenger services on 20 May 1951 between this station (serving as a terminus) and Markocice. Prior to 1945, services continued west into Zittau. The station closed on 30 June 1961.

== Former services ==
Preceding station	Disused railways	Following station
Biedrzychowice Górne towards Markocice	Polish State Railways; Zittau–Heřmanice	Terminus
