= Bogatynia =

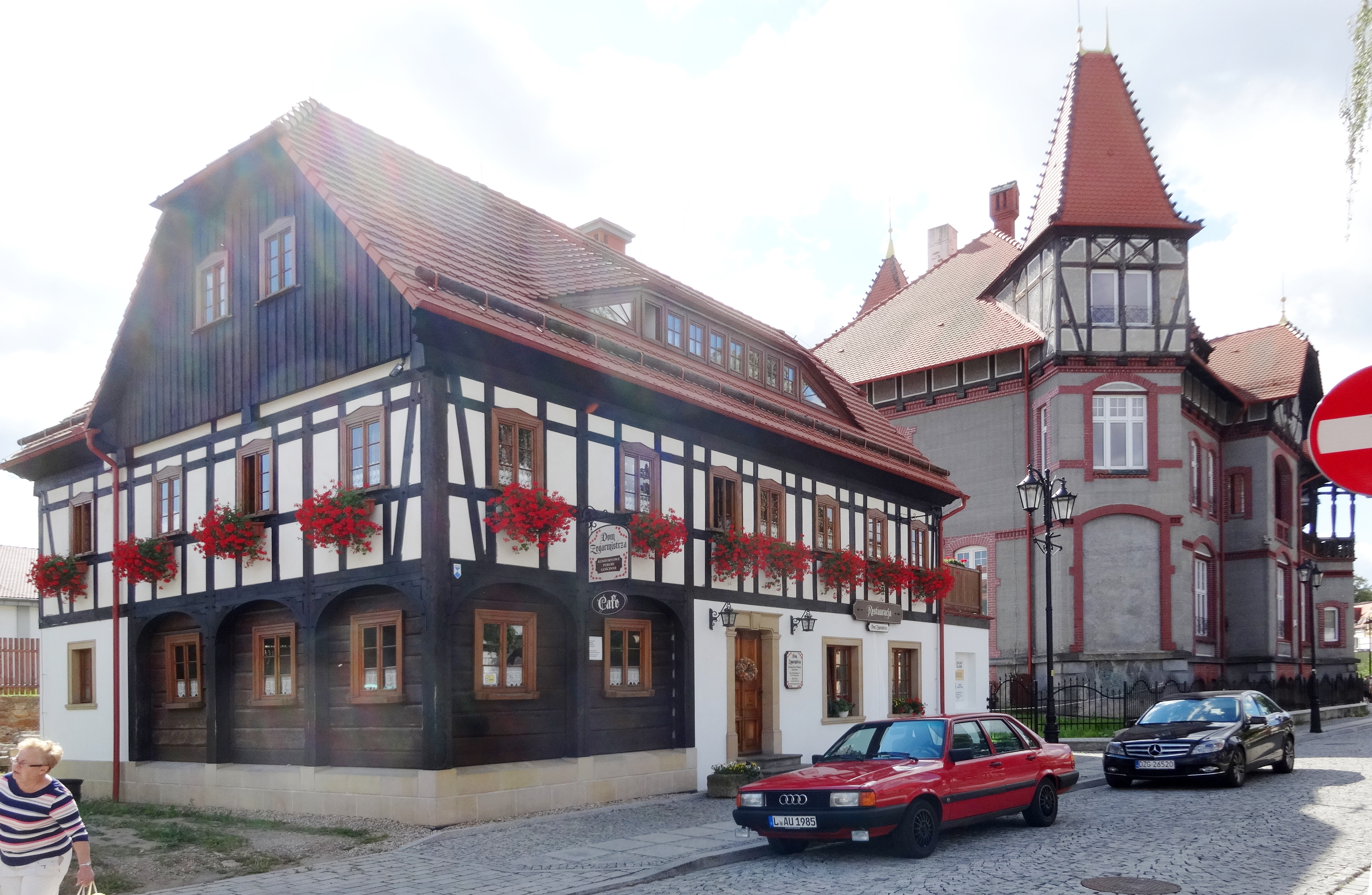
- Watchmaker's house

- Flag Coat of arms
- Interactive map of Bogatynia
- Location within Poland
- Coordinates: 50°54′25″N 14°57′25″E
- Country: Poland
- Voivodeship: Lower Silesian
- County: Zgorzelec
- Gmina: Bogatynia
- First mentioned: 1262
- Town rights: 1945

Government
  - Mayor: Wojciech Dobrołowicz (PiS)

Area
  - Total: 59.88 km^{2} (23.12 sq mi)

Population (31 December 2021)
  - Total: 16,460
  - Density: 275/km^{2} (710/sq mi)
- Time zone: UTC+1 (CET)
  - Summer (DST): UTC+2 (CEST)
- Postal code: 59-916 (Turoszów, Zatonie Kolonia, Trzciniec Górny, Trzciniec Dolny and Stare Zatonie districts), 59-920
- Area code: +48 75
- Car plates: DZG
- Website: http://www.bogatynia.pl

Bogatynia (Polish pronunciation: [bɔɡaˈtɨɲa]; German: Reichenau in Sachsen; Czech: Bohatyně; Upper Sorbian: Rychnow) is a town in Zgorzelec County, Lower Silesian Voivodeship, in south-western Poland. As of December 2021, the town had a population of 16,460.

== Geography ==
The municipal area forms Poland's "Turoszów panhandle" (Polish: Worek Turoszowski) between the Czech town of Frýdlant in the east and the German town of Zittau in the west. To the southwest, the tripoint of the Czech, German, and Polish borders is located on the Neisse River. The town lies approximately 27 kilometres (17 mi) south of Zgorzelec, and 147 kilometres (91 mi) west of the regional capital Wrocław. The town has an area of 59.88 square kilometres (23.12 square miles).

== History ==
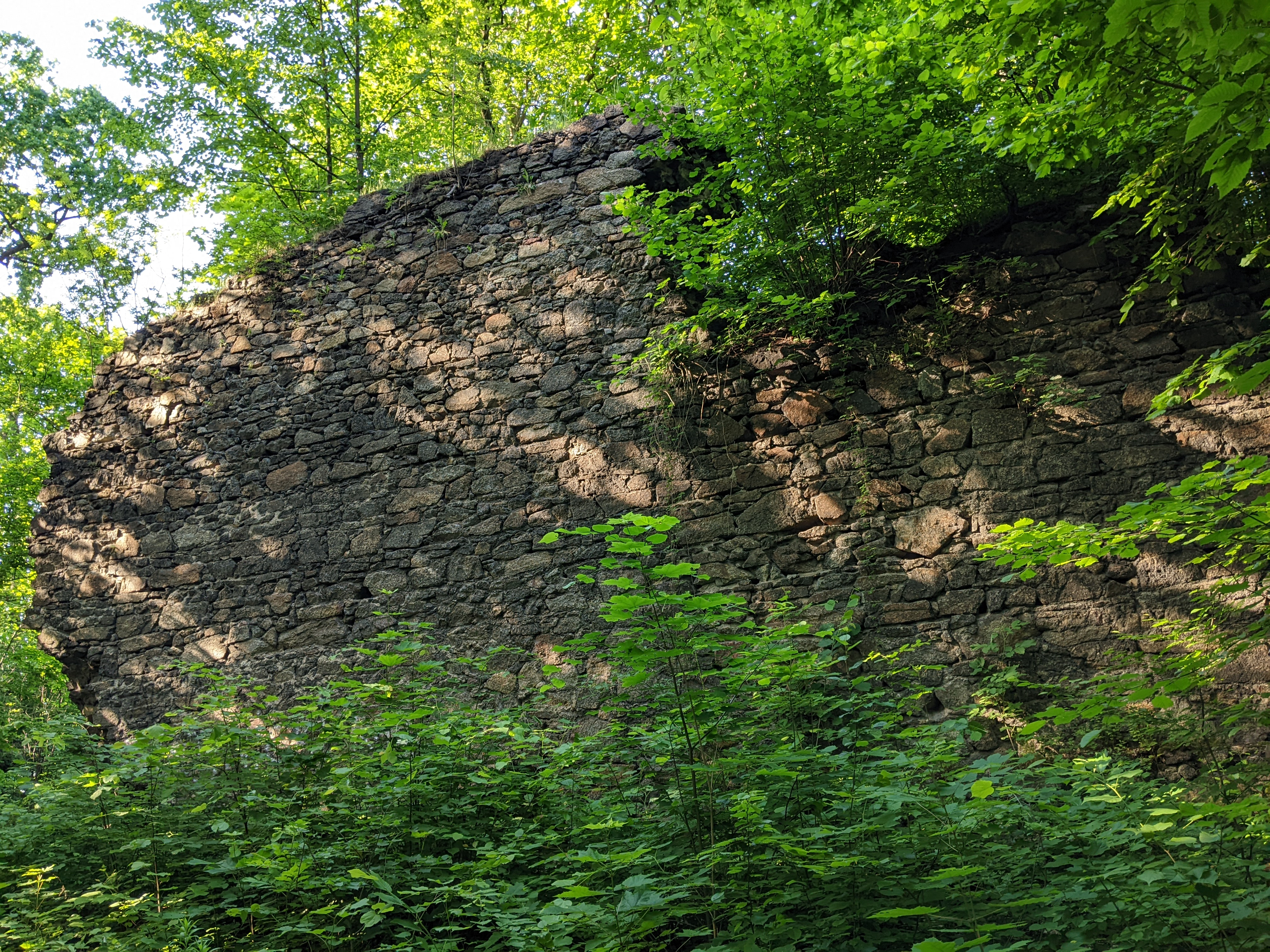
Remains of a medieval castle in Trzciniec

The settlement of Richnow (modern German: Reichenau, i.e. 'rich vale') in the historical region of Upper Lusatia was first mentioned in a 1262 deed, then a possession of Cistercian St. Marienthal Abbey near Ostritz. It prospered from its location on an important trade route connecting Dresden, residence of the Meissen margraves, with Świdnica in Silesia. Also in 1262, the castle in the present-day district of Trzciniec was first mentioned. Initially a part of the Kingdom of Bohemia, the settlements passed to the Duchy of Jawor of fragmented Poland in 1319, again to Bohemia in 1346,, and to the Saxon Electorate by the 1635 Peace of Prague. From 1697 to 1763 it was also ruled by Kings of Poland in personal union. The castle, which served as a hideout for robbers, was destroyed in 1399 by the forces of the Lusatian League.

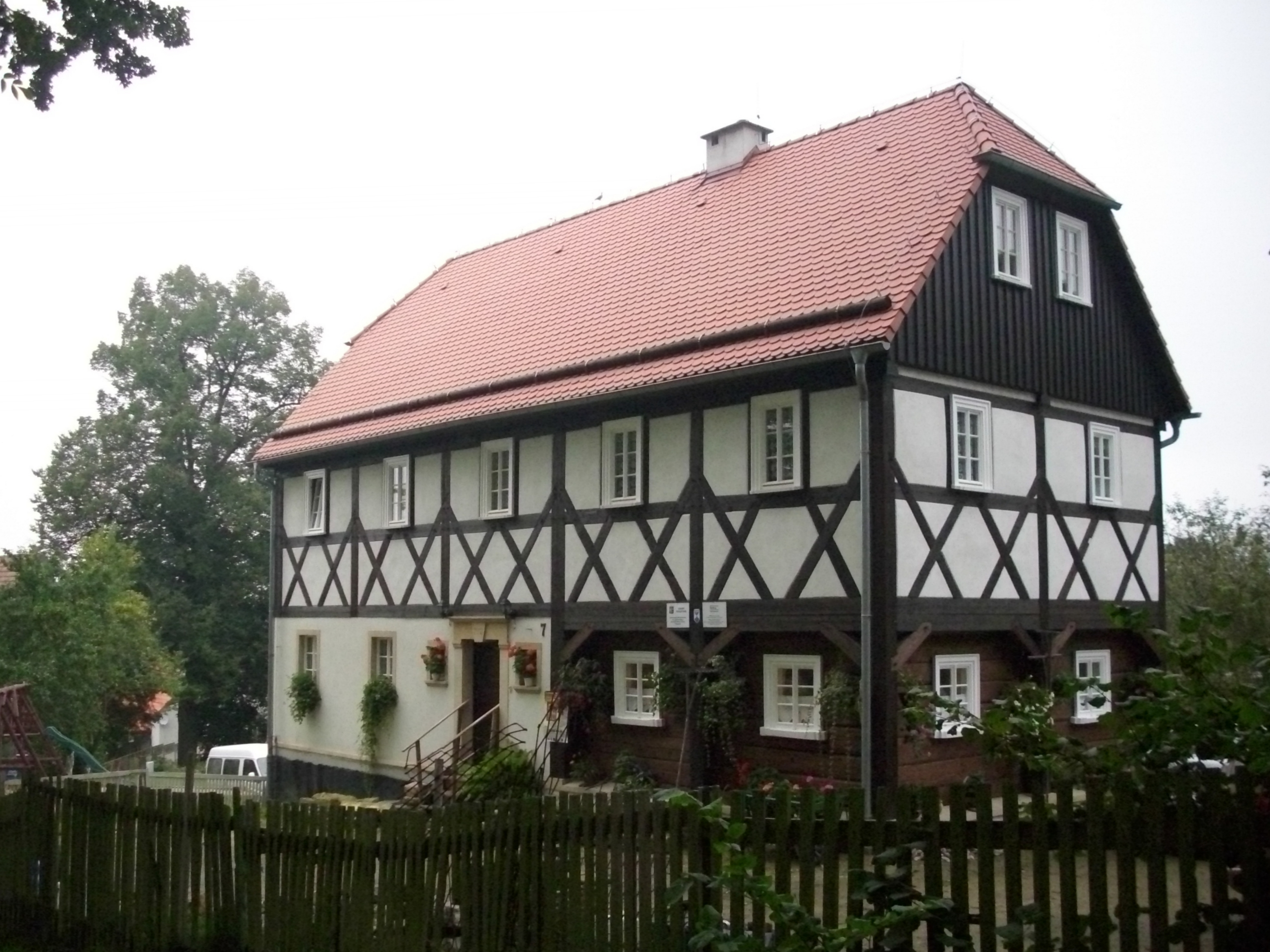
Historical timber-framed house, typical to the area

The settlement suffered during the Hussite Wars (1425–1430) and Thirty Years' War (1618–1648). During the Great Northern War it was plundered by Swedish troops. Many inhabitants died in the War of the Polish Succession, fighting on the side of Augustus III of Poland. During the Seven Years' War, the occupying Austrian and Prussian armies imposed contributions on the inhabitants, confiscated food and even pillaged the village. In 1813, during the Napoleonic Wars and Polish national liberation fights, joint Polish-French forces commanded by Prince Józef Poniatowski were stationed in the village and later also Russian troops marched through the village. As Saxony had sided with the French Empire during the Napoleonic Wars, it had to cede the northeastern part of Upper Lusatia to Prussia according to the Final Act of the 1815 Vienna Congress. After the new border had been drawn, the village was the only possession east of the Neisse River that remained within Saxony. From 1871 to 1945, it was part of the German Reich. In the interbellum the settlement suffered economically from inflation and the Great Depression.

The town used to be connected via narrow gauge railway lines opened in 1884 to Zittau and to the Bohemian border, where it was linked with the Frýdlant–Heřmanice Railway in 1900. Cross border service discontinued in 1945, and the railway line was closed in 1961.

Spared from damage during World War II, with the implementation of the Oder-Neisse line according to the post-war Potsdam Agreement, it passed to Poland. In 1945 it was granted a town charter. It is therefore the only municipality in Poland which passed to Poland in 1945 and had not been part of Prussia (but of the Free State of Saxony). From 1945 to 1947 the town was renamed Rychwald followed by the current name. In 1973, town limits were expanded.

On August 8, 2010, the Miedzianka stream flooded the entire central part of the town, causing heavy damage and destroying several historic buildings. The cause of the flooding was extremely heavy rain and the resulting swelling of the river Miedzianka. Two people died.

== Economy ==
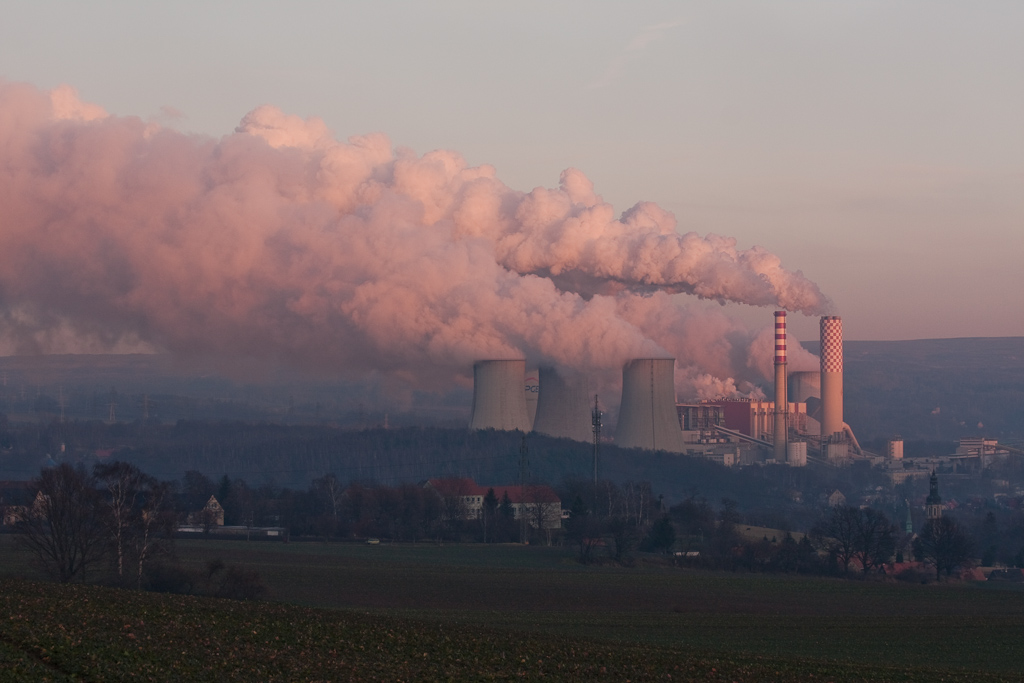
Turów Power Station

Today Bogatynia is one of the richest towns per capita in Poland, due to its two principal enterprises: the Turów Coal Mine, a large open-pit on the grounds of the former Rybarzowice village, and the associated thermal power station, Elektrownia Turów, operated by the Polska Grupa Energetyczna, the third-largest of the country. The word bogaty in Polish describes a rich or wealthy person - a calque from the town's original German name, Reichenau (reich: "rich").

== International relations ==
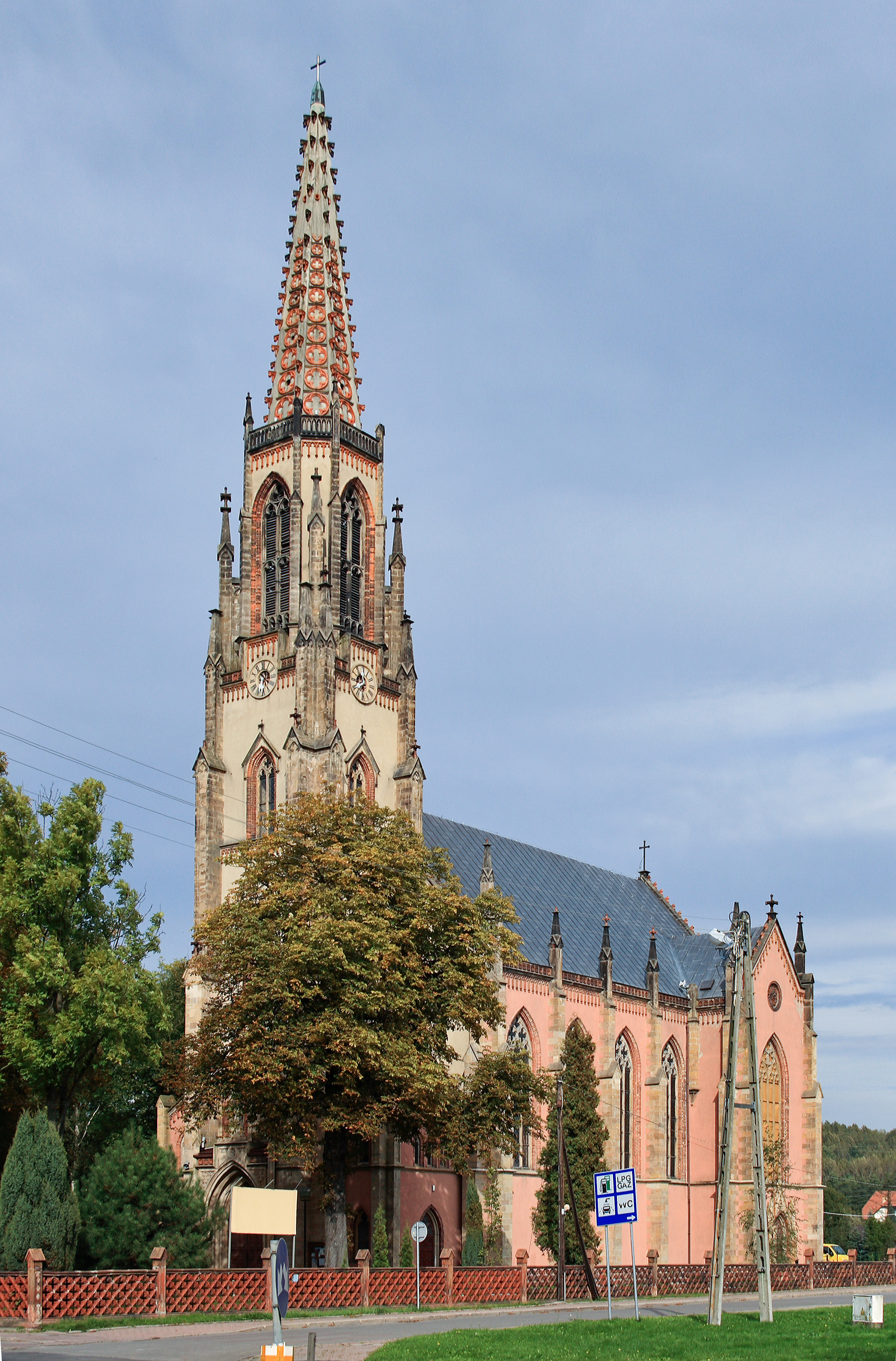
Immaculate Conception Church

See twin towns of Gmina Bogatynia.

== Notable residents ==
- Johann Hübner (1668–1731), German geographer and scholar
- Johann Gottfried Schicht, German composer (1753–1823)
- Ernst Friedrich Apelt, German philosopher (1812–1859)
- Gerhard Richter (born 1932), German artist
- Werner Dittrich (born 1937), German weightlifter
