= Bratków Zgorzelecki railway station =

Former railway station in Posada, south-western Poland

Bratków Zgorzelecki
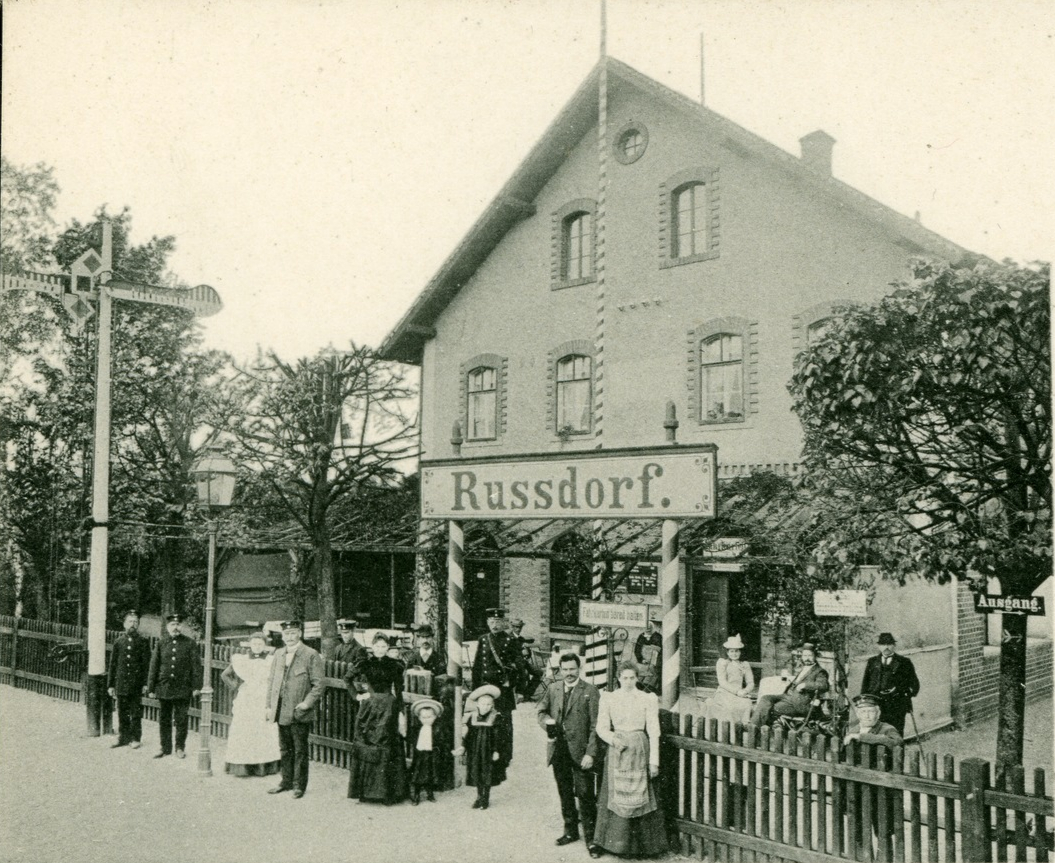
- Station building in 1898

General information
- Location: Posada, Lower Silesian Voivodeship; Poland
- Coordinates: 50°59′47.3″N 14°55′55.7″E
- Owner: Polskie Koleje Państwowe S.A.
- Lines: Mikułowa–Bogatynia railway (freight only); Krzewina railway
- Platforms: 1

History
- Opened: 15 October 1875
- Closed: 2 April 2000
Location
- Location within Poland Location within Lower Silesian Voivodeship

Bratków Zgorzelecki (German: Rusdorf) was a railway station near the village of Posada, Zgorzelec County, within the Lower Silesian Voivodeship in south-western Poland.

== History ==
The station opened on 15 October 1875 Rusdorf part of the Zittau–Hagenwerder railway. The station was renamed to Marienthal (Sachsen) in 1922. After World War II, the area came under Polish administration. As a result, the station was taken over by Polish State Railways and was renamed to Bratków Zgorzelecki.

Similar to its neighbouring stations; Krzewina Zgorzelecka and Trzciniec Zgorzelecki, the stations were not connected to any railway lines in Poland. So the station closed in 1945. The Mikułowa–Bogatynia railway opened to Turoszów in 1949. Services resumed under Polish State Railways in June 1969, with German trains still passing the station with their doors locked. The station mainly serves Ostritz in Germany, located on the western bank of the Lusatian Neisse. Bratków Zgorzelecki closed with the closure of the Mikułowa–Bogatynia railway on 3 April 2000.

== Former services ==
Preceding station	Disused railways	Following station
Turoszów towards Bogatynia	Polish State Railways; Mikułowa–Bogatynia	Krzewina Zgorzelecka towards Mikułowa
