= Krzewina railway =

Railway line in Poland

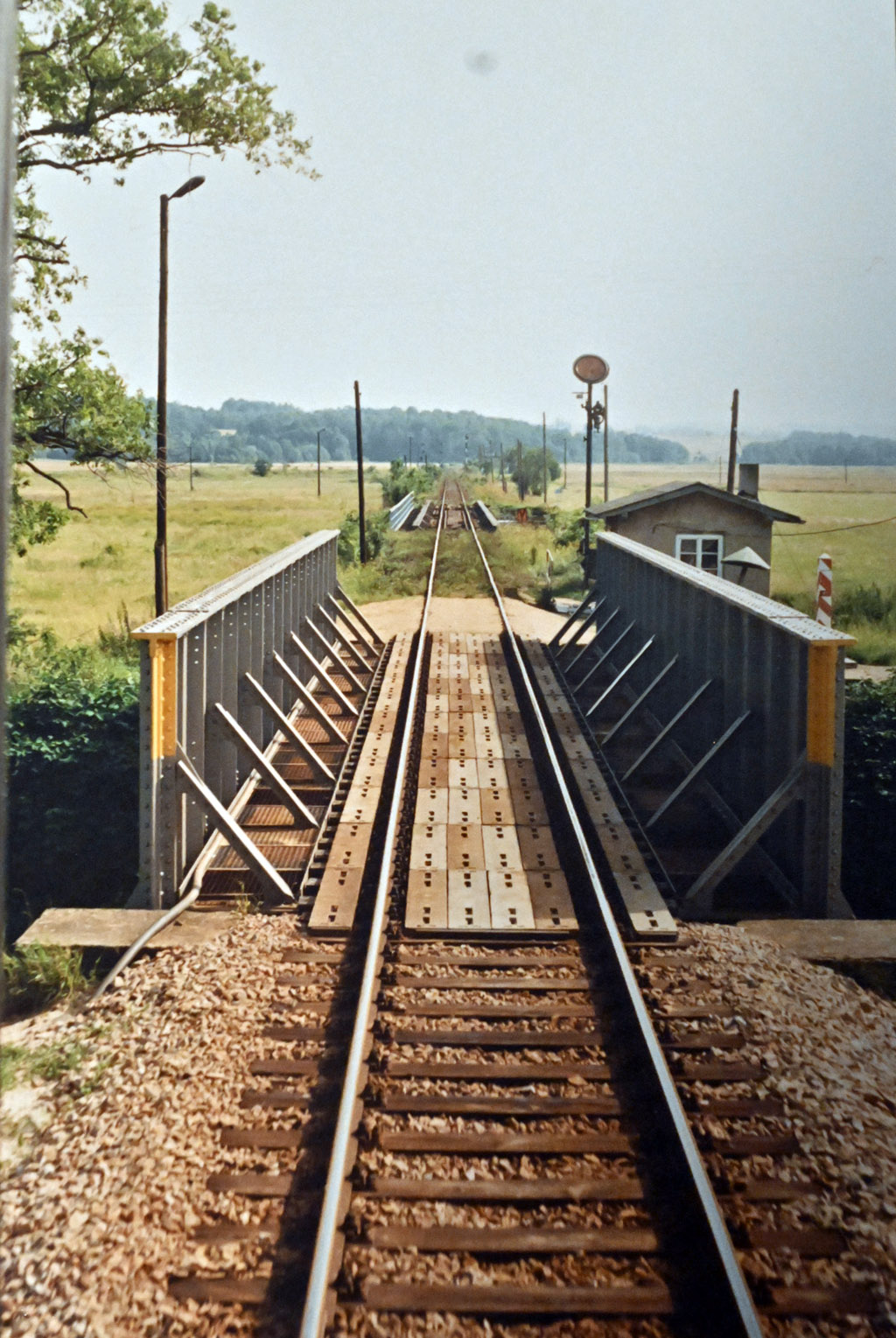
Railway bridge over the Lusatian Neisse in 1992

The Krzewina railway is the Polish section of the unelectrified, single-track German Zittau–Hagenwerder railway, also known as the Neisse Valley Railway (German: Neißetalbahn). The line's only operational station, Krzewina Zgorzelecka, is the only in Poland which is solely served by German trains, despite being owned and managed by Polish State Railways.

== Railway geography ==
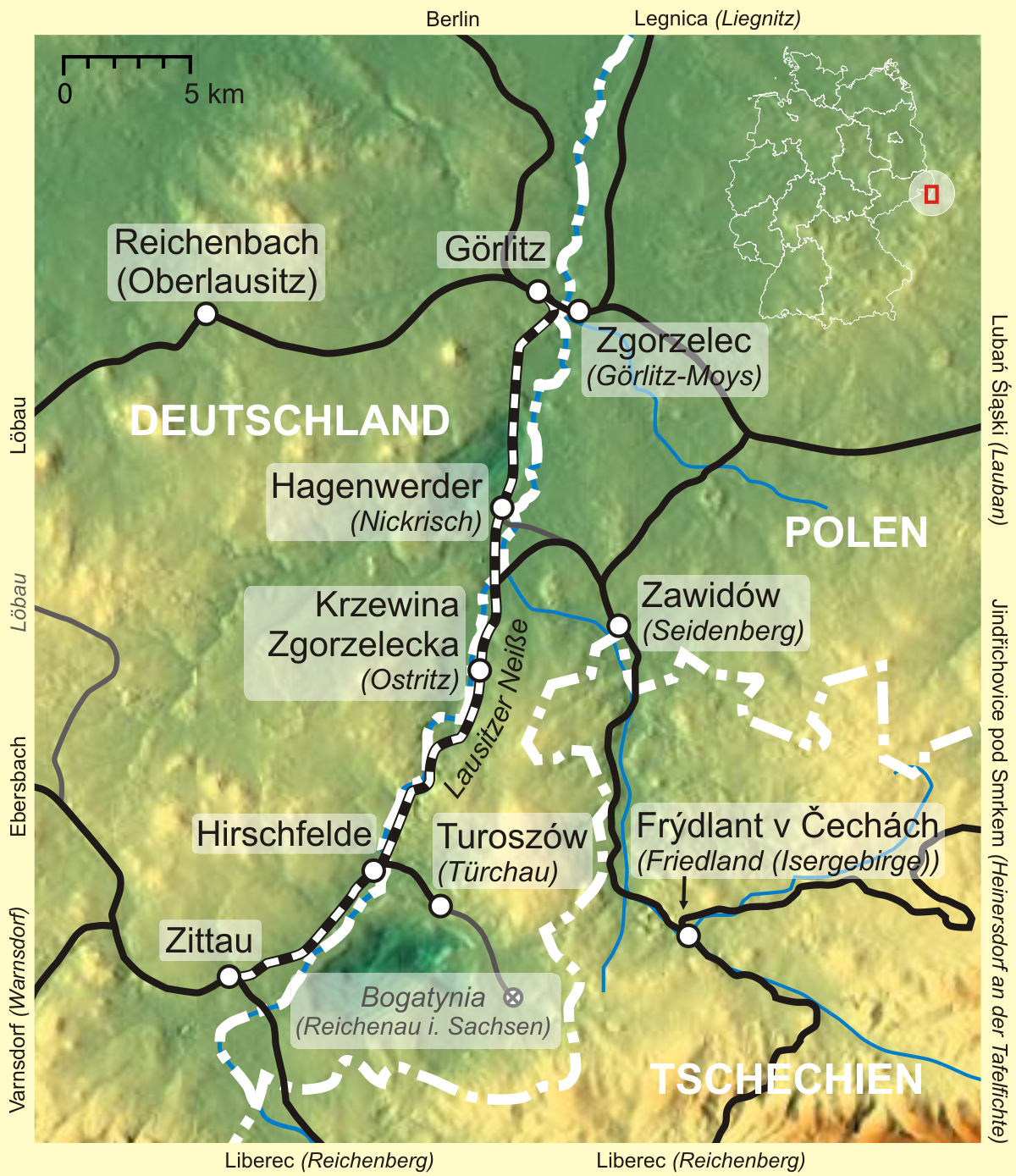
Map of the line shows Krzewina Zgorzelecka

The line is a section of the Zittau–Hagenwerder railway, which runs along the Lusatian Neisse. The Krzewina railway is differentiated as it is located in Poland, therefore managed and owned by Polish State Railways. The line is unique to Poland as it is only served by German Ostdeutsche Eisenbahn services. Only one of the two stations that lie on the line are currently operational; Krzewina Zgorzelecka. Bratków Zgorzelecki is a former station, which has been disused since the closure of the Mikułowa–Bogatynia railway in 2000.

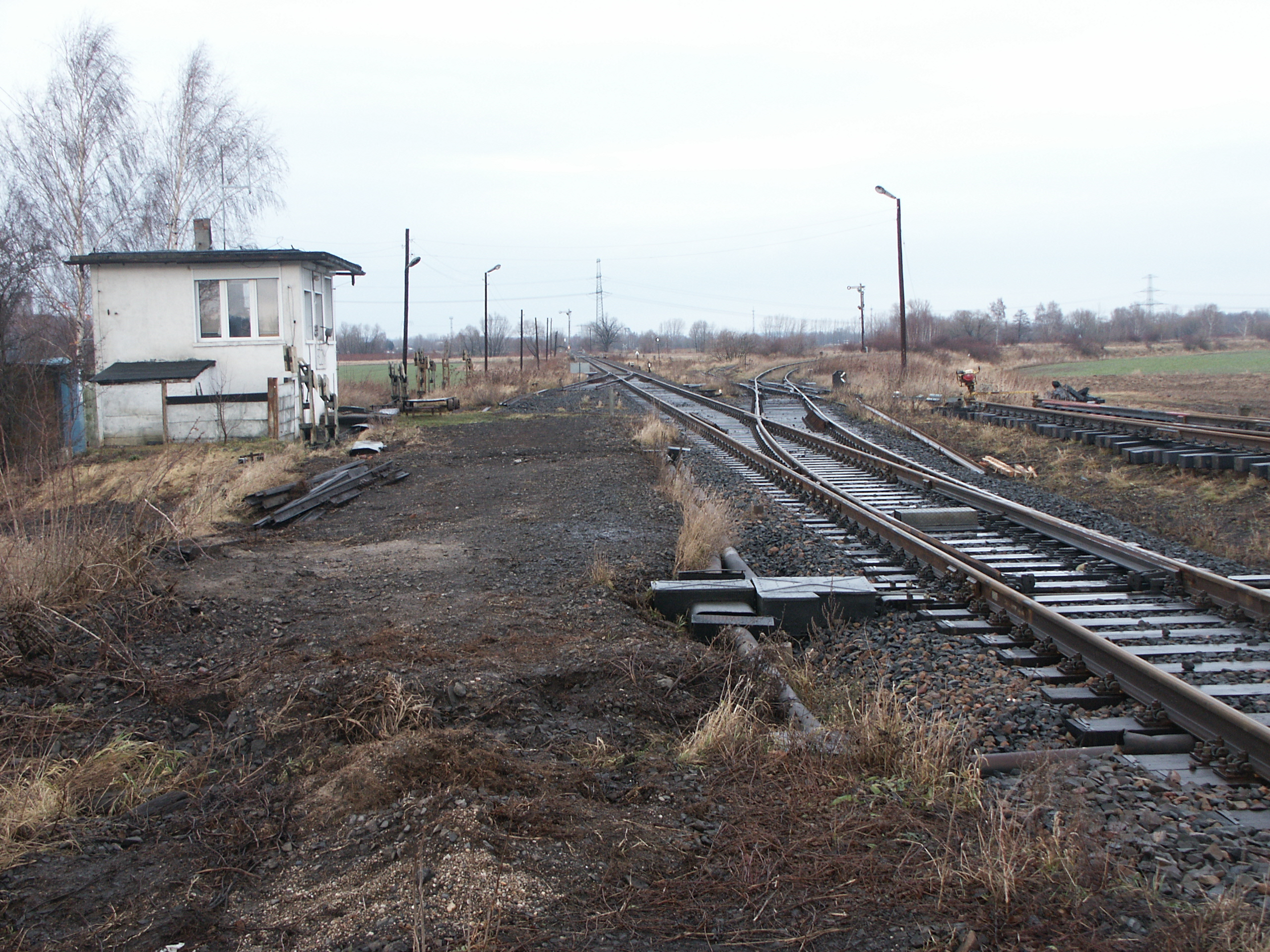
Ręczyn junction where the Krzewina railway (left) meets the Mikułowa–Bogatynia railway (right)

Krzewina Zgorzelecka lies closer to the German town of Ostritz (which is accessible via a footbridge over the Lusatian Neisse) than Krzewina itself, that most passengers alight the train for Ostritz. In fact, the station is sometimes referred to as Ostritz.

The Mikułowa–Bogatynia railway shares the part of the track of the Krzewina railway. In the northern end, it meets the line at a small junction in Ręczyn. It then branches off in the southern end near Trzciniec, towards Bogatynia.

== History ==
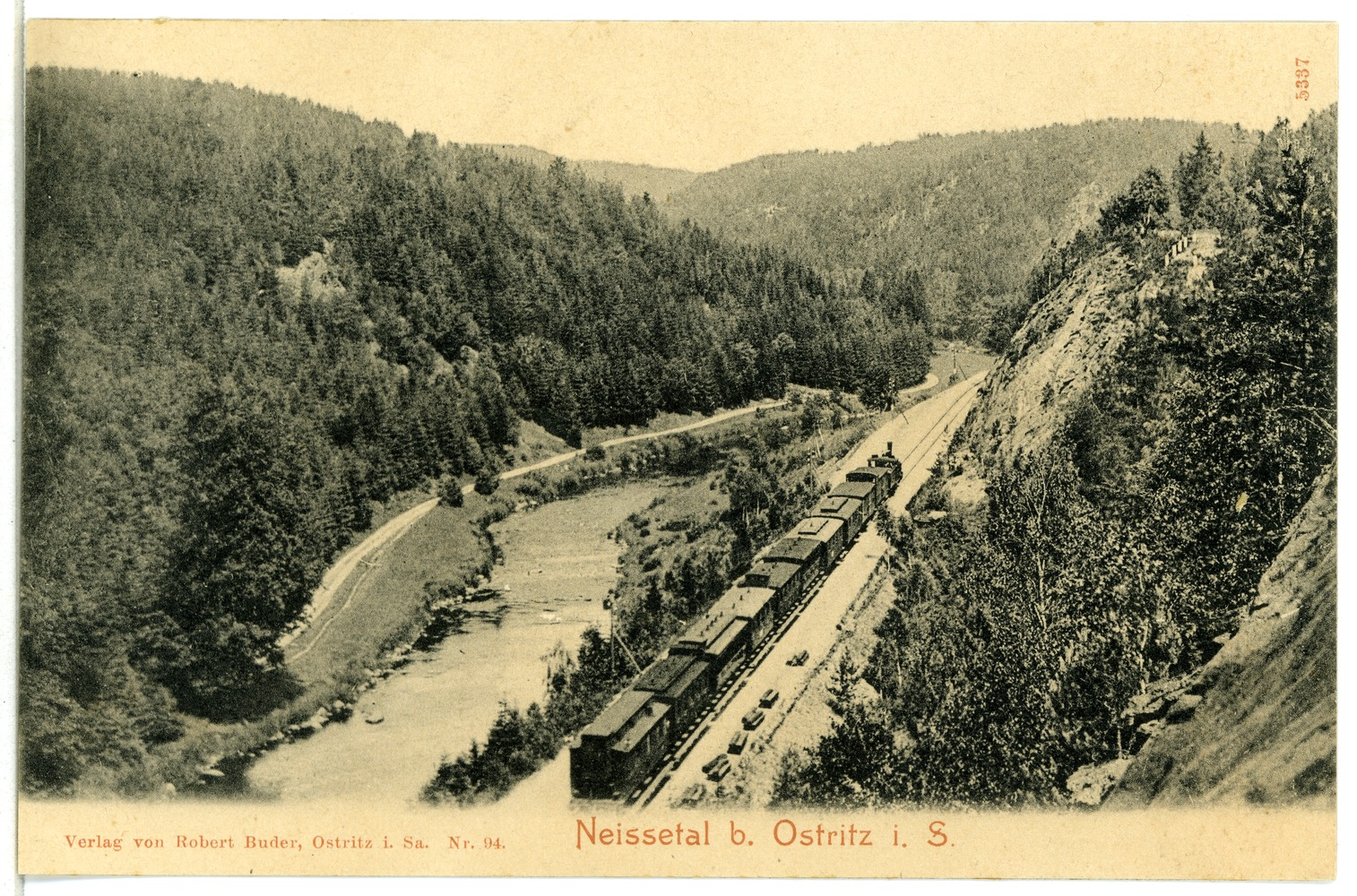
Railway near Krzewina in 1904

The first part of the Zittau–Hagenwerder railway opened on 15 October 1875. At the time, the whole line was located in Germany. On the same day with the opening of the line, Krzewina Zgorzelecka and Bratków Zgorzelecki railway stations opened, originally as Ostritz and Rusdorf.

After World War II, the area east of the Oder–Neisse line became part of Poland. The two stations on the line that became part of Poland closed as they weren't connected to any railway lines in Poland. The line remained open, but passing German trains must have had their doors locked to prevent illegal border crossings into Poland.

In 1957, the Mikułowa–Bogatynia railway was opened by Polish State Railways. As it shared most of the tracks of the Krzewina railway, passenger services began calling at Krzewina Zgorzelecka and Bratków Zgorzelecki once again. Prior to this, Trzciniec Zgorzelecki closed in 1950 and was demolished the following year.

On 6 November 1959, German train services were now able to call at Krzewina Zgorzelecka, under a new agreement between the Polish and German governments. Alighting passengers were escorted to Ostritz by armed Polish Border Protection Forces to prevent illegal border crossings into Poland. These restrictions were eased in a local agreement in 1993, and border controls were fully abolished in 2007 with Poland's accession to the Schengen Area.

In 2000, passenger services on the Mikułowa–Bogatynia railway were withdrawn. This closure made the Krzewina railway the only railway line in Poland to be solely served by German trains. Currently, the Mikułowa–Bogatynia railway is only used by freight trains. In 2025, there were plans for passenger services to return to the Mikułowa–Bogatynia railway, part of the Kolej Plus programme. This would have also included Krzewina Zgorzelecka and Bratków Zgorzelecki. These plans were later dropped.

== Train services ==
The line is the only in Poland to solely be served by German trains, operated by Ostdeutsche Eisenbahn.

The station is served by the following services:

- Regional services (RB) Cottbus - Görlitz - Zittau
