= Sulików railway station =

Former railway station in Sulików, Poland

Sulików
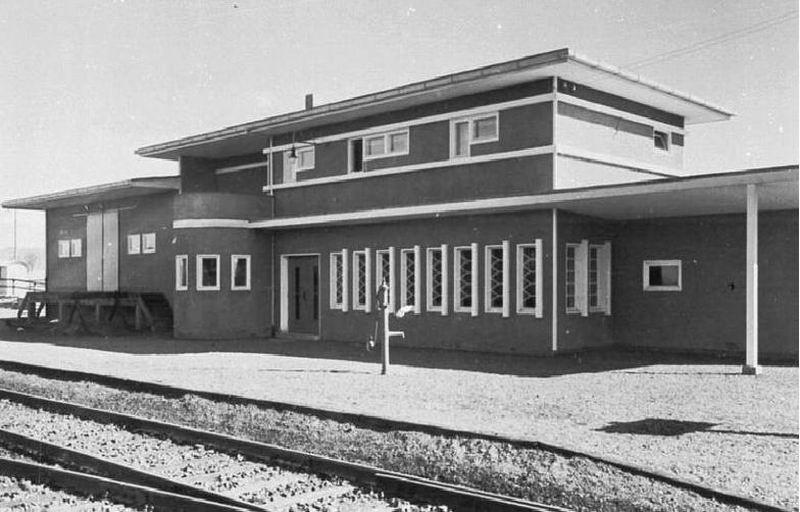
- Station building in 1927

General information
- Location: Sulików, Lower Silesian Voivodeship; Poland
- Owner: Polskie Koleje Państwowe S.A.
- Lines: Mikułowa–Bogatynia railway (freight only); Krzewina railway
- Platforms: 2

Construction
- Architect: Adolf Rading
- Architectural style: Modern

History
- Opened: 29 October 1927
- Closed: 2 April 2000
- Former names: Schönberg (Oberlausitz) (before 1945); Jasna Hora (1945–1947)
Location
- Location within Poland Location within Lower Silesian Voivodeship

Sulików (German: Schönberg) was a railway station on the Mikułowa–Bogatynia railway in the village of Sulików, Zgorzelec County, within the Lower Silesian Voivodeship in south-western Poland.

Sulików has four tracks, with an additional two sidings branching off into a basalt mine. Currently, it is used by freight trains for loading and unloading.

== History ==
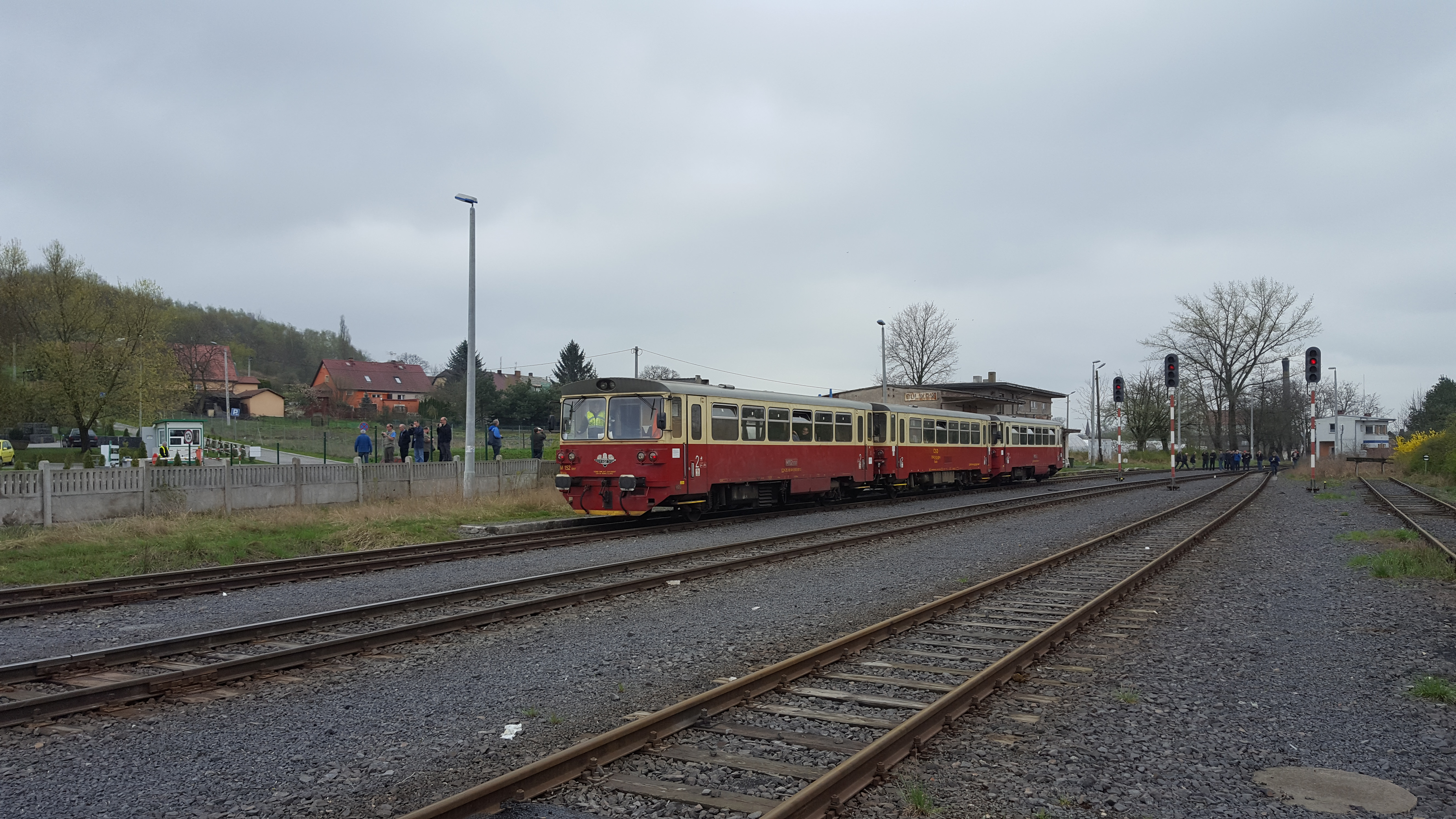
Tourist train at the station in 2017

The station opened as Schönberg (Oberlausitz) on 29 October 1927. A locomotive shed operated at the station. The station building's architectural style follows modern architecture, designed by Adolf Rading. The locomotive shed was demolished during the station's modernisations in 1937.

After World War II, the area came under Polish administration. As a result, the station was taken over by Polish State Railways, and was renamed to Jasna Hora. It was renamed to its modern name, Sulików, in 1947.

Passenger services were withdrawn from Sulików on 2 April 2000. Since then, it has only been used by freight trains.

== Former services ==
Preceding station	Disused railways	Following station
Krzewina Zgorzelecka towards Bogatynia	Polish State Railways; Mikułowa–Bogatynia	Mikułowa; Terminus
