= Shield and Sword (festival) =

Annual neo-Nazi music festival in Germany

Shield and Sword Schild und Schwert
- Genre: Neo-Nazi rock music
- Dates: April 20–21, 2018, November 2–3, 2018, and June 21–23, 2019
- Venue: Hotel Neißeblick
- Location: Ostritz (Germany)
- Years active: 2018–19
- Attendance: 700–1300
- Organiser: Thorsten Heise

Schild und Schwert (Shield and Sword) is a Neo-Nazi rock music festival held in Germany to celebrate the birthday of Adolf Hitler. The festival is organized by the ultra-nationalist political group the National Democratic Party (NPD). The event is held in Ostritz in Eastern Saxony. The festival is attended by far-right extremists from Germany and neighboring countries.

The Federal Office for the Protection of the Constitution (Bundesverfassungsschutz) mentioned that "the festival has particular importance for the sub-cultural right-wing extremist scene". In 2018, the Neo-fascist mixed martial arts scene and the music scene were united for the first time at the festival by the MMA event "Kampf der Nibelungen".

== 2018 ==
In 2018 NPD activist Thorsten Heise and NPD lawyer Peter Richter organized Shield and Sword. They combined it with the Nazi MMA event, "Kampf der Nibelungen". The music line-up included white metal bands such as Die Lunikoff-Verschwörung, which was founded by the former Landser singer Michael Regener, Kategorie C, Amok from Switzerland, Oidoxie from Dortmund, and others. Nearly every band has a connection to Blood & Honour.

== 2019 ==
In 2019 the festival had 500 to 600 attendees. 1,400 police officers from several states from Germany and from Poland were there. The city of Ostritz prohibited any alcohol at the festival.

== 2020 ==
In 2020 the festival was postponed and then cancelled because of the COVID-19 pandemic.
