= Krzewina Zgorzelecka railway station =

Railway station in Zgorzelec County, Poland

Krzewina Zgorzelecka Ostritz
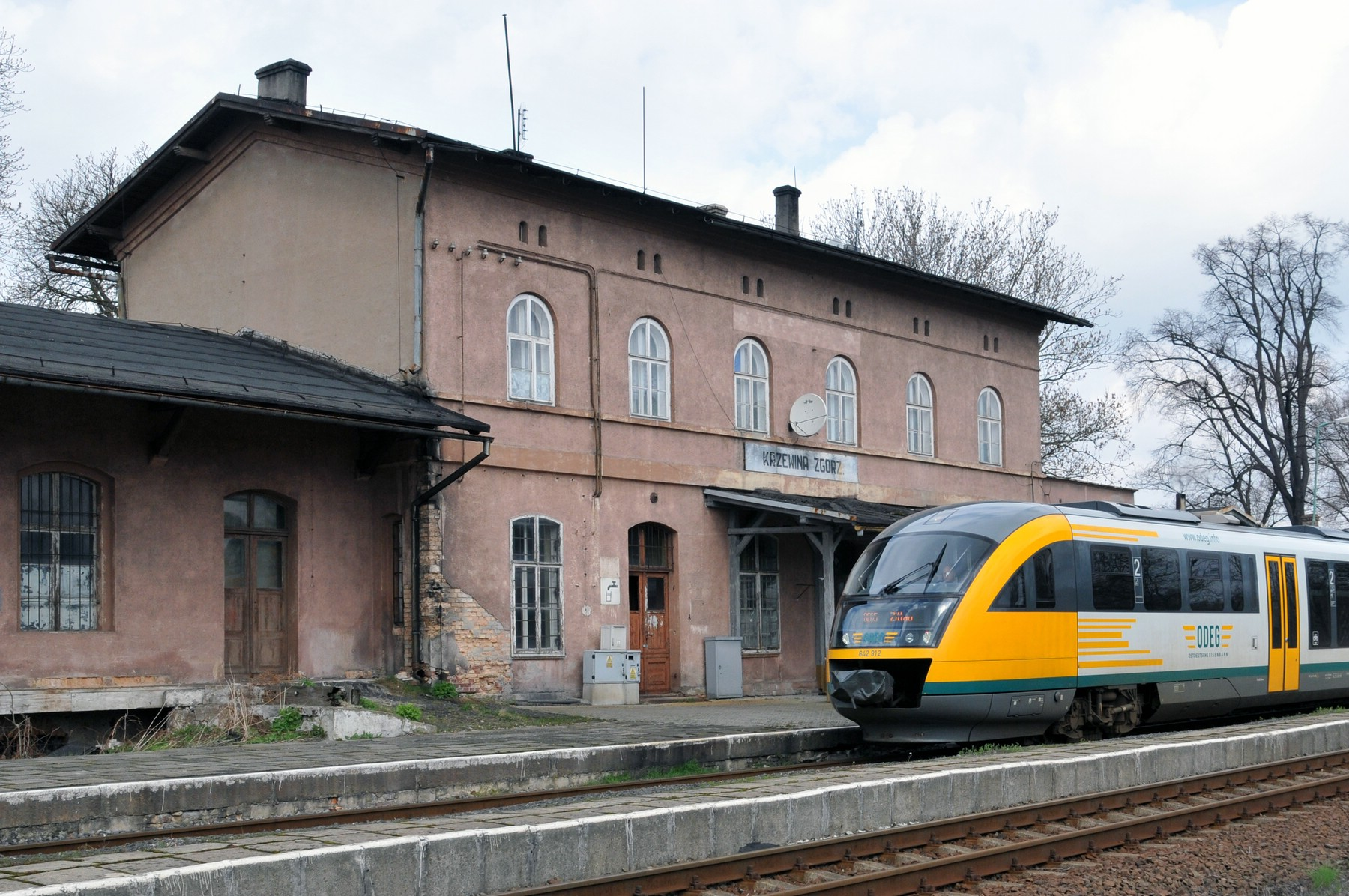
- Ostdeutsche Eisenbahn service bound for Zittau

General information
- Other names: Ostritz, Krzewina
- Location: Krzewina, Lower Silesian Voivodeship; Poland
- Coordinates: 51°00′56.5″N 14°56′23.0″E
- Owner: Polskie Koleje Państwowe S.A.
- Lines: Mikułowa–Bogatynia railway (freight only); Krzewina railway
- Platforms: 2

History
- Opened: 15 October 1875

Services
Preceding station	Ostdeutsche Eisenbahn	Following station
Hagenwerder towards Cottbus Hbf	RB 65	Hirschfelde towards Zittau
Location
- Location within Poland Location within Lower Silesian Voivodeship

Krzewina Zgorzelecka, also Ostritz or simply Krzewina is a railway station near the village of Krzewina, Zgorzelec County, within the Lower Silesian Voivodeship in south-western Poland. The station mainly serves Ostritz in Germany, located on the western bank of the Lusatian Neisse.

== Station ==
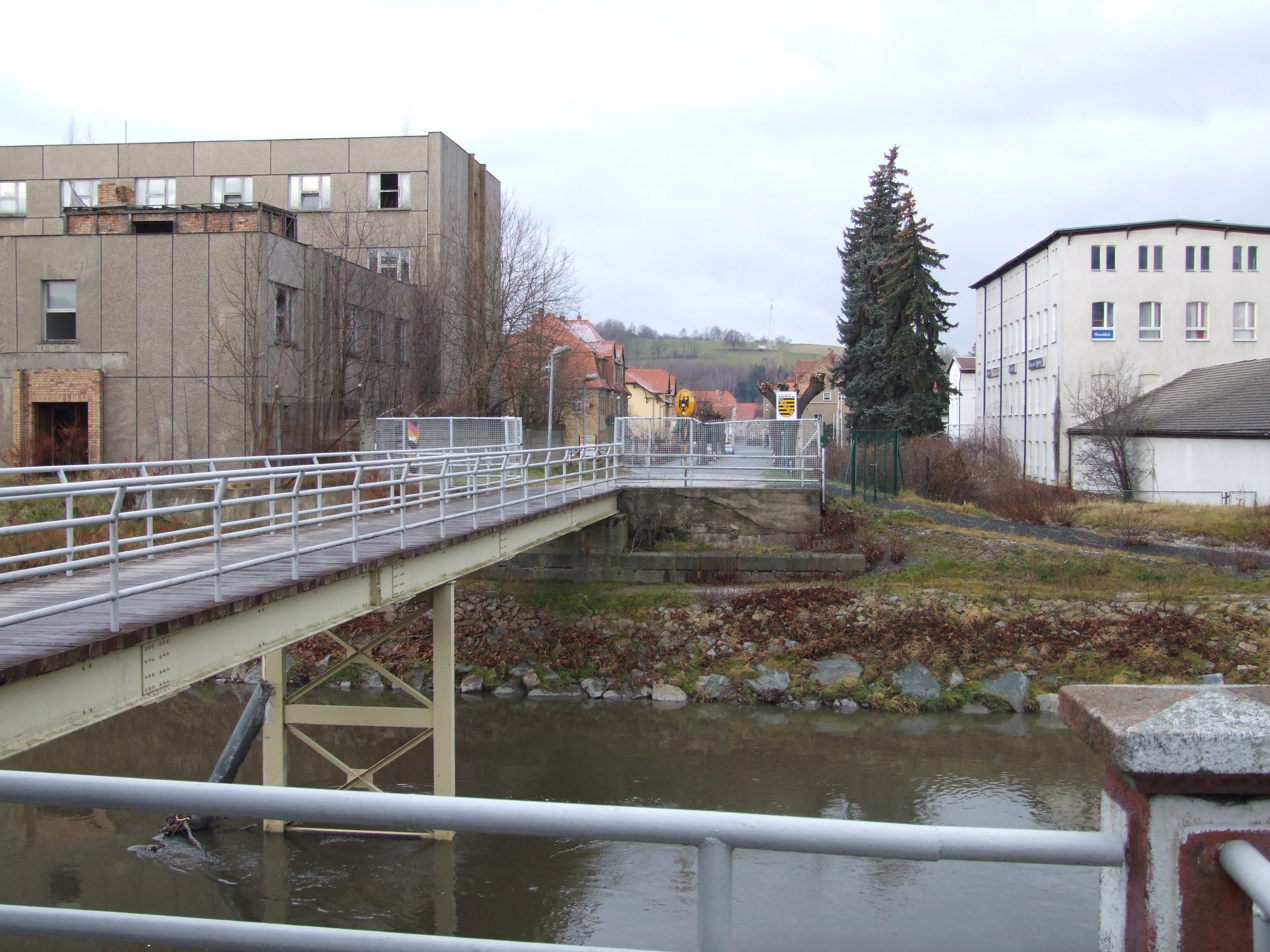
Pedestrian bridge connecting Ostritz with the station

Despite the station being in Poland, it is not served by Polish State Railways, and is instead served by German RB 65 Ostdeutsche Eisenbahn services, making the station the only station in Poland which is solely served by German trains. Most passengers using this station alight for Ostritz, the German town which can be entered via a footbridge over the Lusatian Neisse. The station is closer to Ostritz than Krzewina itself.

PKP Cargo trains occasionally pass through the station via the Mikułowa–Bogatynia railway.

== History ==
The station opened as Ostritz on 15 October 1875 when both sides of the Lusatian Neisse were part of Germany. After World War II, the area east of the Oder–Neisse line became part of Poland. Because the station was not connected to any railway lines in Poland, it closed. German trains would still use the line, however when passing through the section on Polish territory, the train doors were locked to prevent illegal border crossings into Poland.

In 1957, the Mikułowa–Bogatynia railway was opened by Polish State Railways (PKP). As a result, the station reopened as Krzewina Zgorzelecka, named after the nearby village of Krzewina, with now regular passenger trains within Poland.

On 6 November 1959, German train services were now able to call at the station, under a new agreement between the Polish and German governments. Alighting passengers were escorted to Ostritz by armed Polish Border Protection Forces to prevent illegal border crossings into Poland.

In 1993, a local border traffic agreement eased the restrictions for those entering Ostritz, and in 2007, Poland's accession to the Schengen Area allowed for the full abolition of border controls entering Ostritz.

In 2000, passenger services were withdrawn from the Mikułowa–Bogatynia railway, closing the line for only freight trains. PKP Cargo trains occasionally pass through the station via the Mikułowa–Bogatynia railway. Since the 2000 closure, the station has been solely operated by German trains.

In 2026, PKP proposed the reconstruction of the Mikułowa–Bogatynia railway, which would lead to the re-opening of the line to Bogatynia, and Krzewina Zgorzelecka being no longer solely served by German trains. PKP is proposing for the line to be taken over by the Lower Silesian Voivodeship, who would also fund the majority of the reconstruction, which is estimated at around 200 million Polish złoty. The line would be operated by local operator, Lower Silesian Railways. The proposal is underway and has not yet been approved. If the proposal was to be approved, the estimated re-opening date of the line would be between 2029–2030.

== Train services ==
The station is not served by Polish State Railways, and instead only by German Ostdeutsche Eisenbahn services.

The station is served by the following services:

- Regional services (RB) Cottbus - Görlitz - Zittau

=== Former ===
Preceding station	Disused railways	Following station
Bratków Zgorzelecki towards Bogatynia	Polish State Railways; Mikułowa–Bogatynia	Sulików towards Mikułowa
