= St. Marienthal Abbey =

- Kloster St. Marienthal
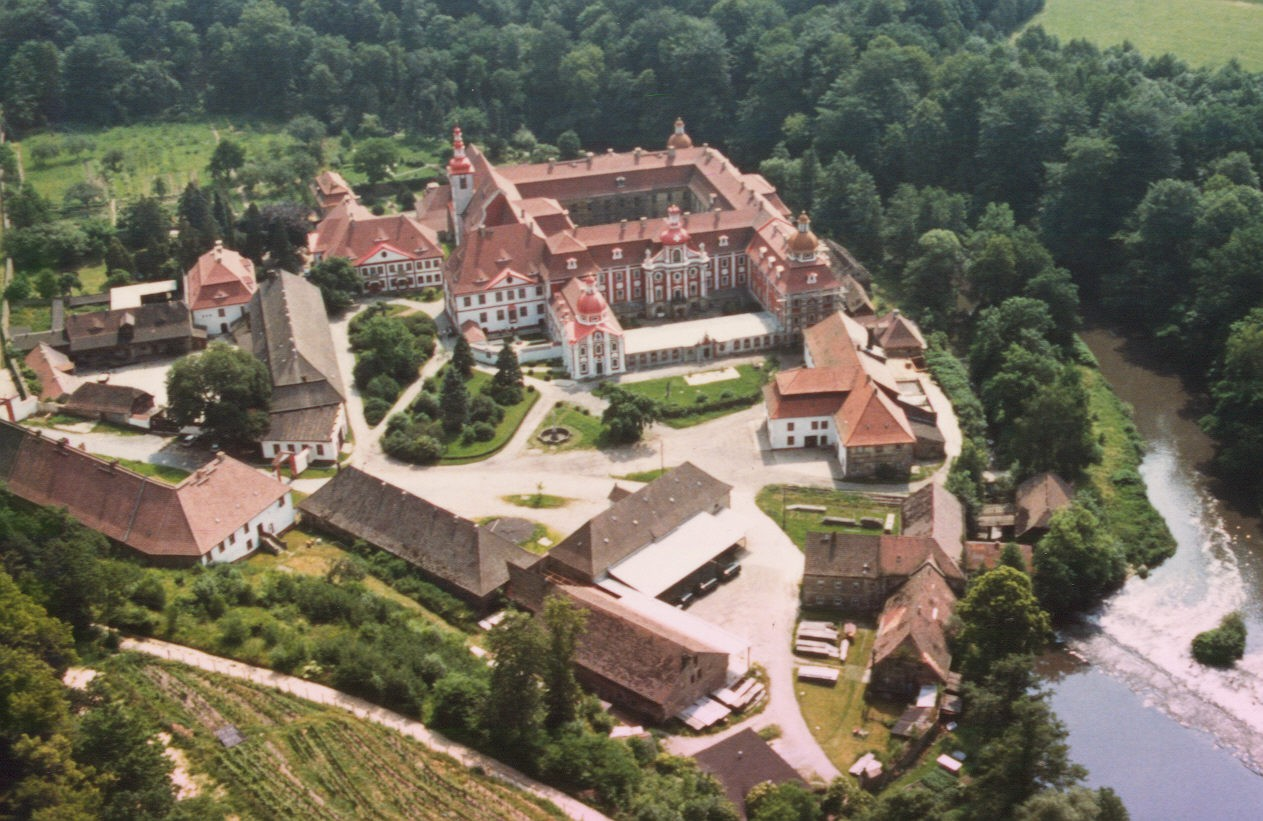
- St. Marienthal Abbey from the northwest
- Interactive map of St. Marienthal Abbey

Monastery information
- Full name: Zisterzienserinnenabtei Klosterstift St. Marienthal
- Order: Cistercian
- Established: 1234
- Dedication: Assumption of the Blessed Virgin Mary
- Diocese: Roman Catholic Diocese of Dresden-Meissen

People
- Founder: Kunigunde, Queen Consort of Bohemia
- Abbot: Äbtissin Schwester M. Regina Wollmann OCist (Abbess Sister M. Regina Wollmann, Cistercian Order)
- Prior: Schwester M. Elisabeth Vaterodt OCist (Sister M. Elisabeth Vaterodt, Cistercian Order)

Site
- Location: Ostritz, Saxony, Germany
- Coordinates: 50.997971°N 14.924648°E
- Public access: yes
- Website: www.kloster-marienthal.de

St. Marienthal Abbey (German: Kloster St. Marienthal; Upper Sorbian: Abtei St. Marijiny doł) is a Cistercian nunnery in Saxon Upper Lusatia. The abbey is the oldest nunnery of the Cistercian Order in Germany to have maintained unbroken occupation of its house since its foundation.

St. Marienthal is located to the south of Ostritz on the left bank of the Neisse, which at this point forms today's German border with Poland. To the north, Görlitz is about 20 kilometres away.

== History ==
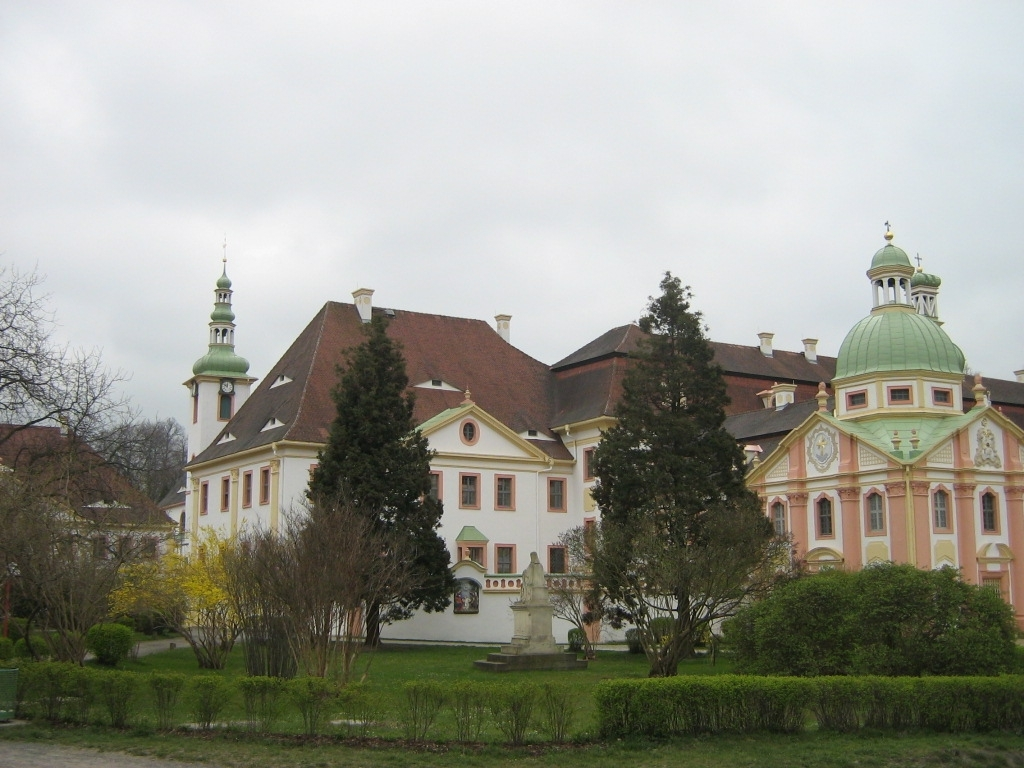
Church and abbey

The abbey was founded in 1234 by Kunigunde of Hohenstaufen, daughter of Philip of Swabia and wife of Wenceslas I of Bohemia, near a trade route that ran from Prague to Görlitz via Zittau. As early as 1235 the new foundation was incorporated into the Cistercian Order, with the abbot of Altzella acting as visitor. The first documented abbess of St. Marienthal Abbey was the noblewoman Adelheid I. von Dohna (Donyn), daughter of Burgrave Otto von Dohna (Donyn).

The abbey was destroyed during the Hussite Wars in 1427, and not rebuilt until 1452. It was damaged by fire in 1515, 1542 and (particularly seriously) in 1683. Rebuilding in the Baroque style began in 1685. The Baroque church interior suffered extensive damage in a flood of the Neisse in 1897.

During World War II the buildings were used as a military hospital. In 1945 the retreating German forces wanted to blow up the abbey to hinder the advance of the Russians, but the nuns refused to leave, and the building was spared.

The abbey survived the Communist East German régime and after 1989 spent large sums on restoration and developing the facilities. In August 2010 however another flood of the Neisse caused catastrophic damage.

== Bibliography ==
- Dannenberg, Lars-Arne (2008): Das Kloster St. Marienthal und die Burggrafen von Dohna. in: Neues Lausitzisches Magazin 11 (2008), pp. 89–104
- Schlesinger, Walter (ed.) (1965): Handbuch der historischen Stätten: Sachsen. Stuttgart
- Schmacht, Josefine (2004): Die Zisterzienserinnen-Abtei St. Marienthal von 1800 bis 2000 im Spiegel ihrer Äbtissinnen. StadtBILD-Verlag: Görlitz
- Schönfelder, J.B. (1834): Urkundliche Geschichte des Königlichen Jungfrauenstifts und Klosters St. Marienthal in der Königlich-Sächsischen Oberlausitz. Zittau
- Zdichynec, Jan (2003): Klášter Marienthal mezi králi, městy a šlechtou (1234–1547). In: Bobková, Lenka (ed.): Korunní země v dějinách českého státu, vol. 1: Integrační a partikulární rysy českého státu v pozdním středověku, pp. 166–218. Prague
