= Turoszów railway station =

Former railway station in Turoszów, south-western Poland

Turoszów
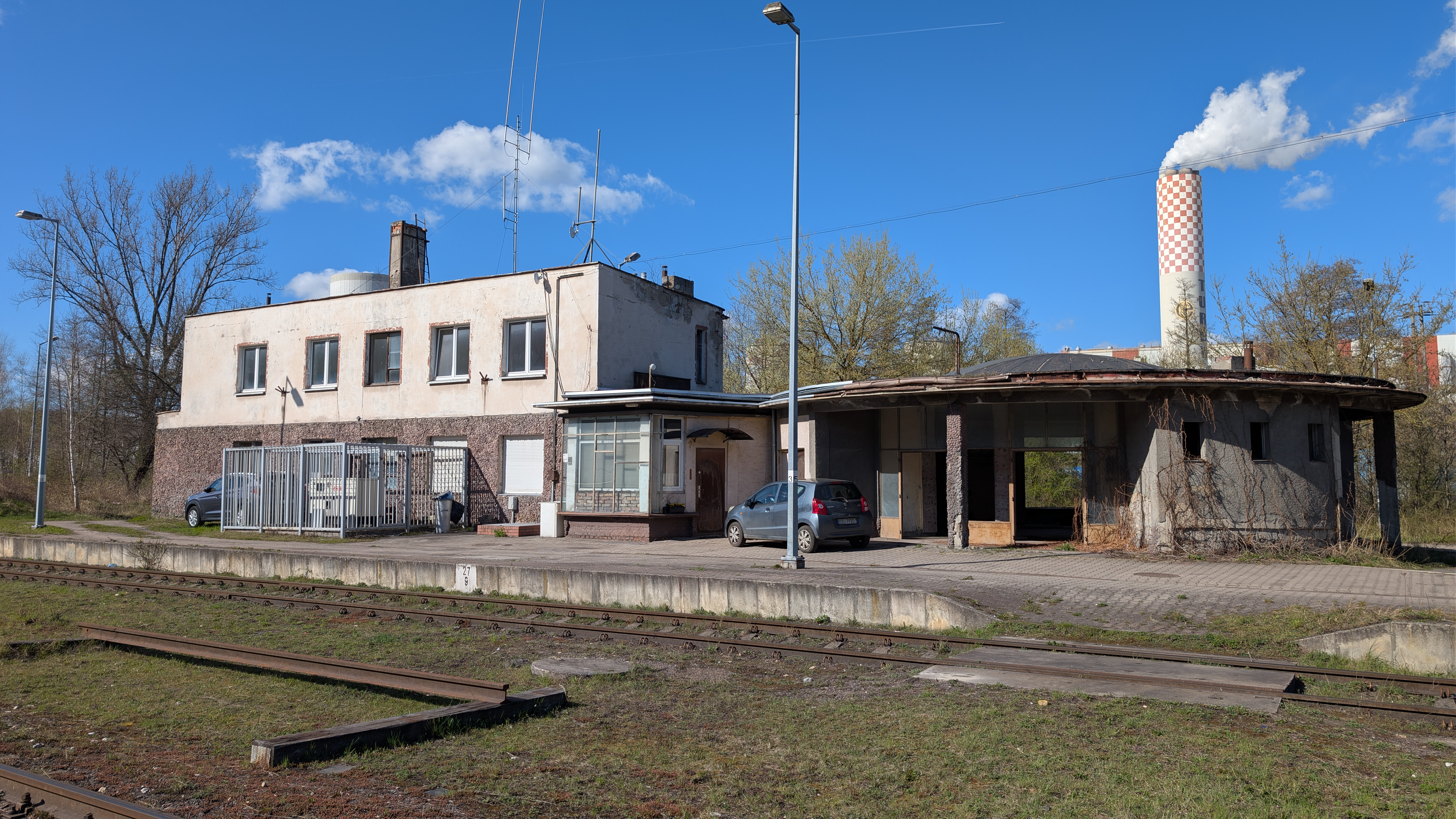
- Station building in 2026

General information
- Location: Turoszów, Bogatynia, Lower Silesian Voivodeship; Poland
- Coordinates: 50°56′35.0″N 14°54′39.0″E
- Owner: Polish State Railways
- Line: Mikułowa–Bogatynia railway
- Platforms: 1

History
- Opened: 15 May 1949
- Closed: 2 April 2000
- Former names: Turów (1949–1950)
Location
- Location within Poland Location within Lower Silesian Voivodeship

Turoszów is an abandoned railway station on the Mikułowa–Bogatynia railway in the Turoszów district of Bogatynia, Zgorzelec County, within the Lower Silesian Voivodeship in south-western Poland.

Passenger services were withdrawn from the station on 2 April 2000. Currently, only freight trains stop at and pass the station.

== History ==
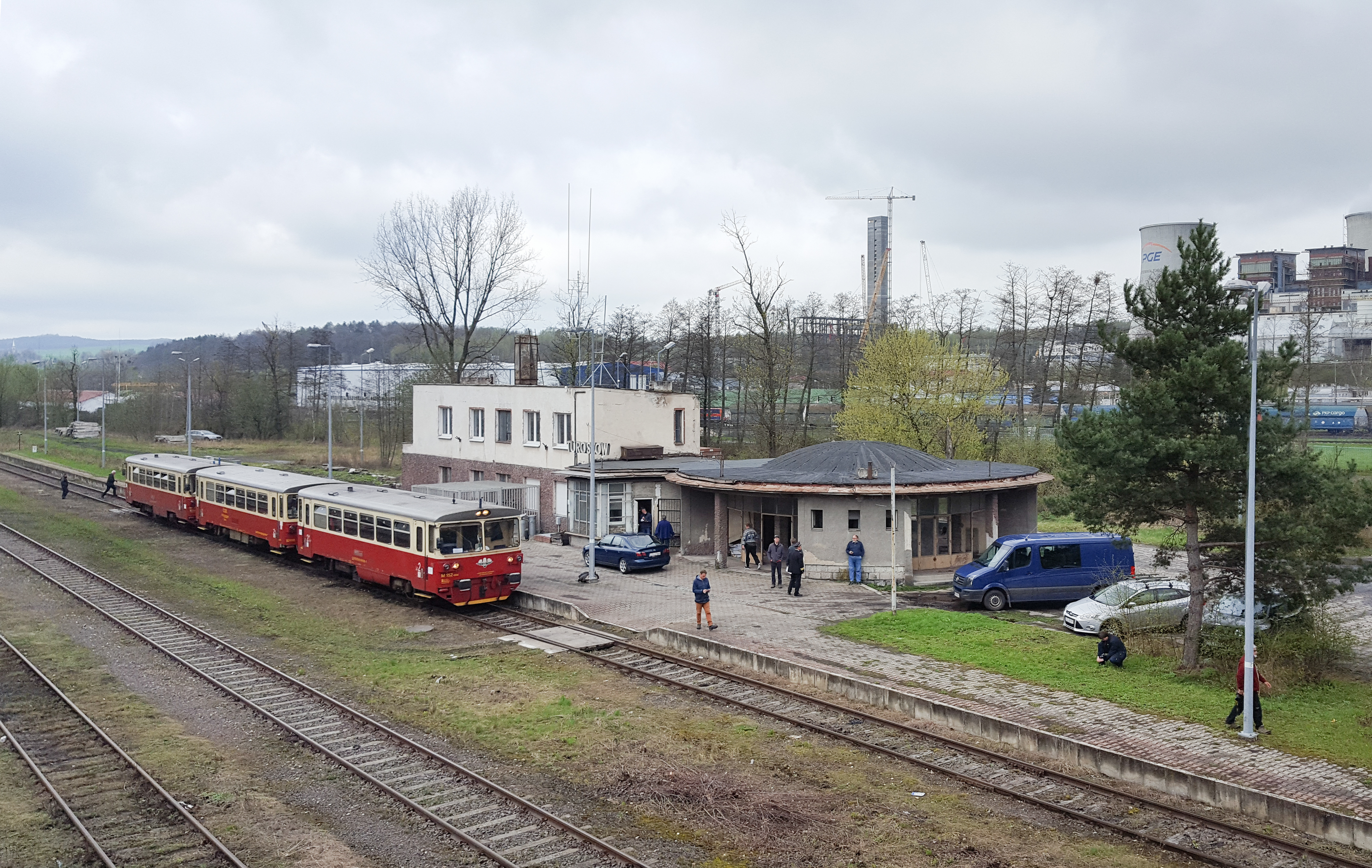
Tourist train at the station in 2017

The station opened as Turów on 15 May 1949. The following year it was renamed to its modern name, Turoszów.

In 2026, Polish State Railways (PKP) proposed the reconstruction of the station and Mikułowa–Bogatynia railway, which would lead to the re-opening of the line. PKP is proposing for the line to be taken over by the Lower Silesian Voivodeship, who would also fund the majority of the reconstruction, which is estimated at around 200 million Polish złoty. The line would be operated by local operator, Lower Silesian Railways. The proposal is underway and has not yet been approved. If the proposal was to be approved, the estimated re-opening date of the line would be between 2029–2030.

== Former services ==
Preceding station	Disused railways	Following station
Turoszów Kopalnia towards Bogatynia	Polish State Railways; Mikułowa–Bogatynia	Bratków Zgorzelecki towards Mikułowa
