= Trzciniec, Bogatynia =

District of Bogatynia, Poland

Trzciniec
- District of Bogatynia
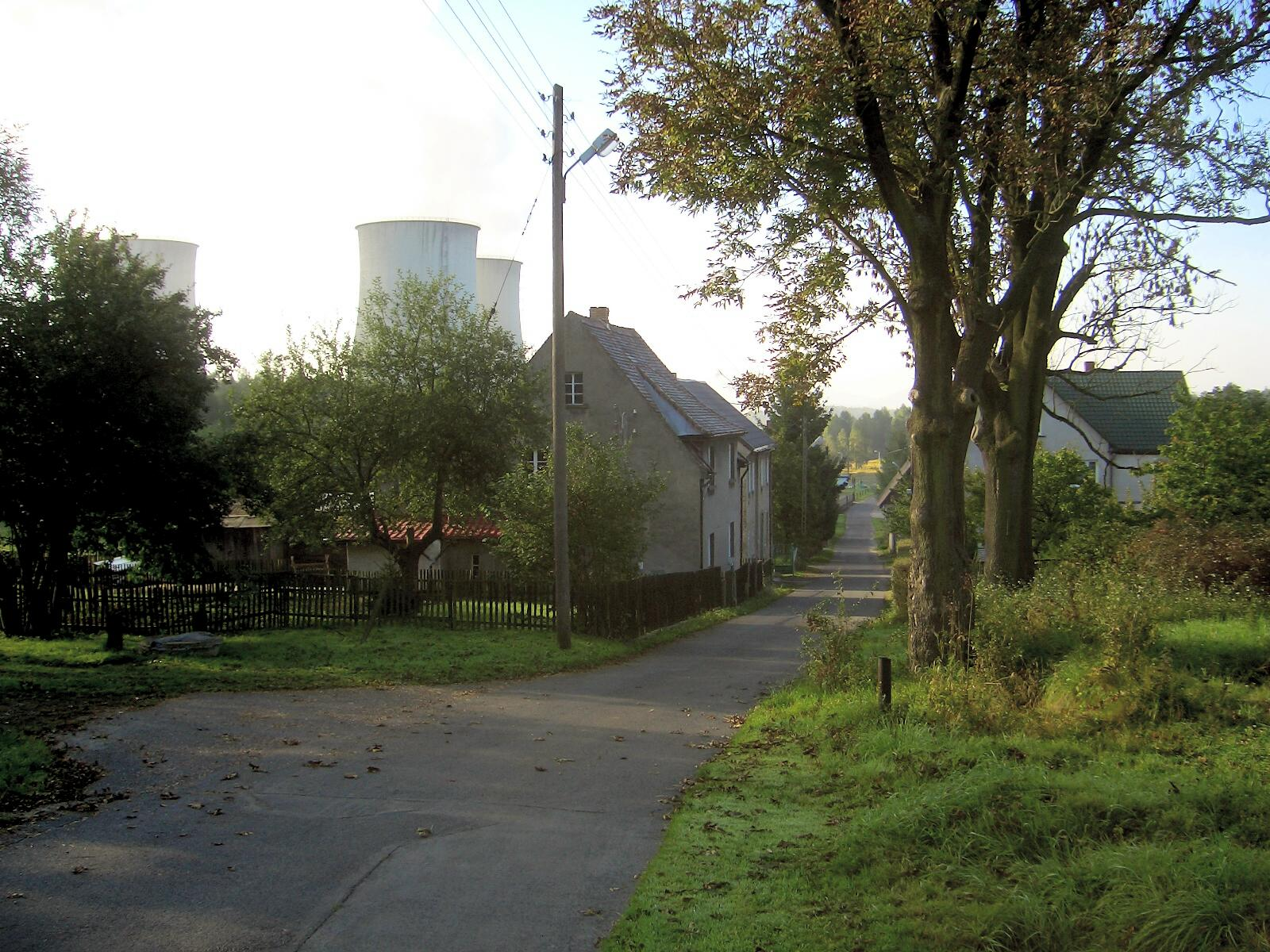
- Houses in Trzciniec, with Turów Power Station in the background

- Location within Poland Location within Lower Silesian Voivodeship
- Coordinates: 50°57′19.0″N 14°54′09.0″E
- Country: Poland
- Voivodeship: Lower Silesian
- County: Zgorzelec
- Town: Bogatynia
- Within town limits: 1973
- Time zone: UTC+1 (CET)
  - Summer (DST): UTC+2 (CEST)
- Area code: +48 75
- Vehicle registration: DZG

Trzciniec (German: Rohnau) is a district in the town of Bogatynia, Zgorzelec County, in the Lower Silesian Voivodeship in western Poland.

== History ==
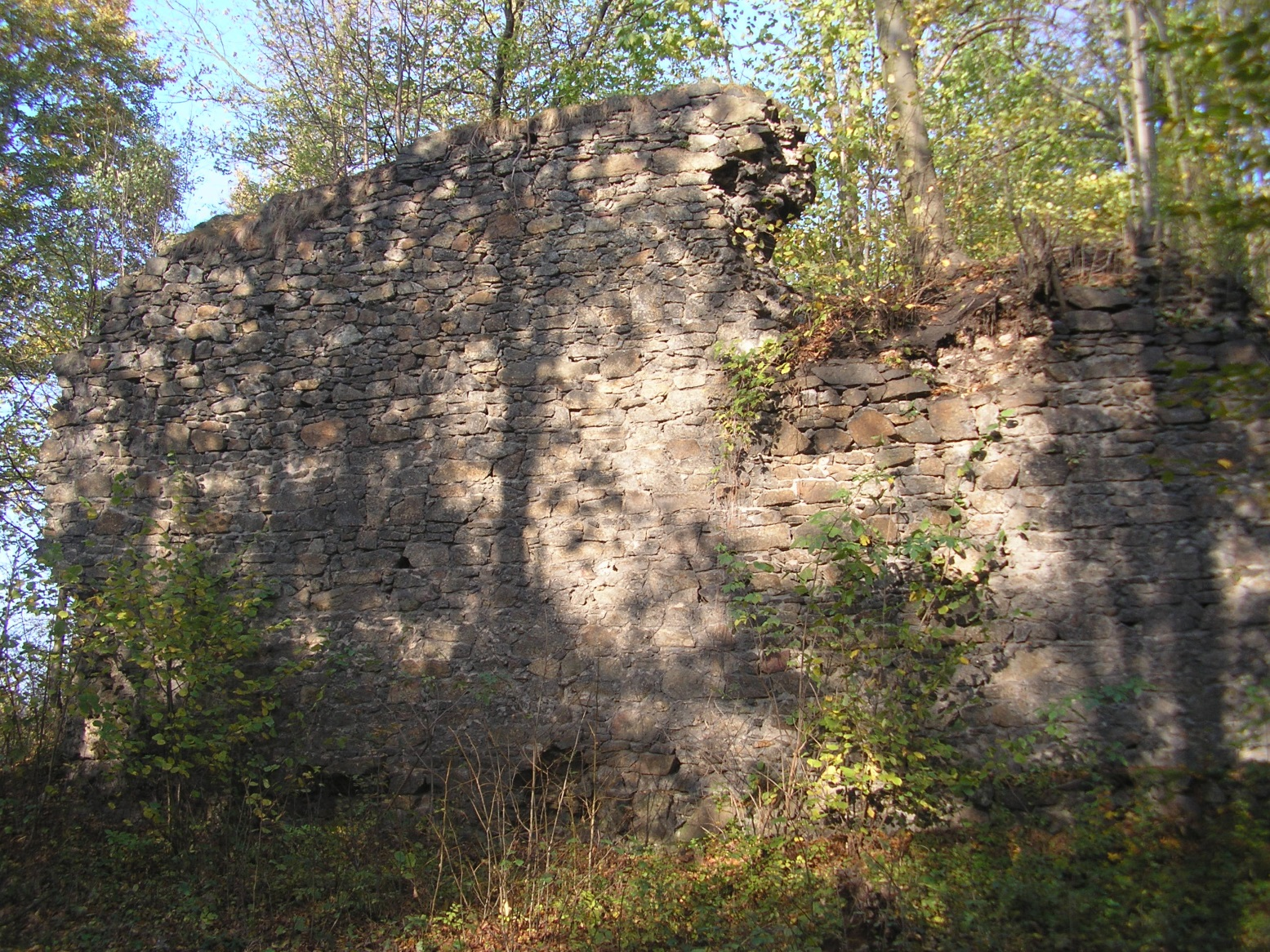
Ruins of Ronow castle

Trzciniec was first mentioned in 1262 when Ronow castle was built in the 13th century. In 1319, the village was taken over by John of Bohemia, who in the same year handed it over to Henry I of Jawor, making Trzciniec part of the Duchy of Jawor. Trzciniec became part of the Kingdom of Bohemia once again in 1346. In 1389 it became a private Szlachta (noble) village.

The gothic castle was destroyed by the Lusatian League in 1399. Between 1494 and 1547, and once again in 1554, Trzciniec (Rohnau) was an area of Zittau. In the second half of the 19th century, Carl August Frenzel established a company, employing more than 300 home weavers from surrounding villages. Later, Frenzel established the C. A. Frenzel & Son, a weaving mill in Hirschfelde, which operated until 1930.

In 1871, the village, including the hamlet of Hältern had 604 inhabitants, which grew to 482 in 1943. With the opening of the Zittau–Hagenwerder railway (Krzewina section) in 1875, Rohnau railway station opened on the line in 1882, serving Trzciniec. The station building was destroyed during World War II, consequently closing in 1945 but still being renamed to Trzciniec Zgorzelecki.

After World War II, the area came under Polish administration, and was renamed to Trzciniec. In 1962, Turów Power Station was built south-east of the village. Trzciniec became a district of Bogatynia in 1973.
