= Sulików, Lower Silesian Voivodeship =

Sulików
- Village
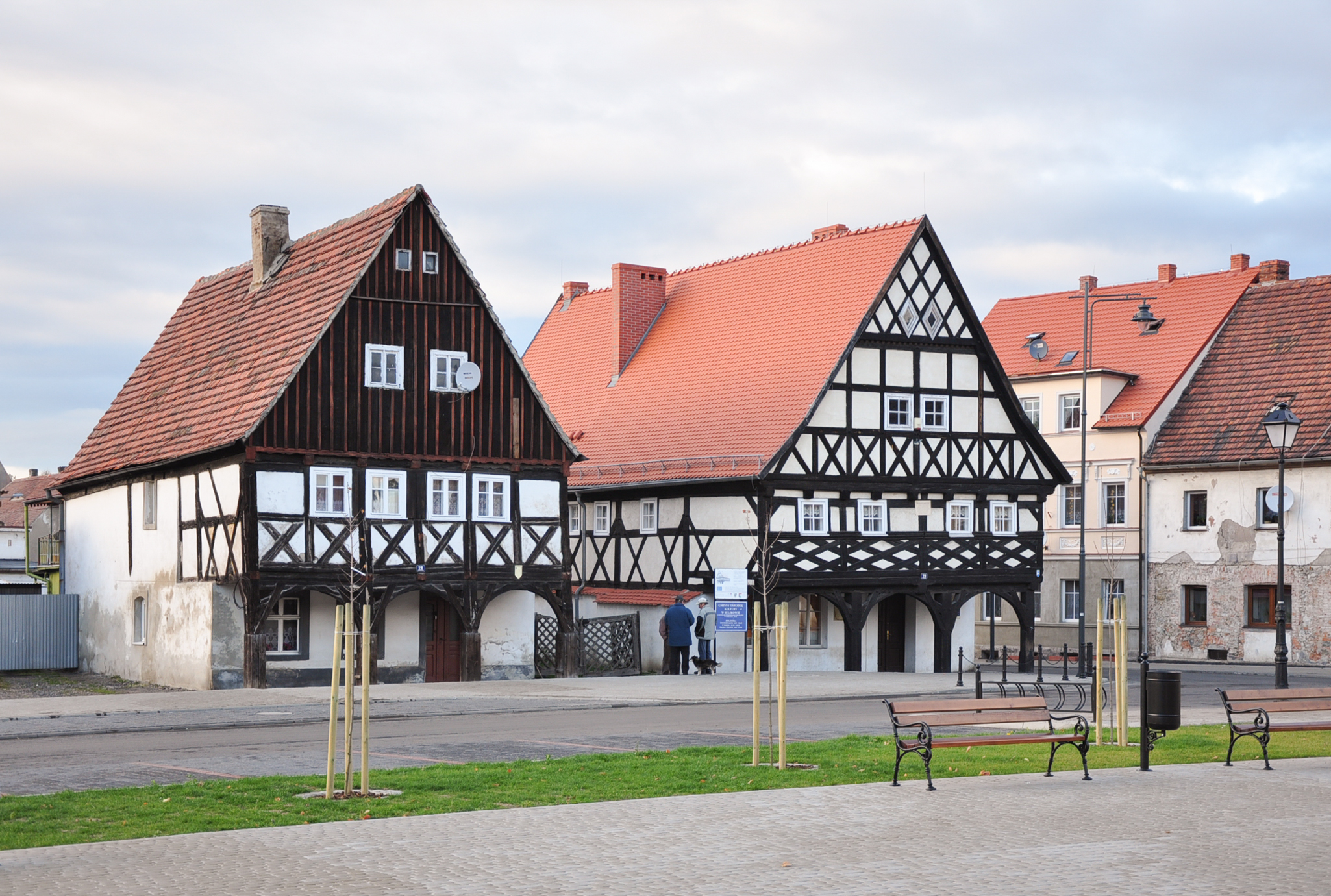
- Old houses at the Plac Wolności (Liberty Square) in Sulików

- Location within Poland
- Coordinates: 51°4′33″N 15°4′1″E
- Country: Poland
- Voivodeship: Lower Silesian
- County: Zgorzelec
- Gmina: Sulików
- First mentioned: 1234
- Population: 2,014
- Time zone: UTC+1 (CET)
  - Summer (DST): UTC+2 (CEST)
- Vehicle registration: DZG

Sulików ([suˈlikuf]) (Upper Sorbian: Šunberg; Lower Sorbian: Južoberg) is a village (former town) in Zgorzelec County, Lower Silesian Voivodeship, in south-western Poland. It is the seat of the administrative district (gmina) called Gmina Sulików, close to the Czech border.

== History ==
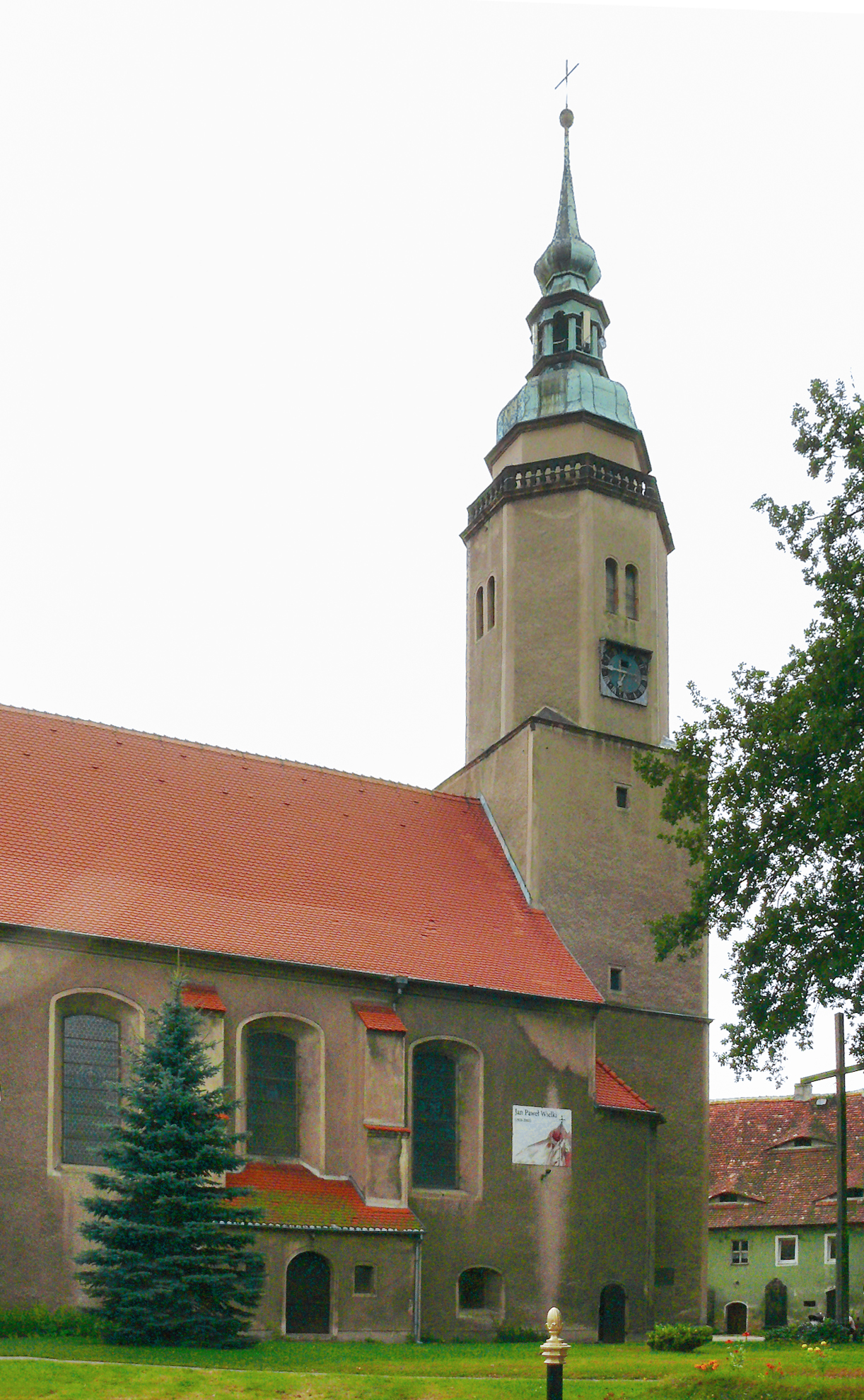
Exaltation of the Holy Cross church

In the Early Middle Ages, Sulików was a stronghold of the Bieżuńczanie tribe, one of the Polish tribes. Since the 11th century, the settlement was under Polish, Czech, Hungarian and Saxon rule. Afterwards, in 1815 it was annexed by Prussia, within which it was administratively located in the Province of Silesia, and from 1871 to 1945 it was also part of Germany. Following World War II the German populace was expelled in accordance with the Potsdam Agreement and the village was repopulated by Poles, many displaced from former eastern Poland annexed by the Soviet Union. The village became again part of Poland.

The village was served by Sulików railway station until 2000. The station is currently used as a freight loading bay.
