= Trzciniec Zgorzelecki railway station =

Former railway station in Bogatynia, south-western Poland

Trzciniec Zgorzelecki
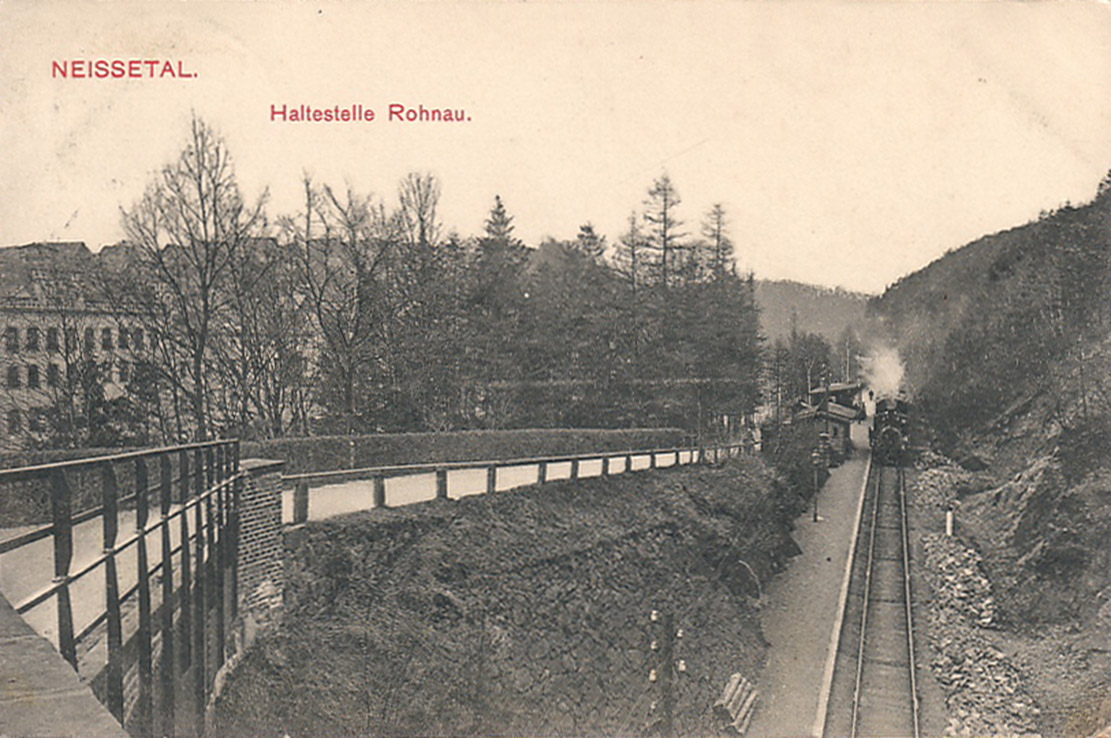
- Station in 1911

General information
- Location: Trzciniec, Bogatynia, Lower Silesian Voivodeship; Poland
- Coordinates: 50°57′08.1″N 14°53′44.0″E
- Owner: Polskie Koleje Państwowe S.A.
- Lines: Mikułowa–Bogatynia railway (freight only); Krzewina railway
- Platforms: 1

History
- Opened: 1882
- Closed: 1945
- Former names: Rohnau (before 1945)
Location
- Location within Poland Location within Lower Silesian Voivodeship

Trzciniec Zgorzelecki (German: Rohnau) was a railway station in the Trzciniec district of Bogatynia, Zgorzelec County, within the Lower Silesian Voivodeship in south-western Poland.

== History ==
The station opened in 1882 as Rohnau part of the Zittau–Hagenwerder railway.

In 1945, the station building was destroyed. After World War II, the area came under Polish administration. As a result, the remaining rail infrastructure was taken over by Polish State Railways. The station was never rebuilt, but was still renamed to Trzciniec Zgorzelecki.

In 1949, with the opening of the Mikułowa–Bogatynia railway to Turoszów, a signalbox was constructed approximately 800 m (2,600 ft) south of the site of the former station. It was used to control the junction of where the Mikułowa–Bogatynia railway and Krzewina railway branched off.

The signalbox was demolished in May 1966 after the junction was upgraded to be remotely controlled.
