= Krzewina, Lower Silesian Voivodeship =

Krzewina
- Village
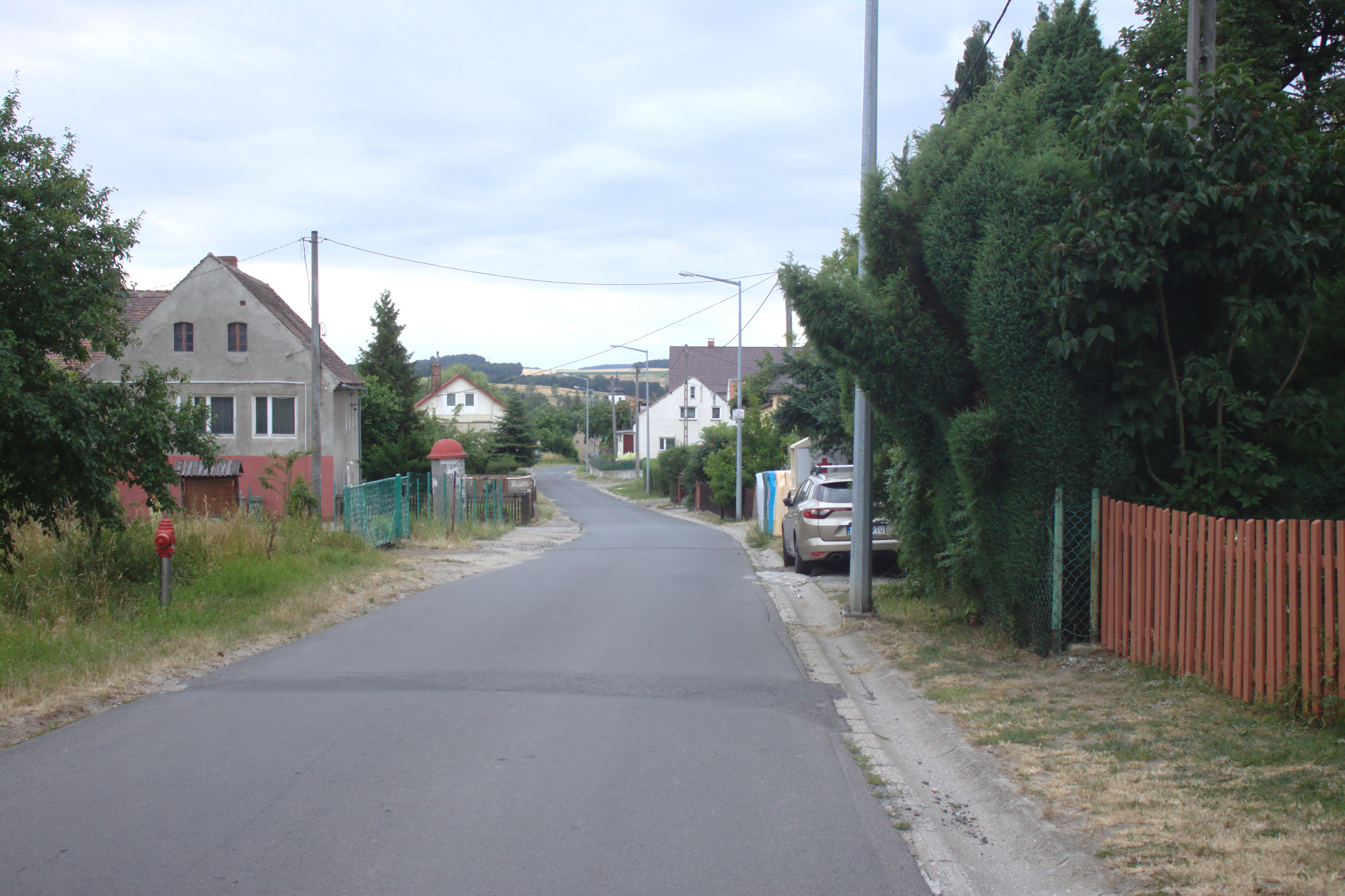
- Houses by the road
- Interactive map of Krzewina
- Location within Poland
- Coordinates: 51°1′N 14°57′E
- Country: Poland
- Voivodeship: Lower Silesian
- County: Zgorzelec
- Gmina: Bogatynia

Krzewina [kʂɛˈvina] (Upper Sorbian: Kerk) is a village in the administrative district of Gmina Bogatynia, within Zgorzelec County, Lower Silesian Voivodeship, in south-western Poland, close to the Czech and German borders.

== Transport ==
Krzewina Zgorzelecka railway station is the only railway station in Poland solely served by foreign trains, German Ostdeutsche Eisenbahn route RB 65 service: Cottbus - Görlitz - Zittau. It is located outside the village and mainly serves the German town of Ostritz, which is just across the Lusatian Neisse. Polish State Railways have had their passenger services withdrawn from this station since 2000.

== Gallery ==
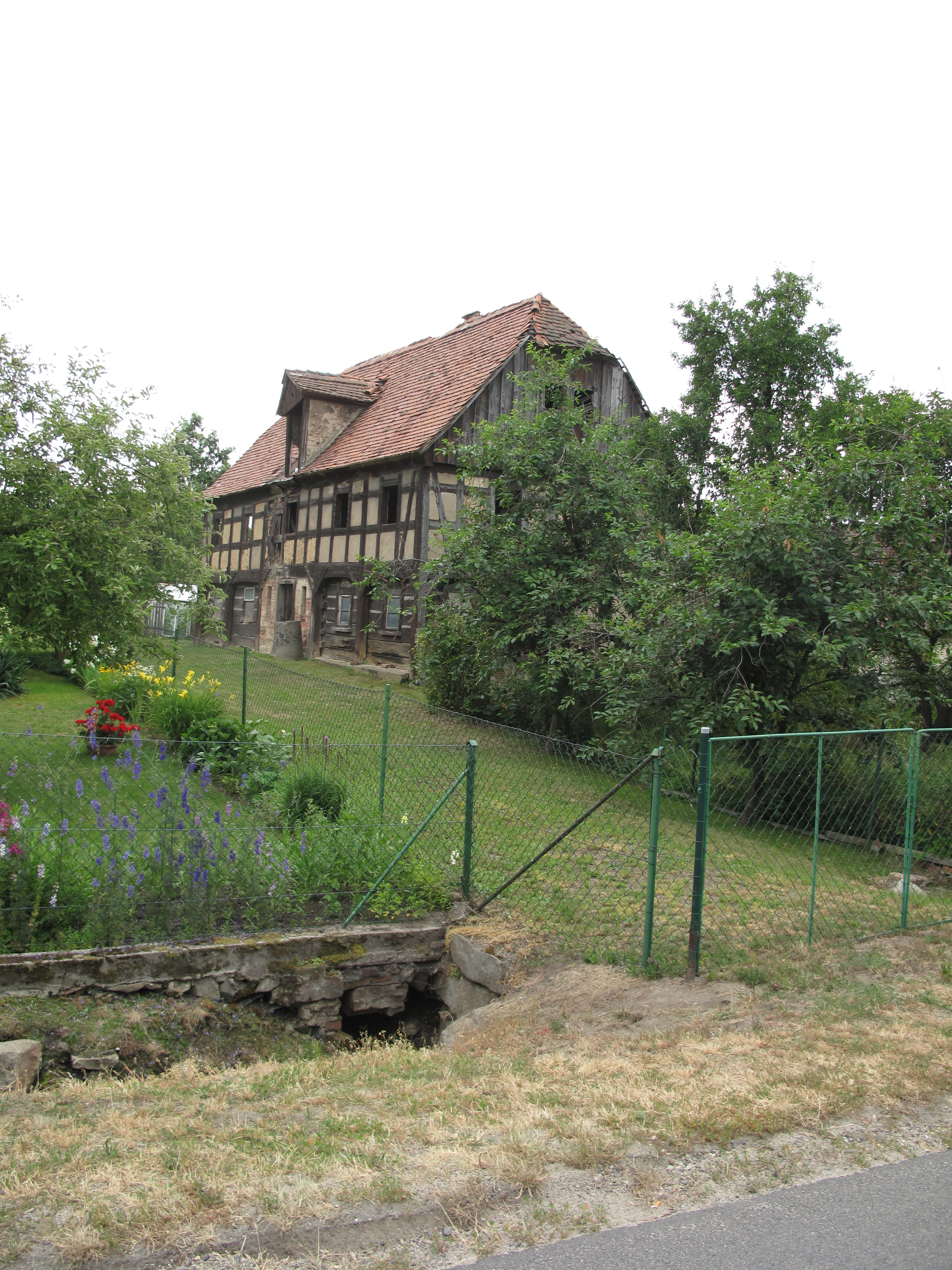
Half-timbered house

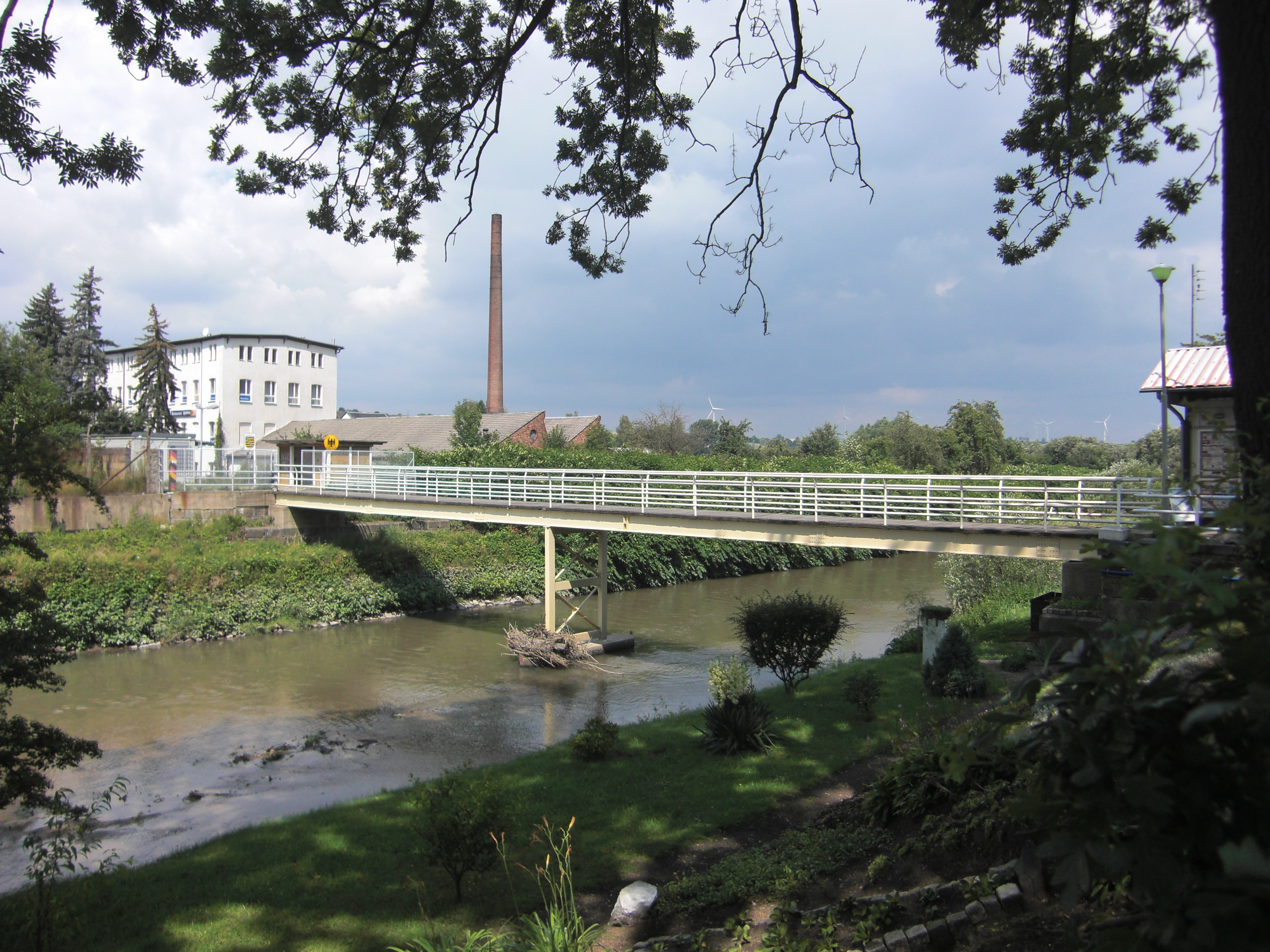
Border crossing

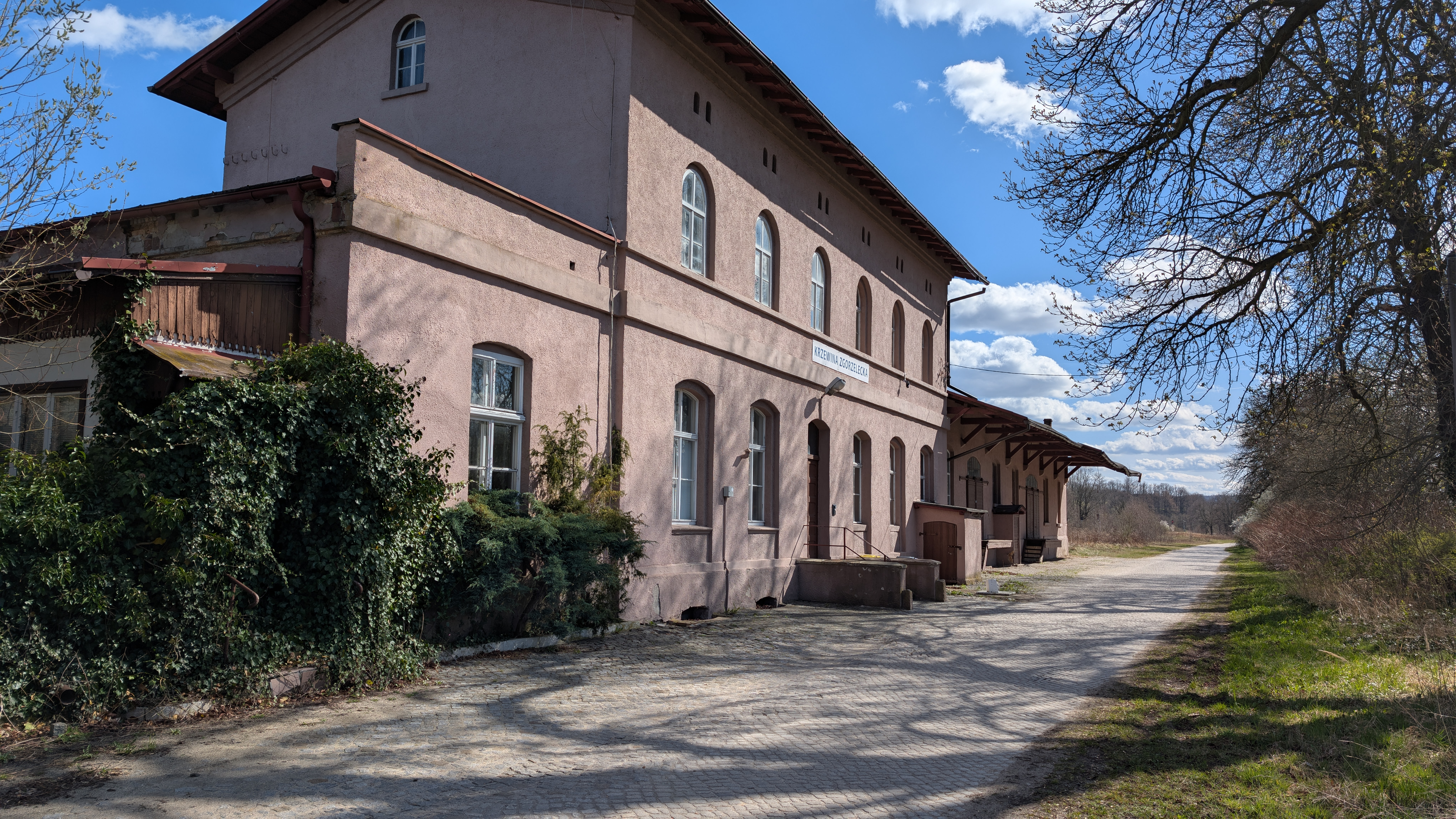
Krzewina Zgorzelecka railway station
