= Posada, Lower Silesian Voivodeship =

Posada
- Village
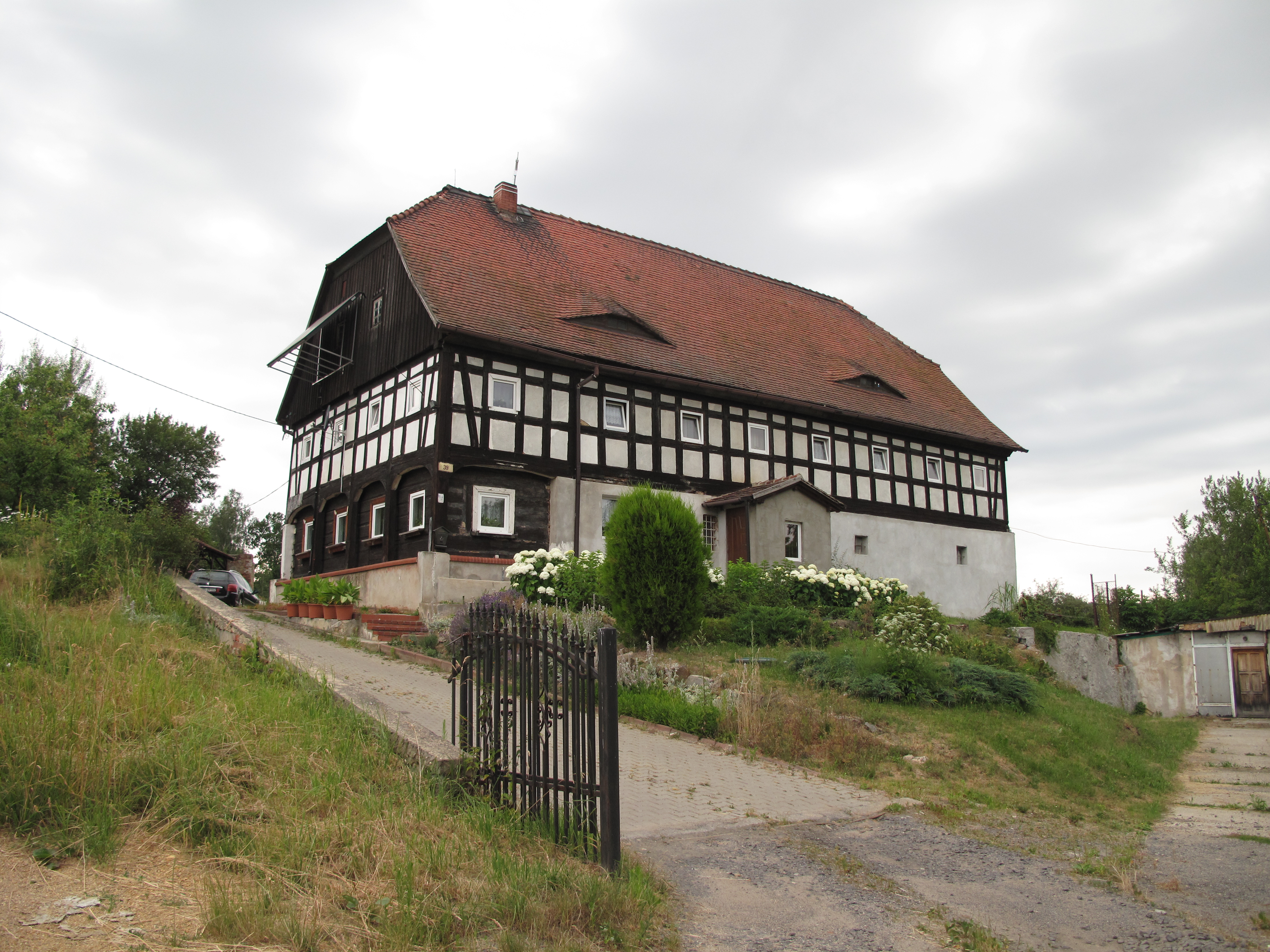
- Half-timbered house in Posada
- Interactive map of Posada
- Location within Poland
- Coordinates: 50°59′33″N 14°56′03″E
- Country: Poland
- Voivodeship: Lower Silesian
- County: Zgorzelec
- Gmina: Bogatynia
- Time zone: UTC+1 (CET)
  - Summer (DST): UTC+2 (CEST)
- Vehicle registration: DZG

Posada [pɔˈsada] (Upper Sorbian: K dispoziciji stajić) is a village in the administrative district of Gmina Bogatynia, within Zgorzelec County, Lower Silesian Voivodeship, in south-western Poland. It is located in a Polish salient between the Czech Republic and Germany.

== History ==
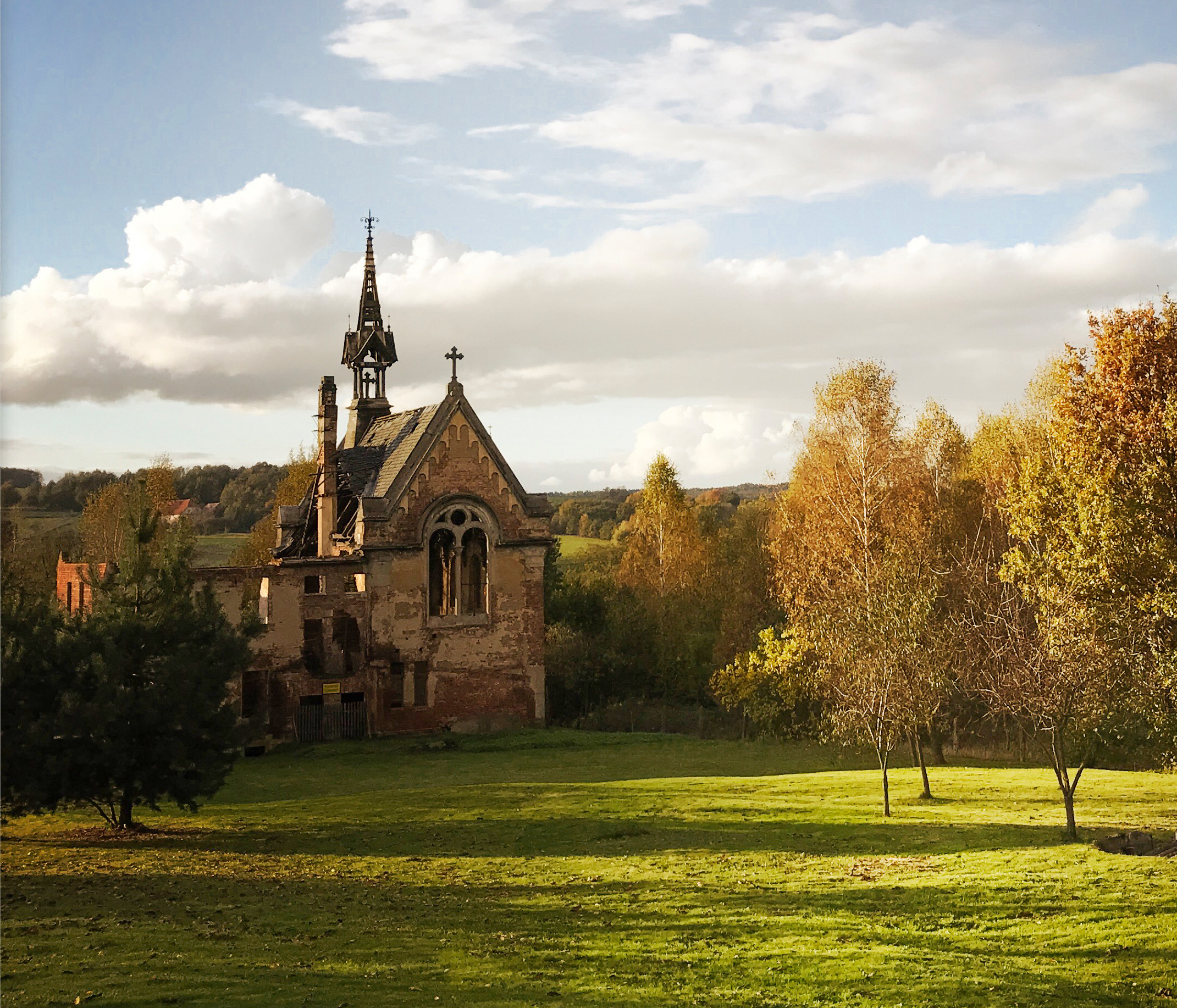
Evangelical chapel and school (2017)

In the Early Middle Ages, Posada was a stronghold of the Bieżuńczanie tribe, one of the Polish tribes. Since the 11th century, the settlement was under Polish, Czech, Hungarian and Saxon rule, and from 1871 to 1945 it was also part of Germany. After the defeat of Germany in World War II in 1945, it became again part of Poland.
