= Ostritz =

Ostritz Ostrowiec
- Town
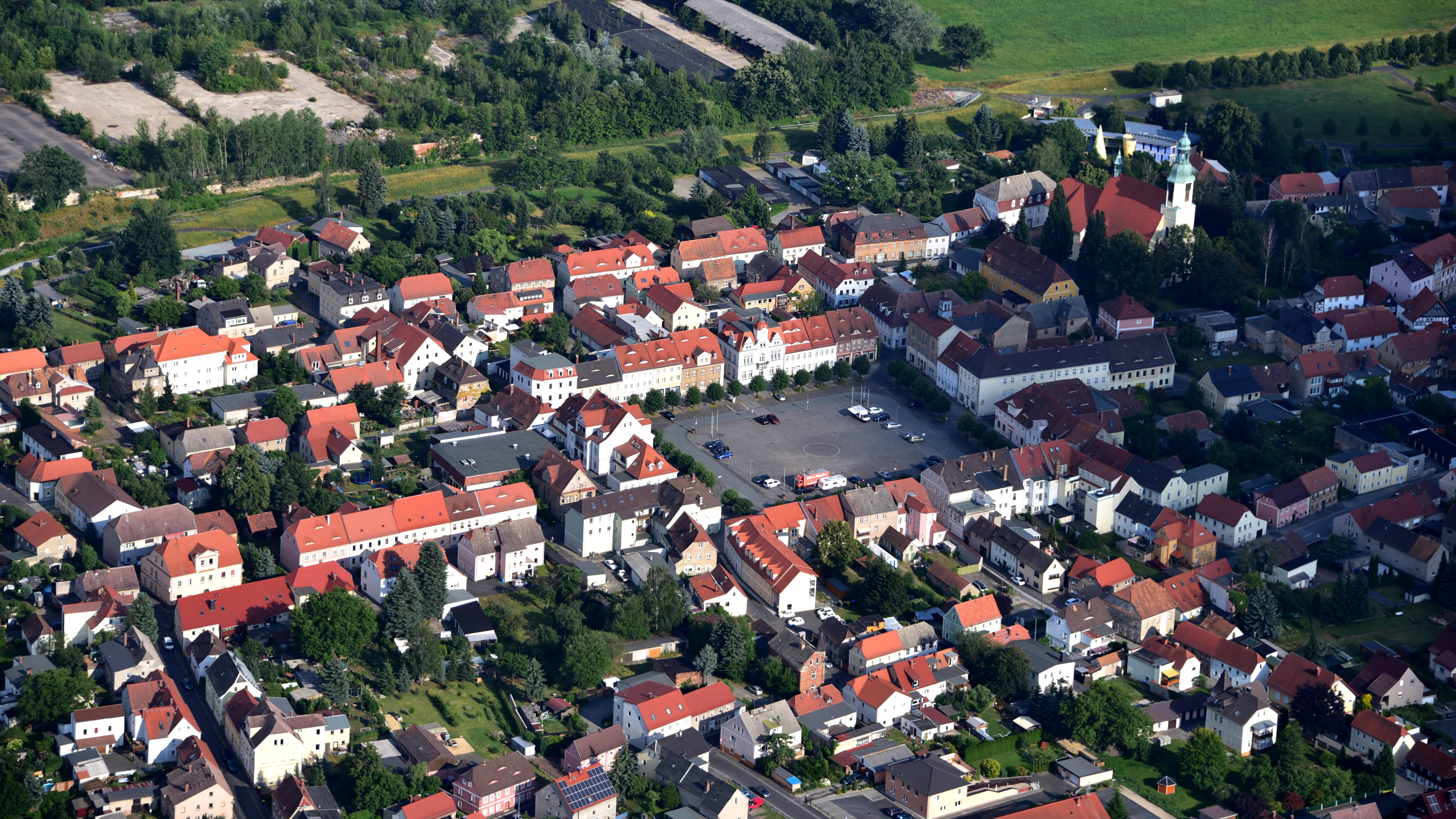
- Aerial view of the town center

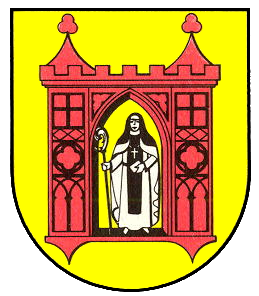
- Coat of arms

- Location of Ostritz within Görlitz district
- Interactive map of Ostritz
- Location within Germany Location within Saxony
- Coordinates: 51°0′53″N 14°55′56″E
- Country: Germany
- State: Saxony
- District: Görlitz

Government
  - Mayor (2022–29): Stephanie Rikl (Ind.)

Area
  - Total: 23.48 km^{2} (9.07 sq mi)
- Elevation: 207 m (679 ft)

Population (2025-12-31)
  - Total: 2,204
  - Density: 93.87/km^{2} (243.1/sq mi)
- Time zone: UTC+01:00 (CET)
  - Summer (DST): UTC+02:00 (CEST)
- Postal codes: 02899
- Dialling codes: 035823
- Vehicle registration: GR, LÖB, NOL, NY, WSW, ZI
- Website: www.ostritz.de

Ostritz (German pronunciation: [ˈɔstʁɪts]; Upper Sorbian: Wostrowc [ˈwɔstʁɔfts]; Polish: Ostrowiec ['ɔsˈtrɔ.vʲɛt͡s]) is a town in the district Görlitz, in Saxony, in eastern Germany. It is situated on the border with Poland, on the left bank of the Lusatian Neisse, 16 km south of Görlitz.

It is located next to the thirteenth century Cistercian nunnery, St. Marienthal Abbey, which is still functioning.

== History ==
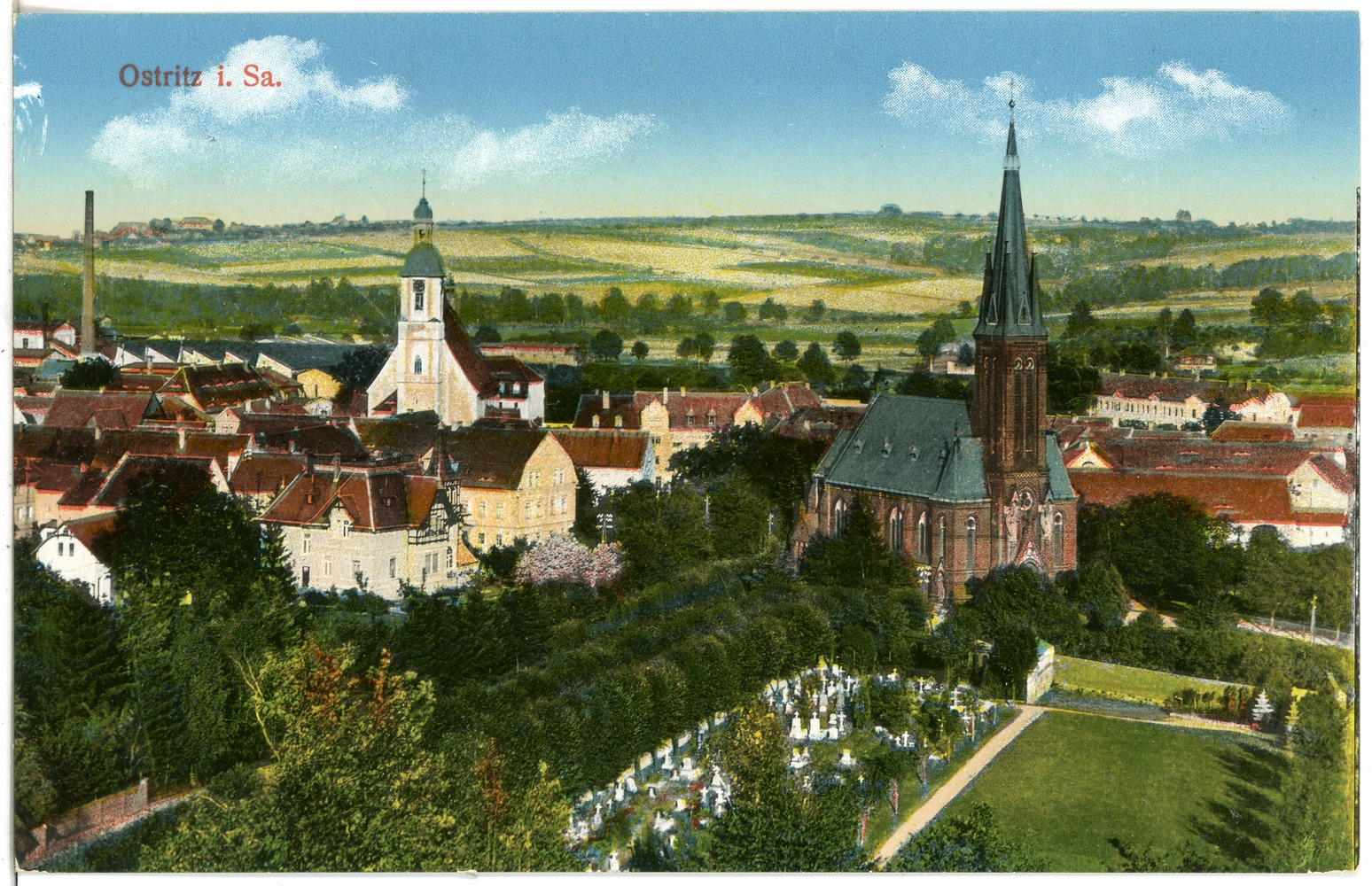
Postcard from the 1920s

In 1230, the settlement was granted to the Dohna family by the Bohemian King. In 1234, Queen consort Kunigunde of Bohemia founded the first Cistercian abbey in Upper Lusatia in the settlement. In 1319, it passed to the Duchy of Jawor, the southwesternmost duchy of fragmented Piast-ruled Poland. Duke Henry I of Jawor granted a forest and a portion of the settlement's annual income to the monastery. In 1346, the settlement became again part of the Kingdom of Bohemia. In 1346, the abbey became the sole owner of the settlement, confirmed by King John of Bohemia. In 1357 it was granted town rights. In 1373, a town hall and defensive walls were built. The Lusatian League opposed the creation of a new rival centre, and sent an expedition which destroyed the town hall and town gates that same year. During the Hussite Wars, the town was burned down in 1427.

In 1469 the town passed to Hungary, and in 1490 it returned to the Czech Crown, then under the rule of Vladislaus II. From 1635, it was ruled by the Electors of Saxony, from 1697 to 1763 also Kings of Poland.

It was the scene of a small battle in the Seven Years' War, described in a contemporary journal as follows: On 31st December 1756 a picket of Prince Heinrich's Regiment under the command of Major Heinrich von Blumenthal, which had been sent out from Zittau to Ostritz, was attacked by 500 Croats who, notwithstanding their numerical superiority were thoroughly beaten off. The Croats got right into the town and set fire to some houses, but the fires were put out. The most serious loss on the Prussian side was the brave Major von Blumenthal, who fell right at the beginning of the action.

During the Napoleonic Wars, the Polish VIII Corps of Prince Józef Poniatowski fought in the area in 1813, and from 17 August 1813 Prince Poniatowski stayed in the town.

In recent years, the town has become known for its efforts in recycling and ecological renewable energy.

Due to territorial changes after the Second World War its railway station lies in the Polish village of Krzewina. It is part of the Görlitz-Zittau train line.

The "Shield and Sword" festival (or "SS Festival" for short) was launched on 20 April 2018 commemorating Adolf Hitler's birthday and was opposed by the Ostritz Peace Festival established by local residents. In 2019, a court in Dresden imposed a ban on the sale or possession of alcohol at the Schild and Schwert Festival. Police confiscated thousands of litres of beer and local residents bought up the entire stock from the local supermarket.

== Transport ==
The town is served by Krzewina Zgorzelecka railway station. Until 1945 the station was part of Ostritz itself, however this changed due to territorial changes after the war.

== Gallery ==
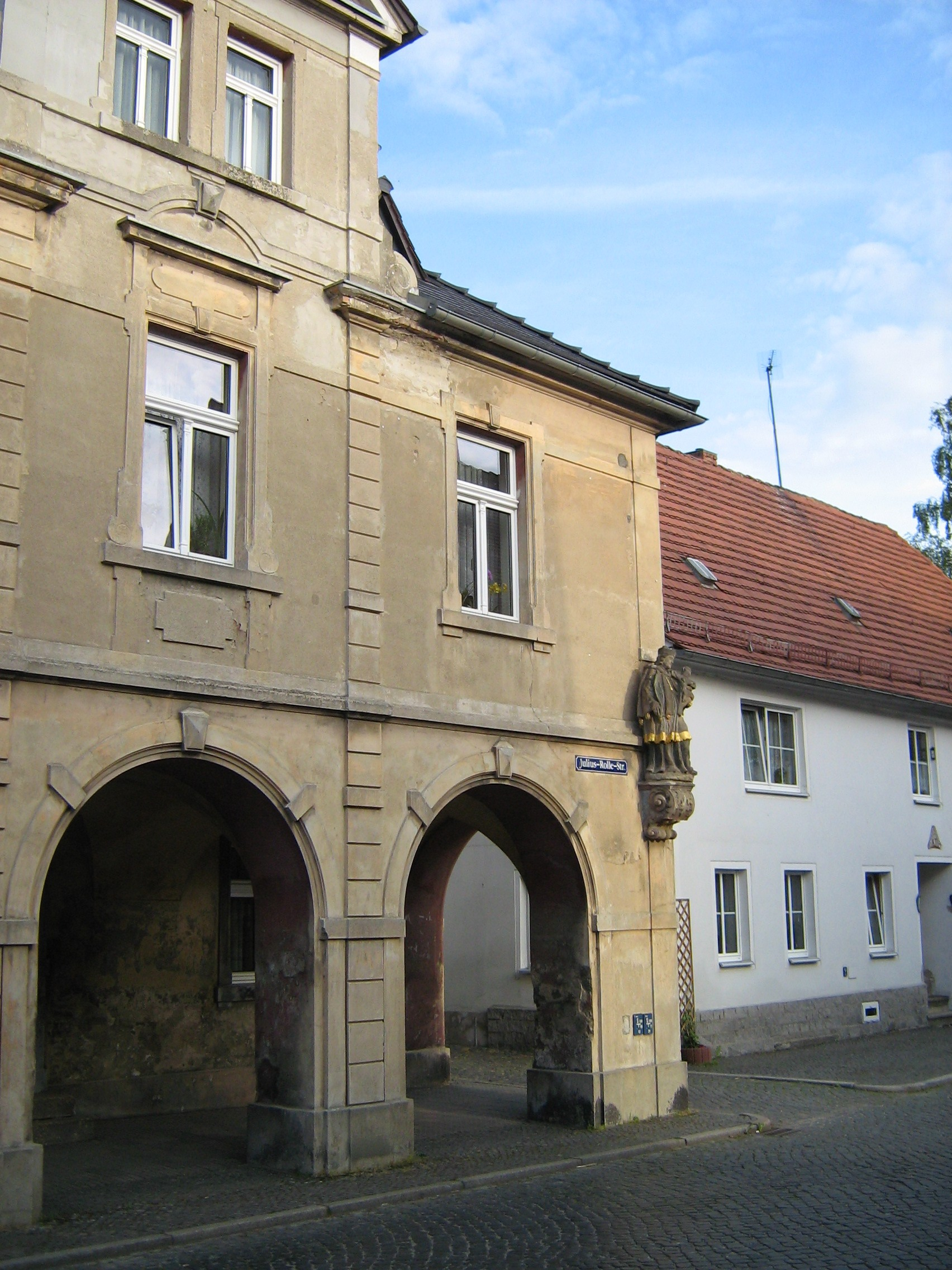
Former community centre (Bürgerhaus) with statue

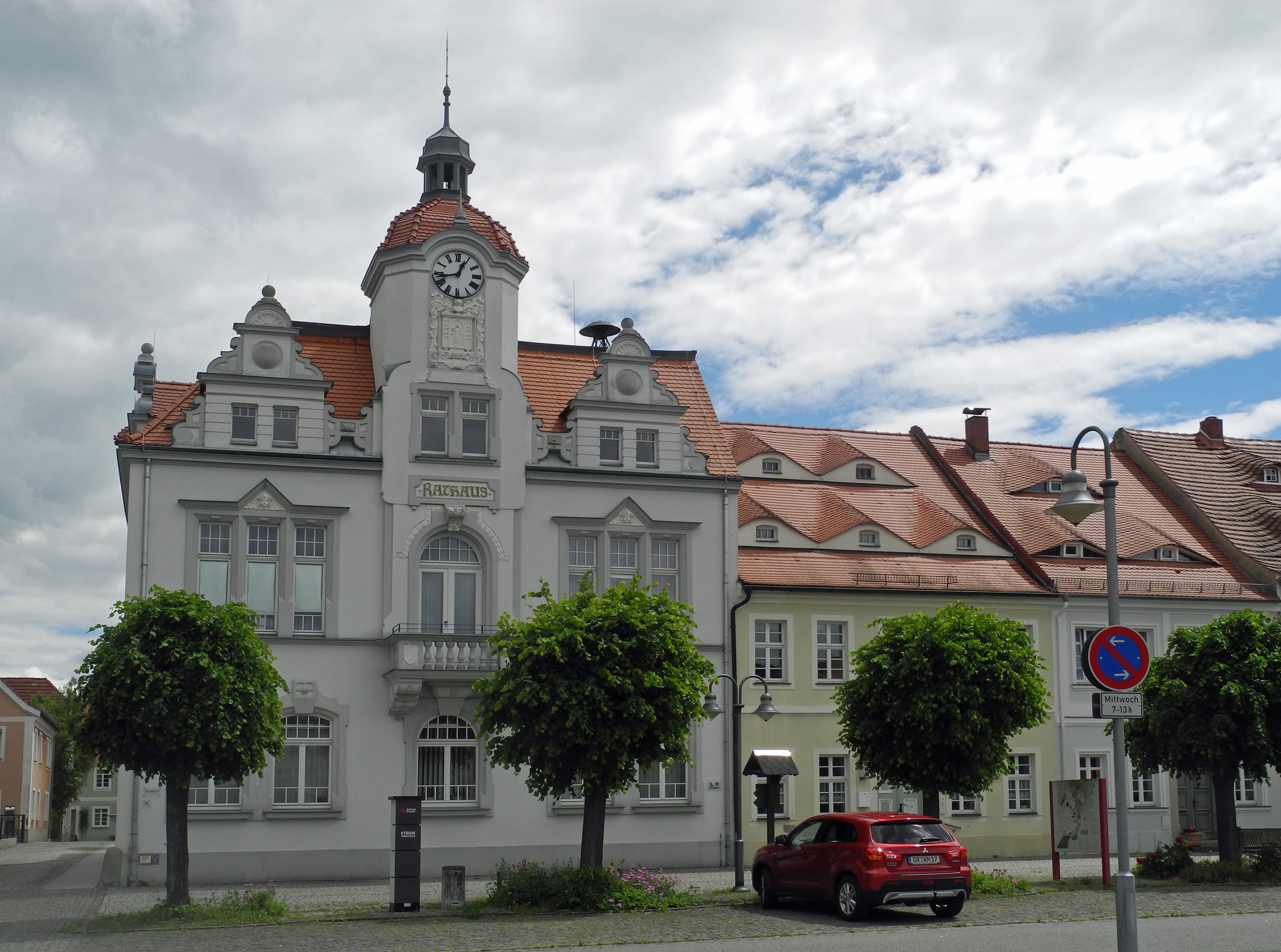
Town Hall at the Market Square

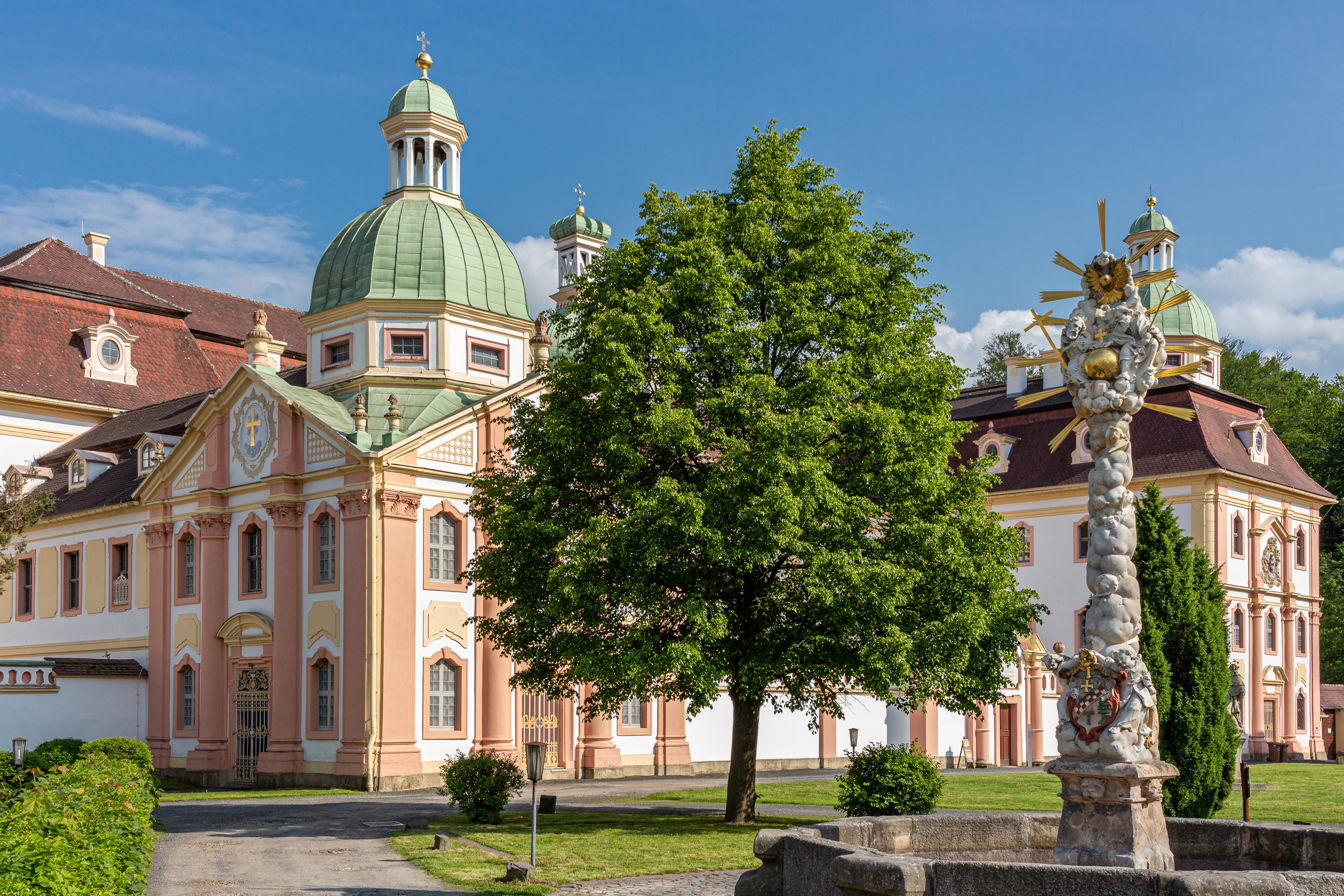
St. Marienthal Abbey

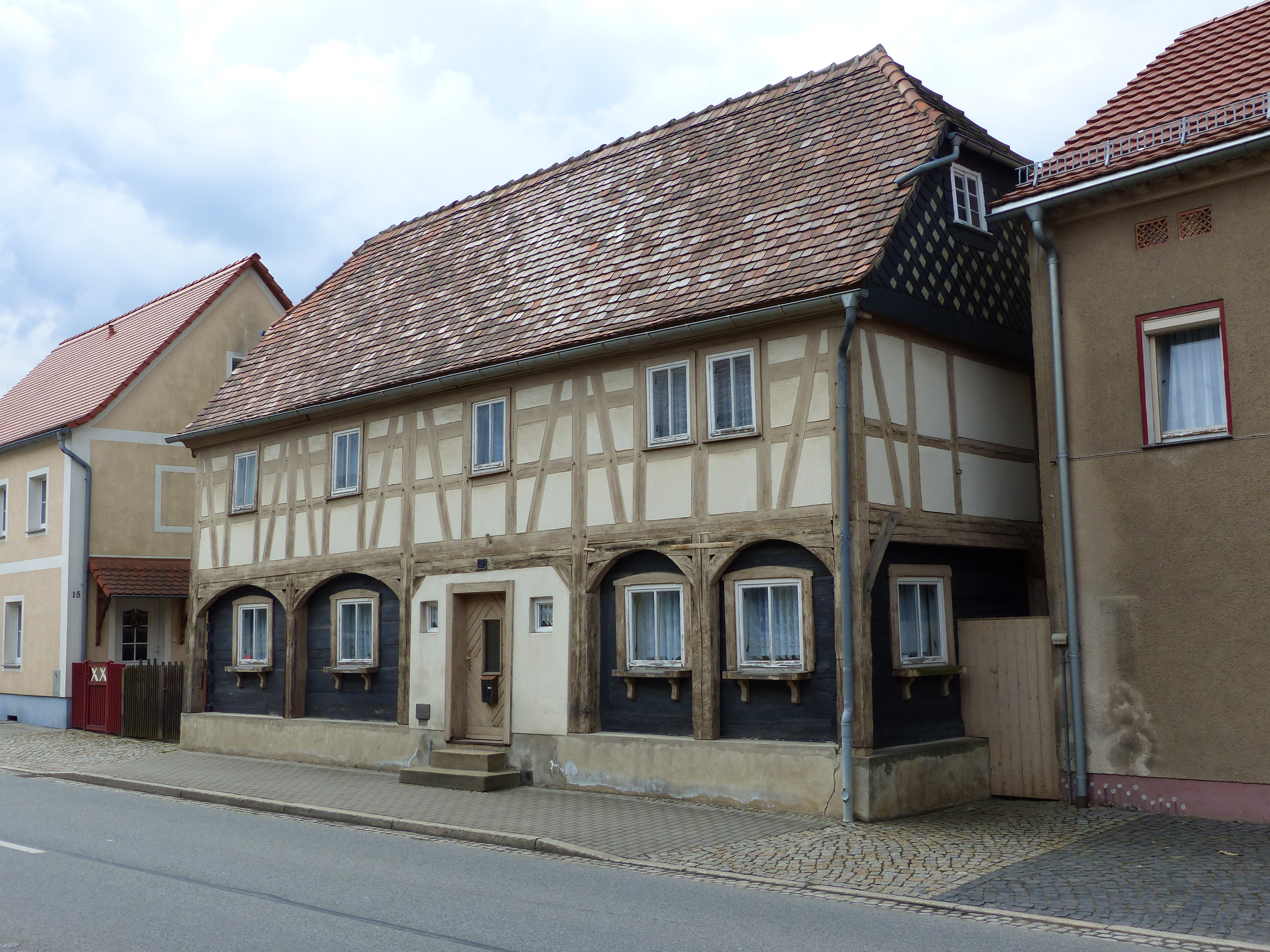
Typical Upper Lusatian house
