= Bogatynia railway station =

Former railway station in Bogatynia, south-western Poland

Bogatynia
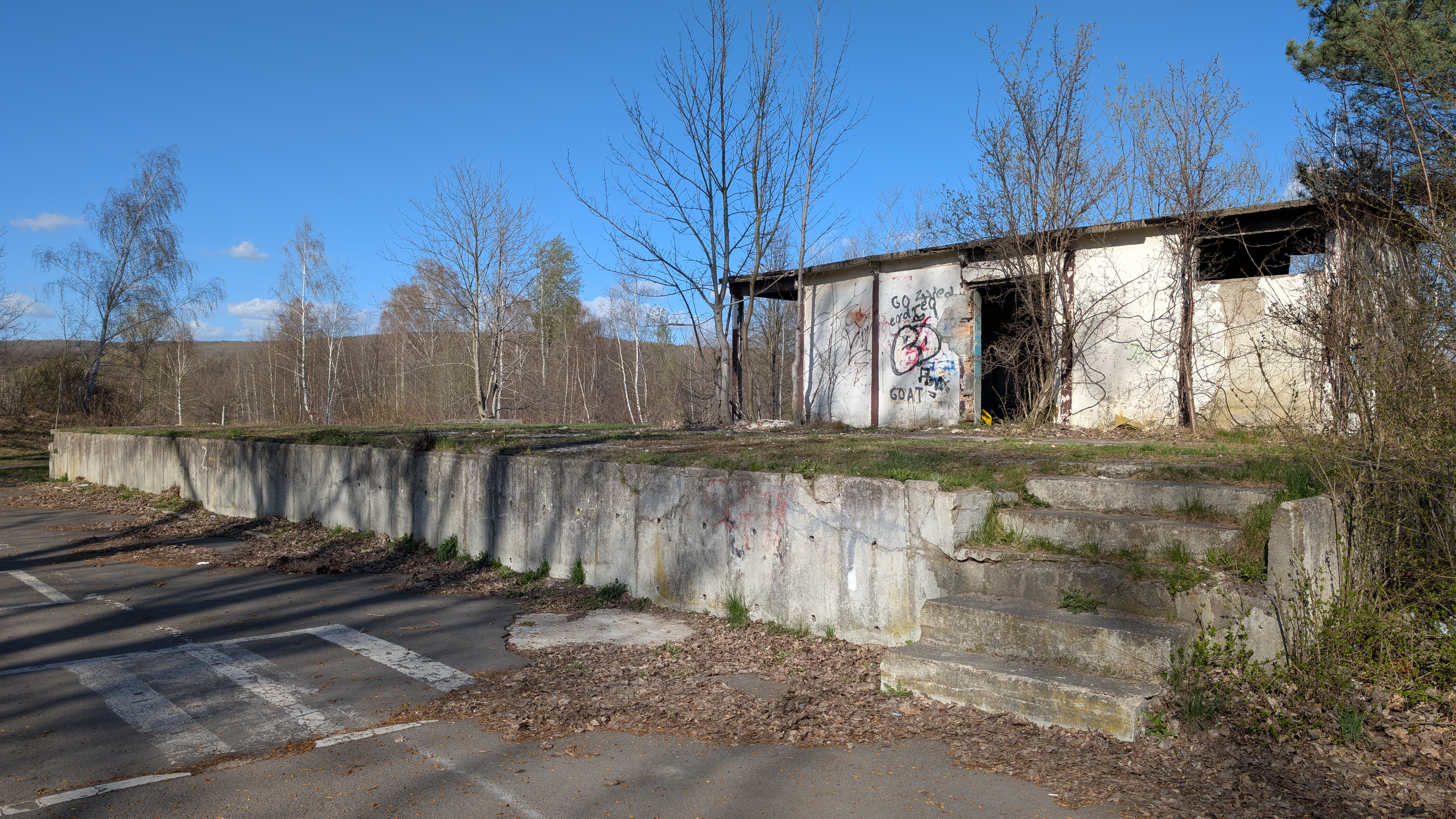
- Abandoned entrance to the former station in 2026

General information
- Location: Bogatynia, Lower Silesian Voivodeship; Poland
- Coordinates: 50°54′44.3″N 14°57′31.3″E
- Owner: Polish State Railways
- Line: Mikułowa–Bogatynia railway
- Platforms: 2

History
- Opened: 29 May 1960
- Closed: 2 April 2000
Location
- Location within Poland Location within Lower Silesian Voivodeship

Bogatynia was a railway station on the Mikułowa–Bogatynia railway in the town of Bogatynia, Zgorzelec County, within the Lower Silesian Voivodeship in south-western Poland.

Passenger services were withdrawn from the station on 2 April 2000.

== History ==
The station opened on 29 May 1960, replacing Bogatynia (Wąskotorowa) which closed the following year. In 1990, the station became a loading bay for freight trains. The station closed on 2 April 2000.

In 2026, Polish State Railways (PKP) proposed the reconstruction of the station and Mikułowa–Bogatynia railway, which would lead to the re-opening of the line. PKP is proposing for the line to be taken over by the Lower Silesian Voivodeship, who would also fund the majority of the reconstruction, which is estimated at around 200 million Polish złoty. The line would be operated by local operator, Lower Silesian Railways. The proposal is underway and has not yet been approved. If the proposal was to be approved, the estimated re-opening date of the line would be between 2029–2030.

== Former services ==
Preceding station	Disused railways	Following station
Terminus	Polish State Railways; Mikułowa–Bogatynia	Turoszów Kopalnia towards Mikułowa
