= Porajów =

- Village
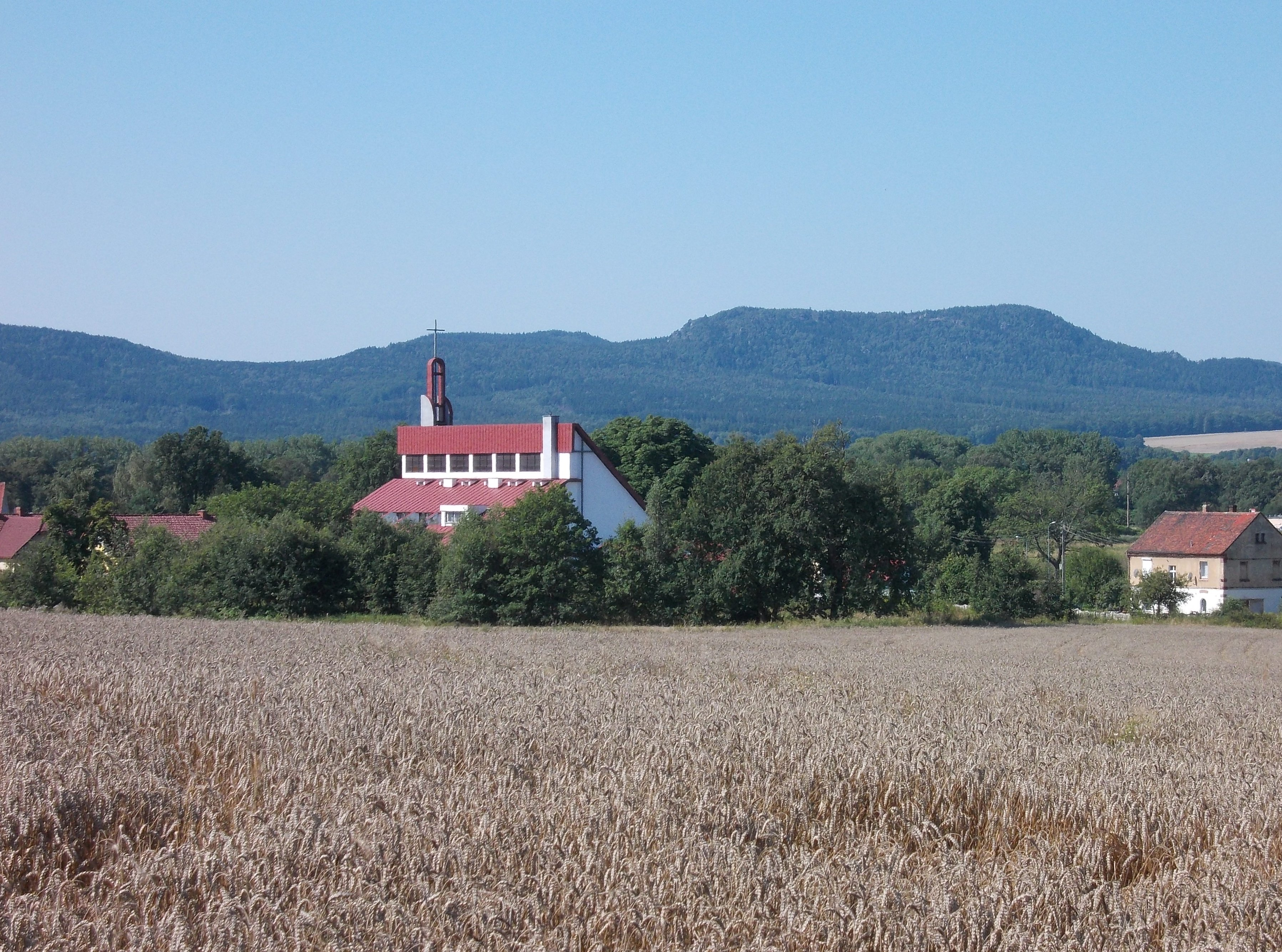
- View of Porajów with the Sacred Heart Church
- Interactive map of Porajów
- Location within Poland
- Coordinates: 50°53′04″N 14°49′57″E
- Country: Poland
- Voivodeship: Lower Silesian
- County: Zgorzelec
- Gmina: Bogatynia

Population
  - Total: 1,513 (2,011)
- Time zone: UTC+1 (CET)
  - Summer (DST): UTC+2 (CEST)

Porajów [pɔˈrajuf] (German: Großporitsch) is a village in the administrative district of Gmina Bogatynia, within Zgorzelec County, Lower Silesian Voivodeship, in south-western Poland, close to the Czech and German borders.

The village lies on a railway line and road running from Zittau in Germany to Hrádek nad Nisou village in Liberec district in the Czech Republic; however the trains do not stop on Polish territory.

There is a historic railway viaduct connecting Porajów with Zittau. There is also a Catholic church of the Sacred Heart of Jesus in the village.

== History ==
The village was first mentioned in the 14th century, it was since ruled by local Polish dukes of the Piast dynasty, Bohemian and Hungarian kings, Saxon electors and Polish kings, and from 1871 to 1945 it was part of Germany. From 1920 to 1945 it was located within the city limits of nearby Zittau, before it became a separate village again, as part of post-World War II Poland.
