= M45 at the 2012 European Masters Athletics Championships =

These are the results for men aged 45 to 49 at the eighteenth European Masters Athletics Championships, held in Zittau, Germany; Zgorzelec, Poland; and Hrádek nad Nisou, Czech Republic, from August 16–25, 2012. The European Masters Athletics Championships are an athletics competition for people over 35 years of age, referred to as masters athletics.

Fewer countries participated compared with the previous championships in Nyiregyhaza, but over 700 more athletes participated, giving it the third-largest attendance of any championship run by European Masters Athletics.

== Results ==
=== 100 metres ===
Pos	Athlete	Country	Results
1st place, gold medalist(s)	Massimiliano Scarponi	Italy	11.23
2nd place, silver medalist(s)	Meinert Moeller	Germany	11.71
3rd place, bronze medalist(s)	Jean Luc Baralle	France	11.79

=== 200 metres ===
Pos	Athlete	Country	Results
1st place, gold medalist(s)	Massimiliano Scarponi	Italy	22.57
2nd place, silver medalist(s)	Francis Navarro Sanchez	Spain	23.28
3rd place, bronze medalist(s)	Gunter Bernhard	Germany	23.36
3rd place, bronze medalist(s)	Meinert Moeller	Germany	23.36

=== 400 metres ===
Pos	Athlete	Country	Results
1st place, gold medalist(s)	Massimiliano Scarponi	Italy	50.49
2nd place, silver medalist(s)	Joerg Schaefer	Germany	51.79
3rd place, bronze medalist(s)	Gunter Bernhard	Germany	51.93

=== 800 metres ===
Pos	Athlete	Country	Results
1st place, gold medalist(s)	Florian Zeh	Austria	2:01.28
2nd place, silver medalist(s)	Adrian Haines	Great Britain	2:01.45
3rd place, bronze medalist(s)	Antonio Oliveira	Portugal	2:01.70

=== 1500 metres ===
Pos	Athlete	Country	Results
1st place, gold medalist(s)	Florian Zeh	Austria	4:12.92
2nd place, silver medalist(s)	Milan Serafin	Czech Republic	4:13.87
3rd place, bronze medalist(s)	Antonio Oliveira	Portugal	4:14.79

=== 5000 metres ===
Pos	Athlete	Country	Results
1st place, gold medalist(s)	Francisco Jav Fontaneda	Spain	15:14.49
2nd place, silver medalist(s)	Piotr Poblocki	Poland	15:31.88
3rd place, bronze medalist(s)	Jan Rybarczyk	Poland	15:35.12

Note: Original winner Wieslaw Pietka Poland was disqualified after a positive drug test

=== 10000 metres ===
Pos	Athlete	Country	Results
1st place, gold medalist(s)	Francisco Jav Fontaneda	Spain	32:27.58
2nd place, silver medalist(s)	Piotr Poblocki	Poland	32:31.60
3rd place, bronze medalist(s)	Oskar De Kuijer	Netherlands	32:50.04

=== 110 metres hurdles ===
Pos	Athlete	Country	Results
1st place, gold medalist(s)	Serge Beckers	Belgium	16.35
2nd place, silver medalist(s)	Glen Reddington	Great Britain	17.48
3rd place, bronze medalist(s)	Thomas Lindenmayer	Germany	18.27

=== 400 metres hurdles ===
Pos	Athlete	Country	Results
1st place, gold medalist(s)	Frederic Peroni	Italy	59.24
2nd place, silver medalist(s)	Javier Foncea	Spain	1:00.20
3rd place, bronze medalist(s)	Martin Schumacher	Germany	1:01.74

=== 3000 metres steeplechase ===
Pos	Athlete	Country	Results
1st place, gold medalist(s)	Gilles Pelletier	France	9:57.69
2nd place, silver medalist(s)	Poul Grenaa	Denmark	10:27.80
3rd place, bronze medalist(s)	Ljubisa Radisic	Serbia	10:39.25

Note: Original winner Wieslaw Pietka Poland was disqualified after a positive drug test

=== 4×100 metres relay ===
Pos	Athletes	Country	Results
1st place, gold medalist(s)	Roberto Barontini	Italy	44.54
1st place, gold medalist(s)	Paolo Bertaccini	Italy	44.54
1st place, gold medalist(s)	Alberto Zanelli	Italy	44.54
1st place, gold medalist(s)	Massimiliano Scarponi	Italy	44.54
2nd place, silver medalist(s)	Dirk Bonte	Belgium	44.89
2nd place, silver medalist(s)	Marc Pottiez	Belgium	44.89
2nd place, silver medalist(s)	Johan Wonnink	Belgium	44.89
2nd place, silver medalist(s)	Erwin Thibau	Belgium	44.89
3rd place, bronze medalist(s)	Meinert Moeller	Germany	45.41
3rd place, bronze medalist(s)	Gunter Bernhard	Germany	45.41
3rd place, bronze medalist(s)	Gerald Kornisch	Germany	45.41
3rd place, bronze medalist(s)	Heiko Schurz	Germany	45.41

=== 4×400 metres relay ===
Pos	Athletes	Country	Results
1st place, gold medalist(s)	Meinert Moeller	Germany	3:28.91
1st place, gold medalist(s)	Gunter Bernhard	Germany	3:28.91
1st place, gold medalist(s)	Christoph Mueller	Germany	3:28.91
1st place, gold medalist(s)	Joerg Schaefer	Germany	3:28.91
2nd place, silver medalist(s)	Paolo Bertaccini	Italy	3:35.38
2nd place, silver medalist(s)	Roberto Barontini	Italy	3:35.38
2nd place, silver medalist(s)	Alberto Zanelli	Italy	3:35.38
2nd place, silver medalist(s)	Massimiliano Scarponi	Italy	3:35.38
3rd place, bronze medalist(s)	Dirk Bonte	Belgium	3:38.18
3rd place, bronze medalist(s)	Johan Wonnink	Belgium	3:38.18
3rd place, bronze medalist(s)	Marc Pottiez	Belgium	3:38.18
3rd place, bronze medalist(s)	Erwin Thibau	Belgium	3:38.18

=== Marathon ===
Pos	Athlete	Country	Results
1st place, gold medalist(s)	Mike Poch	Germany	2:32:35
2nd place, silver medalist(s)	Matthias Koch	Germany	2:36:48
3rd place, bronze medalist(s)	Thomas Braukmann	Germany	2:42:31

=== High jump ===
Pos	Athlete	Country	Results
1st place, gold medalist(s)	Ugis Lasmanis	Latvia	1.90
2nd place, silver medalist(s)	Gunter Gasper	Austria	1.87
3rd place, bronze medalist(s)	Oleg Kramar	Ukraine	1.84

=== Pole vault ===
Pos	Athlete	Country	Results
1st place, gold medalist(s)	Mark Johnson	Great Britain	4.40
2nd place, silver medalist(s)	Jozef Vasina	Slovakia	4.00
3rd place, bronze medalist(s)	Salvador Vila	Spain	3.90

=== Long jump ===
Pos	Athlete	Country	Results
1st place, gold medalist(s)	Michele Tico	Italy	6.42
2nd place, silver medalist(s)	Ulrich Ratsch	Germany	6.25
3rd place, bronze medalist(s)	Philippe Poulain	Belgium	6.20

=== Triple jump ===
Pos	Athlete	Country	Results
1st place, gold medalist(s)	Odysseas Skamatzouras	Greece	13.60
2nd place, silver medalist(s)	Andre Briscan	France	13.58
3rd place, bronze medalist(s)	Vladimir Pankratov	Russia	13.48

=== Shot put ===
Pos	Athlete	Country	Results
1st place, gold medalist(s)	Arto Eskelinen	Finland	15.61
2nd place, silver medalist(s)	Janusz Chilmanowicz	Poland	14.58
3rd place, bronze medalist(s)	John Nicholls	Great Britain	14.53

=== Discus throw ===
Pos	Athlete	Country	Results
1st place, gold medalist(s)	Otto Benczenleitner	Hungary	49.66
2nd place, silver medalist(s)	Jens Kaden	Germany	40.76
3rd place, bronze medalist(s)	Adrian Ernst	Germany	39.99

=== Hammer throw ===
Pos	Athlete	Country	Results
1st place, gold medalist(s)	Ralf Jossa	Germany	65.38
2nd place, silver medalist(s)	Balazs Lezsak	Hungary	58.60
3rd place, bronze medalist(s)	Ruediger Moehring	Germany	47.36

=== Javelin throw ===
Pos	Athlete	Country	Results
1st place, gold medalist(s)	Torsten Heinrich	Germany	57.29
2nd place, silver medalist(s)	Michael Rueckel	Germany	55.97
3rd place, bronze medalist(s)	Emmanuel Greber	France	54.80

=== Weight throw ===
Pos	Athlete	Country	Results
1st place, gold medalist(s)	Ralf Jossa	Germany	19.96
2nd place, silver medalist(s)	Jan Bakala	Czech Republic	14.73
3rd place, bronze medalist(s)	Erwin Suvaal	Netherlands	14.66

=== Throws pentathlon ===
Pos	Athlete	Country	Results
1st place, gold medalist(s)	Iver Hytten	Norway	4262
2nd place, silver medalist(s)	Marek Stolarczyk	Poland	3769
3rd place, bronze medalist(s)	Jan Bakala	Czech Republic	3590

=== Decathlon ===
Pos	Athlete	Country	Results
1st place, gold medalist(s)	Thomas Stewens	Germany	7562
2nd place, silver medalist(s)	Christopher Gerhard	Germany	7546
3rd place, bronze medalist(s)	Christoph Schiefermayer	Austria	7257

=== 5000 metre track race walk ===
Pos	Athlete	Country	Results
1st place, gold medalist(s)	Walter Arena	Italy	23:18.17
2nd place, silver medalist(s)	Petro Garnyk	Ukraine	24:07.75
3rd place, bronze medalist(s)	Salvatore Cacia	Italy	24:42.87

=== 20000 metre road race walk ===
Pos	Athlete	Country	Results
1st place, gold medalist(s)	Petro Garnyk	Ukraine	1:45:39
2nd place, silver medalist(s)	Salvatore Cacia	Italy	1:47:24
3rd place, bronze medalist(s)	Julian Iglesias	Spain	1:49:12
