= Działoszyn (disambiguation) =

Działoszyn is a town in Łódź Voivodeship (central Poland).

Działoszyn may also refer to:

- Gmina Działoszyn, administrative district in Łódź Voivodeship, (central Poland)
- Działoszyn, Lower Silesian Voivodeship, a village in Zgorzelec County, Lower Silesian Voivodeship (SW Poland)
