= Wyszków (disambiguation) =

Wyszków may refer to the following places in Poland:

- Wyszków, Węgrów County in Masovian Voivodeship (east-central Poland)
- Wyszków, Wyszków County, a town in Masovian Voivodeship (east-central Poland)
- Wyszków, Lower Silesian Voivodeship (south-west Poland)
- Wyszków, Opole Voivodeship (south-west Poland)
