= Bratków =

Bratków may refer to the following places in Poland:

- Bratków, Lower Silesian Voivodeship (south-west Poland)
- Bratków, Łódź Voivodeship (central Poland)
