= Białopole =

Białopole may refer to the following places in Poland:

- Białopole, Lower Silesian Voivodeship (south-west Poland)
- Białopole, Lublin Voivodeship (east Poland)
