= Wolanów =

Wolanów may refer to the following places in Poland:

- Wolanów, Lower Silesian Voivodeship (south-west Poland)
- Wolanów, Masovian Voivodeship (east-central Poland)
