= Lutogniewice =

- Village
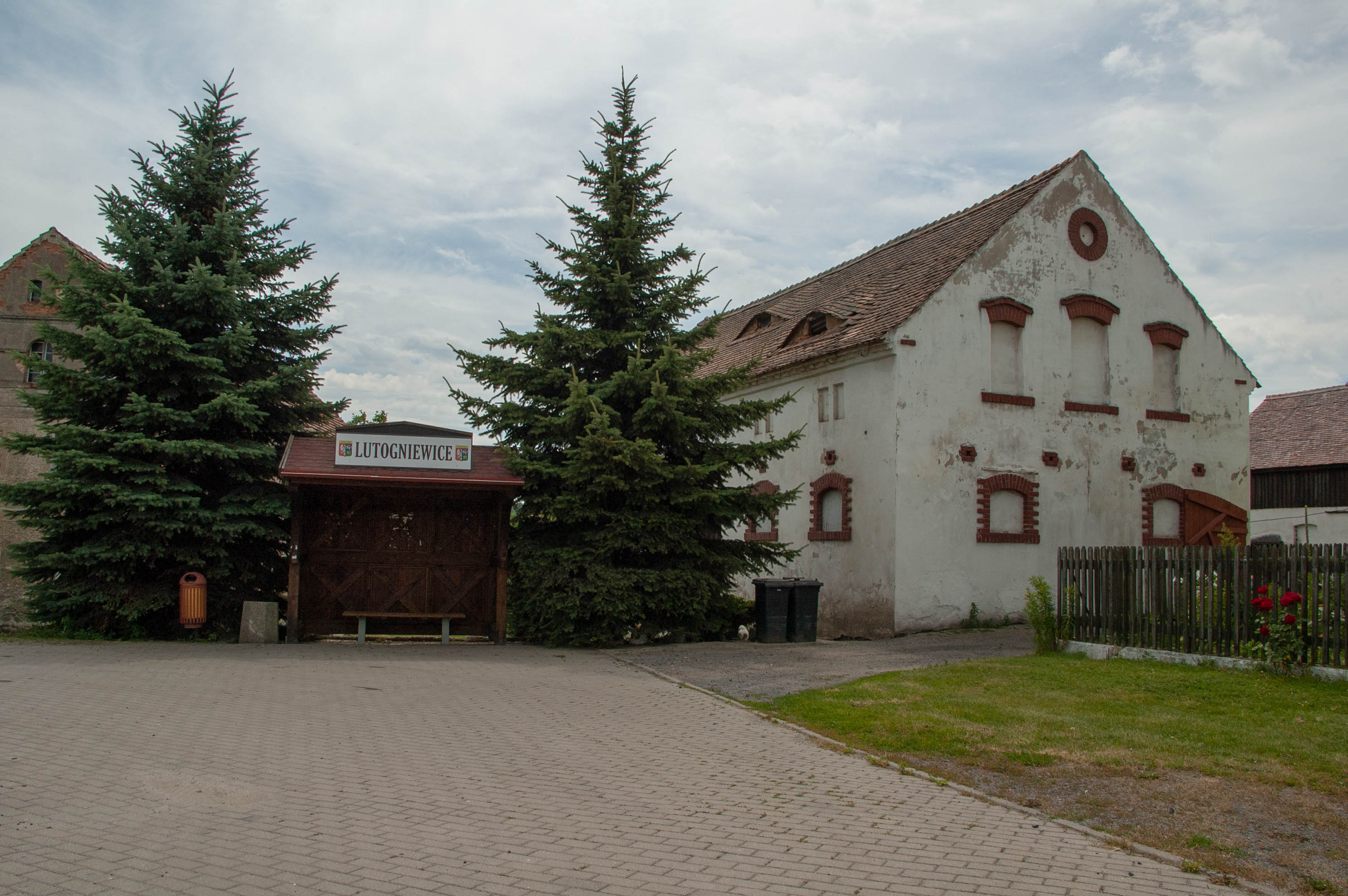
- Interactive map of Lutogniewice
- Location within Poland
- Coordinates: 51°00′29″N 14°58′3″E
- Country: Poland
- Voivodeship: Lower Silesian
- County: Zgorzelec
- Gmina: Bogatynia

Population
  - Total: 218
- Time zone: UTC+1 (CET)
  - Summer (DST): UTC+2 (CEST)
- Vehicle registration: DZG

Lutogniewice [lutɔɡɲɛˈvit͡sɛ] is a village in the administrative district of Gmina Bogatynia, within Zgorzelec County, Lower Silesian Voivodeship, in south-western Poland, close to the Czech and German borders.

== Gallery ==
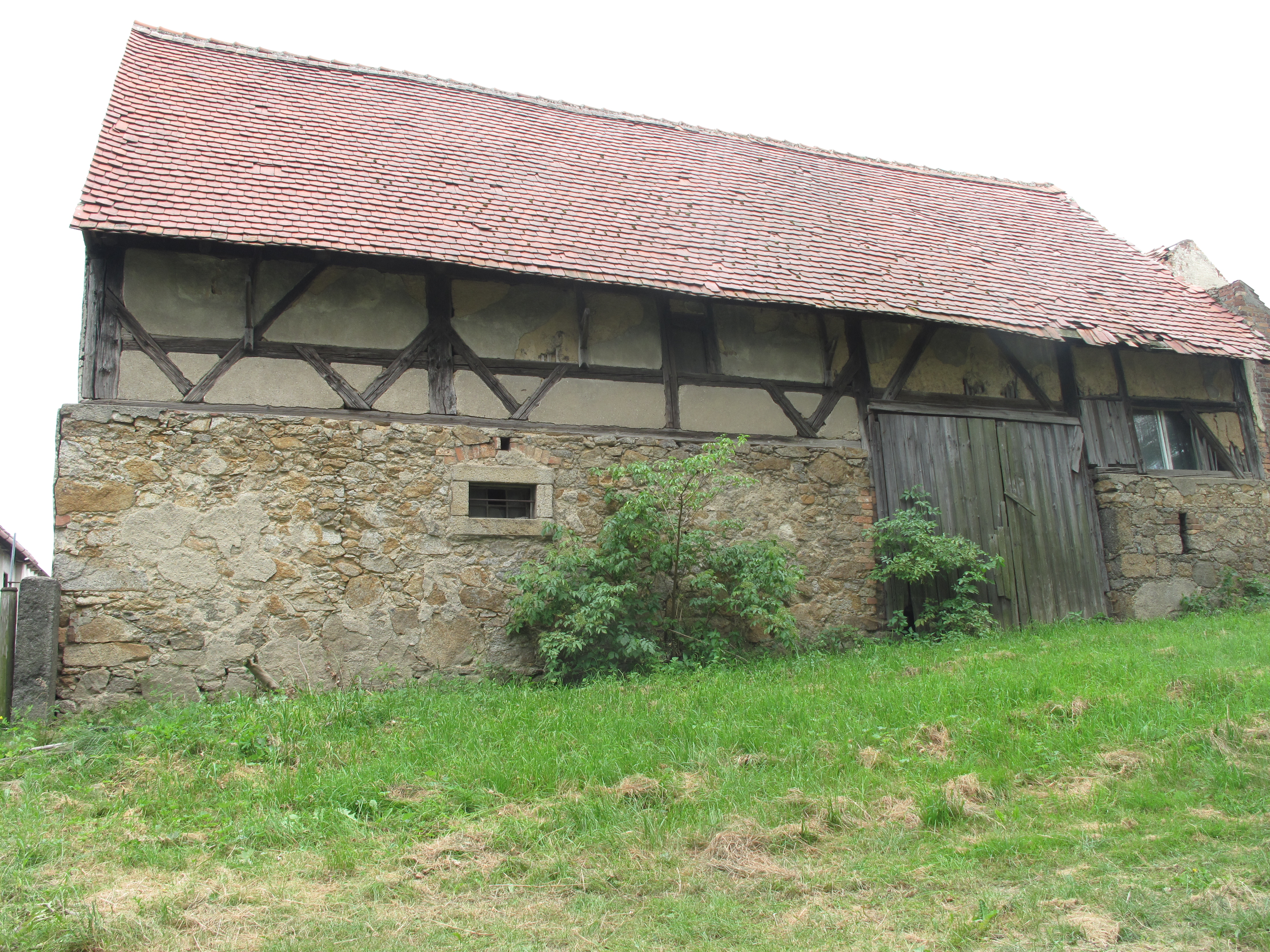
Barn

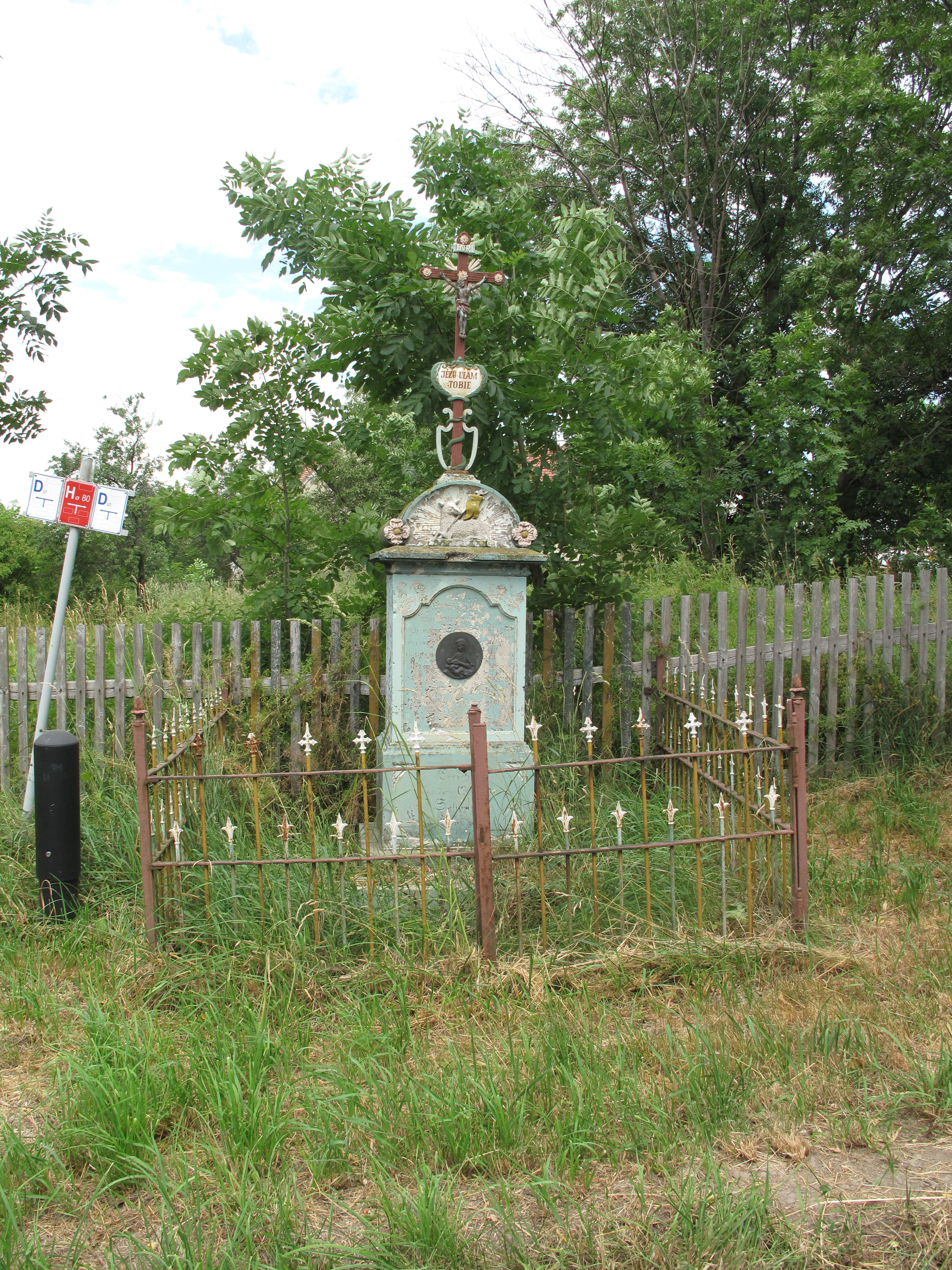
Wayside cross
