= Gmina Bogatynia =

Gmina Bogatynia Bogatynia Commune
- Gmina
- Flag Coat of arms
- Interactive map of Gmina Bogatynia
- Coordinates (Bogatynia): 50°55′N 14°58′E
- Country: Poland
- Voivodeship: Lower Silesian
- County: Zgorzelec
- Seat: Bogatynia

Area
  - Total: 136.17 km^{2} (52.58 sq mi)

Population (2019-06-30)
  - Total: 23,083
  - Density: 169.52/km^{2} (439.04/sq mi)
  - Urban: 17,436
  - Rural: 5,647
- Website: https://www.bogatynia.pl/

Gmina Bogatynia is an urban-rural gmina (administrative district) in Zgorzelec County, Lower Silesian Voivodeship, in south-western Poland, bordering both the Czech Republic and Germany. Its seat is the town of Bogatynia, which lies approximately 27 kilometres (17 mi) south of Zgorzelec, and 147 kilometres (91 mi) west of the regional capital Wrocław.

The gmina covers an area of 136.17 square kilometres (52.6 sq mi), and as of 2019 its total population is 23,083.

== Neighbouring gminas ==
Gmina Bogatynia is bordered by the town of Zawidów and the gmina of Zgorzelec. It also borders the Czech Republic and Germany.

== Villages ==
Apart from the town of Bogatynia, the gmina contains the villages of Białopole, Bratków, Działoszyn, Jasna Góra, Kopaczów, Krzewina, Lutogniewice, Opolno-Zdrój, Porajów, Posada, Rybarzowice, Sieniawka, Wolanów and Wyszków.

== Twin towns and sister cities ==
Gmina Bogatynia is twinned with:

- Hrádek nad Nisou, Czech Republic
- Zittau, Germany
