= Jasna Góra, Lower Silesian Voivodeship =

Jasna Góra
- Village
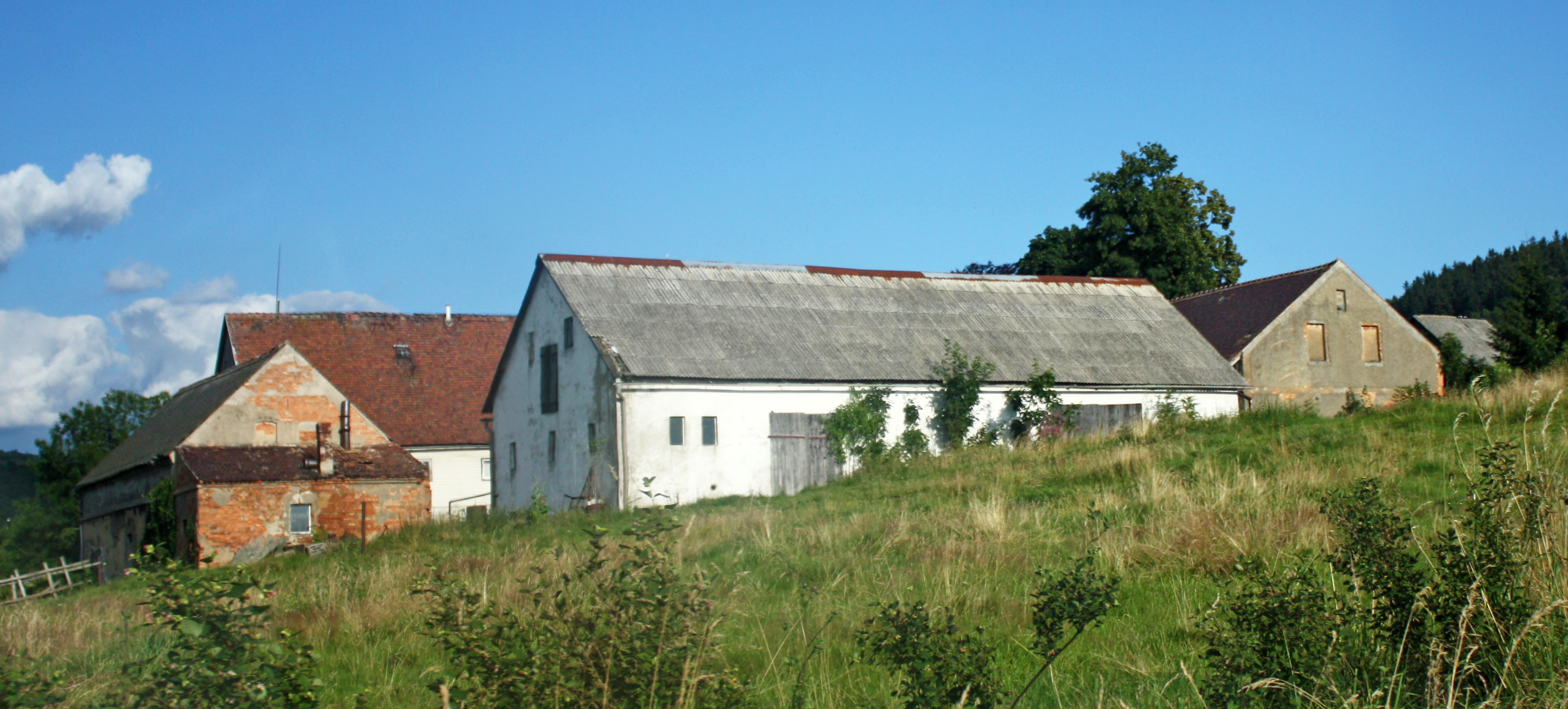
- Jasna Góra k. Bogatyni
- Interactive map of Jasna Góra
- Location within Poland
- Coordinates: 50°52′24″N 14°57′35″E
- Country: Poland
- Voivodeship: Lower Silesian
- County: Zgorzelec
- Gmina: Bogatynia
- Time zone: UTC+1 (CET)
  - Summer (DST): UTC+2 (CEST)
- Vehicle registration: DZG

Jasna Góra [ˈjasna ˈɡura] is a village in the administrative district of Gmina Bogatynia, within Zgorzelec County, Lower Silesian Voivodeship, in south-western Poland, close to the Czech and German borders.
