= Wyszków, Lower Silesian Voivodeship =

Wyszków
- Village
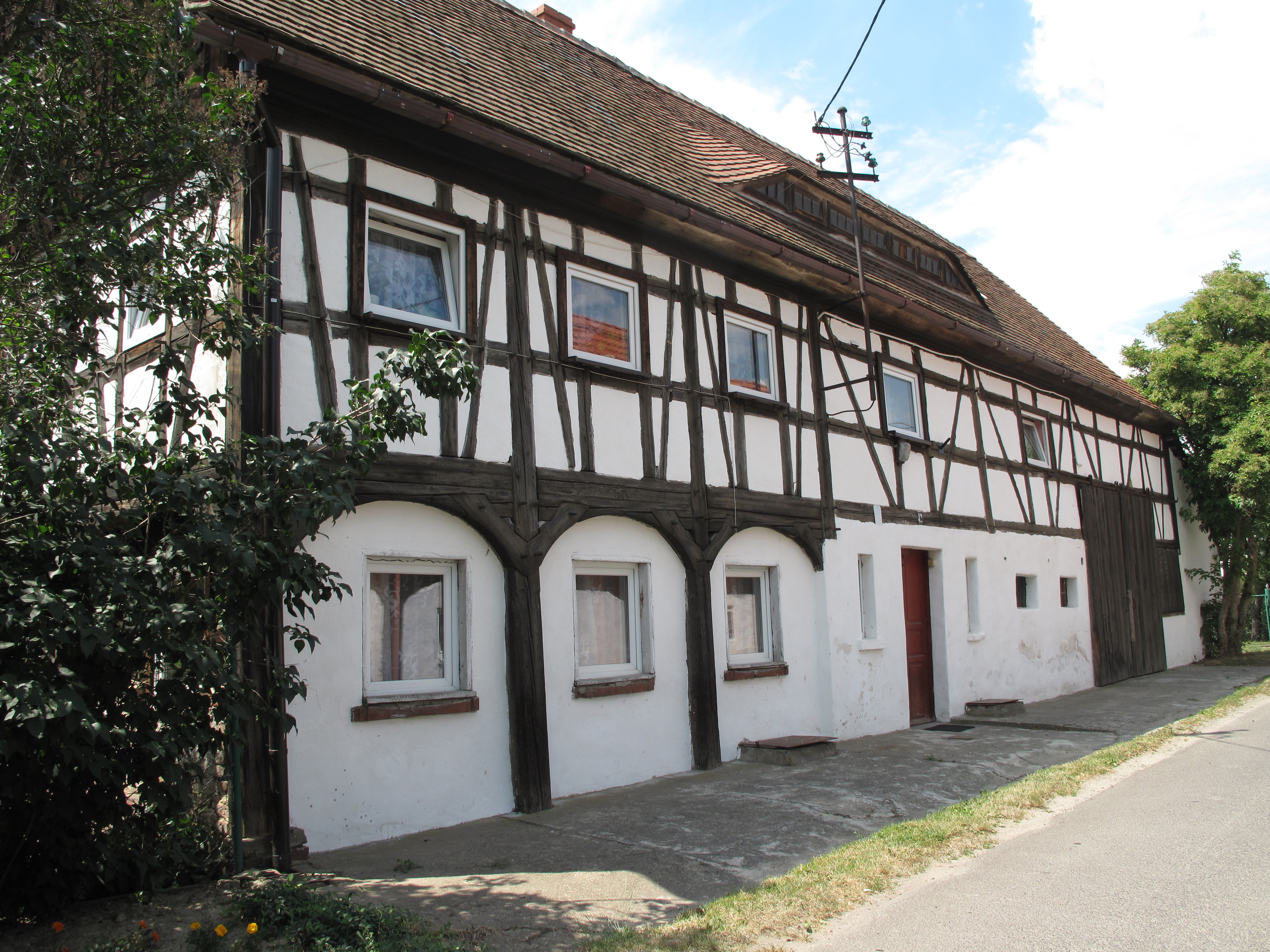
- Old half-timbered house in Wyszków

- Location within Poland
- Coordinates: 50°57′55″N 14°59′40″E
- Country: Poland
- Voivodeship: Lower Silesian
- County: Zgorzelec
- Gmina: Bogatynia
- Population: 170
- Time zone: UTC+1 (CET)
  - Summer (DST): UTC+2 (CEST)
- Vehicle registration: DZG

Wyszków [ˈvɨʂkuf] is a village in the administrative district of Gmina Bogatynia, within Zgorzelec County, Lower Silesian Voivodeship, in south-western Poland, close to the Czech and German borders.

== History ==
In the Early Middle Ages, the territory was inhabited by the Bieżuńczanie tribe, one of the Polish tribes. Since the 11th century, it was under Polish, Czech, Hungarian and Saxon rule, and stayed part of various German states until 1945. After the defeat of Germany in World War II in 1945, it became again part of Poland.

== Gallery ==
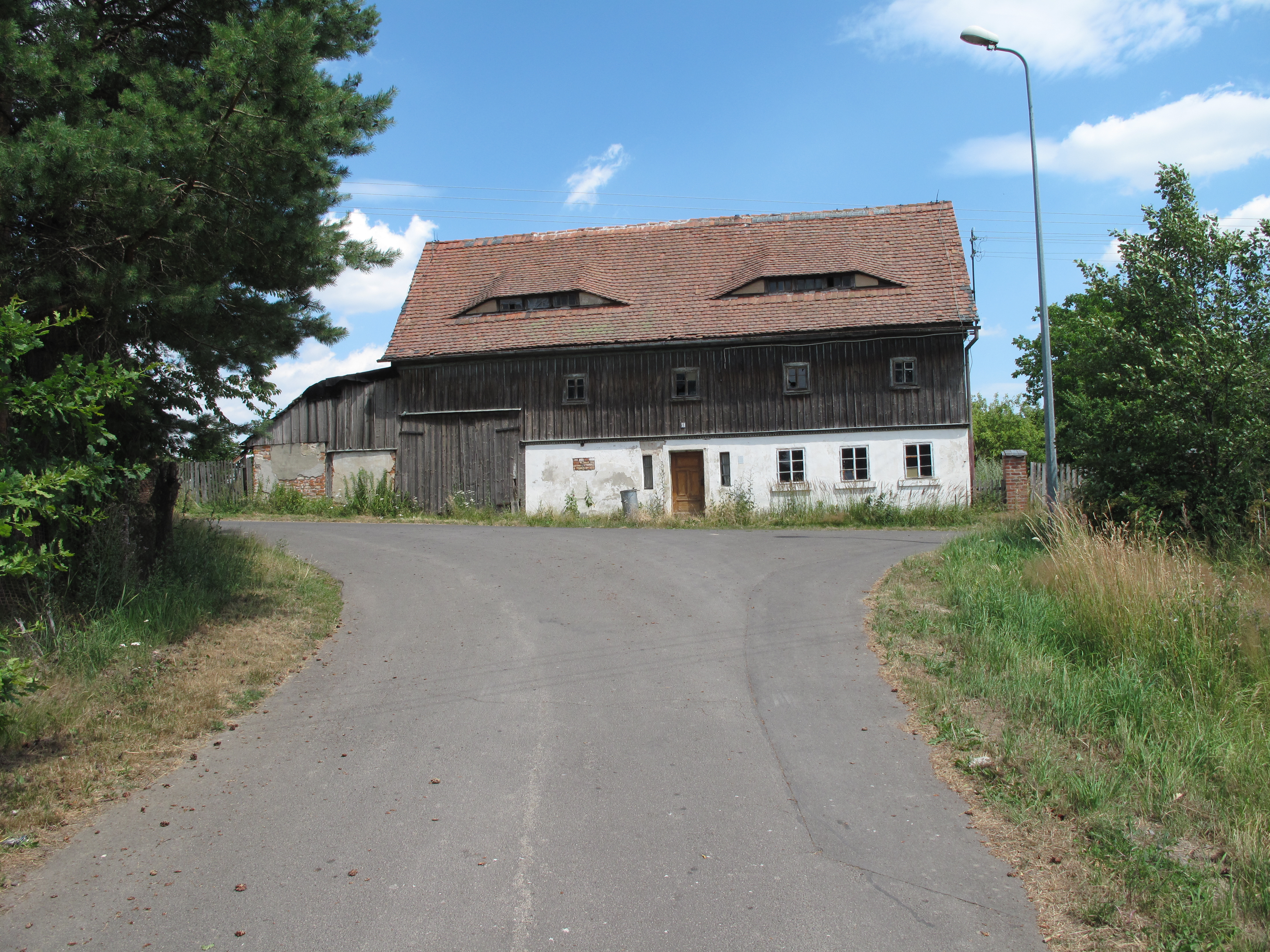

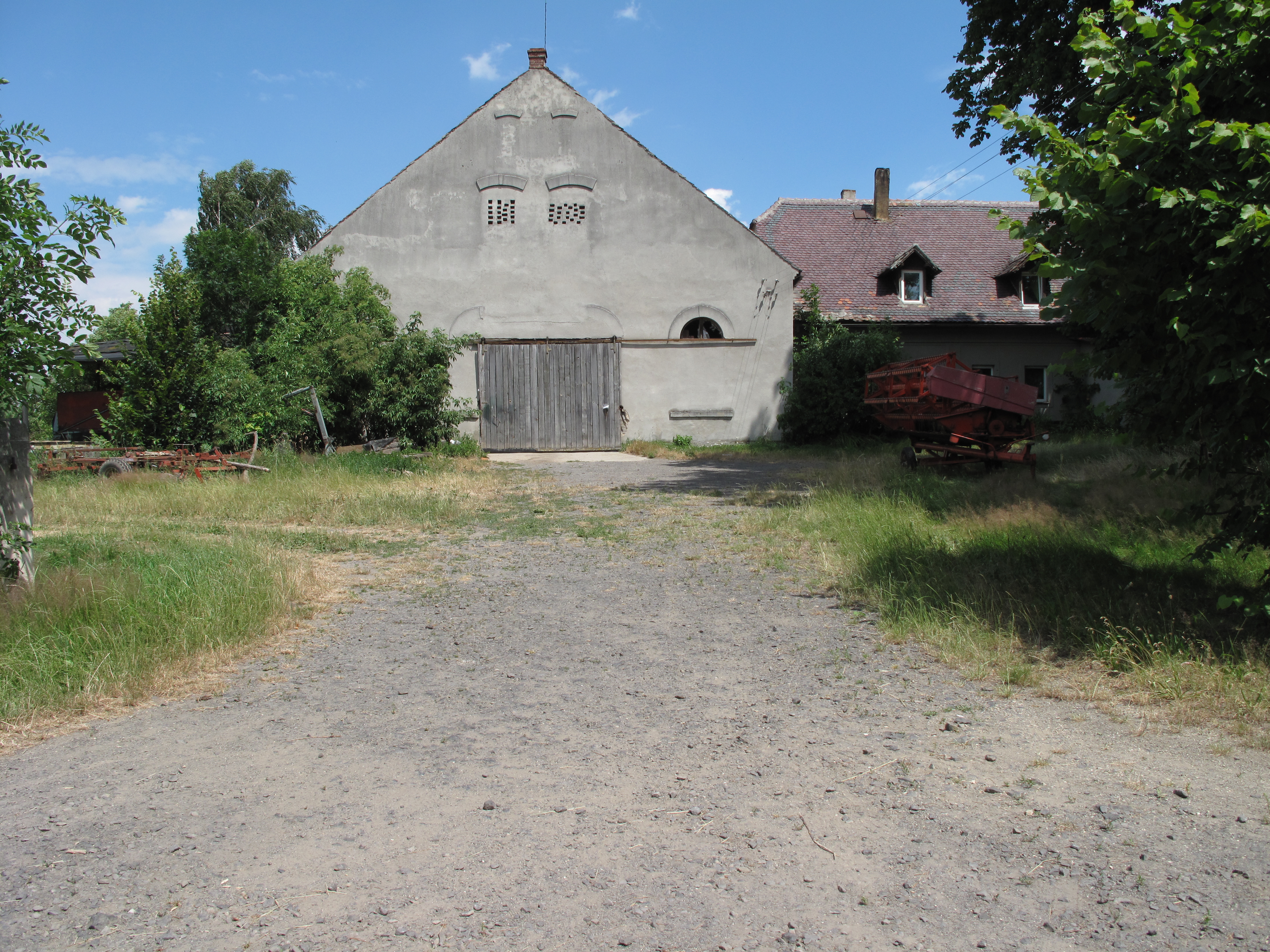

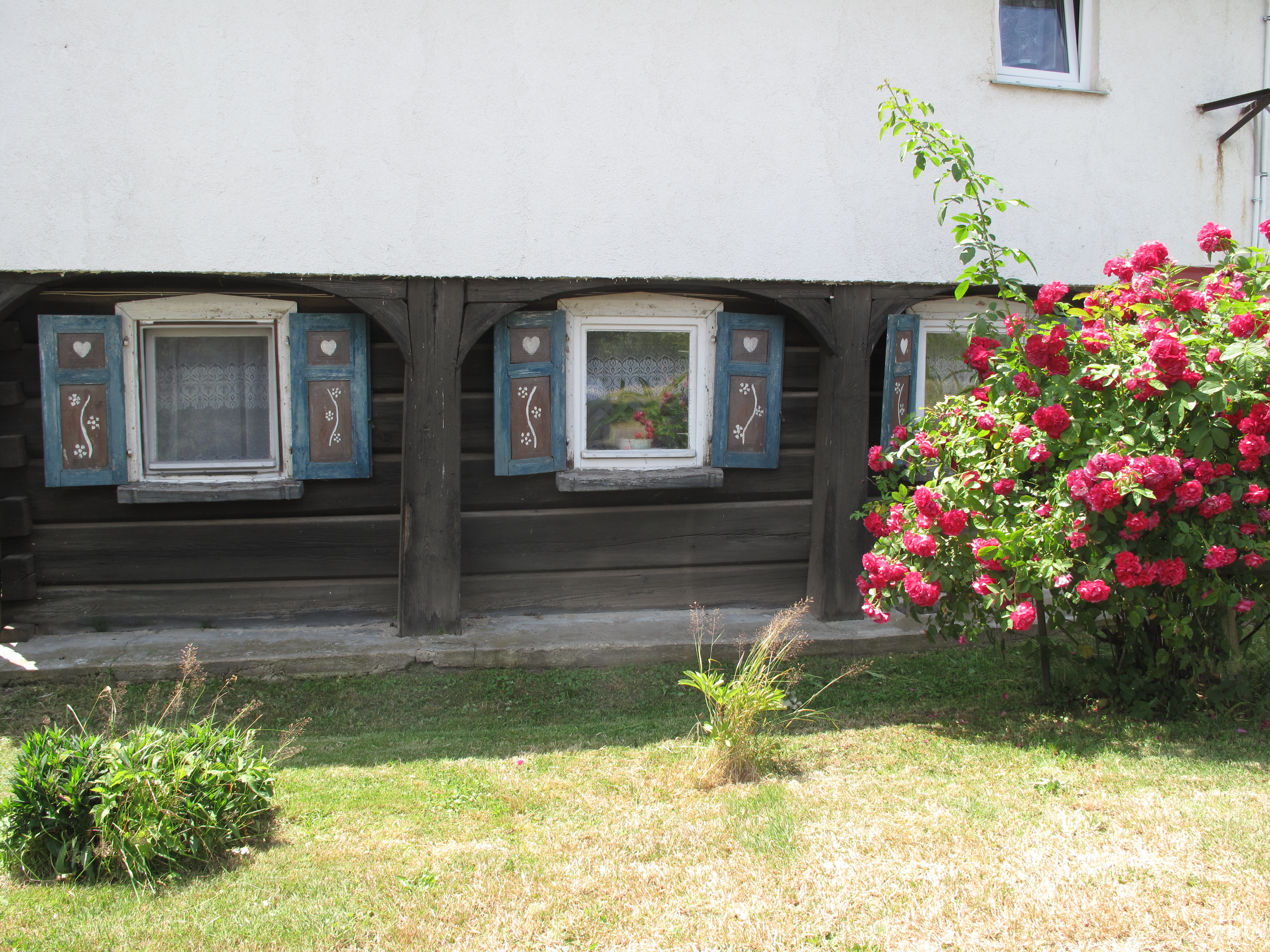
