= Działoszyn, Lower Silesian Voivodeship =

Działoszyn
- Village
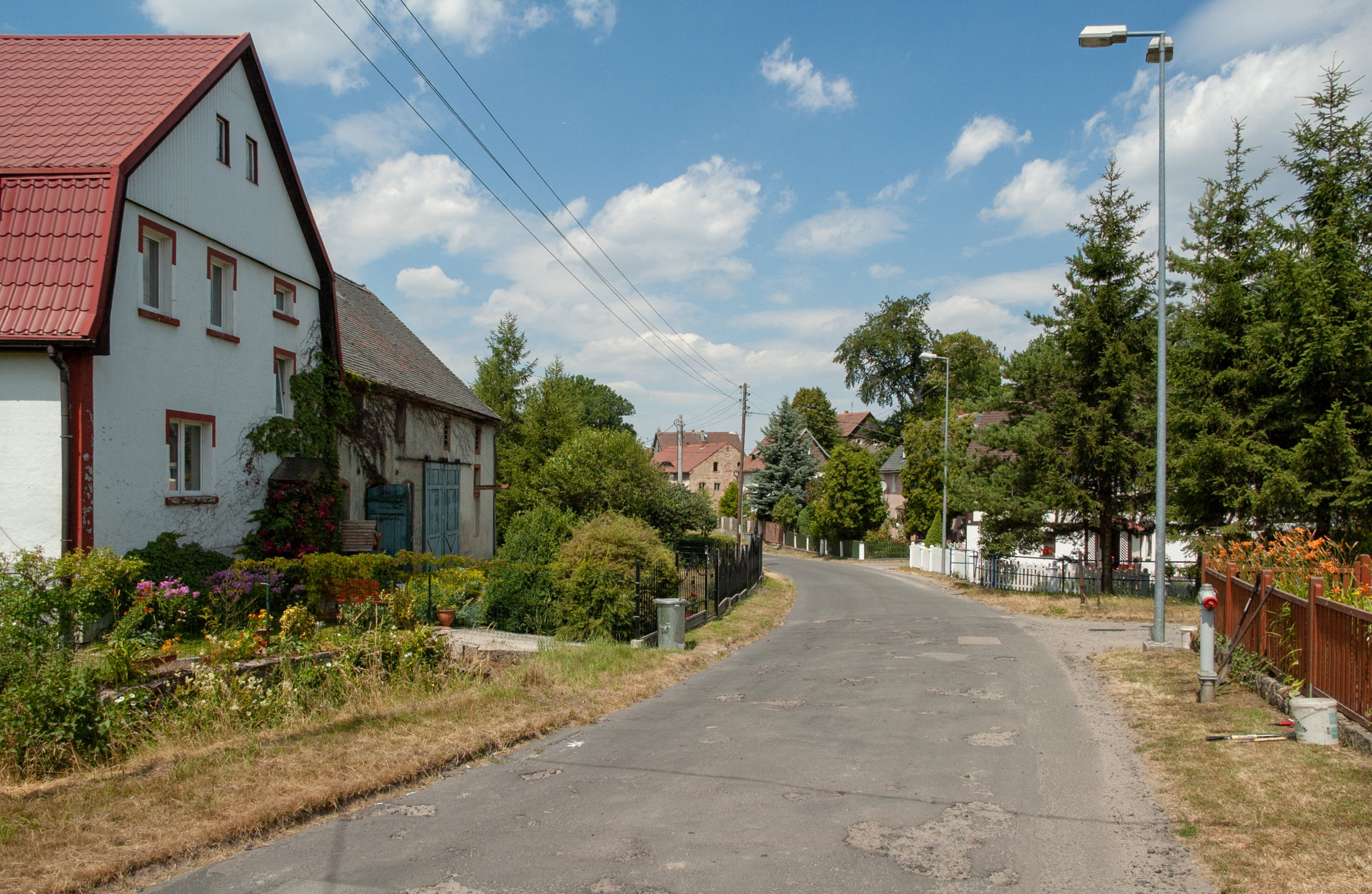
- Interactive map of Działoszyn
- Location within Poland
- Coordinates: 50°58′40″N 14°56′56″E
- Country: Poland
- Voivodeship: Lower Silesian
- County: Zgorzelec
- Gmina: Bogatynia
- Time zone: UTC+1 (CET)
  - Summer (DST): UTC+2 (CEST)
- Vehicle registration: DZG

Działoszyn [d͡ʑaˈwɔʂɨn] (German: Königshain; Upper Sorbian: Dźěłošyn) is a village in the administrative district of Gmina Bogatynia, within Zgorzelec County, Lower Silesian Voivodeship, in south-western Poland, close to the Czech and German borders.

== History ==
In the Early Middle Ages, the territory was inhabited by the Bieżuńczanie tribe, one of the Polish tribes. Since the 11th century, it was under Polish, Czech, Hungarian and Saxon rule, and from 1871 to 1945 it was also part of Germany. After the defeat of Germany in World War II in 1945, it became again part of Poland.

== Gallery ==
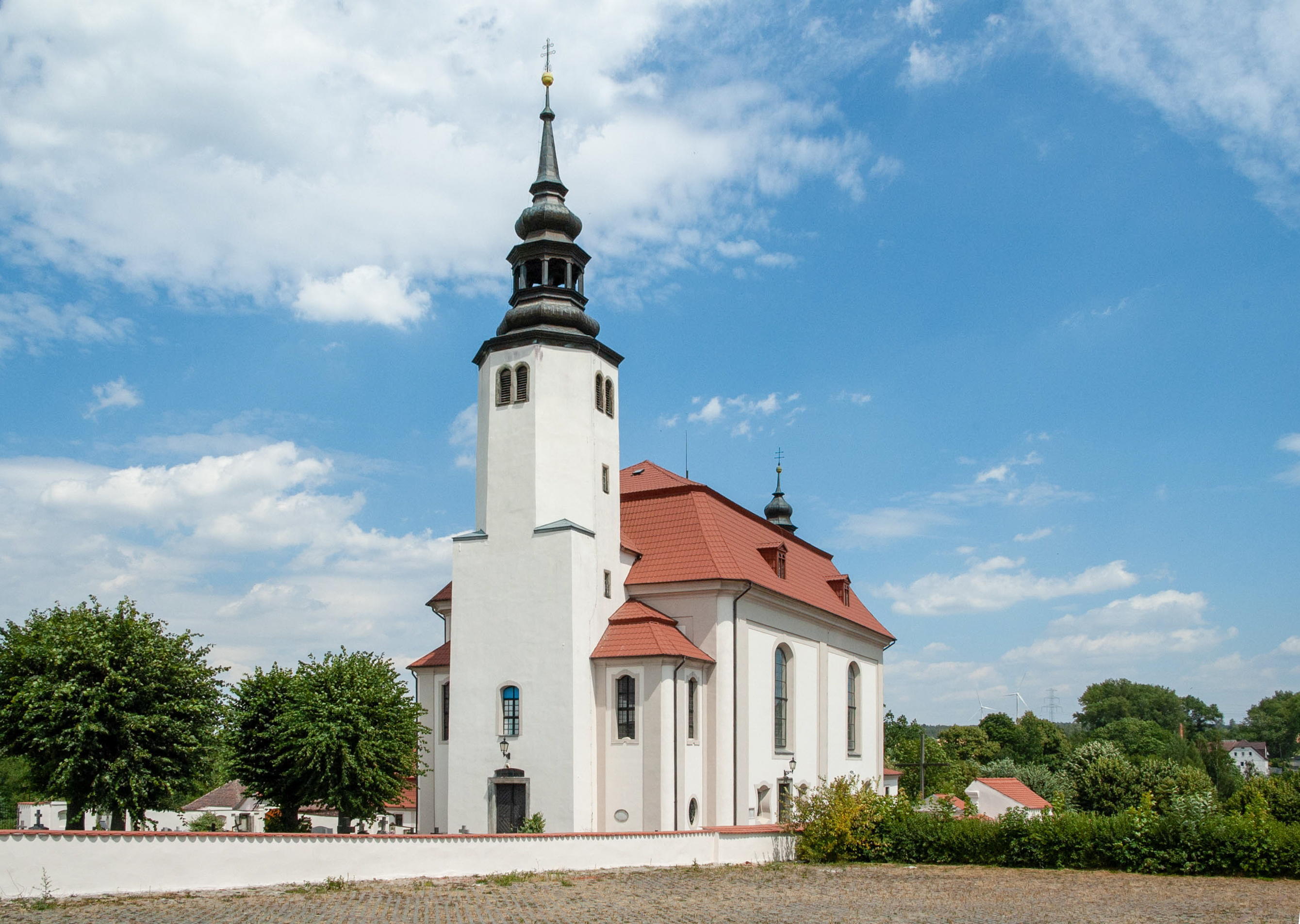
Saint Bartholomew church

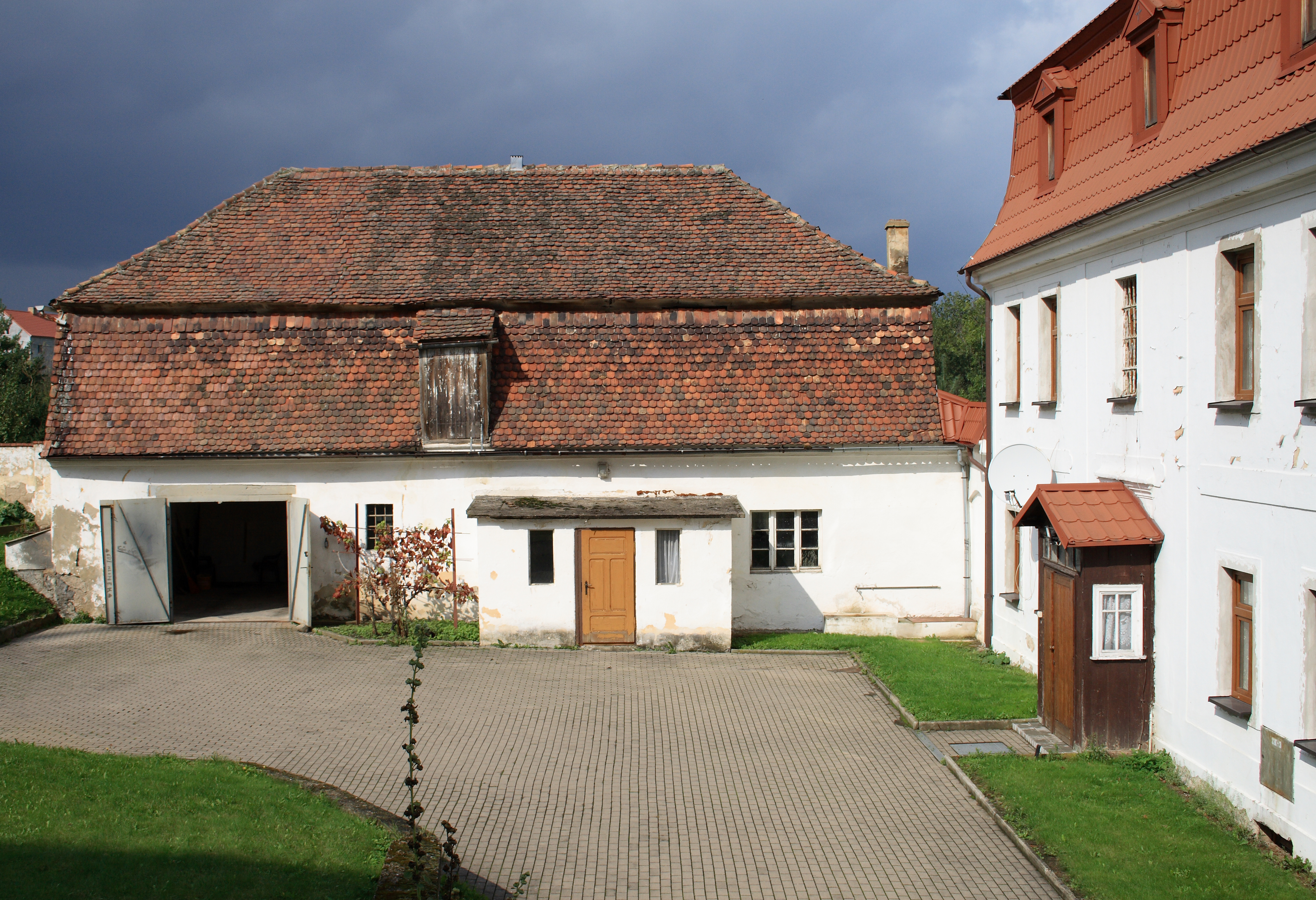
Parish house

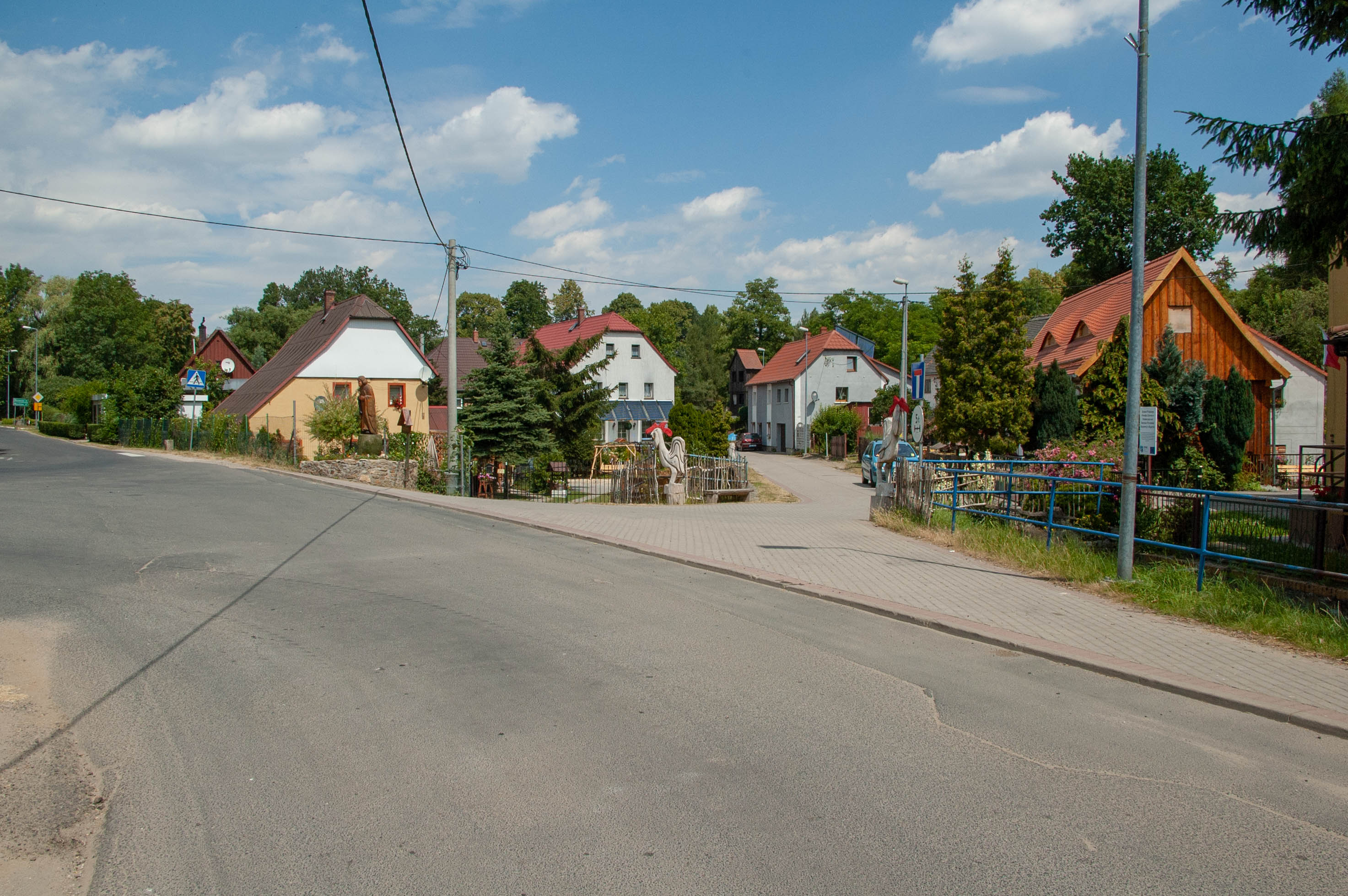
A road

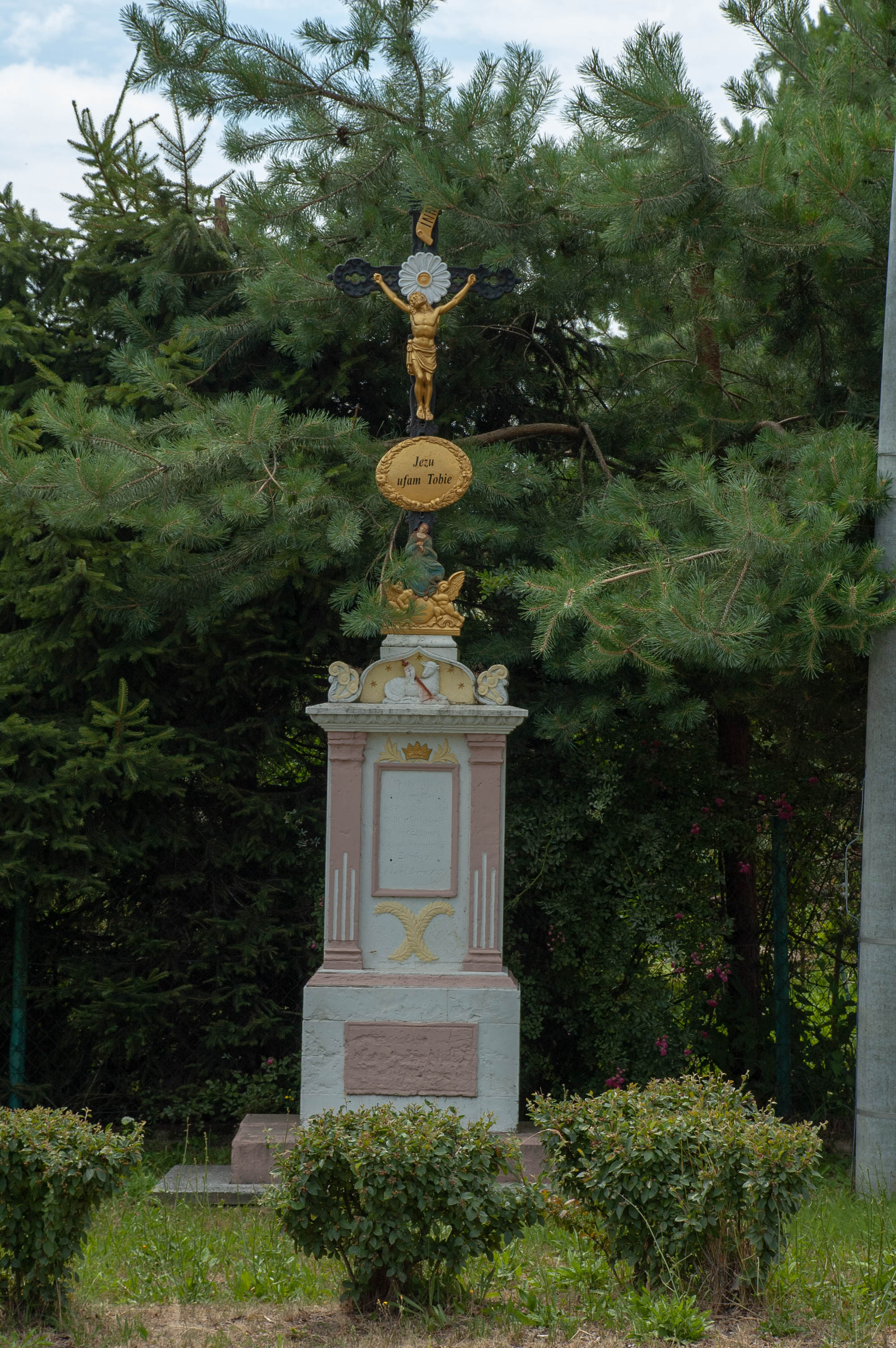
Wayside shrine
