= Białopole, Lower Silesian Voivodeship =

Białopole
- Village
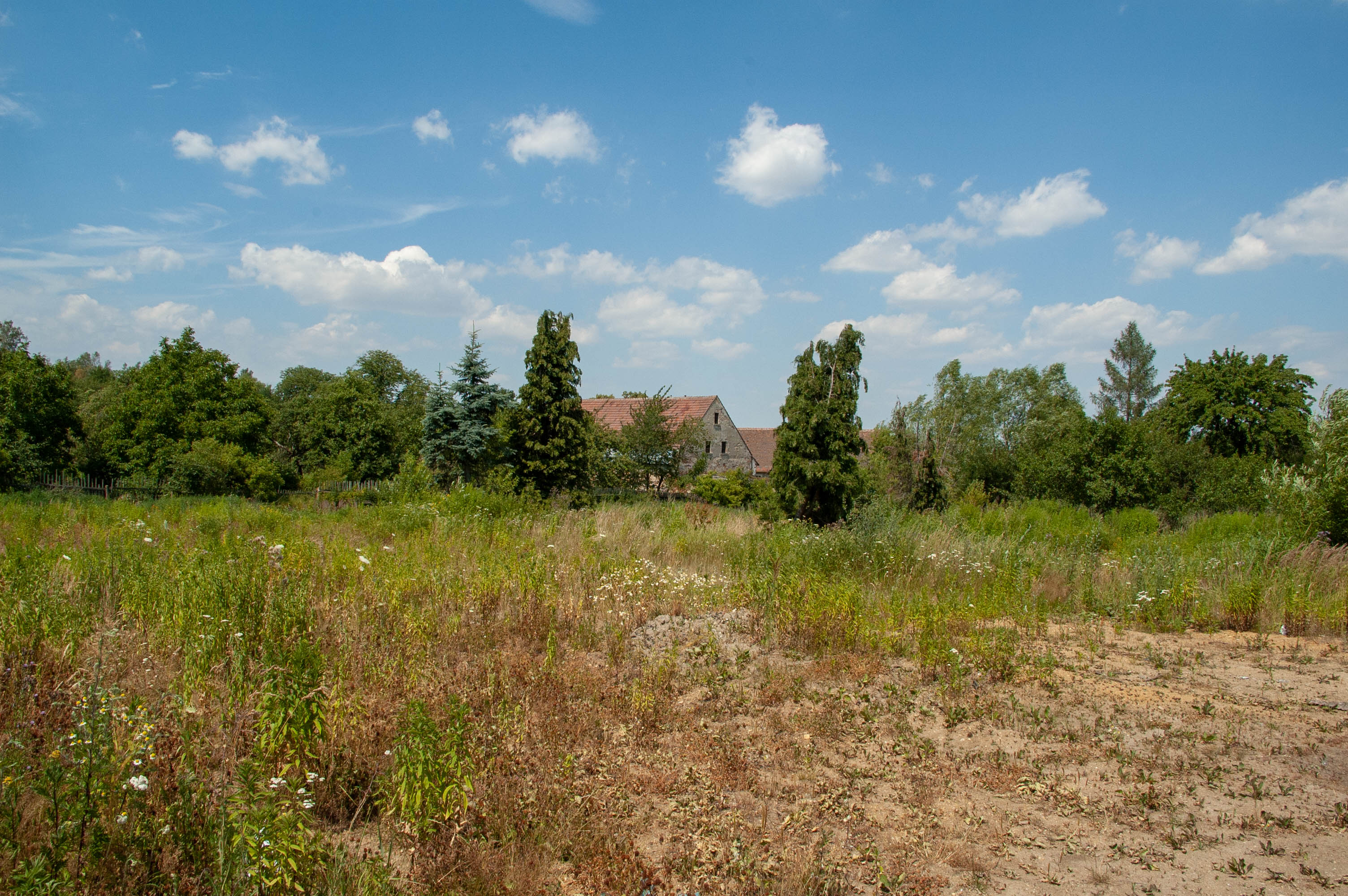
- House in Białopole in 2019
- Interactive map of Białopole
- Location within Poland
- Coordinates: 50°52′49″N 14°54′04″E
- Country: Poland
- Voivodeship: Lower Silesian
- County: Zgorzelec
- Gmina: Bogatynia

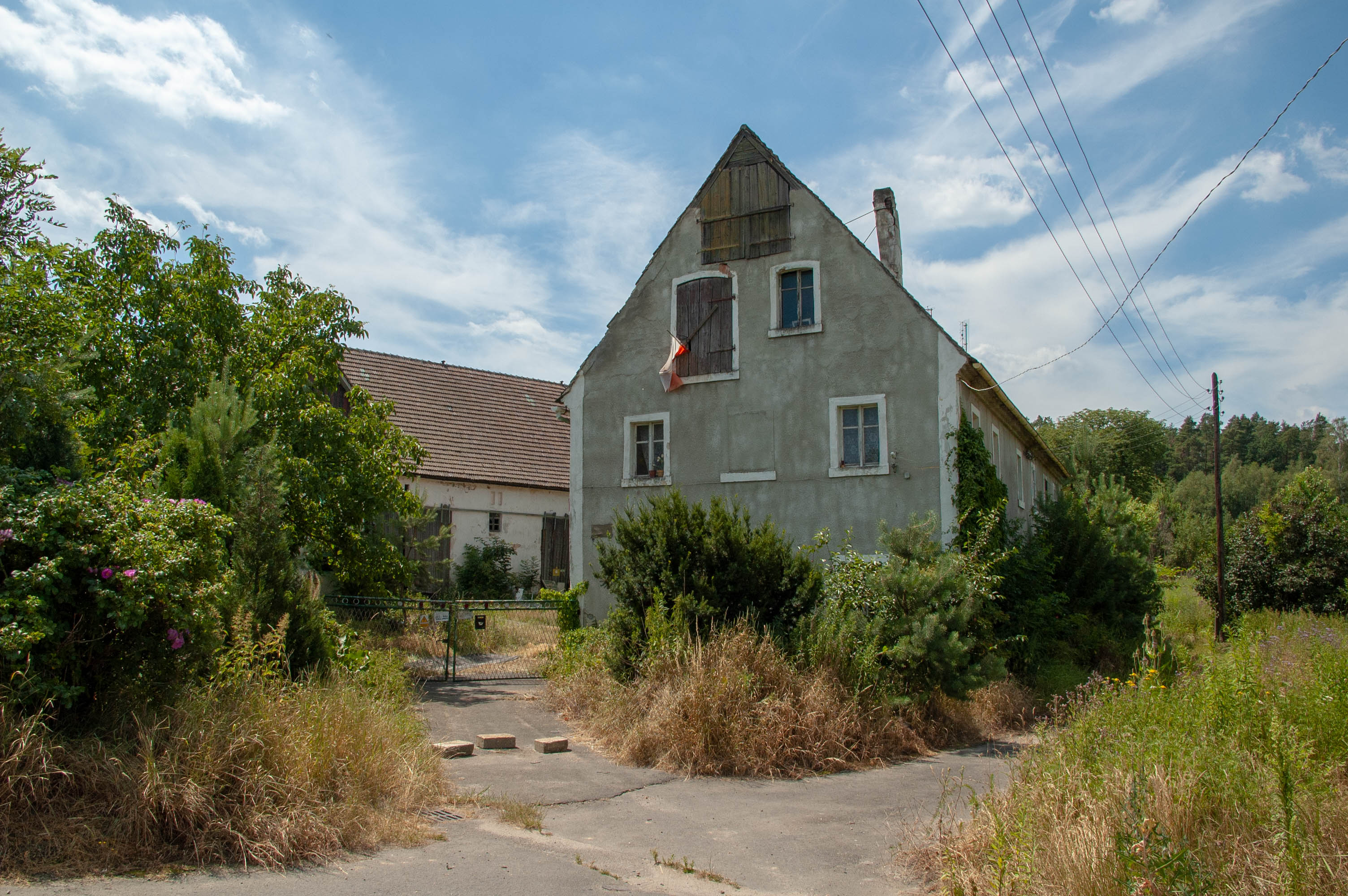
A house in Białopole

Białopole [bjawɔˈpɔlɛ] (Upper Sorbian: Běłopole) is a village in the administrative district of Gmina Bogatynia, within Zgorzelec County, Lower Silesian Voivodeship, in south-western Poland, close to the Czech and German borders.
