= Wolanów, Lower Silesian Voivodeship =

Wolanów
- Village
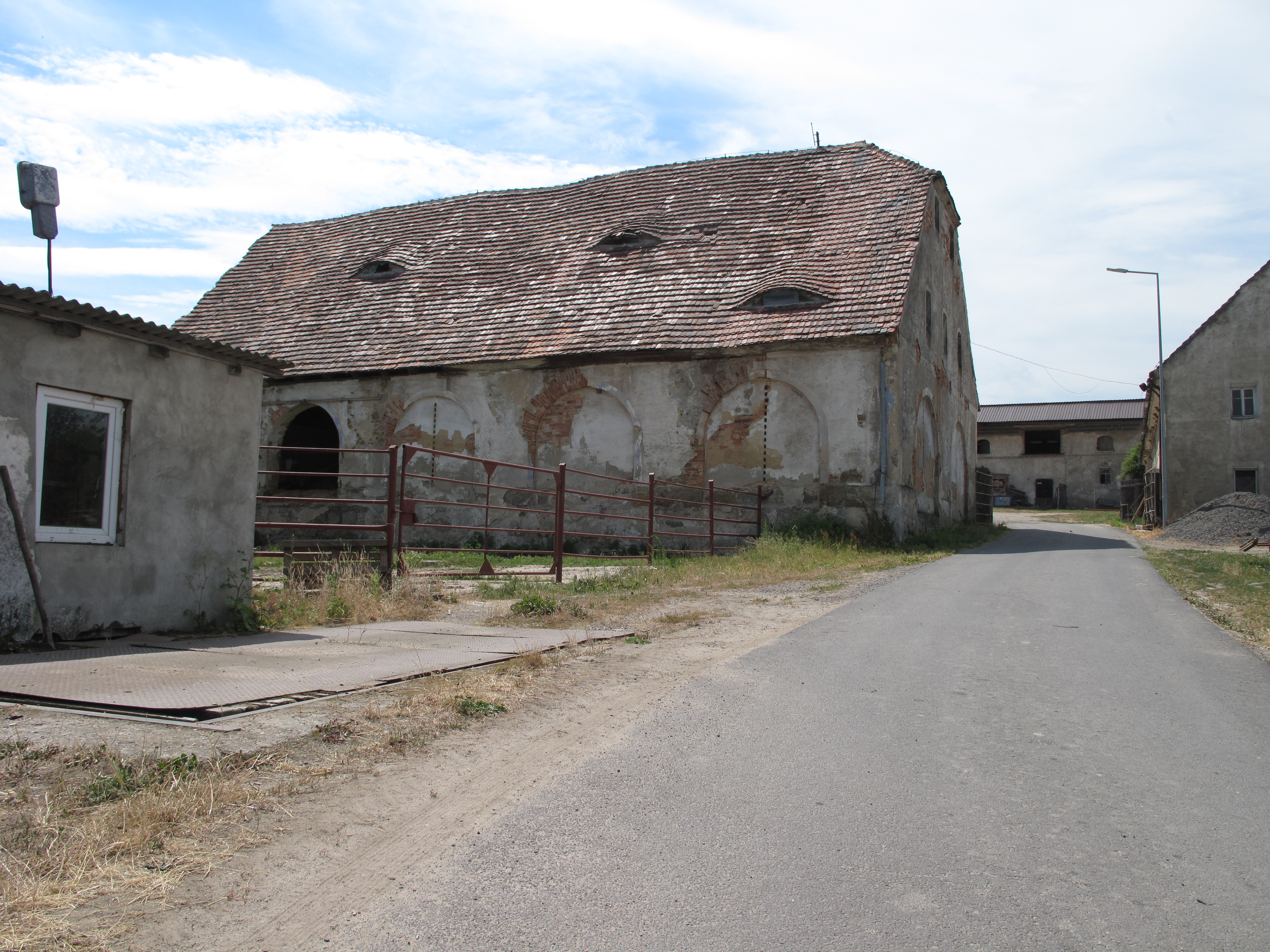
- The biggest farm
- Interactive map of Wolanów
- Location within Poland
- Coordinates: 50°58′34.68″N 15°0′16.56″E
- Country: Poland
- Voivodeship: Lower Silesian
- County: Zgorzelec
- Gmina: Bogatynia

Wolanów [vɔˈlanuf] (Upper Sorbian: Wolanow) is a village in the administrative district of Gmina Bogatynia, within Zgorzelec County, Lower Silesian Voivodeship, in south-western Poland, close to the Czech and German borders.

== Gallery ==
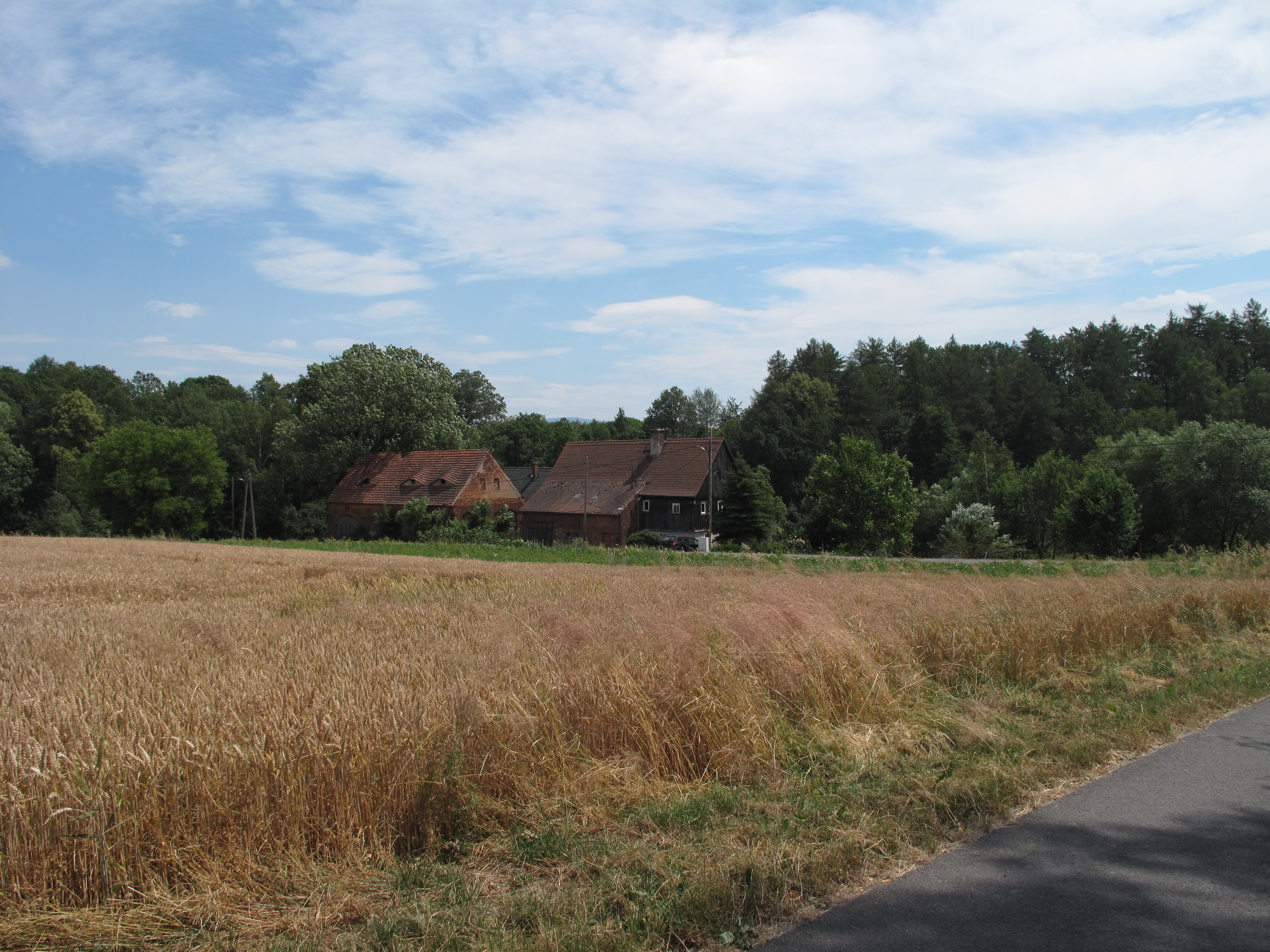
Field and houses

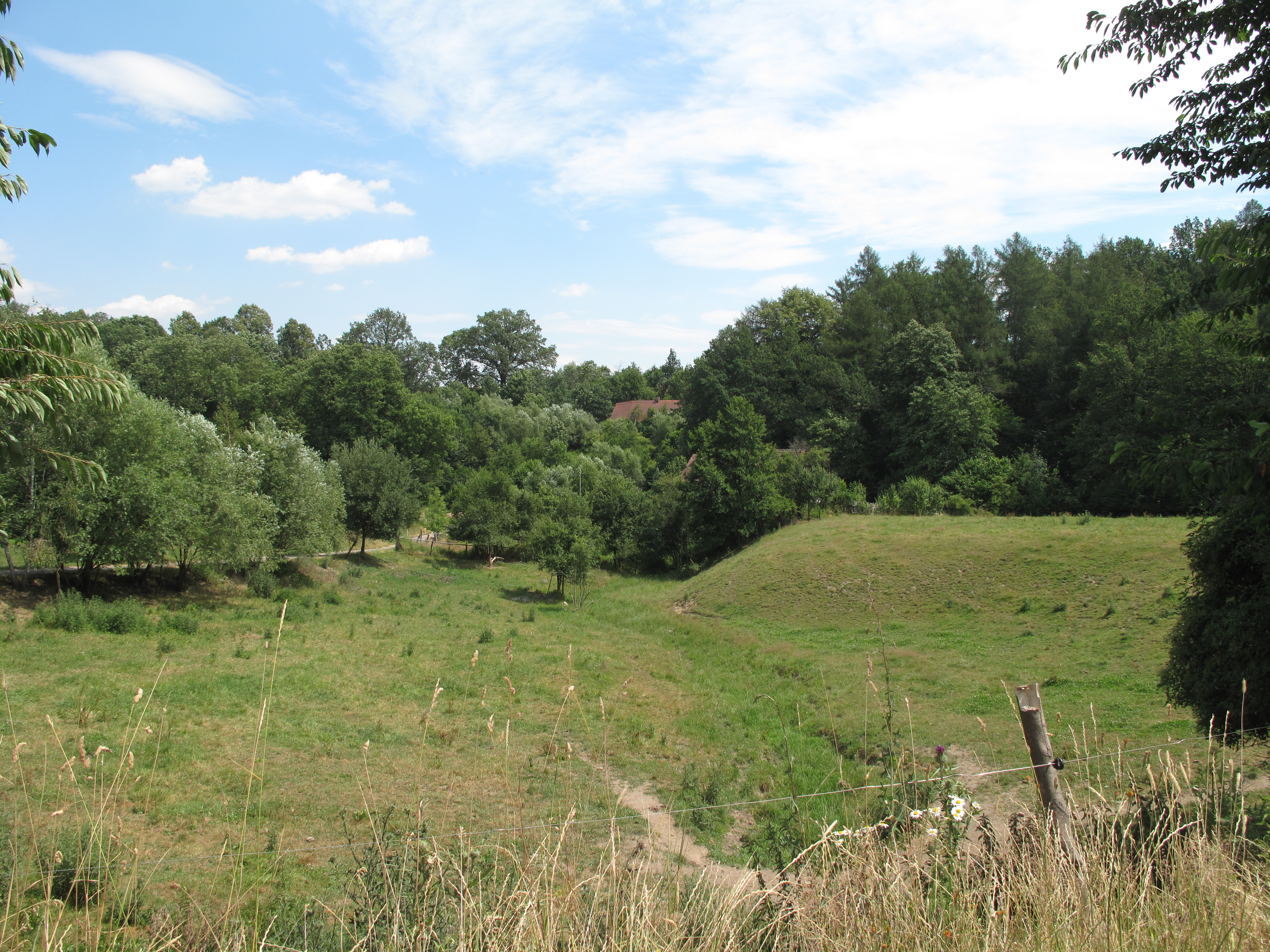
Garden

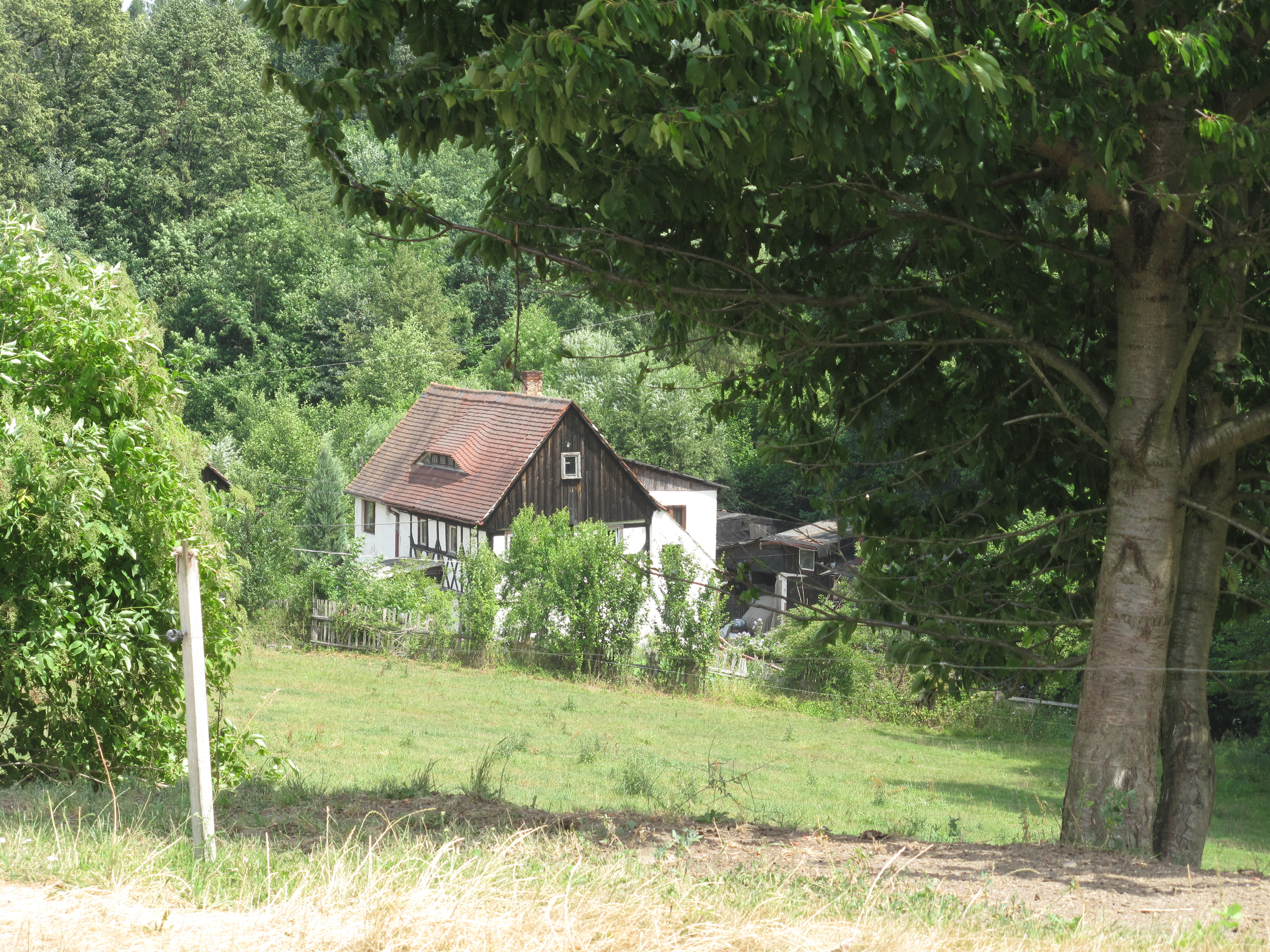
Half-timbered house
