= Hrádek nad Nisou =

- Town
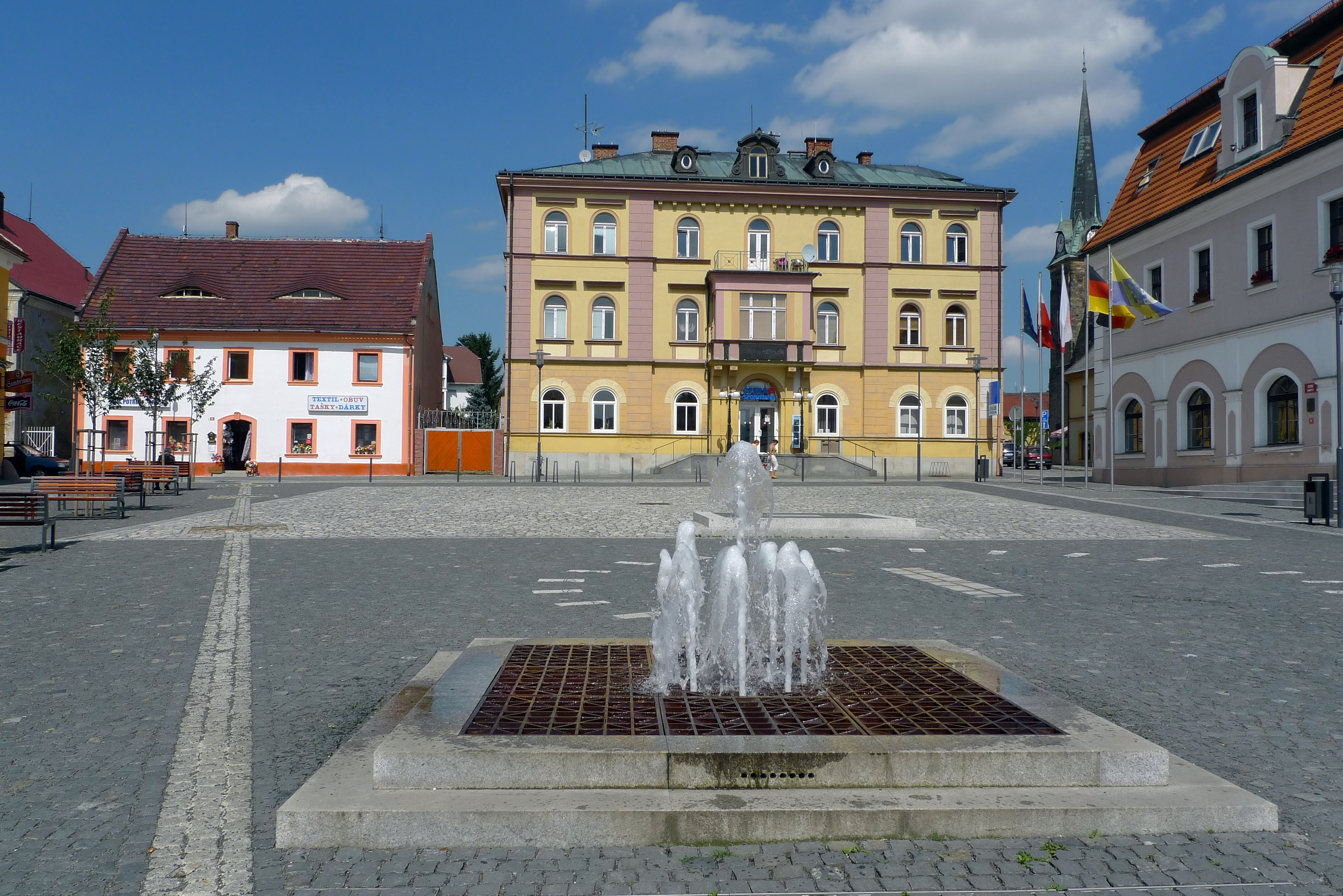
- The square Horní náměstí

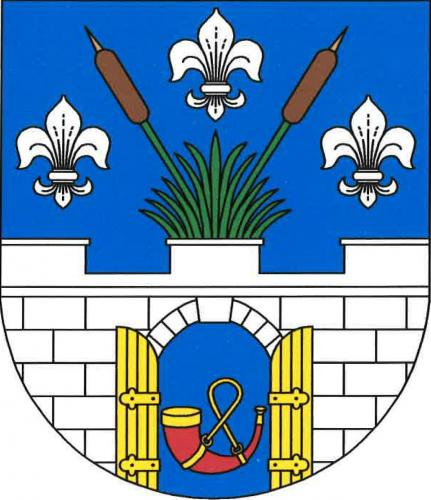
- Flag Coat of arms

- Location in the Czech Republic
- Coordinates: 50°51′10″N 14°50′40″E
- Country: Czech Republic
- Region: Liberec
- District: Liberec
- First mentioned: 1287

Government
  - Mayor: Martin Půta (SLK)

Area
  - Total: 48.55 km^{2} (18.75 sq mi)
- Elevation: 255 m (837 ft)

Population (2026-01-01)
  - Total: 8,009
  - Density: 165.0/km^{2} (427.3/sq mi)
- Time zone: UTC+1 (CET)
  - Summer (DST): UTC+2 (CEST)
- Postal code: 463 34
- Website: www.hradek.eu

Hrádek nad Nisou (Czech pronunciation: [ˈɦraːdɛk ˈnad ɲɪsou]; German: Grottau) is a town in Liberec District in the Liberec Region of the Czech Republic. It has about 8,000 inhabitants. The town is located on the Lusatian Neisse River near the state border, at the tripoint of the Czech Republic, Germany and Poland. The historic town centre is well preserved and is protected as an urban monument zone.

== Administrative division ==
Hrádek nad Nisou consists of nine municipal parts (in brackets population according to the 2021 census):

- Hrádek nad Nisou (4,365)
- Dolní Sedlo (164)
- Dolní Suchá (267)
- Donín (1,100)
- Horní Sedlo (30)
- Loučná (993)
- Oldřichov na Hranicích (219)
- Uhelná (51)
- Václavice (422)

== Etymology ==
The oldest forms of the name are Grad, Grat (in modern Czech hrad; meaning 'castle'). The name Hrádek (diminutive of hrad) has been used since the 16th century.

== Geography ==
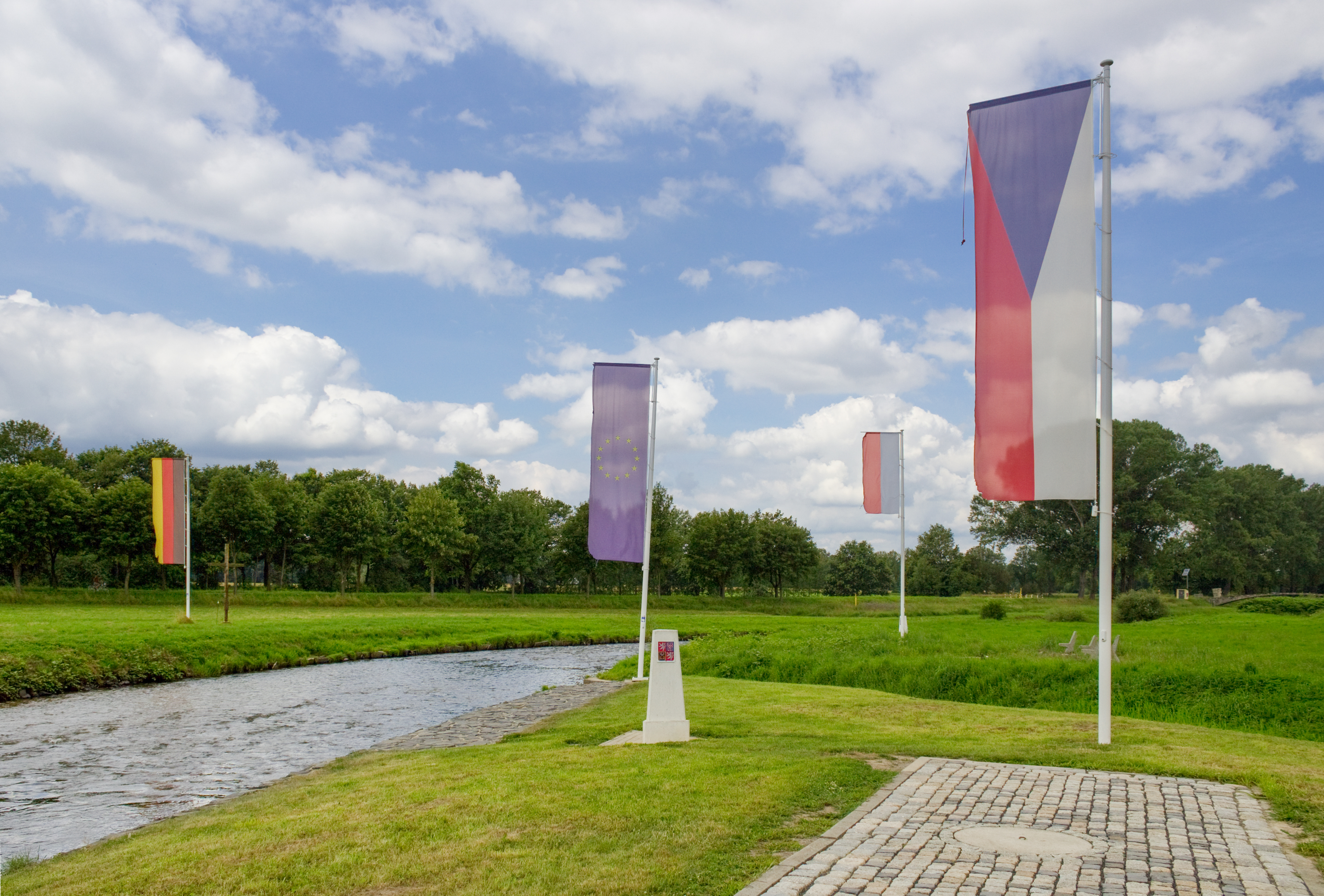
Tripoint of the Czech Republic, Germany and Poland

Hrádek nad Nisou is located about 17 kilometres (11 mi) northwest of Liberec. It is located on the state border, at the tripoint of the Czech Republic, Germany and Poland. The municipal territory lies mostly in the Zittau Basin, but on the south it also extends to the Lusatian Mountains and Ještěd–Kozákov Ridge. The highest point is the hill Popova skála at 565 m (1,854 ft) above sea level. The Lusatian Neisse River flows through the town.

== History ==
The first written mention of Hrádek nad Nisou is from 1287. During the Hussite Wars, in 1424, the town was burned down. In 1466, the former church was replaced by a Gothic one. In the second half of the 16th century, there was a great development of the estate.

In the 19th century, Hrádek nad Nisou became industrialised. The railway was built in 1859. Engineering, chemical and textile factories were established. From the 19th century until 1972, lignite was mined in the vicinity of the town.

The town had a German majority. The Czech school was founded in 1925. From 1938 to 1945 it was annexed by Nazi Germany and administered as part of the Reichsgau Sudetenland. The German-speaking population was expelled after World War II.

== Demographics ==
Historical population

Year	Pop.	±%
1869	7,497	—
1880	9,502	+26.7%
1890	11,094	+16.8%
1900	12,689	+14.4%
1910	13,681	+7.8%

Year	Pop.	±%
1921	11,920	−12.9%
1930	12,421	+4.2%
1950	6,960	−44.0%
1961	7,492	+7.6%
1970	7,581	+1.2%

Year	Pop.	±%
1980	7,836	+3.4%
1991	7,112	−9.2%
2001	7,277	+2.3%
2011	7,493	+3.0%
2021	7,611	+1.6%

Source: Censuses

== Economy ==
The town benefits from its location near Germany and Poland. There is an industrial zone dominated by factories focused on the production of automotive parts. The largest company is Drylock Technologies, a manufacturer of diapers and other hygiene needs.

== Transport ==
Hrádek nad Nisou lies on the railway line heading from Liberec to Zittau and continuing to Varnsdorf or Dresden.

== Sights ==
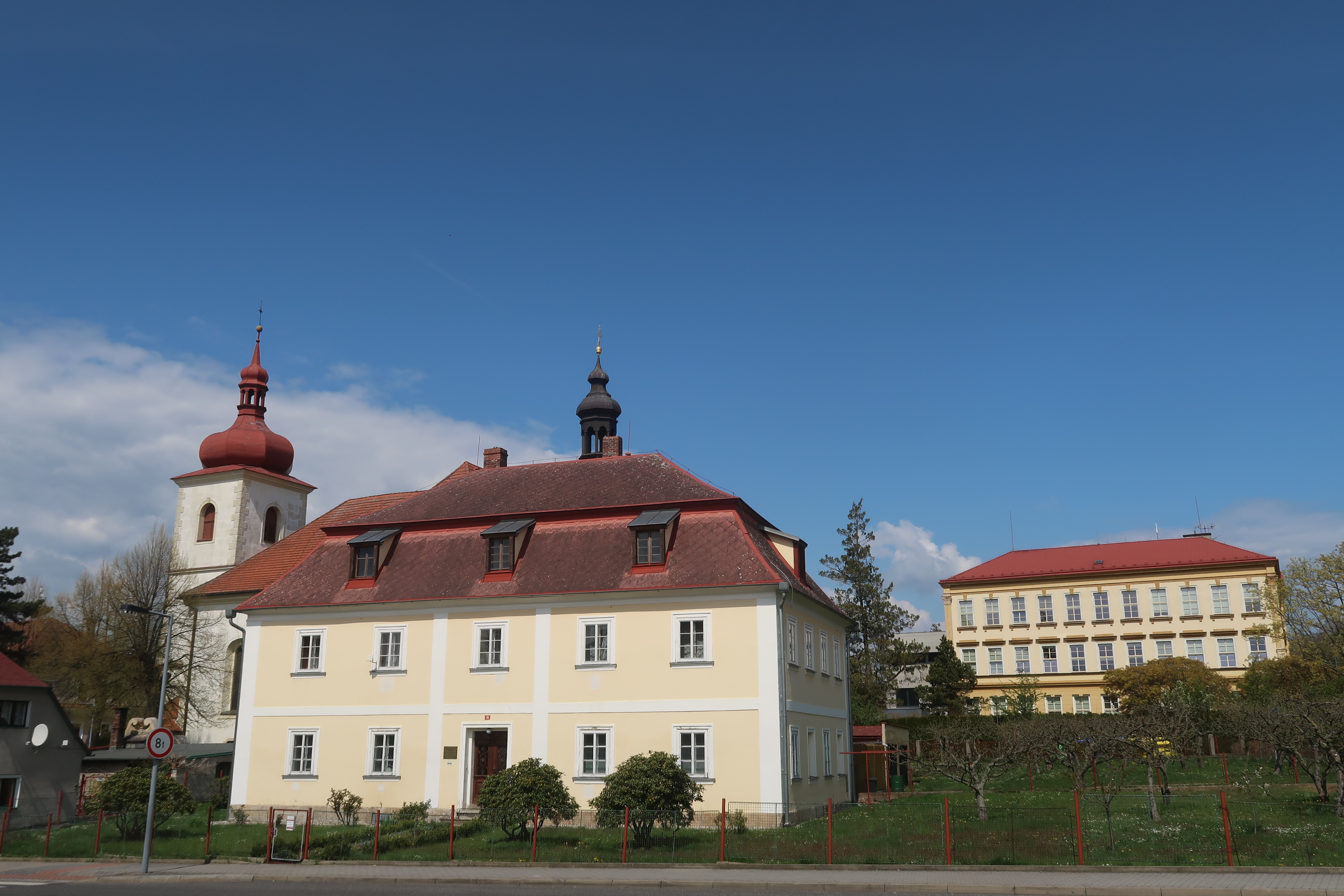
Church of Saint Bartholomew, its rectory and a school

Hrádek nad Nisou has a well preserved town centre with many historic houses, protected as an urban monument zone. The most valuable building is the Church of Saint Bartholomew. It was built in 1466 on the site of a church from the 13th century. In 1566, it was rebuilt in the Renaissance style. Its current Baroque appearance is from 1764.

The Church of Peace was built in 1900–1901 by the Lutherans. Today it is used by the Czechoslovak Hussite Church.

At Václavice is a Dutch-type windmill. It was built in 1842–1843 and was used until the 1890s. It is a valuable and well-preserved technical monument.

== Twin towns – sister cities ==
Hrádek nad Nisou is twinned with:

- Bogatynia, Poland
- Kralupy nad Vltavou, Czech Republic
- Zittau, Germany
