= Bolesławiec railway station =

Railway station in Bolesławiec, Poland

Bolesławiec
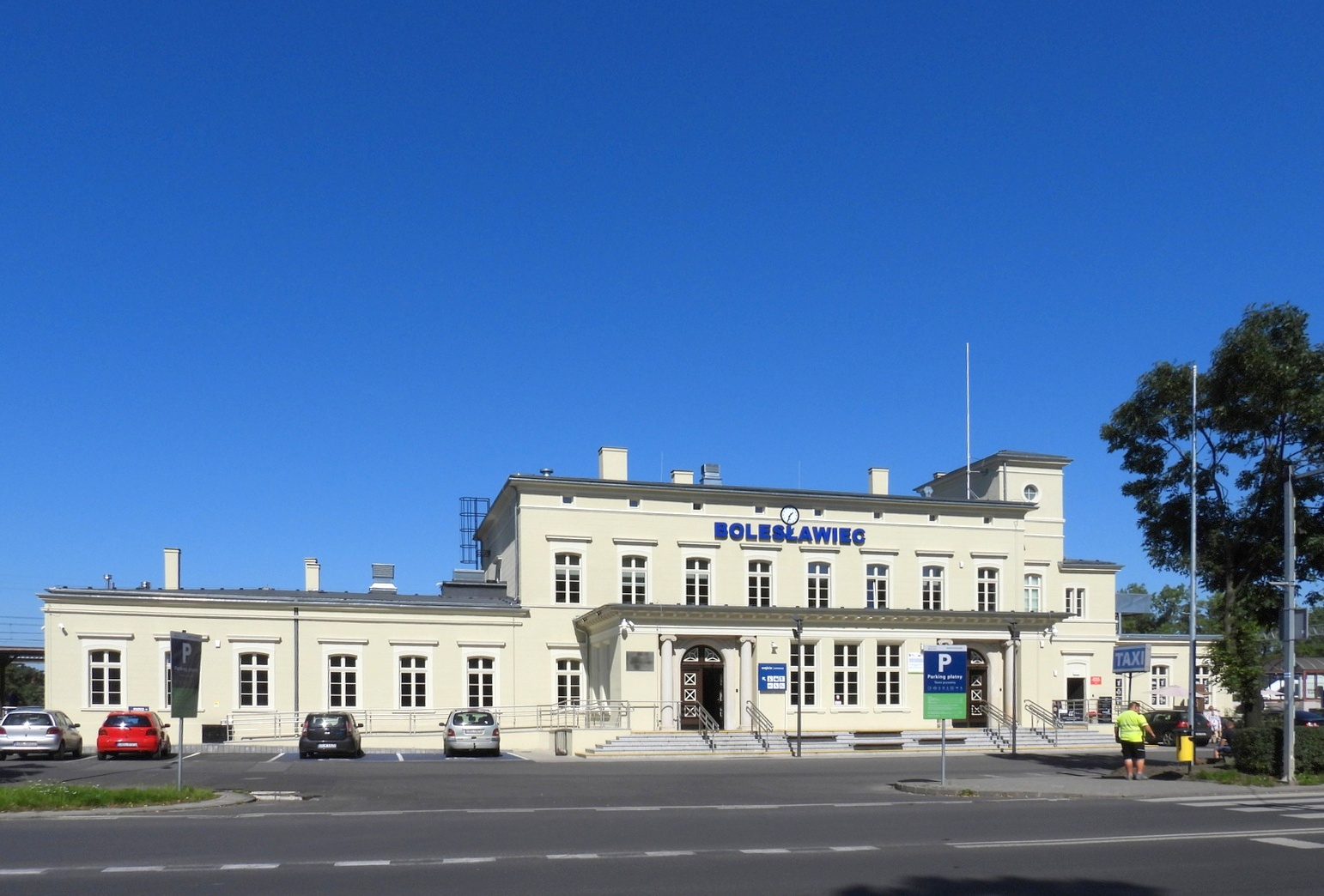
- Station building

General information
- Location: Bolesławiec, Lower Silesian Voivodeship; Poland
- Coordinates: 51°15′58″N 15°34′09″E
- Line: Miłkowice–Jasień railway
- Platforms: 3

History
- Opened: 1 October 1845
- Electrified: 23 December 1985

Key dates
- 2022: Station building renovated

Services
Preceding station	PKP Intercity	Following station
Chojnów towards Warszawa Wschodnia	IC	Węgliniec towards Zgorzelec
Preceding station	KD	Following station
Tomaszów Bolesławiecki towards Wrocław Główny	D1	Zebrzydowa towards Lubań Śląski
Tomaszów Bolesławiecki towards Wrocław Główny	D10	Zebrzydowa towards Dresden Hauptbahnhof
Location
- Location within Poland Location within Lower Silesian Voivodeship

Bolesławiec (German: Bunzlau) is a railway station in the city of Bolesławiec, within the Lower Silesian Voivodeship, in south-western Poland.

The station is located on Bolesława Chrobrego street, approximately 470 m (1,540 ft) from the city centre.

== History ==
=== Pre World War II ===
The station opened as Bunzlau on 1 October 1845 after the local railway line was extended from Legnica. The line was extended to Węgliniec on 1 September 1846. The Bolesławiec rail viaduct was constructed part of the line.

The line was then extended to Berlin on 1 September 1847 by the Lower Silesian-Marchian Railway Company. The line to Zgorzelec via Węgliniec also opened on the same day.

The station and the viaduct were both visited by Frederick William IV of Prussia on 8 May 1852, and Alexander II of Russia on 29 May 1856.

In 1852, the Lower Silesian-Margarch Railway Company was nationalised by Prussia and became one of the first Prussian state railways. In 1920 the station was taken over by the Deutsche Reichsbahn.

In 1857, a post office opened in the station. It was rebuilt in 1900, and destroyed during World War II in 1945, and never rebuilt after. The station building was expanded in 1926

In 1906, a railway line opened to Nowa Wieś Grodziska. Seven years after the opening of the railway towards Nowa Wieś Grodziska, a similar local railway to Modła was launched in 1913. Trains terminated at Bolesławiec Wschód lit. 'Bolesławiec West'. Both railway lines were dismantled by 2008.

The two private companies operating the railways merged into one in 1921, under the name Bunzlauer Kleinbahn AG (Polish: Kolejka Bolesławiecka) lit. 'Bolesławiec railway'.

=== Post World War II ===
After World War II, the area past the Lusatian Neisse and Oder rivers came under Polish administration. As a result, the station was taken over by Polish State Railways and was renamed to Bolesławiec.

The Miłkowice–Jasień railway to the station was electrified on 23 December 1985.

On 6 April 2020, Polish State Railways signed a contract for the full renovation of the station building. The new renovated station building opened in May 2022.

== Train services ==
Train services are operated by Lower Silesian Railways, PKP Intercity and Polregio. Until mid-December 2014 the station was also served by EuroCity "Wawel", which used to run once daily between Berlin Hauptbahnhof and Wrocław Główny.

The station is served by the following service(s):

- Intercity services (IC) Zgorzelec - Legnica - Wrocław - Ostrów Wielkopolski - Łódź - Warszawa
- Regional services (KD) Wrocław - Legnica - Węgliniec - Lubań Śląski
- Regional services (KD) Wrocław - Legnica - Zgorzelec - Görlitz

== Gallery ==
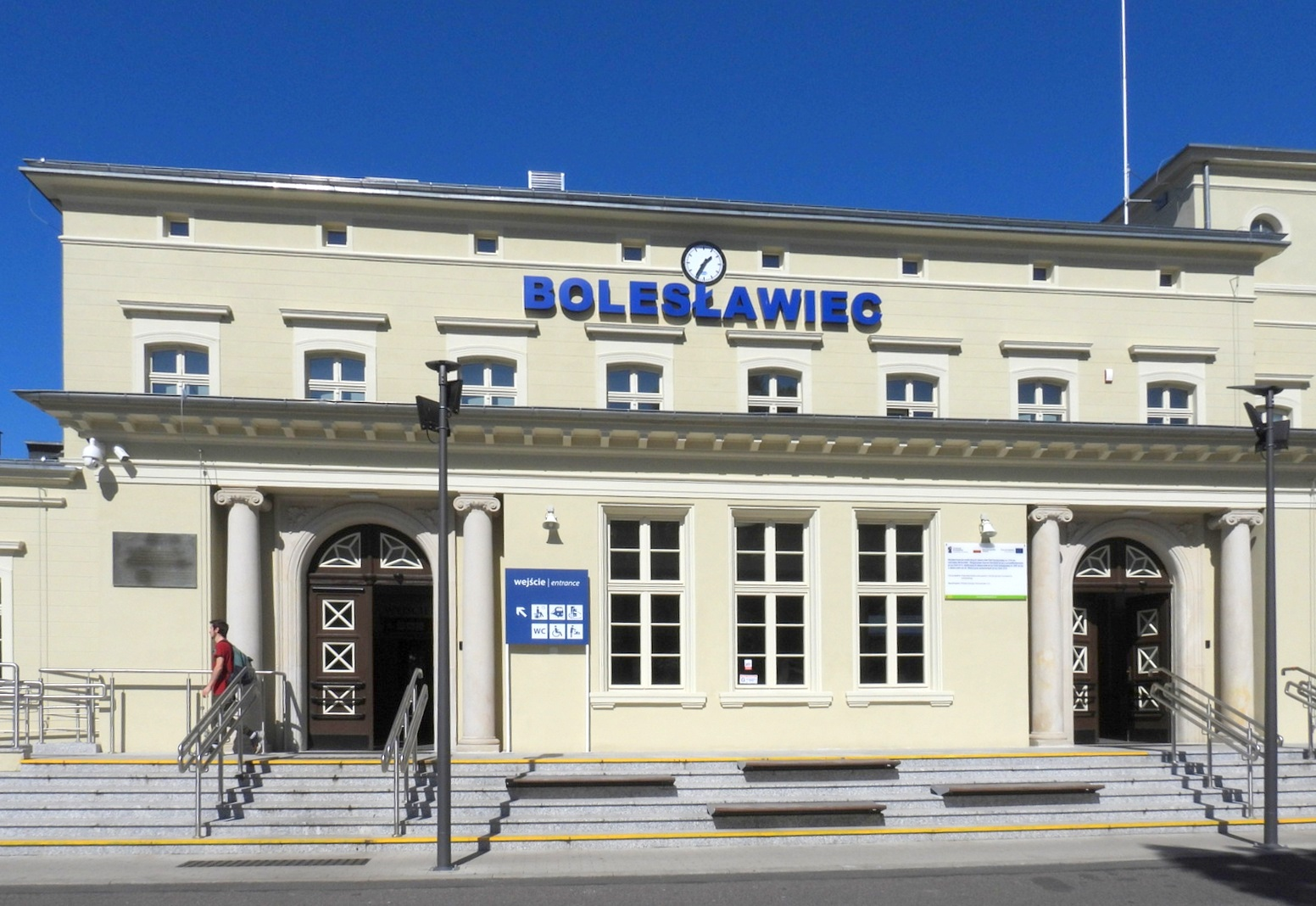
Main entrance

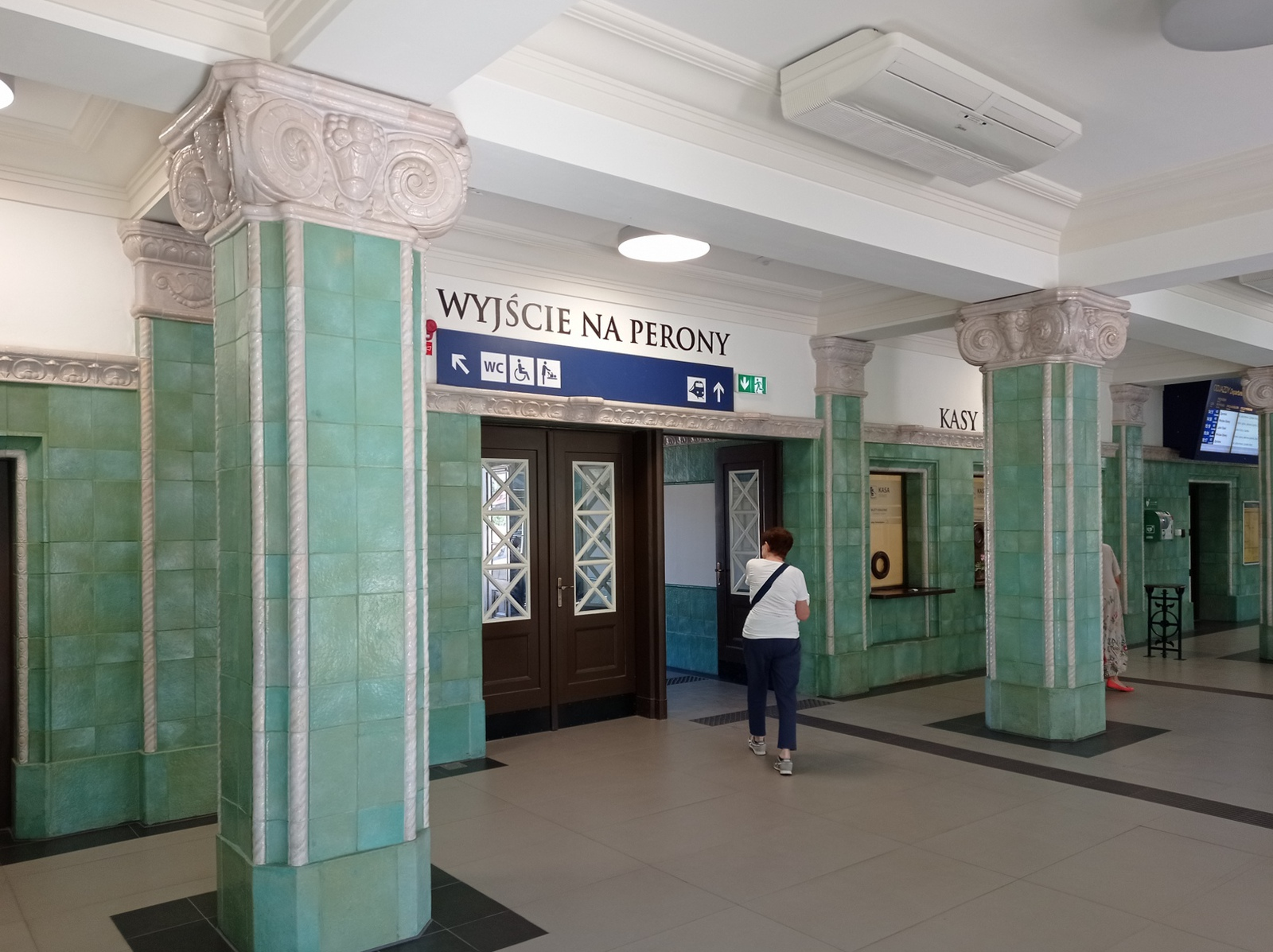
Waiting room

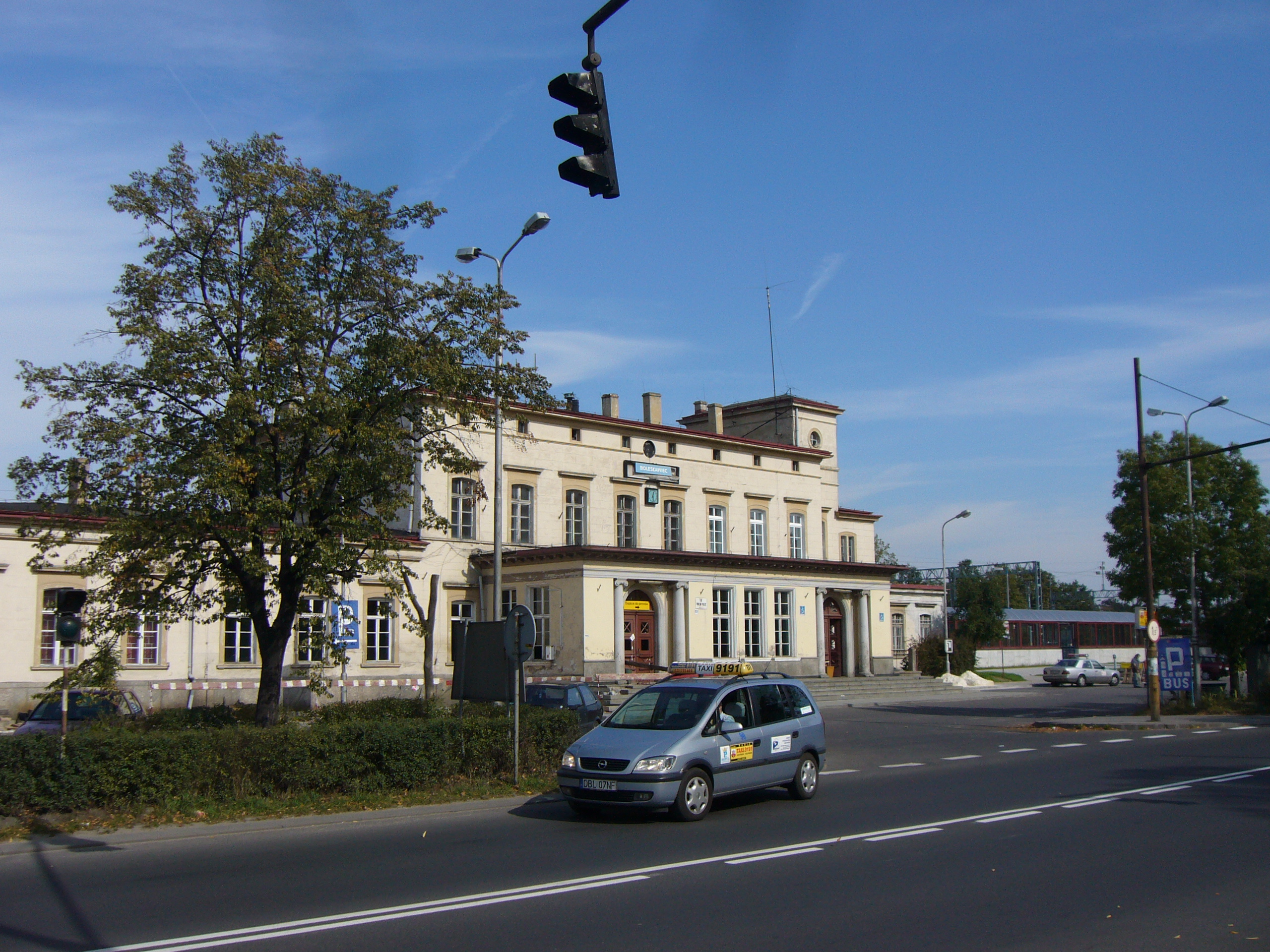
Station building prior to renovations

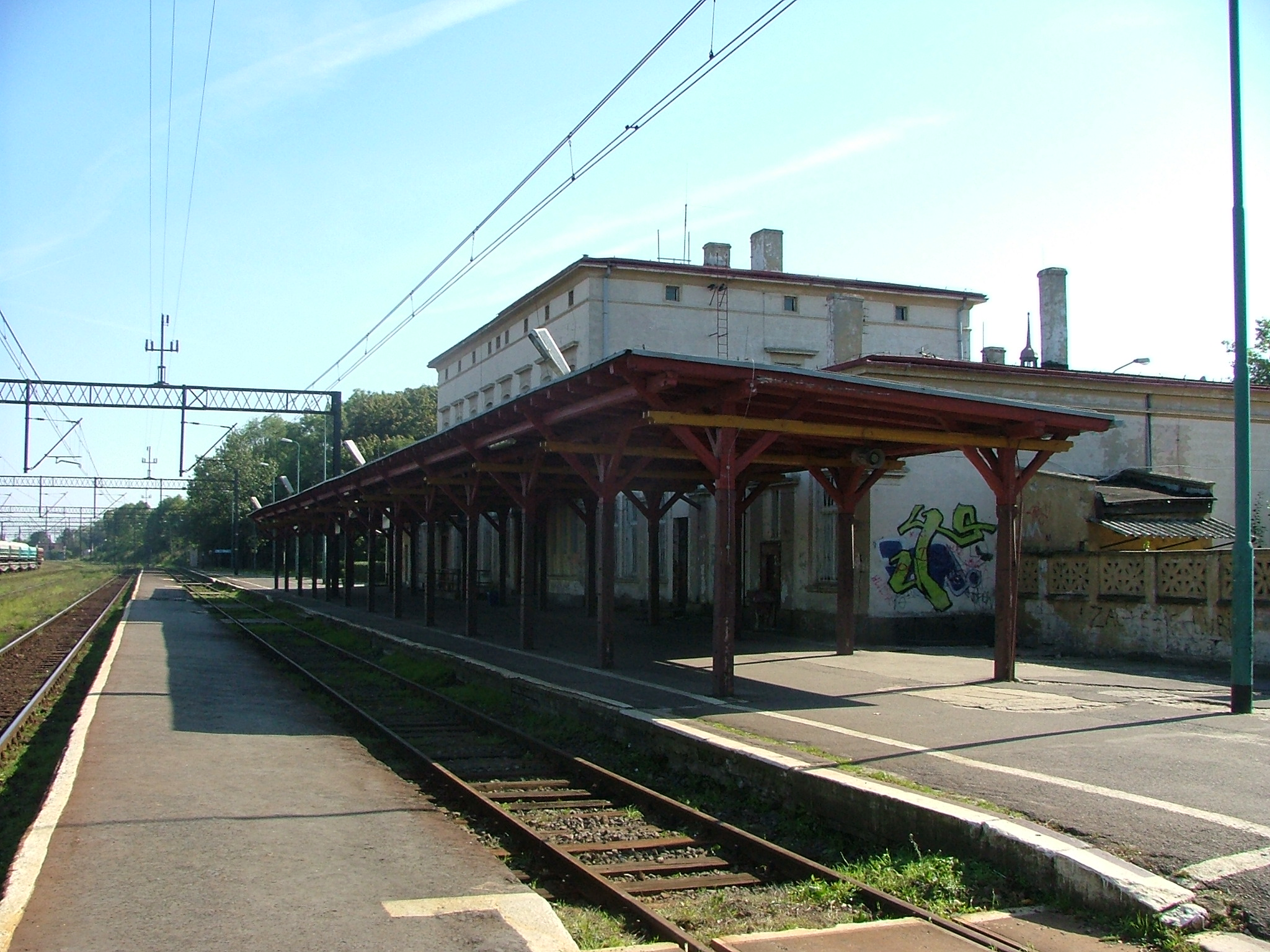
Platforms prior torenovations
