= Osetnica railway station =

Railway station in south-western Poland

Osetnica
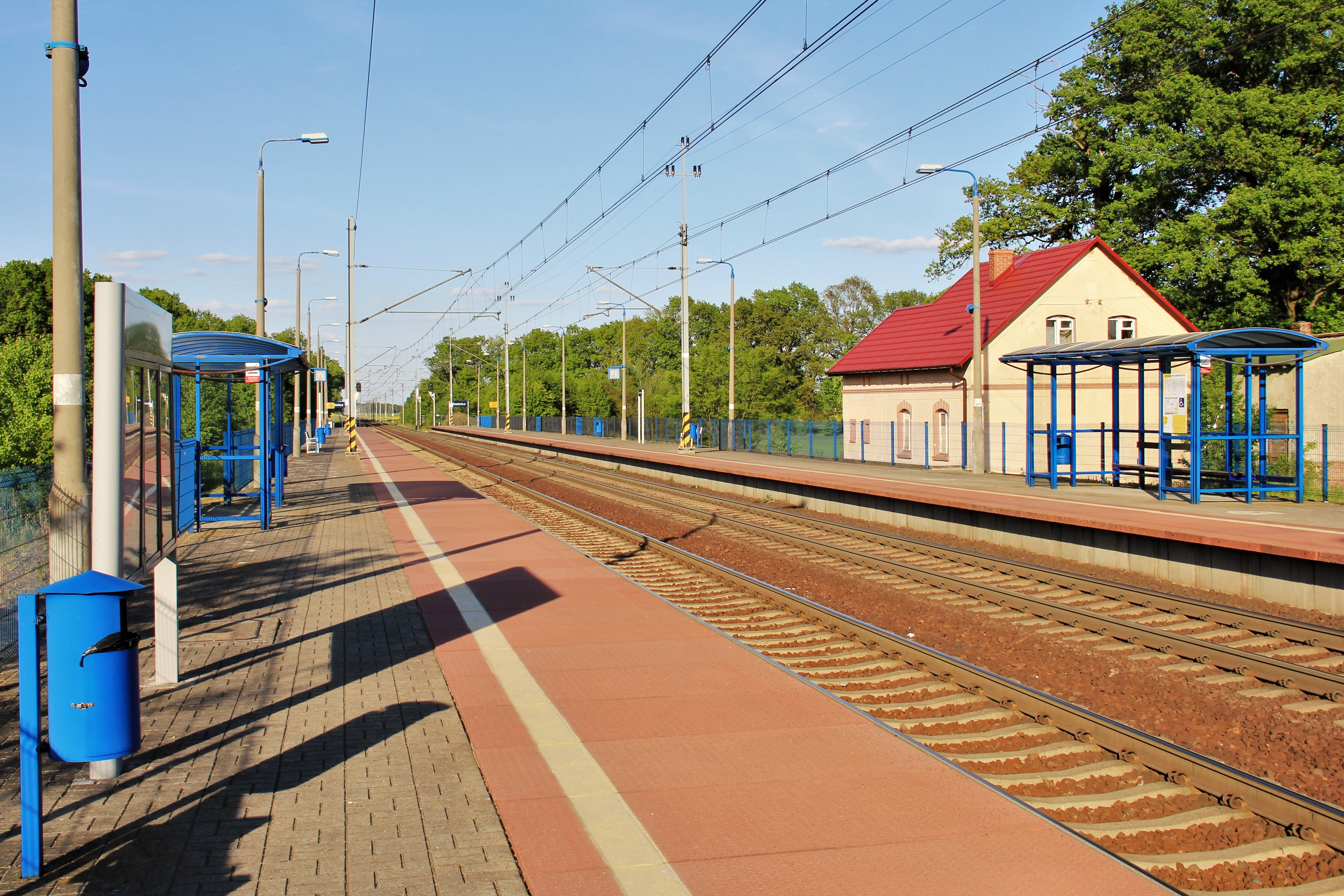
- Platforms

General information
- Location: Osetnica, Lower Silesian Voivodeship; Poland
- Coordinates: 51°15′42.0″N 15°50′47.1″E
- Owner: Polskie Koleje Państwowe S.A.
- Line: Miłkowice–Jasień railway
- Platforms: 2

History
- Opened: 1 October 1845
- Electrified: 1985
- Former names: Steinsdorf (before 1945); Kamienice nad Deszną (1945–1947)

Services
| Preceding station | KD | Following station |
|---|---|---|
| Chojnów towards Wrocław Główny | D1 | Okmiany towards Lubań Śląski |
| Chojnów towards Wrocław Główny | D10 | Okmiany towards Dresden Hauptbahnhof |
Location
- Location within Poland Location within Lower Silesian Voivodeship

Osetnica (German: Steinsdorf) is a railway station on the Miłkowice–Jasień railway in the village of Osetnica, Legnica County, within the Lower Silesian Voivodeship in south-western Poland.

== History ==
The station opened on 1 October 1845 as Steinsdorf. After World War II, the area east of the Oder–Neisse line came under Polish administration. As a result, the station was taken over by Polish State Railways and was renamed to Kamienice nad Deszną, and later to its modern name, Osetnica, in 1947.

Crossing guards were stationed here until January 1993. In 2008, part of the E30 main line modernisations, the platforms were rebuilt, and the station building was converted into a residential building.

== Train services ==
The station is served by the following services:

- Regional services (KD) Wrocław - Legnica - Węgliniec - Lubań Śląski
- Regional services (KD) Wrocław - Legnica - Zgorzelec - Görlitz
