= Stary Węgliniec =

- Village
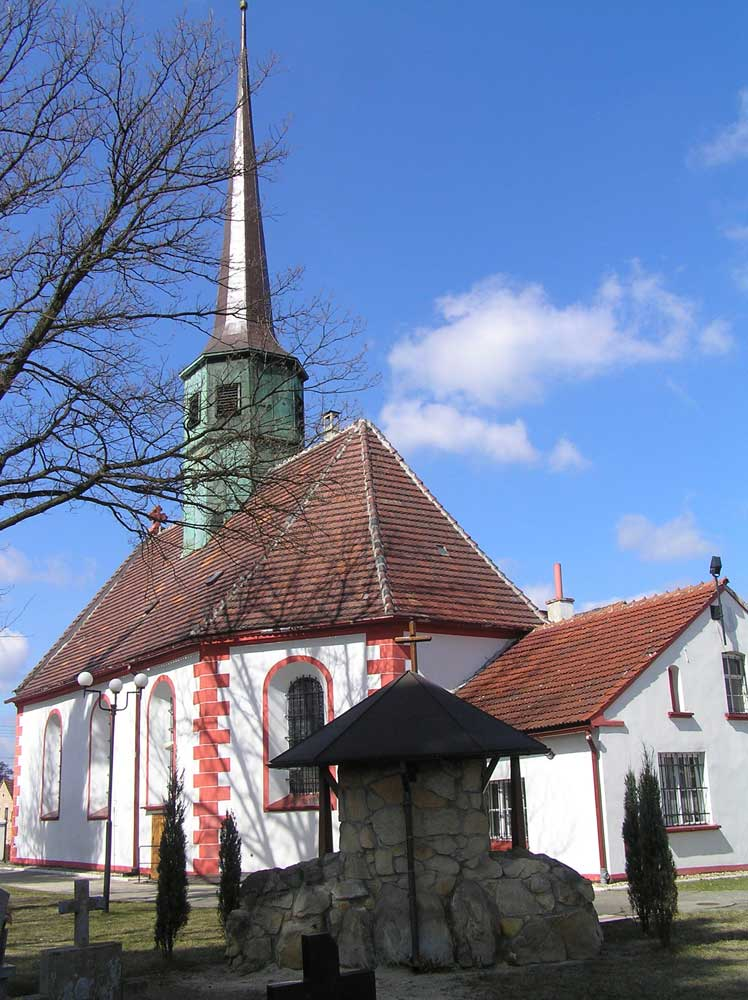
- Church of the Virgin Mary

- Location within Poland
- Coordinates: 51°18′N 15°12′E
- Country: Poland
- Voivodeship: Lower Silesian
- County: Zgorzelec
- Gmina: Węgliniec
- First mentioned: 1502
- Population (2021): 956
- Postal code: 59-940
- Area code: +48 75
- Vehicle registration: DZG
- Website: www.starywegliniec.pl

Stary Węgliniec [ˈstarɨ vɛŋˈɡliɲɛt͡s] lit. 'Old Węgliniec' (German: Alt Kohlfurt, Kohlfurt-Dorf; Upper Sorbian: Alte Wěgliniec) is a village in the Lower Silesian Forest, located in the administrative district of Gmina Węgliniec, within Zgorzelec County, Lower Silesian Voivodeship, in south-western Poland.

== History ==
The village was first mentioned as a settlement in 1502. It was built near an iron forge which was in operation until 1760 and belonged to the Görlitz city council. During the Napoleonic Wars in 1813, and the Seven Years' War, various armies passed through the village and forced locals to pay tribute. In September 1759, over 12,000 soldiers were stationed here, under the command of General Weiser.

In 1905, the first mine opened, which led to a number of people moving here and the growth of the village. Minerals were distributed with the railway line, and, from clay deposits, a glass industry began to flourish.

After World War II, the village came under Polish administration due to the Potsdam Agreement. The village was renamed to Węglowiec Stary and later to its modern name, Stary Węgliniec on 12 November 1946.

== Transport ==
=== Rail ===
The village is served by Stary Węgliniec railway station on the Miłkowice–Jasień railway.

=== Road ===
Voivodeship road number 296 passes through Stary Węgliniec.
