= Okmiany =

- Village
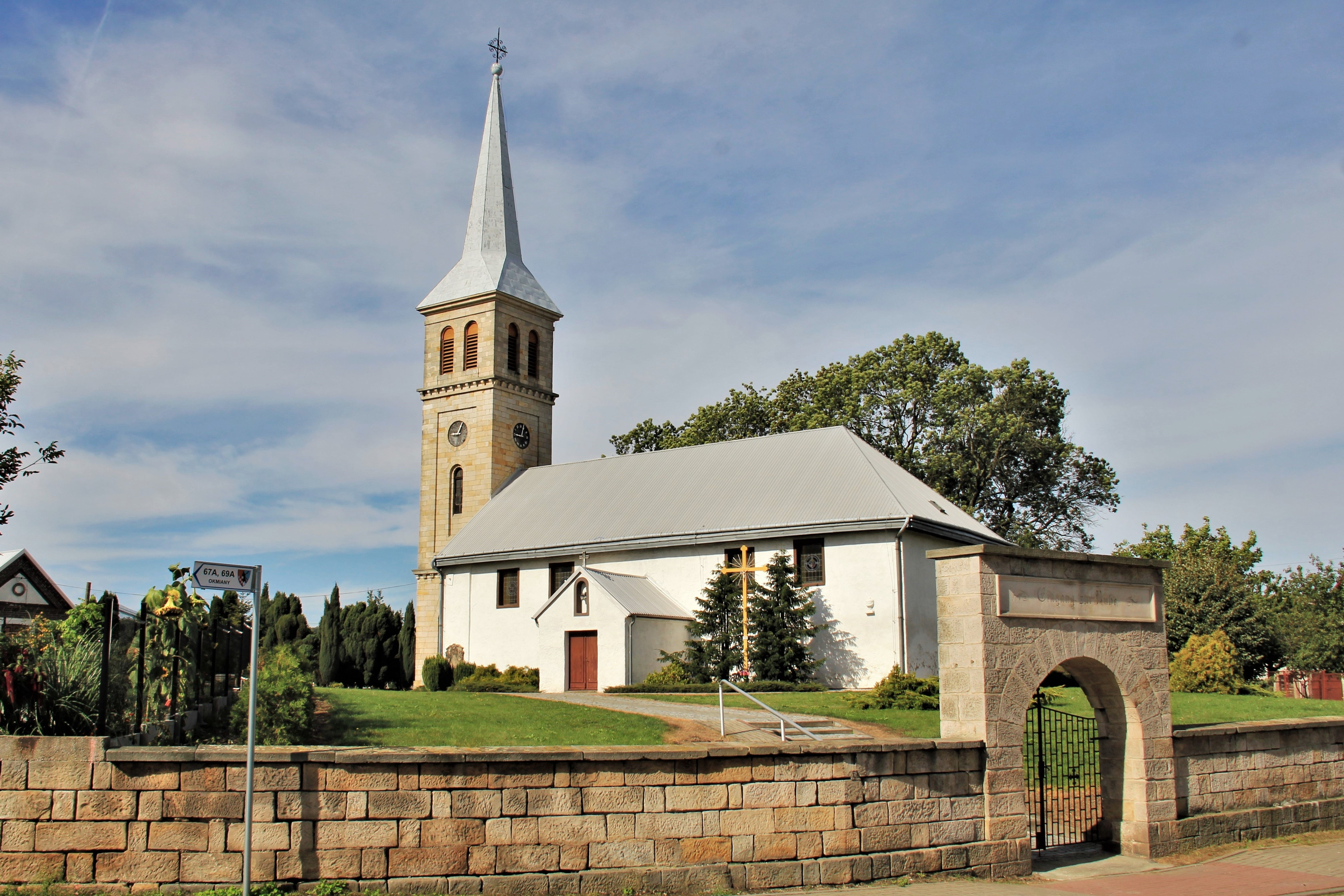
- Catholic church

- Location within Poland
- Coordinates: 51°15′N 15°47′E
- Country: Poland
- Voivodeship: Lower Silesian
- County: Legnica
- Gmina: Chojnów

Okmiany [ɔkˈmjanɨ] is a village in the administrative district of Gmina Chojnów, within Legnica County, Lower Silesian Voivodeship, in south-western Poland.

== Transport ==
Okmiany railway station serves the village on the Miłkowice–Jasień railway.
