= Tomaszów Bolesławiecki =

- Village
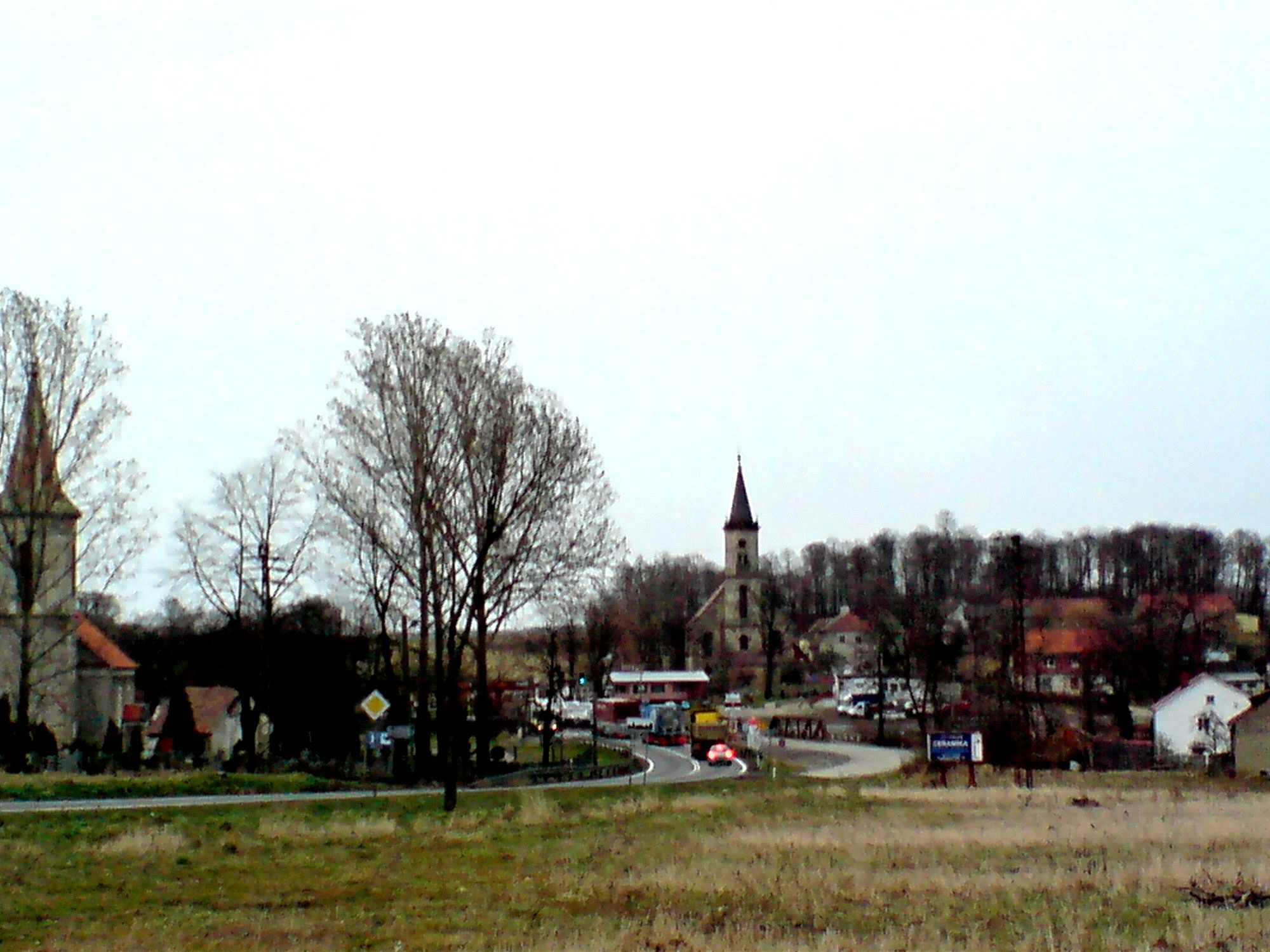
- Churches

- Location within Poland
- Coordinates: 51°15′48″N 15°41′03″E
- Country: Poland
- Voivodeship: Lower Silesian
- County: Bolesławiec
- Gmina: Warta Bolesławiecka
- Founded: 1210
- First mentioned: 1259
- Population (2021): 1,953
- Postal code: 59-720
- Area code: +48 75
- Vehicle registration: DBL

Tomaszów Bolesławiecki, [tɔˈmaʂuf bɔlɛswaˈvjɛt͡ski] (German: Thomaswaldau) historically Tomaszów Górny is a village in the administrative district of Gmina Warta Bolesławiecka, within Bolesławiec County, Lower Silesian Voivodeship, in south-western Poland.

== History ==
The village was founded in 1210 and later first mentioned in 1259. It developed from a settlement along the Via Regia trade route (the royal route). The village was mentioned as Thomaswalde in 1376 and was owned by the von Bolz, von Bibran, von Hocke, von Axleben, and von Pückler noble families.

Near the village, on 28 July 1488, Silesian and Hungarian knights under the command of Hans von Haugwitz defeated Czech reinforcements coming to the aid of Jan II the Mad.

== Transport ==
=== Rail ===
The village is served by Tomaszów Bolesławiecki railway station on the Miłkowice–Jasień railway. The station lies approximately 2.5 km (1.6 mi) from the centre of the village.

=== Road ===
Polish national road 94 passes through the village.
