= Tomaszów Bolesławiecki railway station =

Railway station in south-western Poland

Tomaszów Bolesławiecki
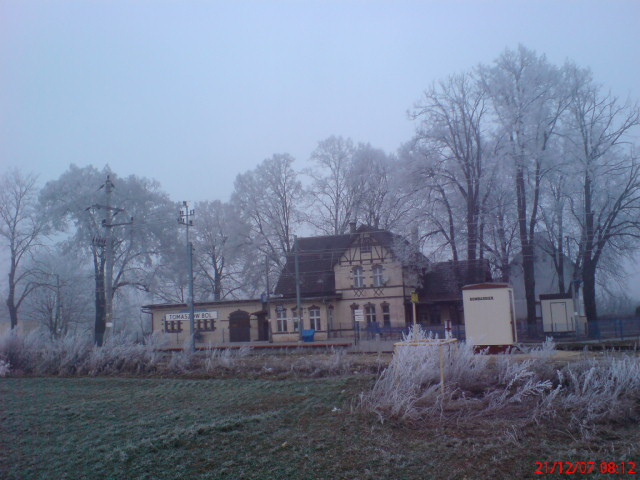
- Station

General information
- Location: Tomaszów Bolesławiecki, Lower Silesian Voivodeship; Poland
- Coordinates: 51°17′09.1″N 15°40′48.0″E
- Owner: Polskie Koleje Państwowe S.A.
- Line: Miłkowice–Jasień railway
- Platforms: 2

History
- Opened: 1845
- Electrified: 1985
- Former names: Thomaswaldau (1845–1945); Tomin (1945–1947); Tomkowice (1947–1948)

Services
Preceding station	KD	Following station
Okmiany towards Wrocław Główny	D1	Bolesławiec towards Lubań Śląski
Okmiany towards Wrocław Główny	D10	Bolesławiec towards Dresden Hauptbahnhof
Location
- Location within Poland Location within Lower Silesian Voivodeship

Tomaszów Bolesławiecki (German: Thomaswaldau) is a railway station on the Miłkowice–Jasień railway in the village of Tomaszów Bolesławiecki, Bolesławiec County, within the Lower Silesian Voivodeship in south-western Poland.

== History ==
The station opened in 1845 as Thomaswaldau. After World War II, the area past the Lusatian Neisse and Oder rivers came under Polish administration. As a result, the station was taken over by Polish State Railways and was renamed to Tomin, then to Tomkowice in 1947 and later to its modern name Tomaszów Bolesławiecki in 1948.

Part of the E30 main line modernisations, the station platforms were rebuilt. The track sidings leading to Krzywa airfield in Krzywa were dismantled. They branched off north-east from the station.

== Train services ==
The station is served by the following services:

- Regional services (KD) Wrocław - Legnica - Węgliniec - Lubań Śląski
- Regional services (KD) Wrocław - Legnica - Zgorzelec - Görlitz
