= Jagodzin railway station =

Railway station in south-western Poland

Jagodzin
- Lubusz branch of Polregio SA133 train at the station in September 2026

General information
- Location: Jagodzin, Lower Silesian Voivodeship; Poland
- Coordinates: 51°21′18.0″N 15°10′13.0″E
- Owner: Polish State Railways
- Line: Miłkowice–Jasień railway
- Platforms: 1
- Tracks: 1

History
- Opened: 1 September 1846
- Former names: Neuhammer (1846–1914); Neuhammer (Oberlausitz) (1914–1945); Kuźnica Nowa (1945–1947)

Services
Preceding station	Polregio	Following station
Stary Węgliniec towards Görlitz	PR	Ruszów towards Zielona Góra Główna
Location
- Location within Poland Location within Lower Silesian Voivodeship

Jagodzin (German: Neuhammer) is a railway station on the Miłkowice–Jasień railway in the village of Jagodzin, Zgorzelec County, within the Lower Silesian Voivodeship in south-western Poland.

== History ==
The station opened in 1846 as Neuhammer, which was later renamed to Neuhammer (Oberlausitz) in 1905. After World War II, the area came under Polish administration. As a result, the station was taken over by Polish State Railways. The station was renamed to Kuźnica Nowa Kaławska and later to its modern name, Jagodzin in 1947.

A station building once stood at the station, until it was demolished.

== Train services ==
The station is served by the following service(s):

- Regional services (R) Görlitz - Żary - Zielona Góra
