= Okmiany railway station =

Railway station in south-western Poland

Okmiany
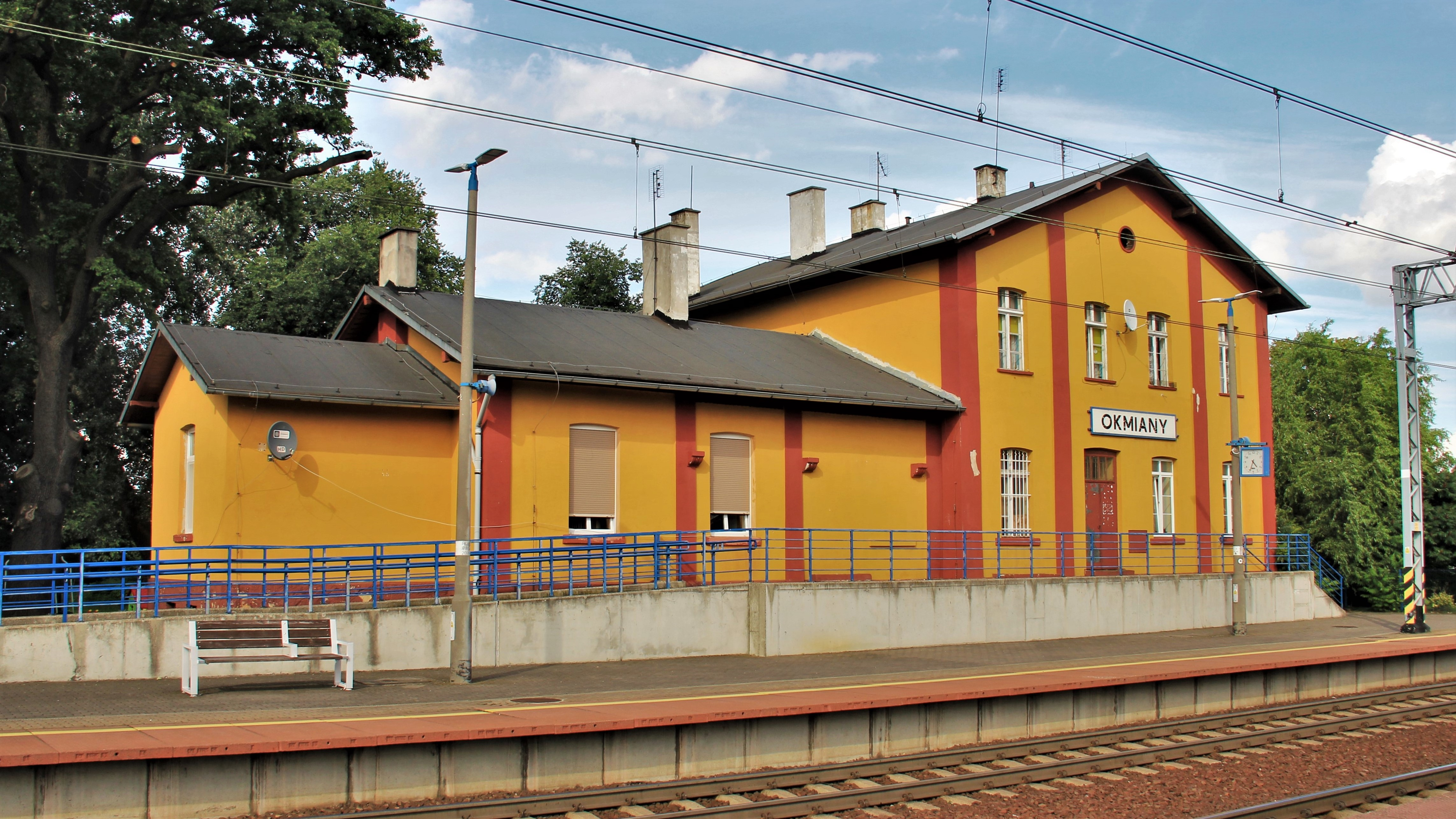
- Station building

General information
- Location: Okmiany, Lower Silesian Voivodeship; Poland
- Coordinates: 51°15′42.0″N 15°50′47.1″E
- Owner: Polskie Koleje Państwowe S.A.
- Line: Miłkowice–Jasień railway
- Platforms: 2

History
- Opened: 1 October 1845
- Electrified: 1985
- Former names: Kaiserswaldau (before 1945)

Services
Preceding station	KD	Following station
Osetnica towards Wrocław Główny	D1	Tomaszów Bolesławiecki towards Lubań Śląski
Osetnica towards Wrocław Główny	D10	Tomaszów Bolesławiecki towards Dresden Hauptbahnhof
Location
- Location within Poland Location within Lower Silesian Voivodeship

Okmiany (German: Kaiserswaldau) is a railway station on the Miłkowice–Jasień railway in the village of Okmiany, Legnica County, within the Lower Silesian Voivodeship in south-western Poland.

== History ==
The station opened on 1 October 1845 as Kaiserswaldau. After World War II, the area east of the Oder–Neisse line came under Polish administration. As a result, the station was taken over by Polish State Railways and was renamed to Okmiany.

In 2006, part of the E30 main line modernisations, the platforms were rebuilt, and the station building was converted into a residential building.

== Train services ==
The station is served by the following services:

- Regional services (KD) Wrocław - Legnica - Węgliniec - Lubań Śląski
- Regional services (KD) Wrocław - Legnica - Zgorzelec - Görlitz
