= Stary Węgliniec railway station =

Railway station in south-western Poland

Stary Węgliniec
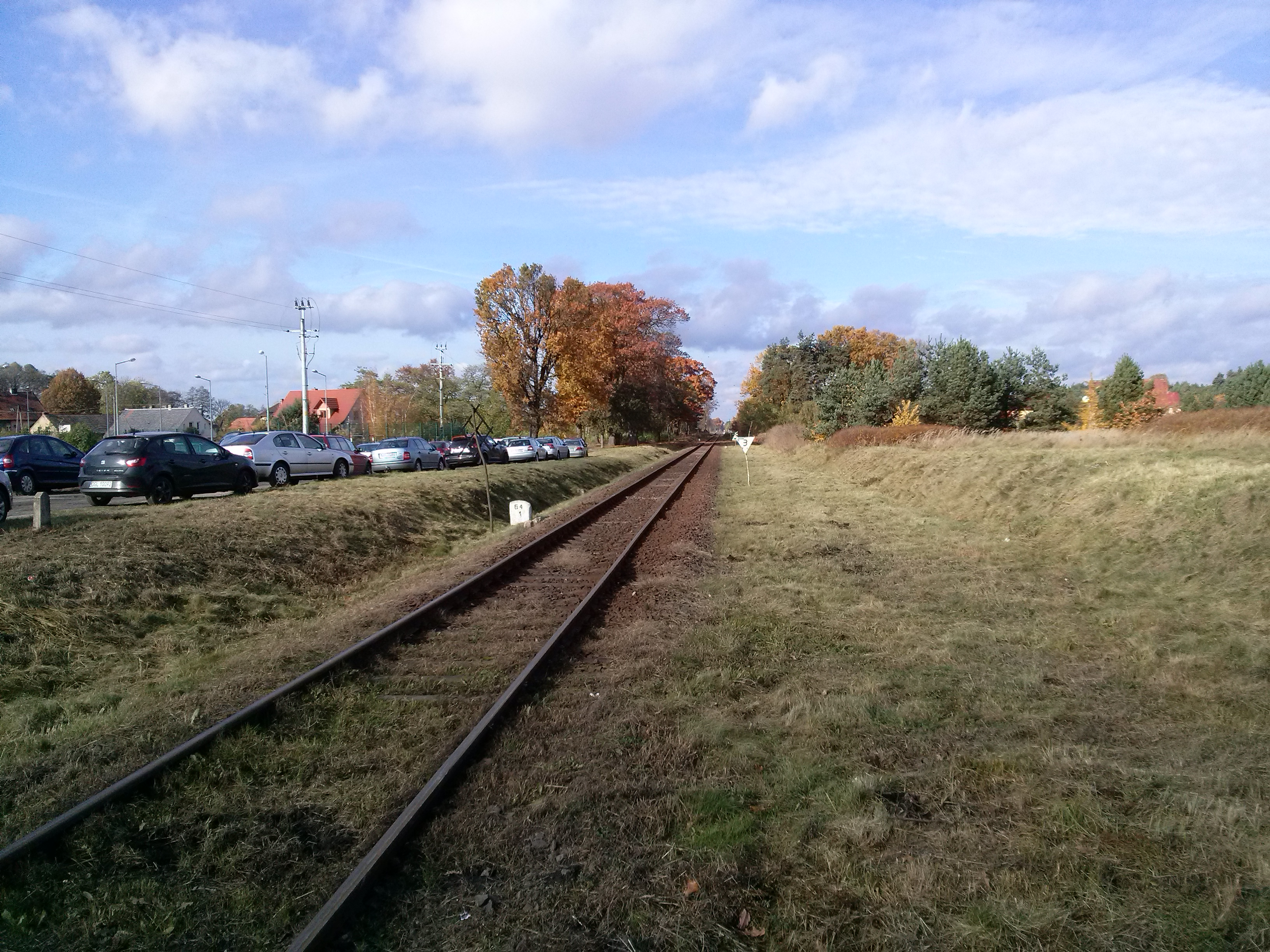
- Railway line

General information
- Location: Stary Węgliniec, Lower Silesian Voivodeship; Poland
- Coordinates: 51°18′26.0″N 15°11′43.0″E
- Owner: Polish State Railways
- Line: Miłkowice–Jasień railway
- Platforms: 1
- Tracks: 1

History
- Opened: 1 September 1846
- Former names: Kohlfurt Dorf (1846–1937); Alt Kohlfurt (1937–1945); Kaławsk Stary (1945–1947)

Services
Preceding station	Polregio	Following station
Węgliniec towards Görlitz	PR	Jagodzin towards Zielona Góra Główna
Location
- Location within Poland

Stary Węgliniec lit. 'Old Węgliniec' (German: Alt Kohlfurt) is a railway station on the Miłkowice–Jasień railway in the village of Stary Węgliniec, Zgorzelec County, within the Lower Silesian Voivodeship in south-western Poland.

== History ==
The station opened as Kohlfurt Dorf on 1 September 1846 part of a railway branch off Węgliniec, which later became the Miłkowice–Jasień railway. The station was renamed to Alt Kohlfurt in 1937.

After World War II, the area came under Polish administration. As a result, the station and the line were taken over by Polish State Railways. The station was renamed to Kaławsk Stary and later to its modern name, Stary Węgliniec in 1947.

== Train services ==
The station is served by the following service(s):

- Regional services (R) Görlitz - Żary - Zielona Góra
