= Chojnów railway station =

Railway station in Chojnów, south-western Poland

Chojnów
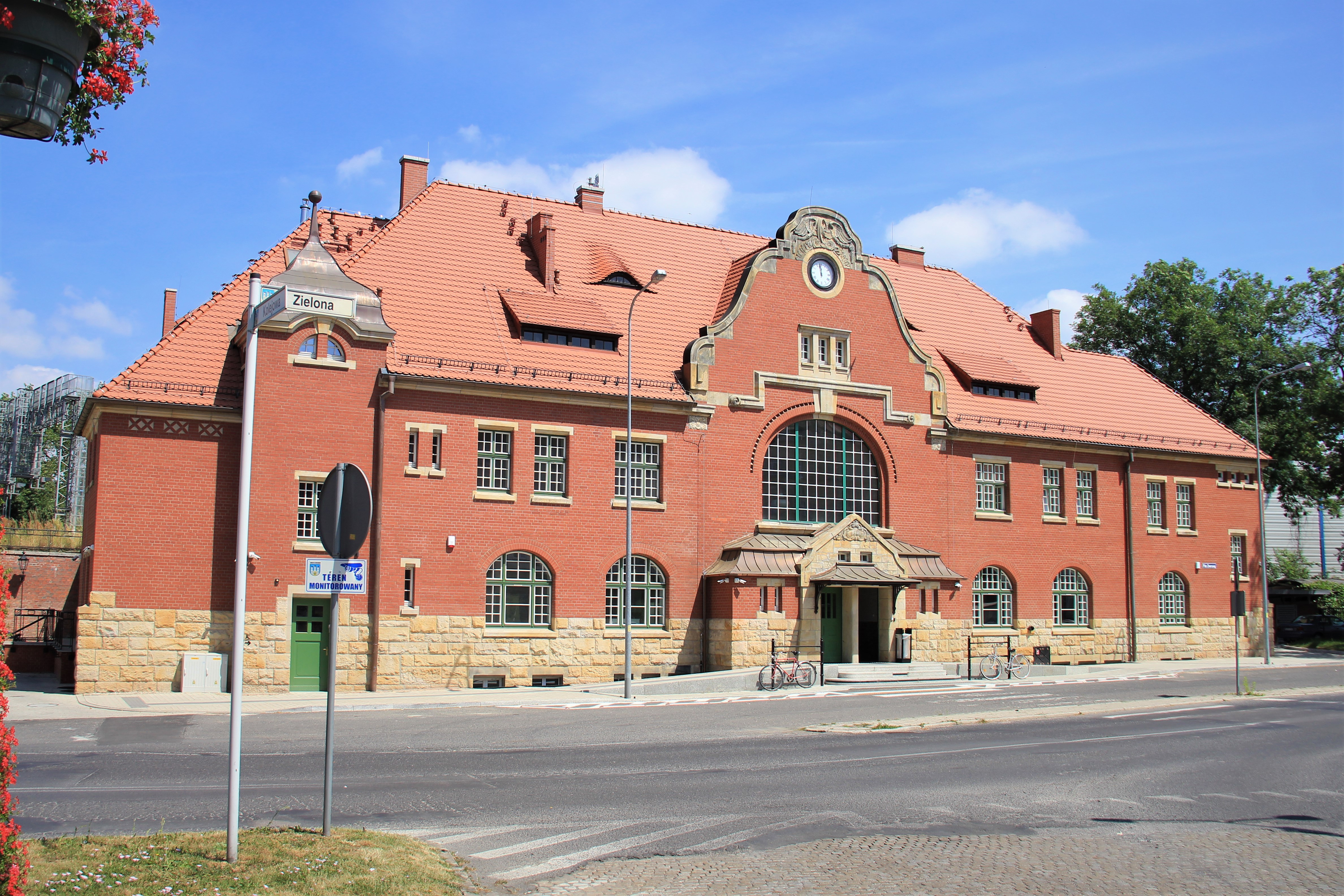
- Station building

General information
- Location: Chojnów, Lower Silesian Voivodeship; Poland
- Coordinates: 51°16′40″N 15°56′15.1″E
- Lines: Miłkowice–Jasień railway; Złotoryja–Rokitki railway
- Platforms: 4

History
- Opened: 1 October 1845
- Electrified: 21 December 1985
- Former names: Haynau (before 1945); Gajewicko (1945–1946)

Key dates
- 1910: Rebuilt
- 2019: Renovated
Location
- Location within Poland Location within Lower Silesian Voivodeship

Chojnów (German: Haynau) is a railway station in the town of Chojnów, within the Lower Silesian Voivodeship, in south-western Poland.

== History ==
The station opened as Hainau on 1 October 1845. The station was renamed to Haynau in 1860. In 1910, a new station building was built about 200 metres east of the former one, which was later demolished before 1930.

After World War II, the land past the Lusatian Neisse and Oder rivers came under Polish administration. As a result, the station was taken over Polish State Railways, and was renamed to Gajewicko and later to its modern name, Chojnów, in 1946.

On 26 May 1990, the section between Złotoryja and Chojnów of the Złotoryja–Rokitki railway closed. This followed up with the closure of the section between Rokitki and Chojnów on 14 December 2002.

In November 2017 Polish State Railways signed a contract for the full renovation of the station building. The renovation of the station was completed in April 2019, and costed about 9.7 million Polish złoty.

On 11 December 2022, the section of the Złotoryja–Rokitki railway between Rokitki and Chojnów reopened, after the reconstruction of the abandoned line. The reconstruction of the section costed about 24 million Polish złoty.

== Train services ==
The station is served by the following services:

- Intercity services (IC) Zgorzelec - Legnica - Wrocław - Ostrów Wielkopolski - Łódź - Warszawa
- Regional services (KD) Berlin - Cottbus - Węgliniec - Legnica - Wrocław (only on weekends)
- Regional services (KD) Wrocław - Legnica - Węgliniec - Lubań Śląski
- Regional services (KD) Wrocław - Legnica - Zgorzelec - Görlitz
- Regional services (KD) Legnica - Chojnów - Chocianów
- Regional services (KD) Wrocław - Legnica - Żary - Forst

== Gallery ==
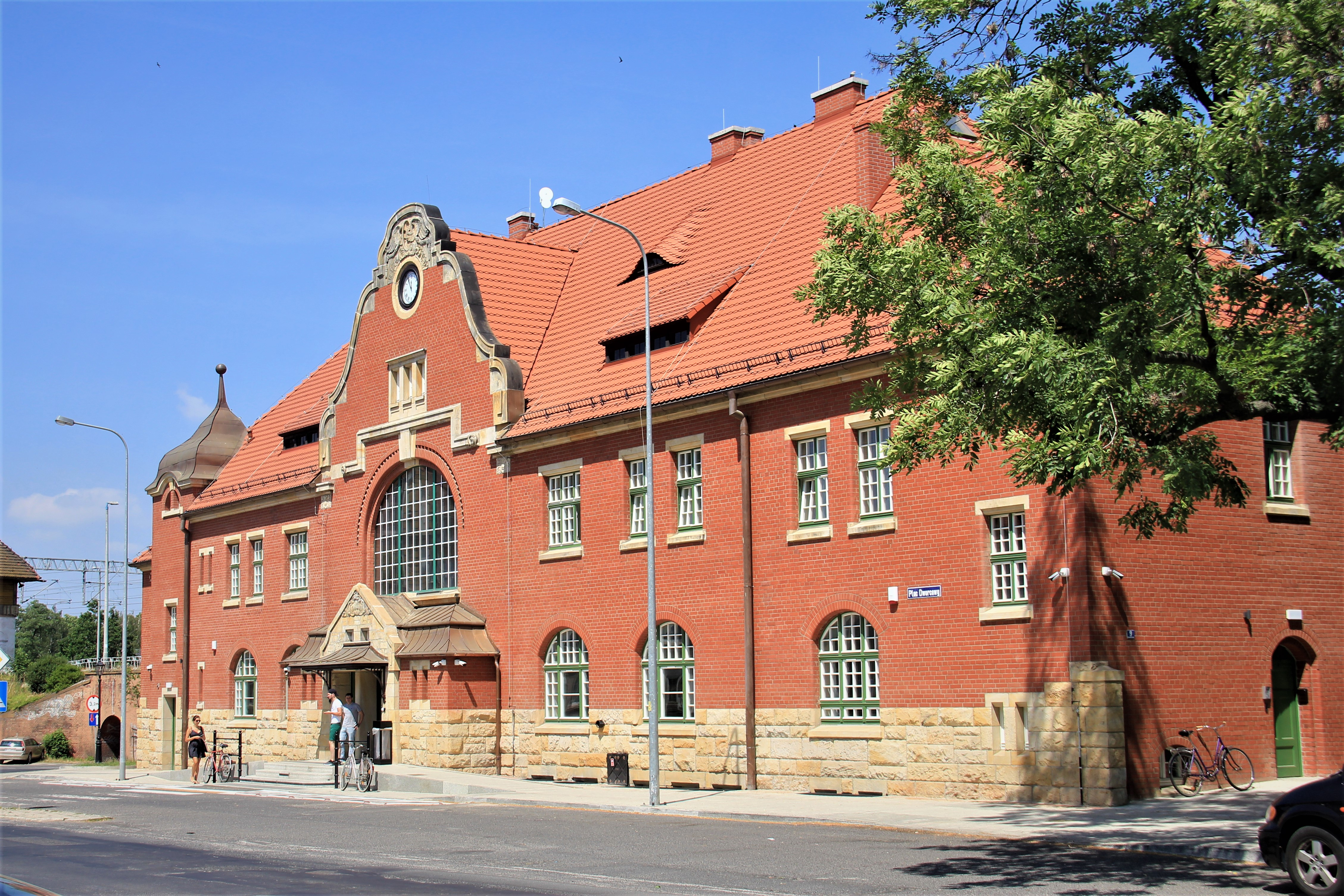
Station building

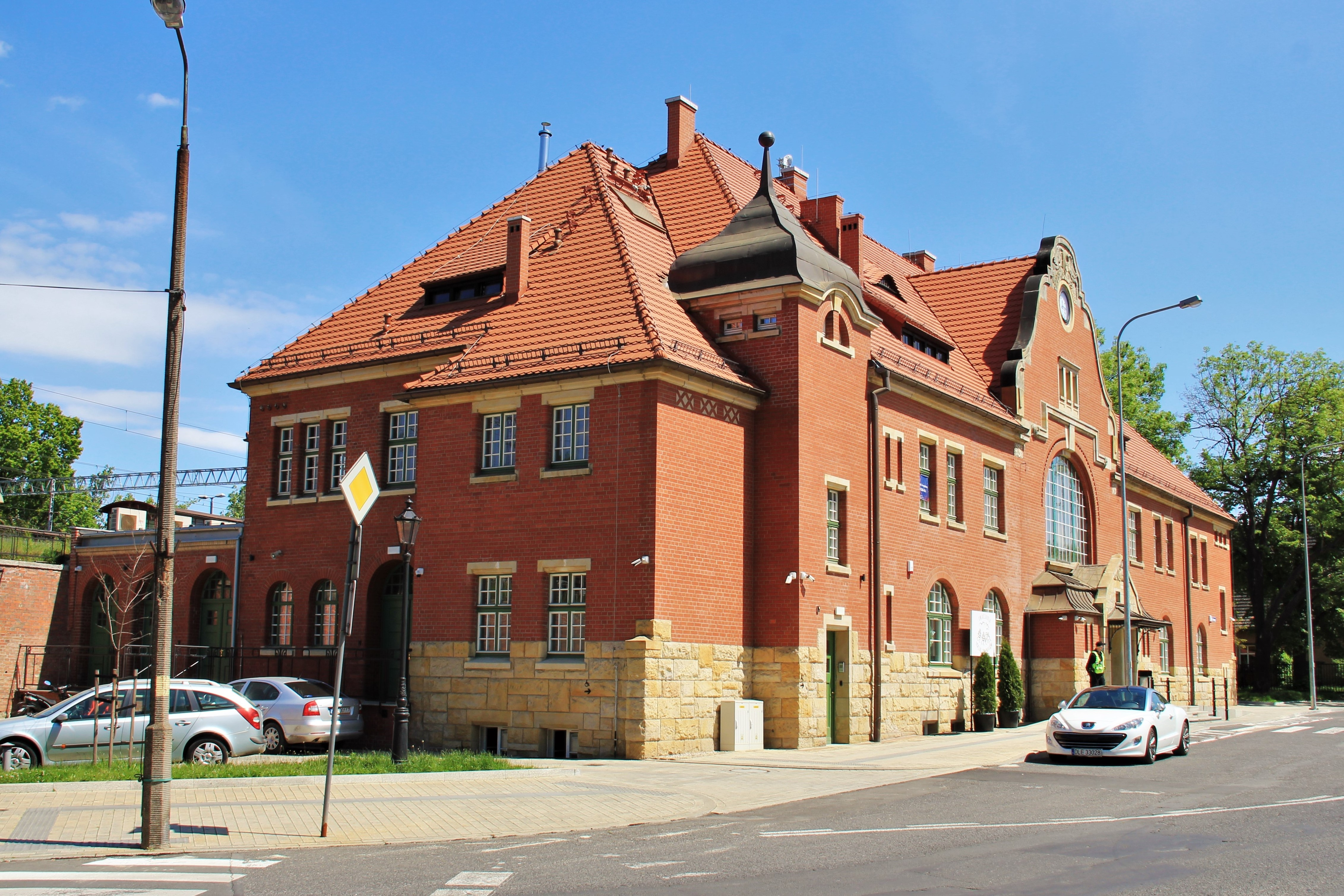

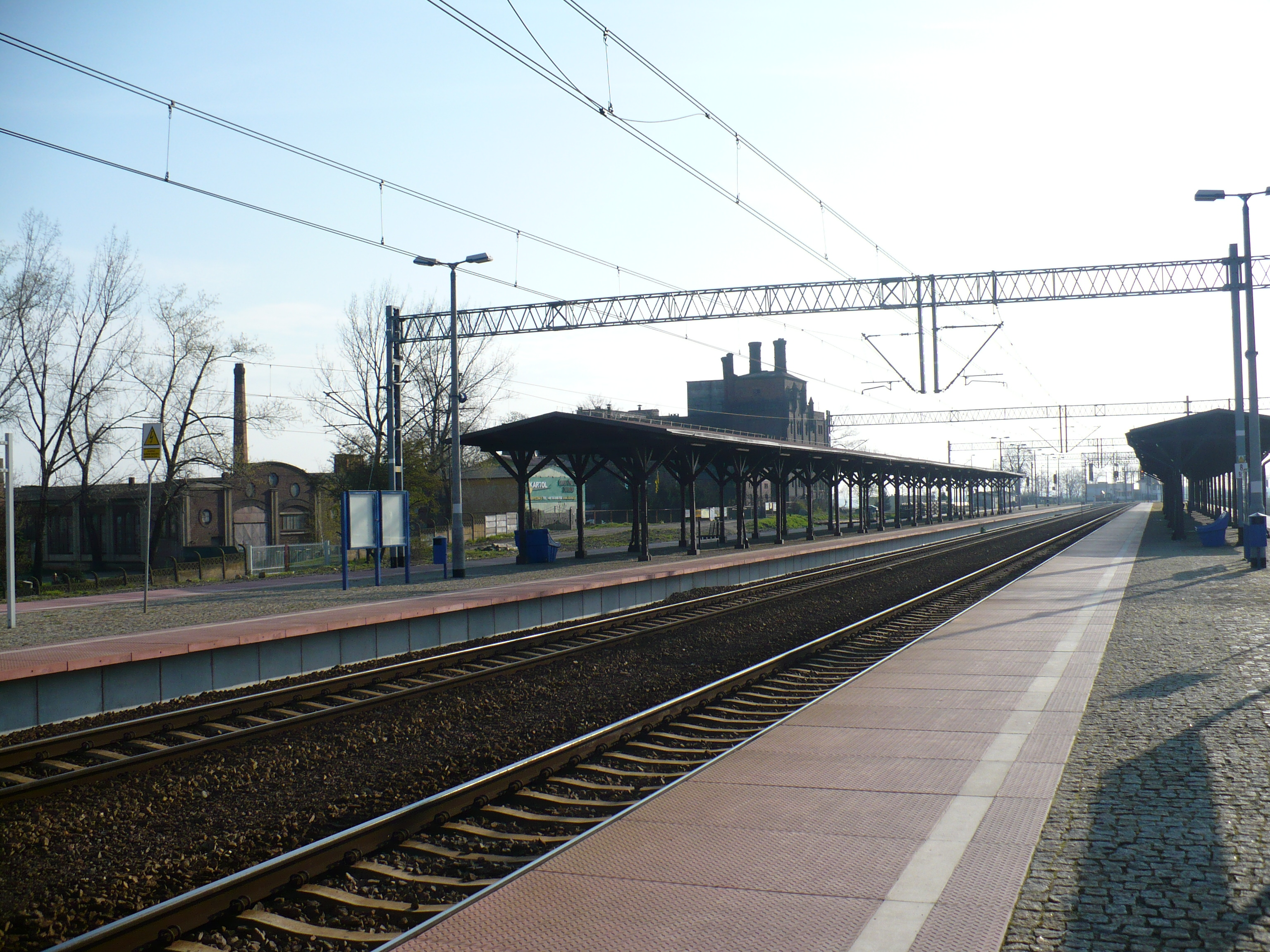
Mainline platforms

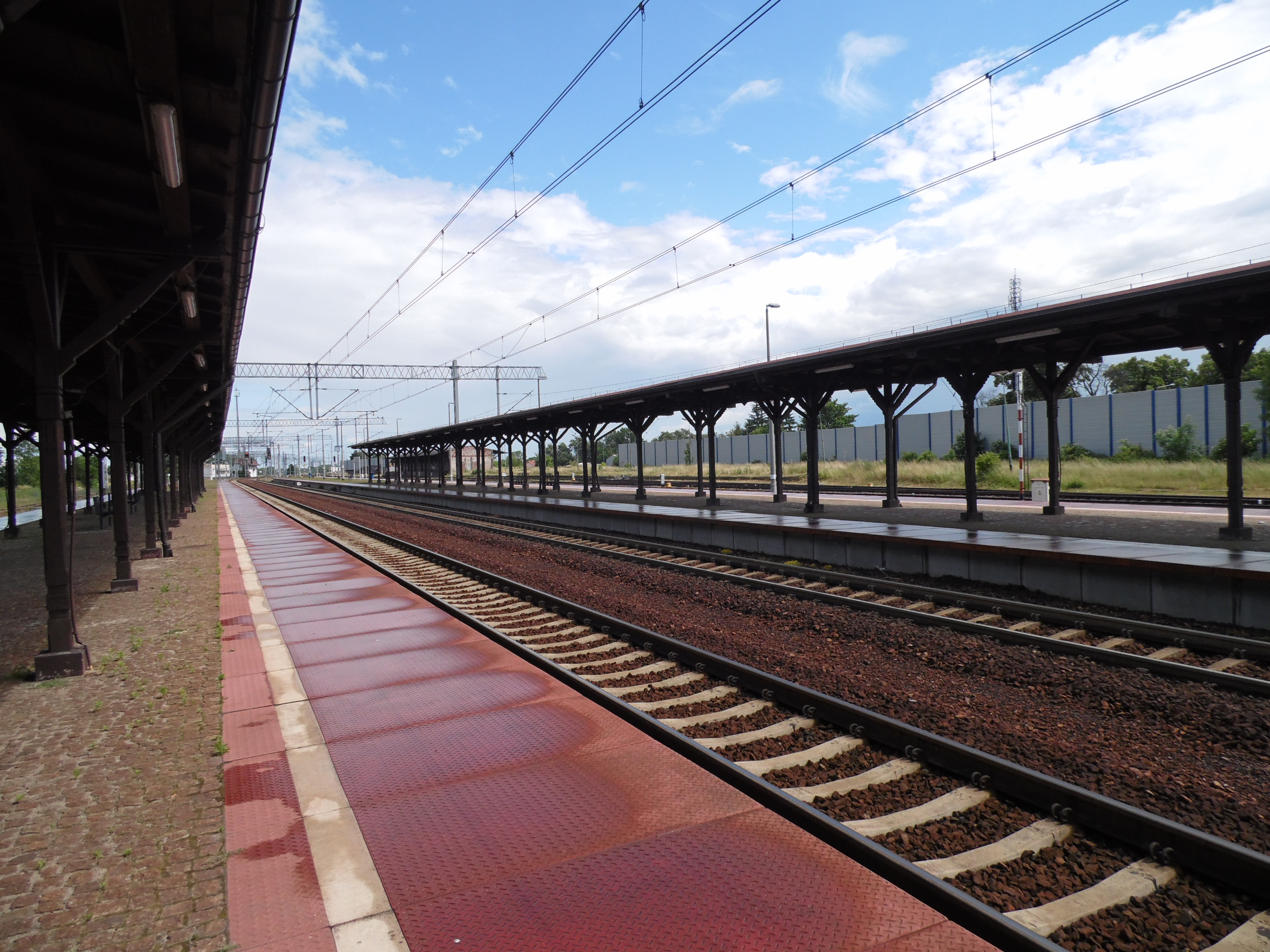

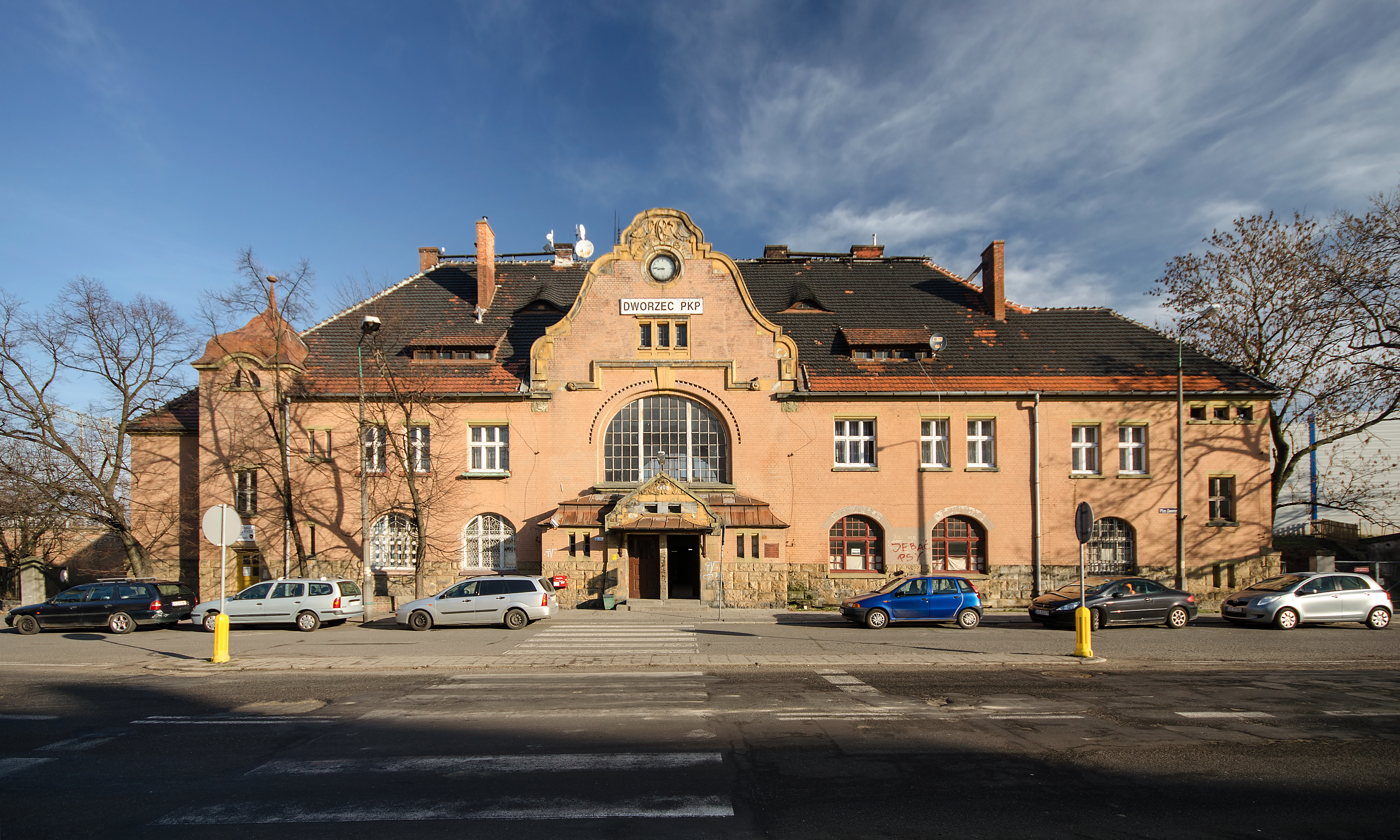
Station building prior to renovations

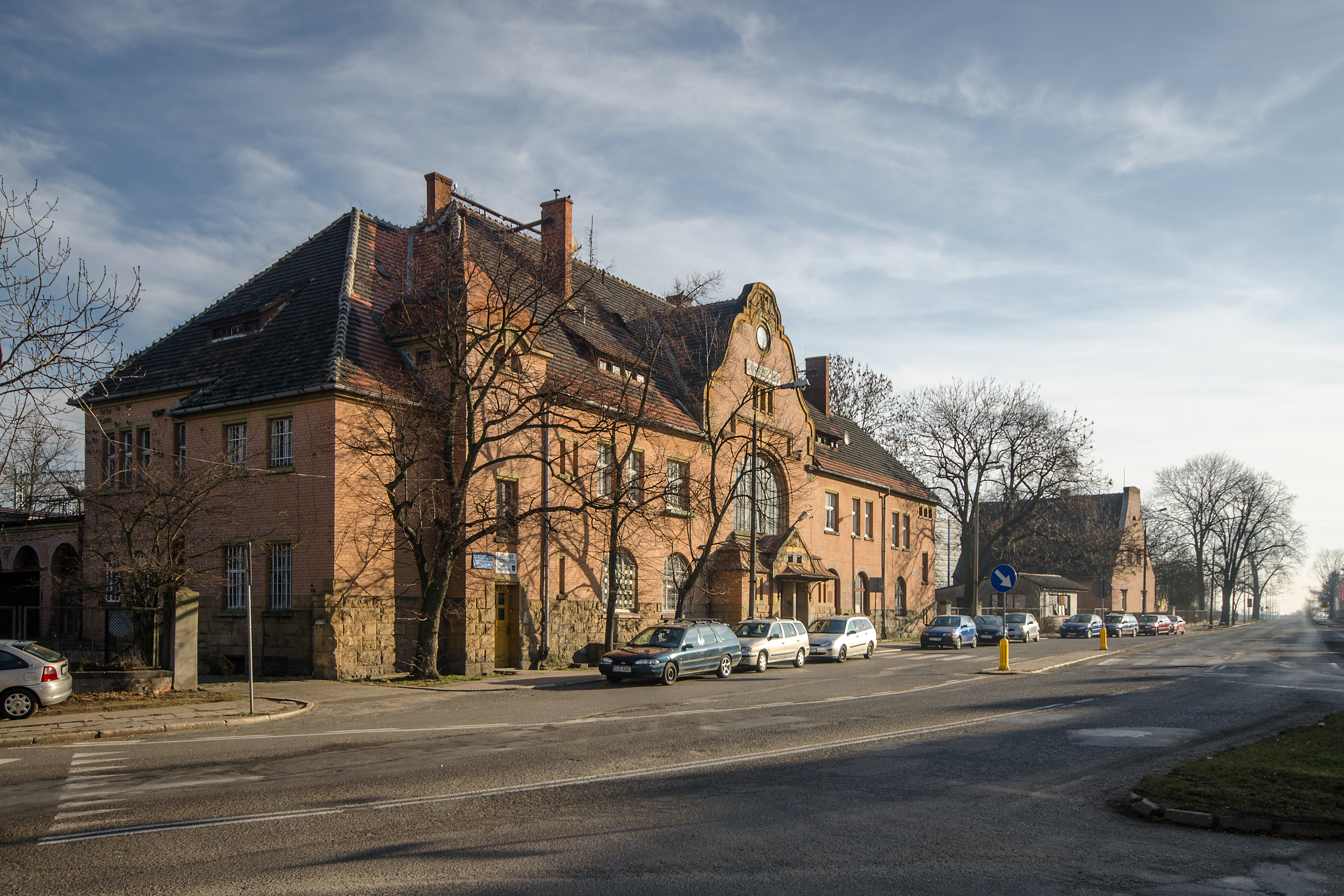

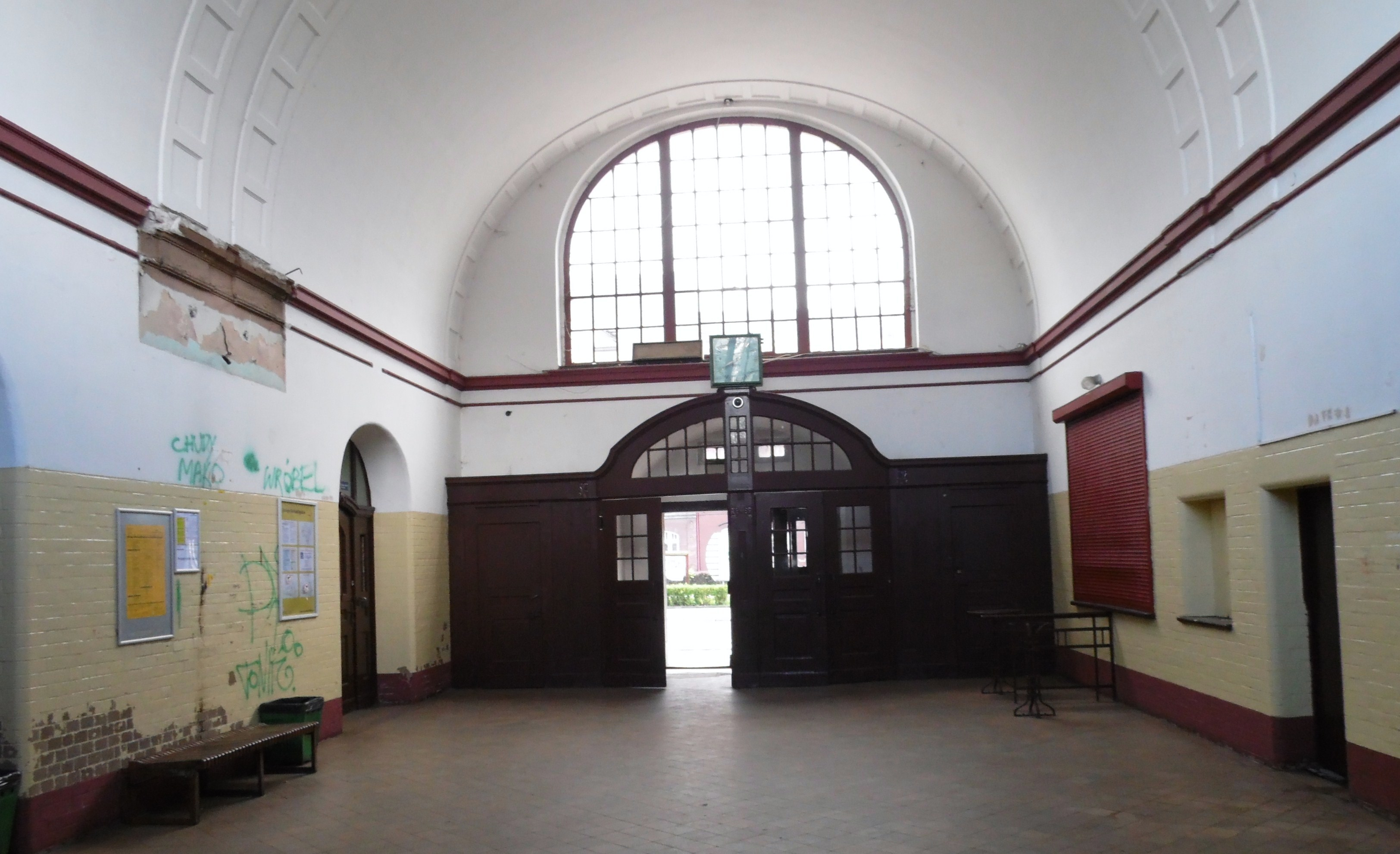
Ticket hall prior to renovations
