= Bolesławiec railway viaduct =

Bolesławiec railway viaduct Wiadukt kolejowy w Bolesławcu
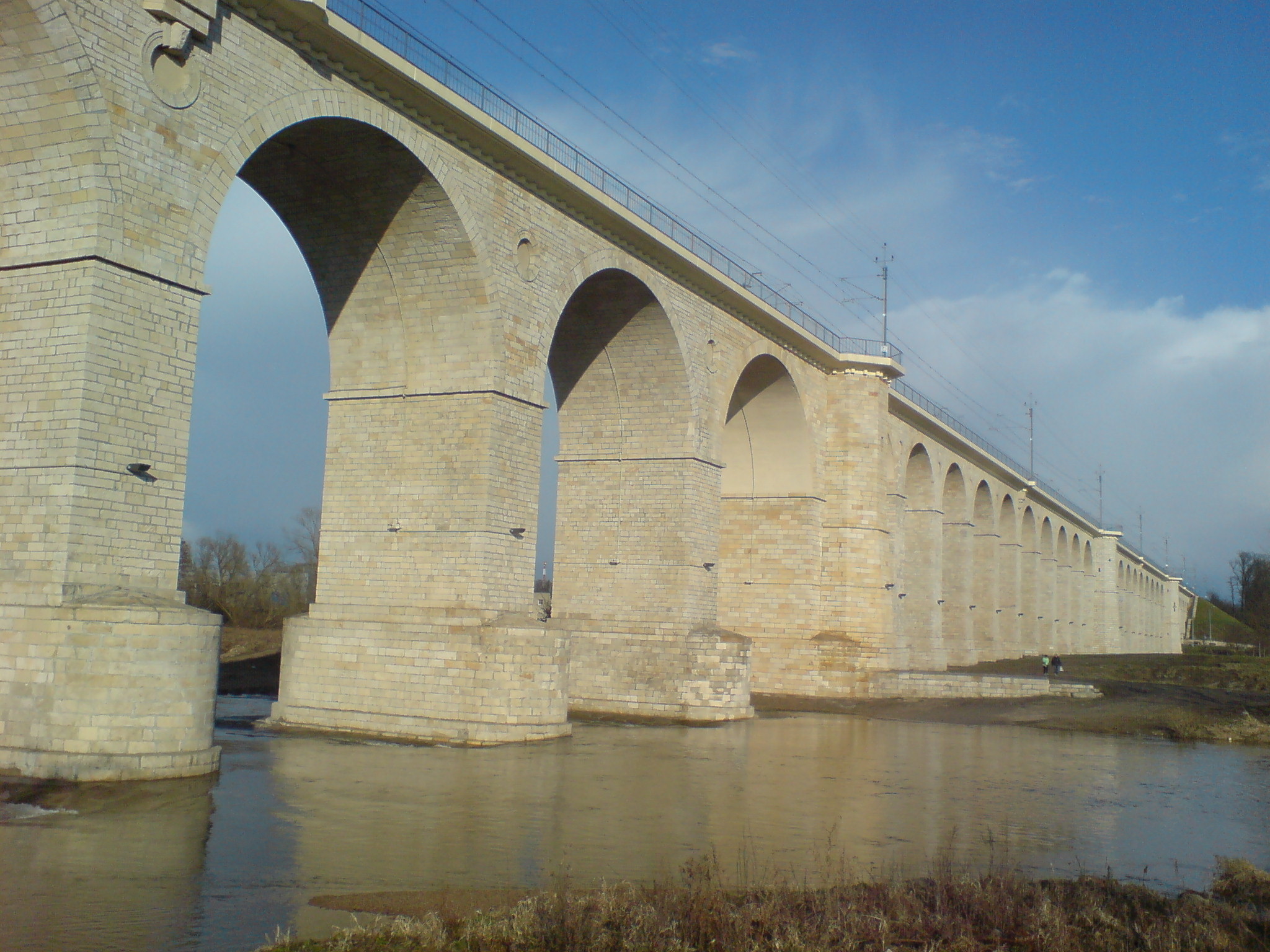
- The viaduct in 2010
- Coordinates: 51.2688100°N 15.5508700°E
- Carries: Rail
- Crosses: Bóbr River
- Locale: Bolesławiec, Poland
- Owner: Poland, managed by PKP

Characteristics
- Total length: 490 m
- Width: 8 m
- Longest span: 15 m
- No. of spans: 35

History
- Architect: Fryderyk Engelhardt Gansel
- Construction start: 1844
- Construction end: 1846

Location
- Interactive map of Bolesławiec railway viaduct

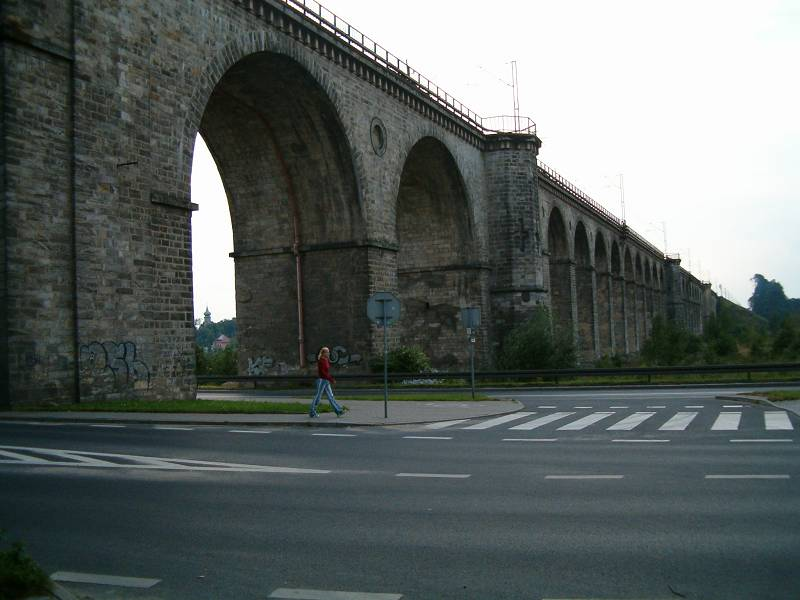
View of the viaduct in Bolesławiec

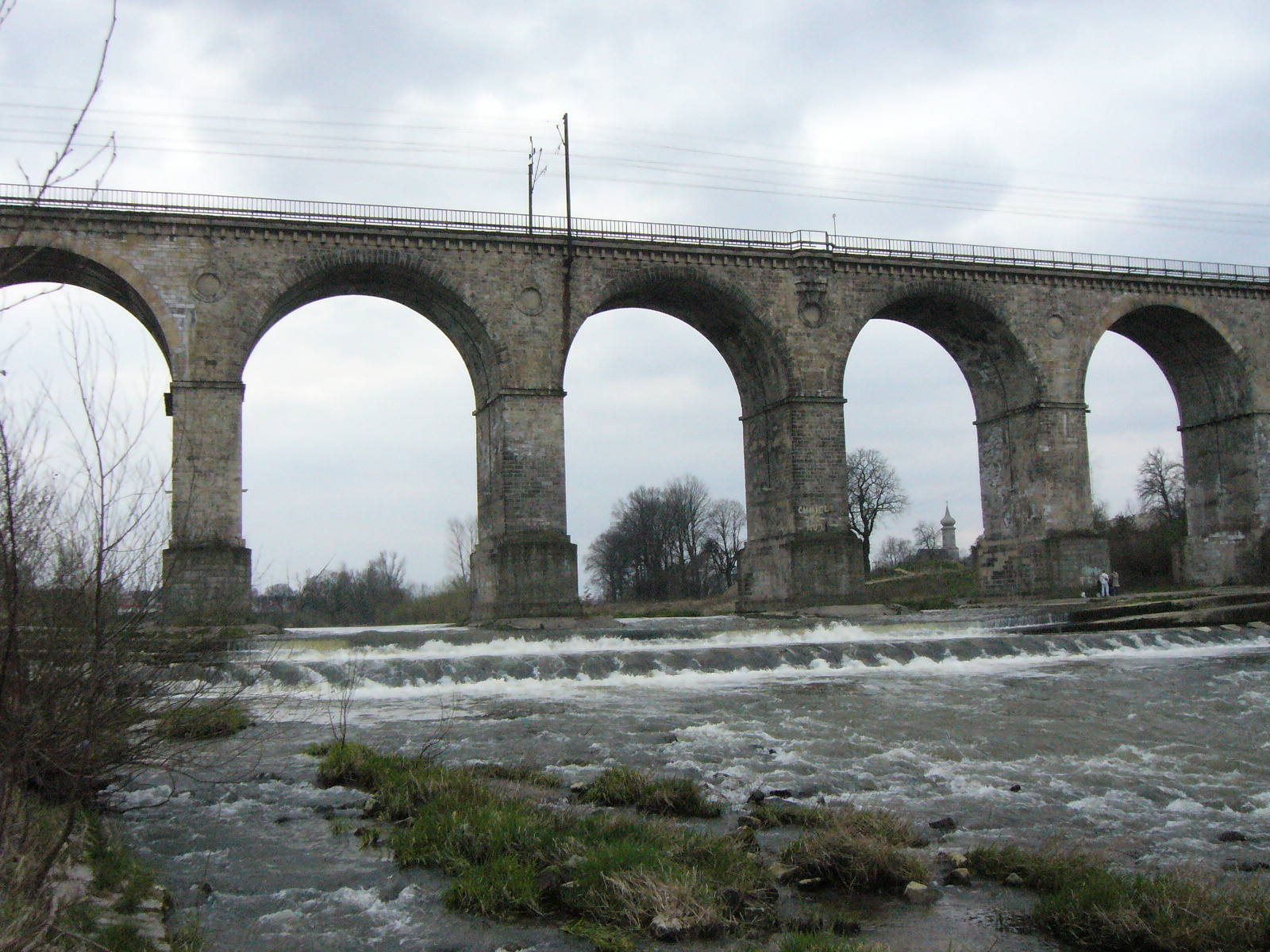
View of the viaduct crossing the river Bóbr

The Bolesławiec railway viaduct is a railway bridge over the river Bóbr in Bolesławiec in Lower Silesia, Poland.

Entirely made of stone, it is one of the longest bridges of its type in Poland and in Europe.

== Statistics ==
- Length: 490 m
- Height: 26 m
- Width: 8 m
- Number of spans: 35
- Main spans: 15 m, 11.5 m and 5.65 m
- Construction material: sandstone
- Construction period: 2 years
- Construction completion: 1846

== History ==
Rail transport came to Bolesławiec (then known as Bunzlau and part of Prussian Silesia) in 1845. Work was already being carried out on the extension of a rail line towards Węgliniec. Part of this work was a crossing of the river Bóbr. The Prussian architect Frederick Engelhardt Gansel was chosen for the project. Work began on 18 June 1844. Building work directly employed more than 600 people with another 3200 indirectly related to its construction. The construction took two years and was completed in July 1846.

Near the end of the war in 1945, retreating Germans blew up the central span crossing. After the war, reconstruction was fast and the bridge was returned to service in 1947.

In 2006, the viaduct was illuminated at the cost of nearly 180 thousand złoty. It is illuminated with 58 compact projectors which are mounted on the inner sides of the pillars of the bridge.

In October 2009, renovation work on the viaduct was completed. It had been sandblasted, its design completely renovated and maintained. In addition, the viaduct gained a new traction network, track layout, and rail extensions from both sides. Due to these upgrades, trains were able to travel up to 160 km/h.

=== Key dates ===
- 17.05.1844 - the foundation stone was laid for the construction of the viaduct
- 18.06.1844 - start of construction
- 05.07.1846 - completion of construction
- 01.09.1846 - scheduled to start moving trains
- 17.09.1846 - the official grand opening of the viaduct made by King Frederick William IV
- 10.02.1945 - the retreating German army blew up one of the spans of the viaduct and three of its vaults
- 10.10.2009 - the official dedication of the viaduct after renovation with a light and sound show
