= Miłkowice–Jasień railway =

Railway line in south-western Poland

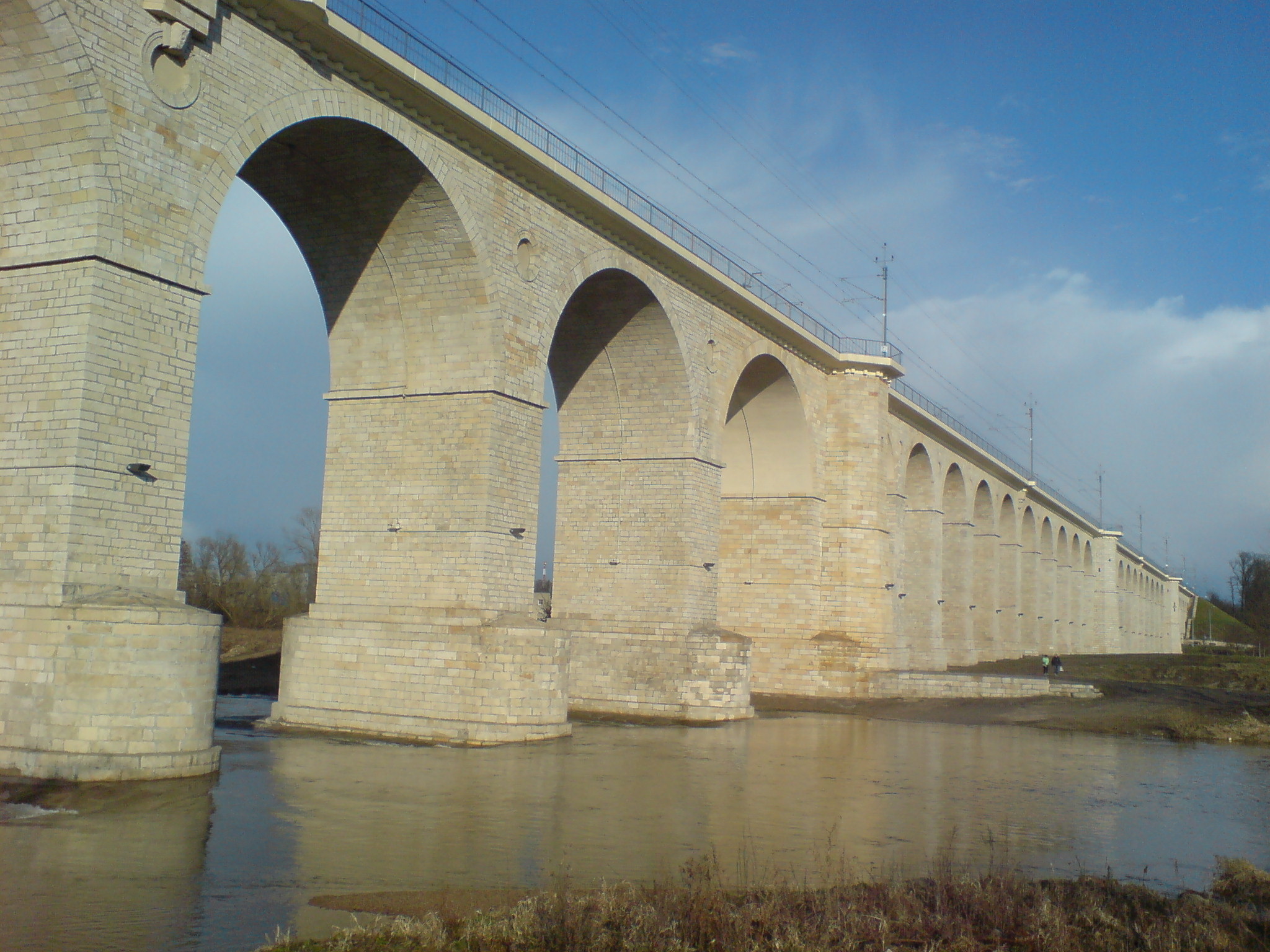
- Bolesławiec rail viaduct

Overview
- Line number: 282
- Locale: Lower Silesian Voivodeship; Lubusz Voivodeship
- Termini: Miłkowice; Żary

History
- Opened: 1845 (first section)
- Electrified: 1985

Technical
- Line length: 103.622 km (64.388 mi)
- Number of tracks: 2 (1 between Węgliniec and Żary)
- Track gauge: 1,435 mm (4 ft 8 1/2 in) standard gauge
- Electrification: Overhead catenary (Miłkowice–Węgliniec)
- Operating speed: 160 km/h (99 mph)
Route map
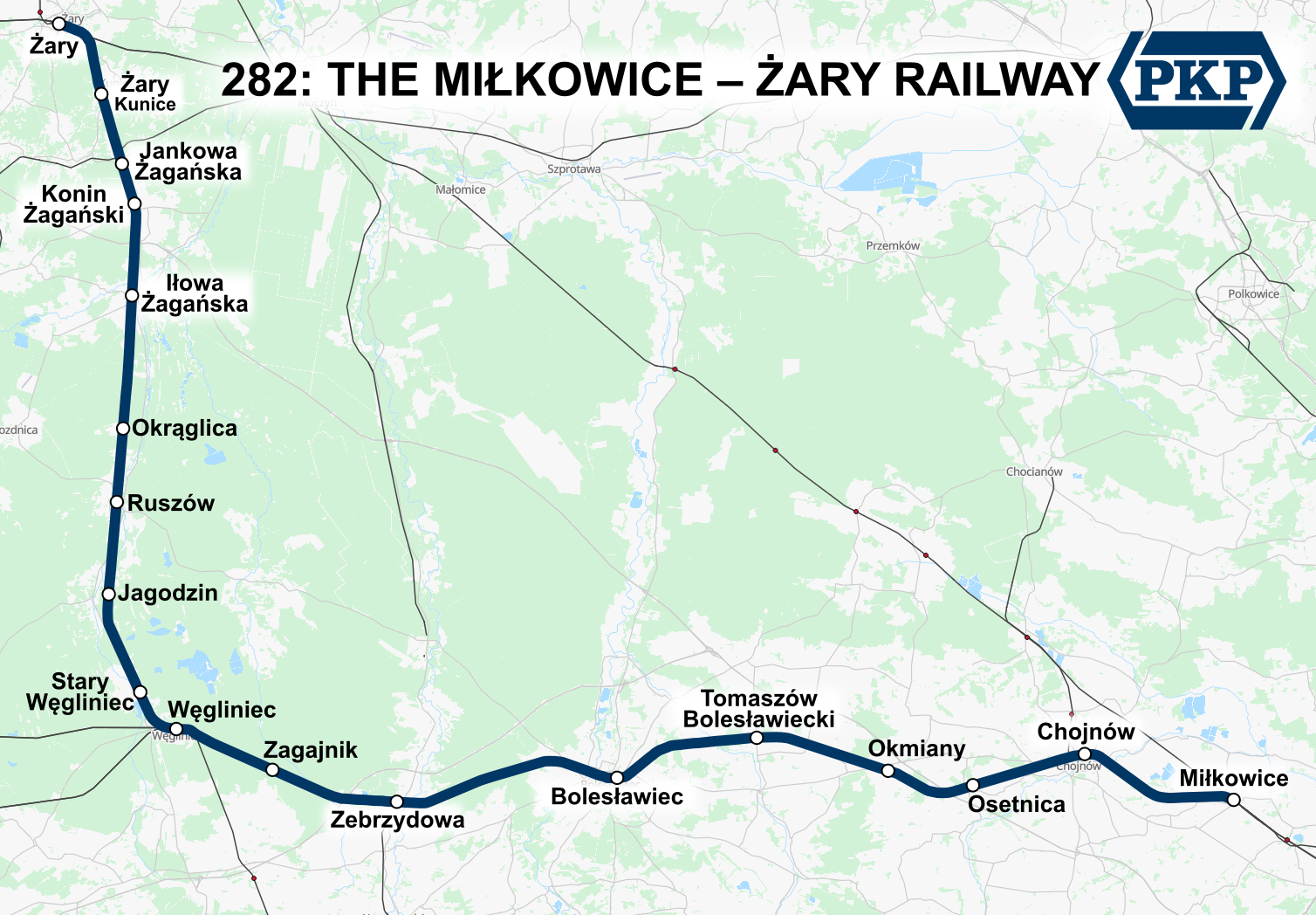

The Miłkowice–Jasień railway, or the Miłkowice–Żary railway is a double-track and single-track railway connecting Miłkowice railway station in Miłkowice and Żary railway station in Żary. The section between Jasień and Żary has been closed since 1992.

== History ==
=== Pre World War II ===
The first section of the line opened on 1 October 1845, between Legnica and Bolesławiec, part of the Berlin–Wrocław railway. In 1846 the line was extended to Żary via Węgliniec. On 15 May 1875, the line to Jasień via Żary opened as a 93 km (58 mi) long branch off Bolesławiec.

This line was about 30 km (19 mi) shorter than the line it replaced, "Berlinka" to Żary but via Węgliniec. During this time, the line was still a double-track railway.

On 3 February 1942, a potbelly stove in a locomotive overheated and exploded on the section between Miłkowice and Węgliniec. 20 people died and 15 were injured.

=== Post World War II ===
After World War II, the area came under Polish administration. As a result, the line was taken over by Polish State Railways. One of lines of track between Węgliniec and Żary were dismantled by the Red Army under 'war reparations' of World War II. The line is still single-track today.

On 21 December 1985, electrification of the section between Miłkowice and Węgliniec was completed, while in 1990 the section between Węgliniec and Żary underwent major track modernisation.

The section between Żary and Jasień was closed in 1992. Tracks were dismantled in 2000.

Between 2005 and 2008, the Miłkowice–Węgliniec section, which is part of the E30 main line, underwent a complete overhaul and modernisation of the line. The modernisation covered stations, tracks, signalling systems, level crossings, and overhead wires, as well as the construction of modern LCS-type signal boxes.

Since the completion of the E30 modernization on the Miłkowice–Węgliniec section, all passenger trains have been able to reach a maximum speed of up to 160 km/h (99 mph), and freight trains up to 120 km/h (75 mph).

== Train services ==
The line is served by the following services:

- Intercity services (IC) Zgorzelec - Legnica - Wrocław - Ostrów Wielkopolski - Łódź - Warszawa
- Regional services (KD) Lubań Sląski - Węgliniec - Legnica - Wrocław
- Regional services (KD) Berlin - Cottbus - Węgliniec - Legnica - Wrocław (only on weekends)
- Regional services (KD) Wrocław - Legnica - Żary - Forst
- Regional services (KD) Legnica - Chojnów - Chocianów
- Regional services (R) Görlitz/Zgorzelec - Węgliniec - Żary - Zielona Góra

== Gallery ==
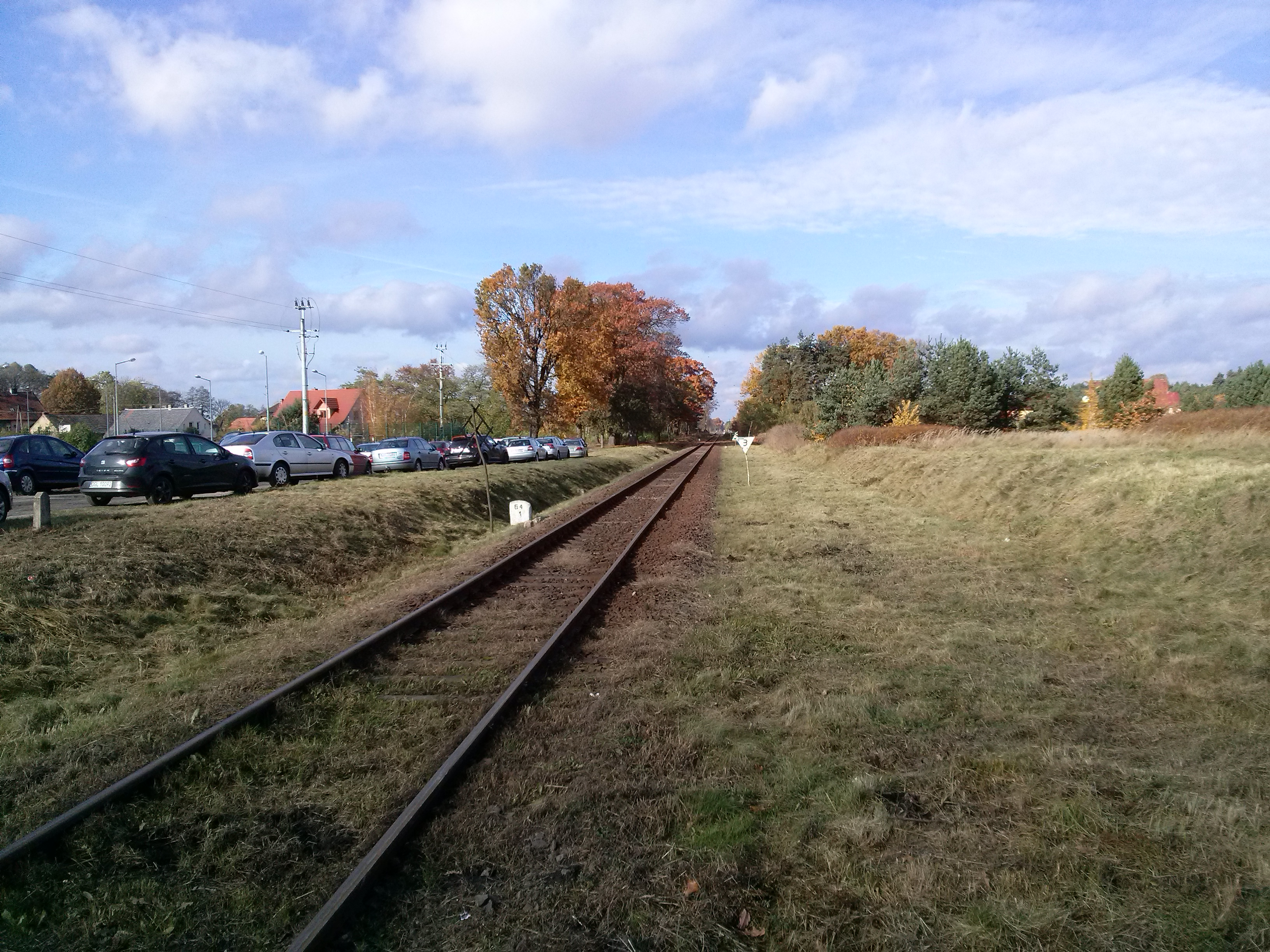
Railway line near Stary Węgliniec

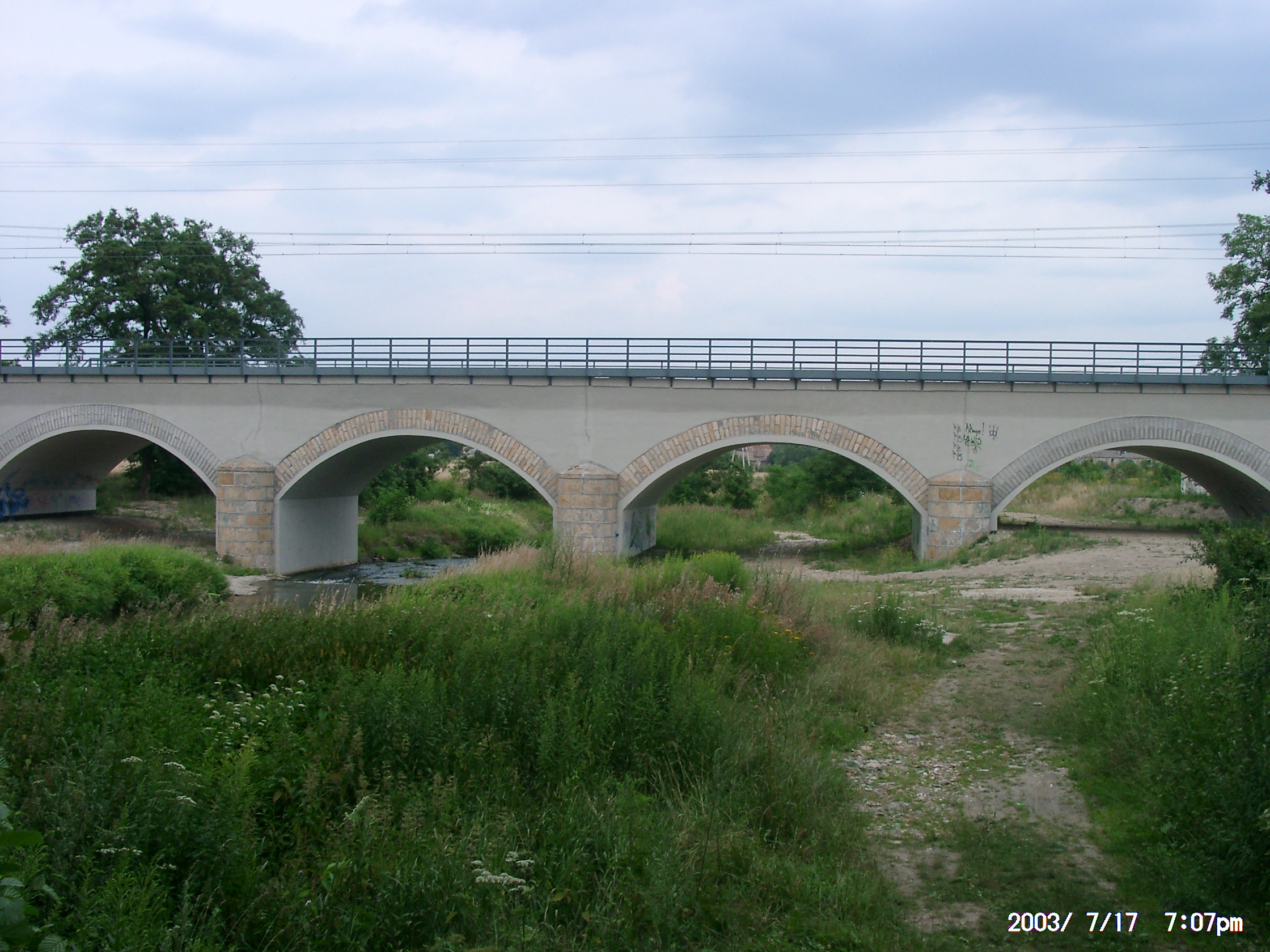
Railway bridge near Chojnów

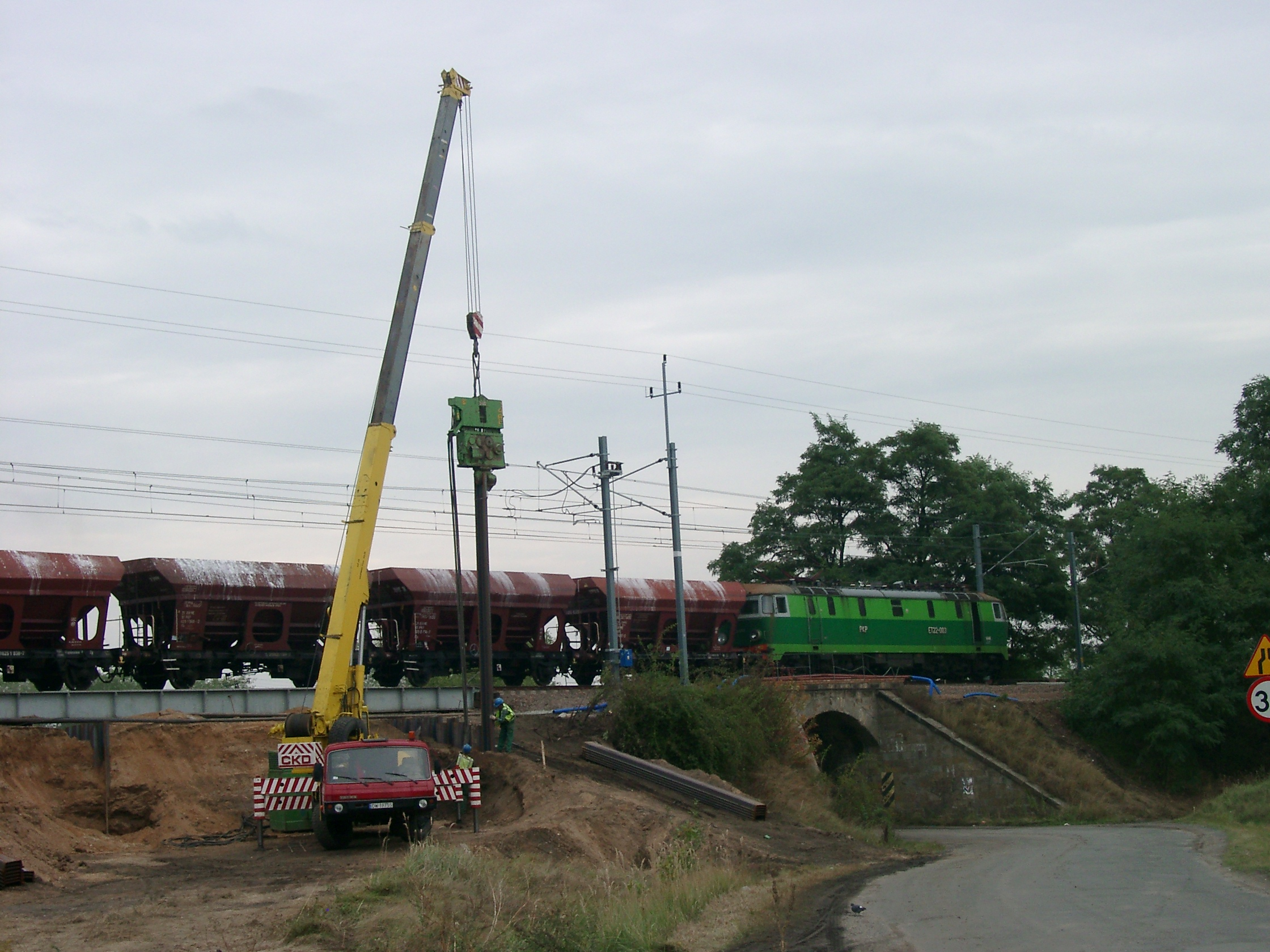
Modernisation works of the line near Chojnów in 2005

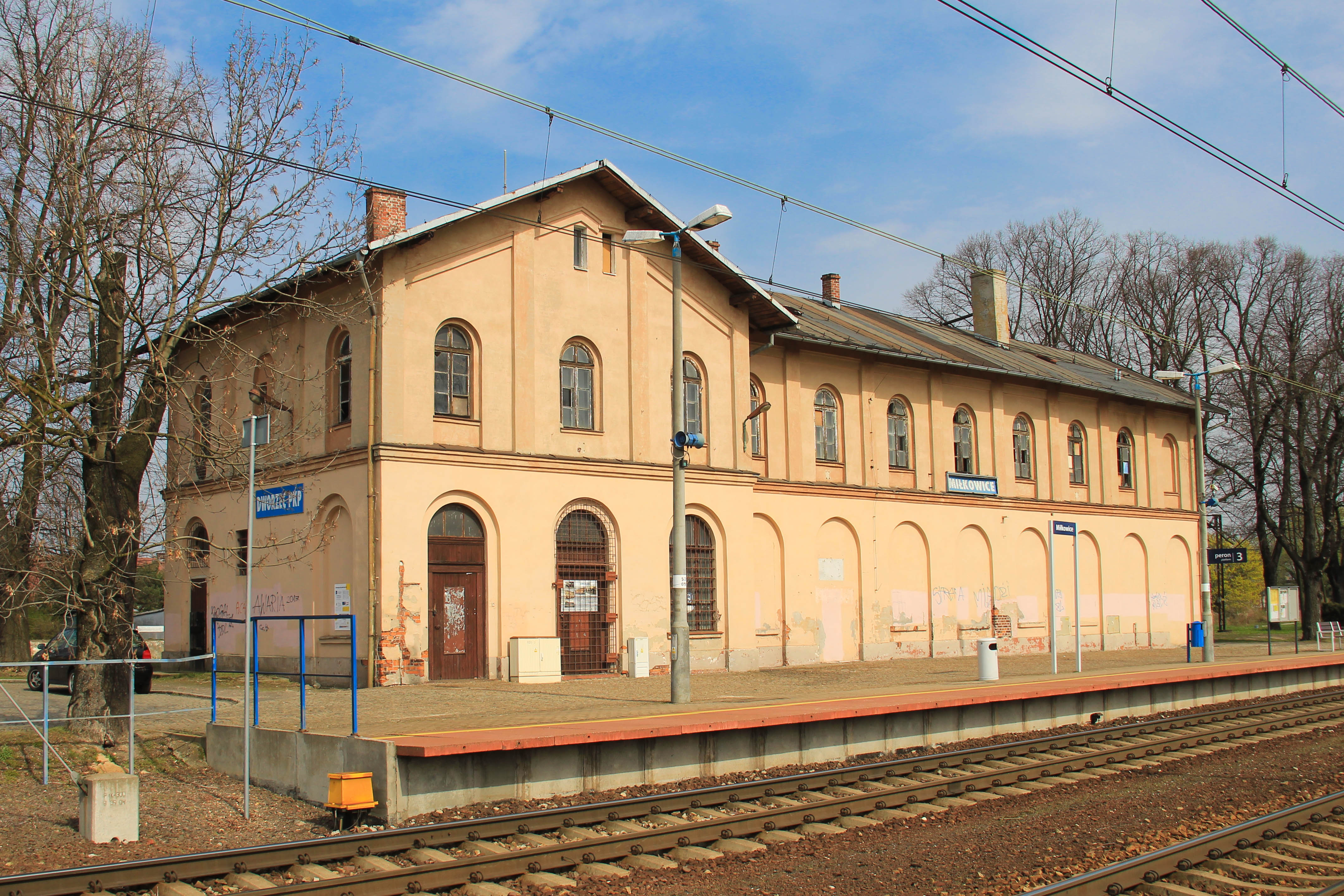
Miłkowice railway station

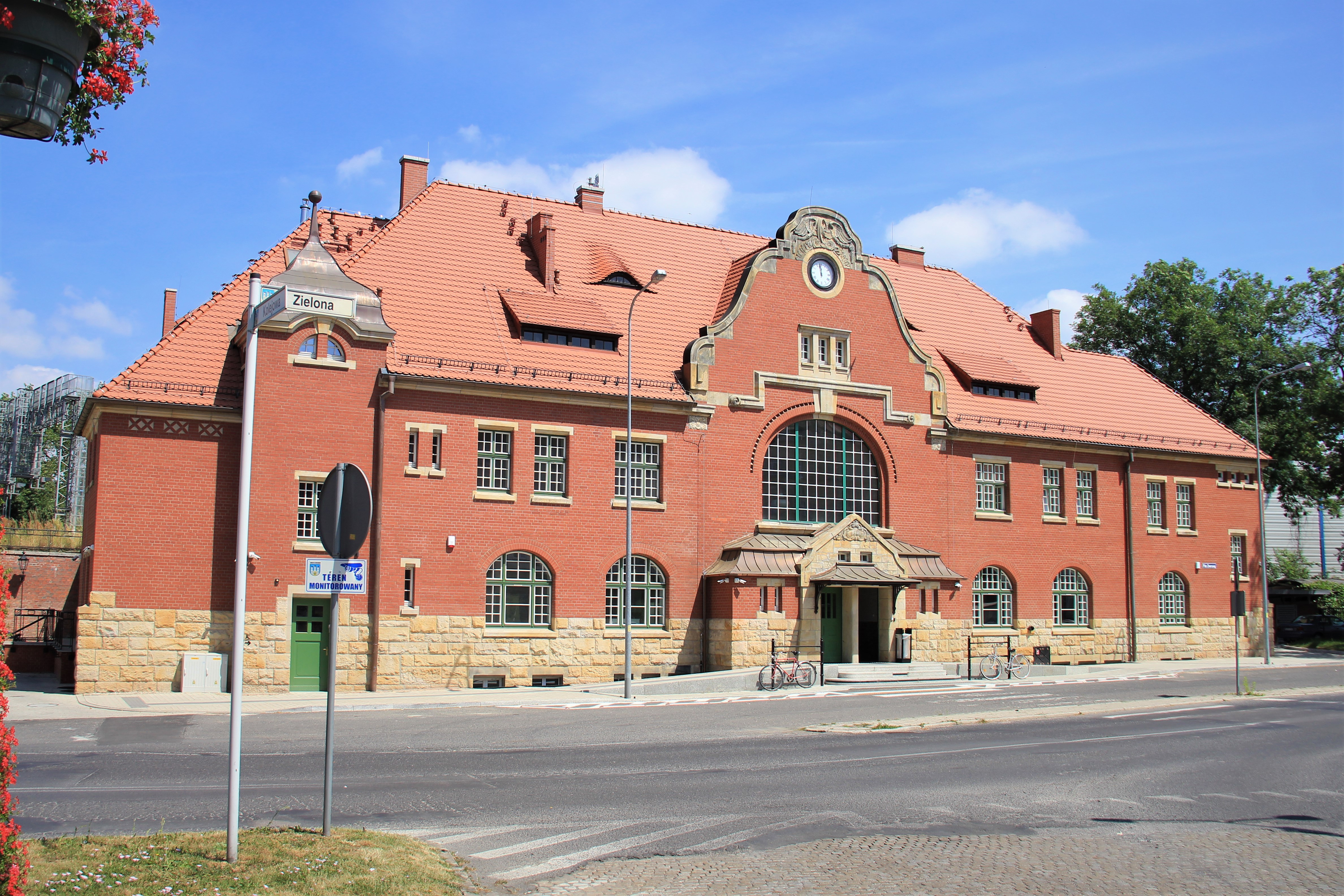
Chojnów railway station

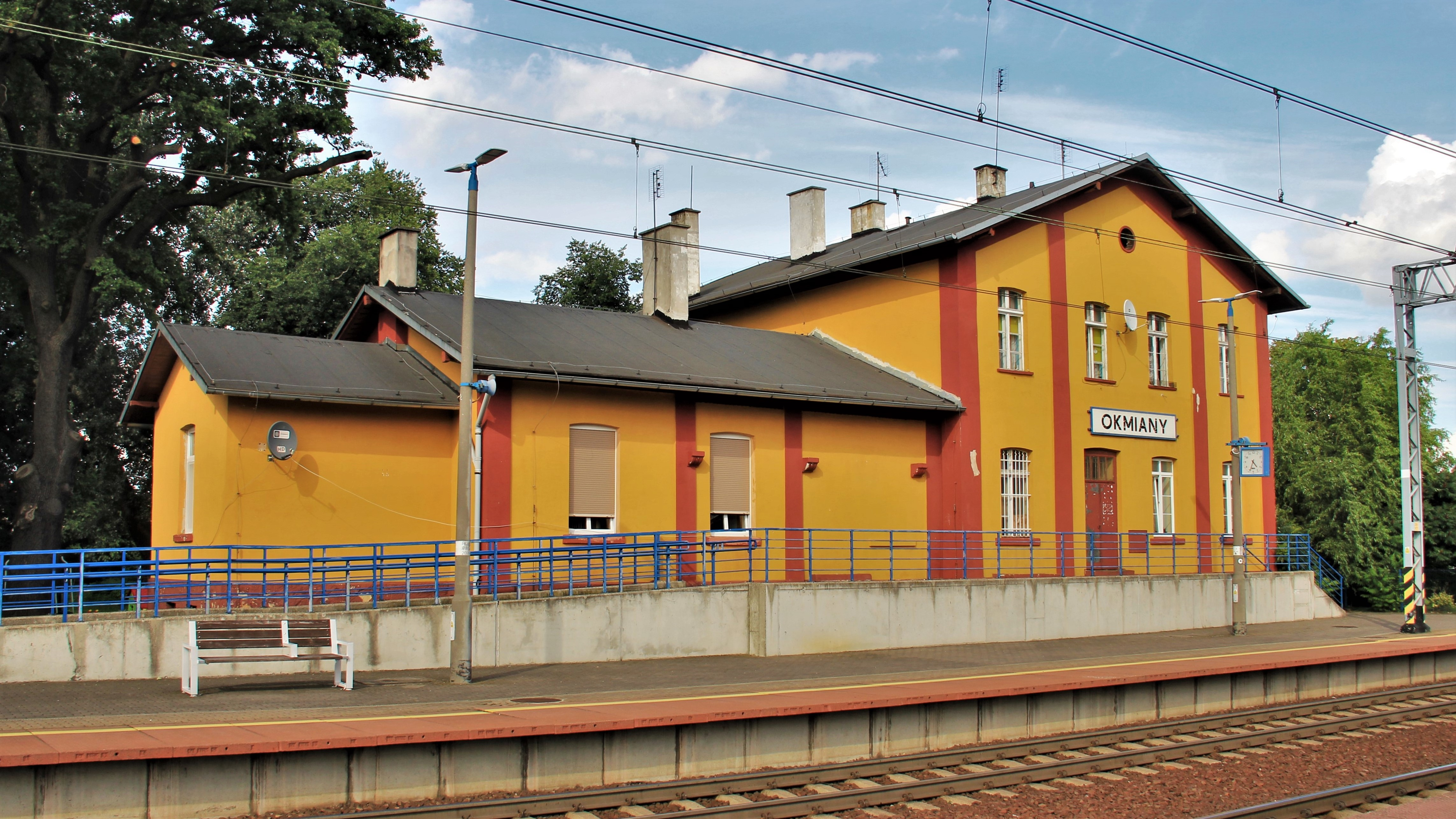
Okmiany railway station

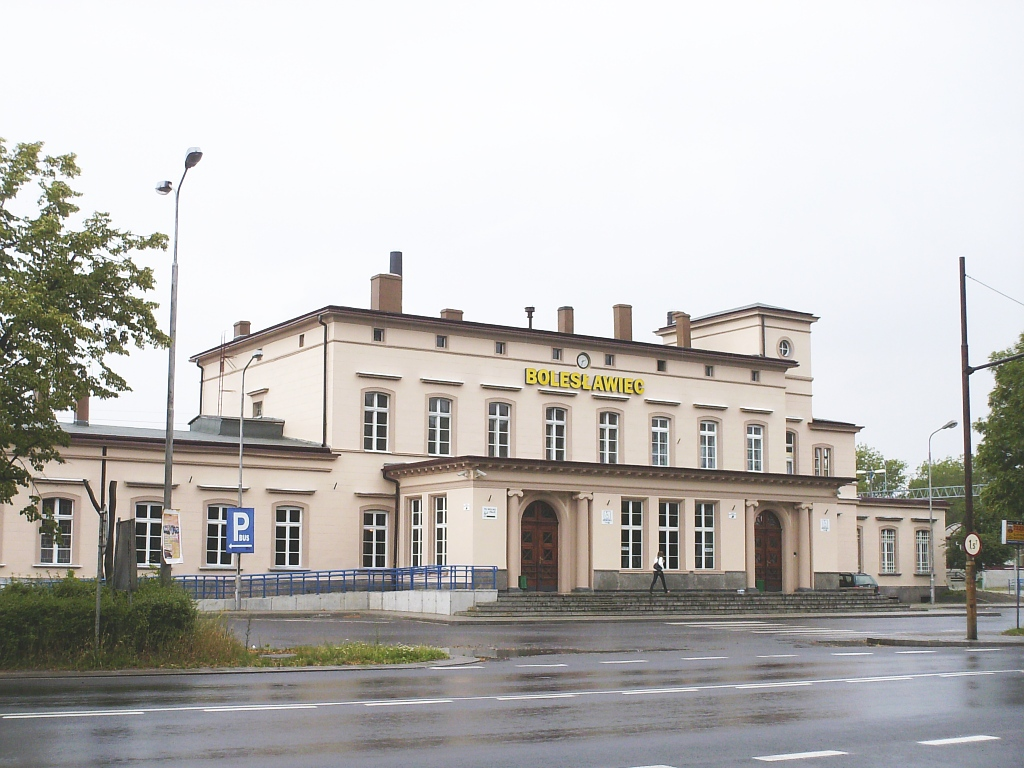
Bolesławiec railway station

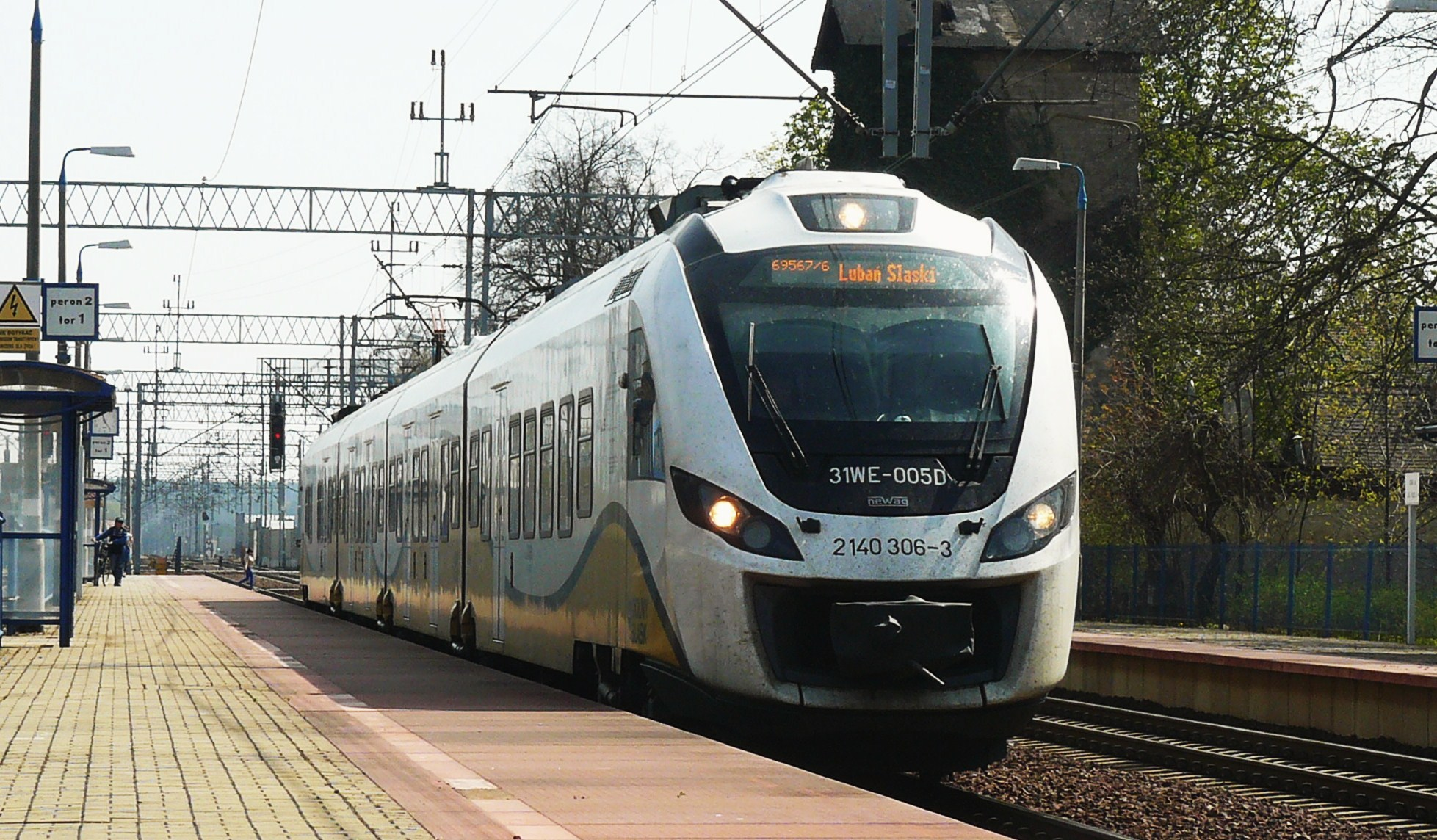
Lower Silesian Railways 31WE at Zebrzydowa bound for Lubań Śląski

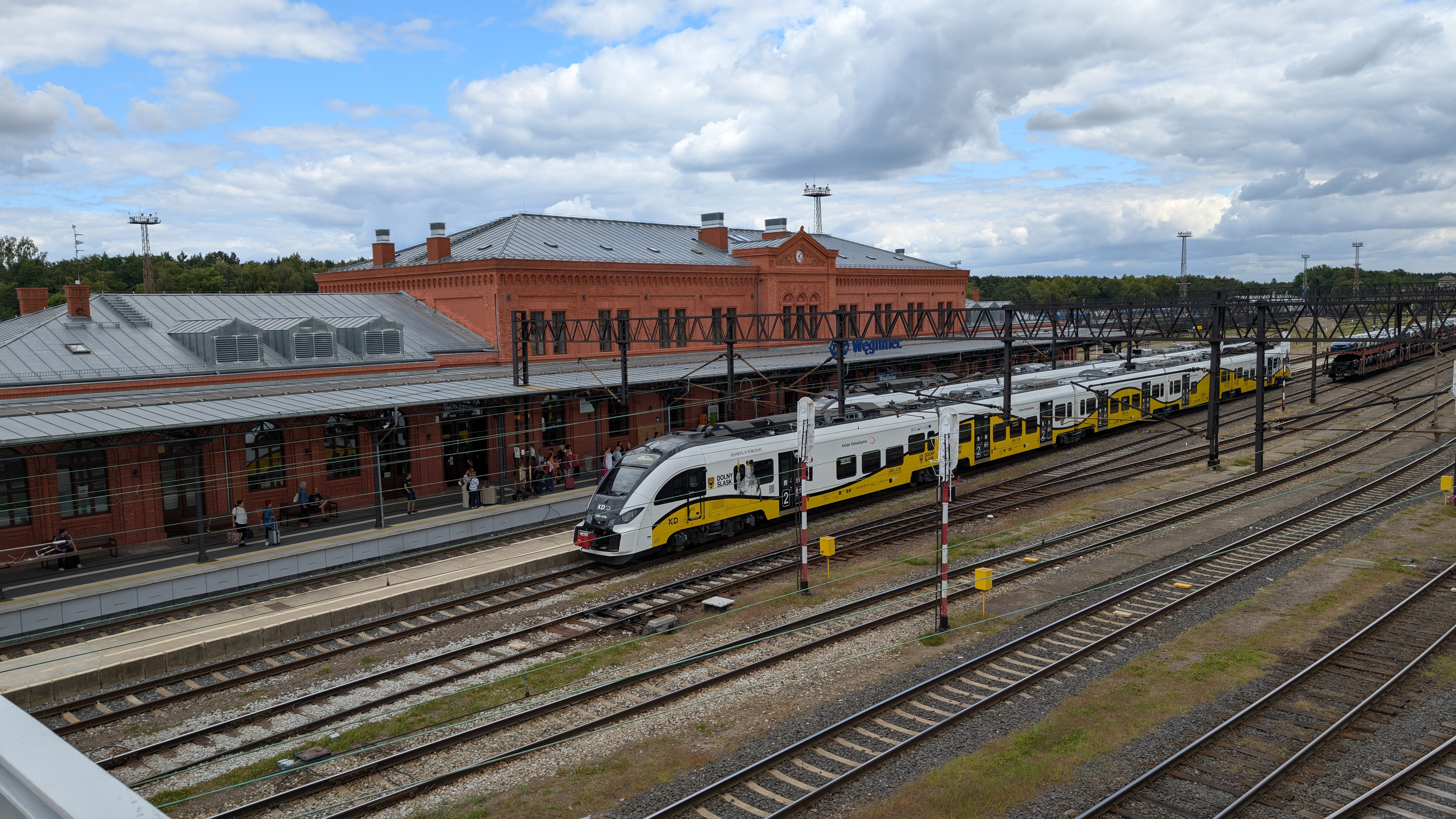
Węgliniec railway station

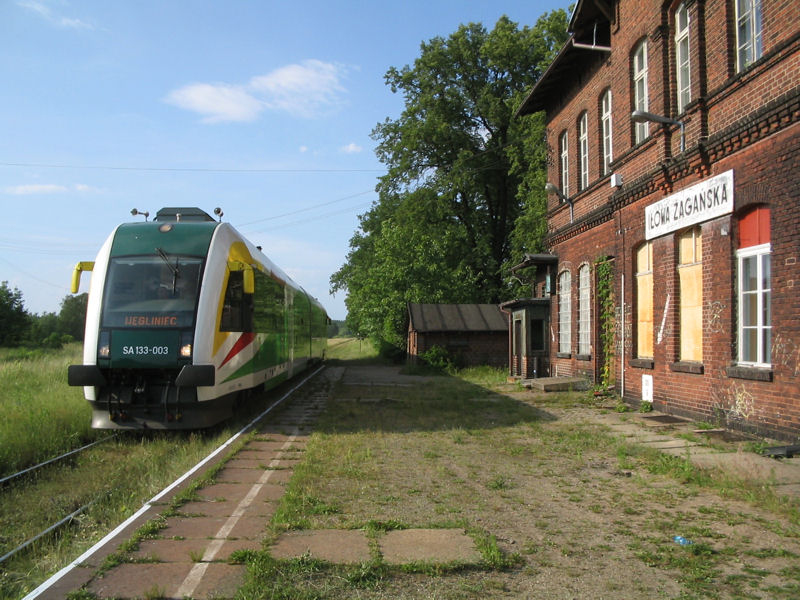
Railbus SA133 at Iłowa Żagańska bound for Węgliniec

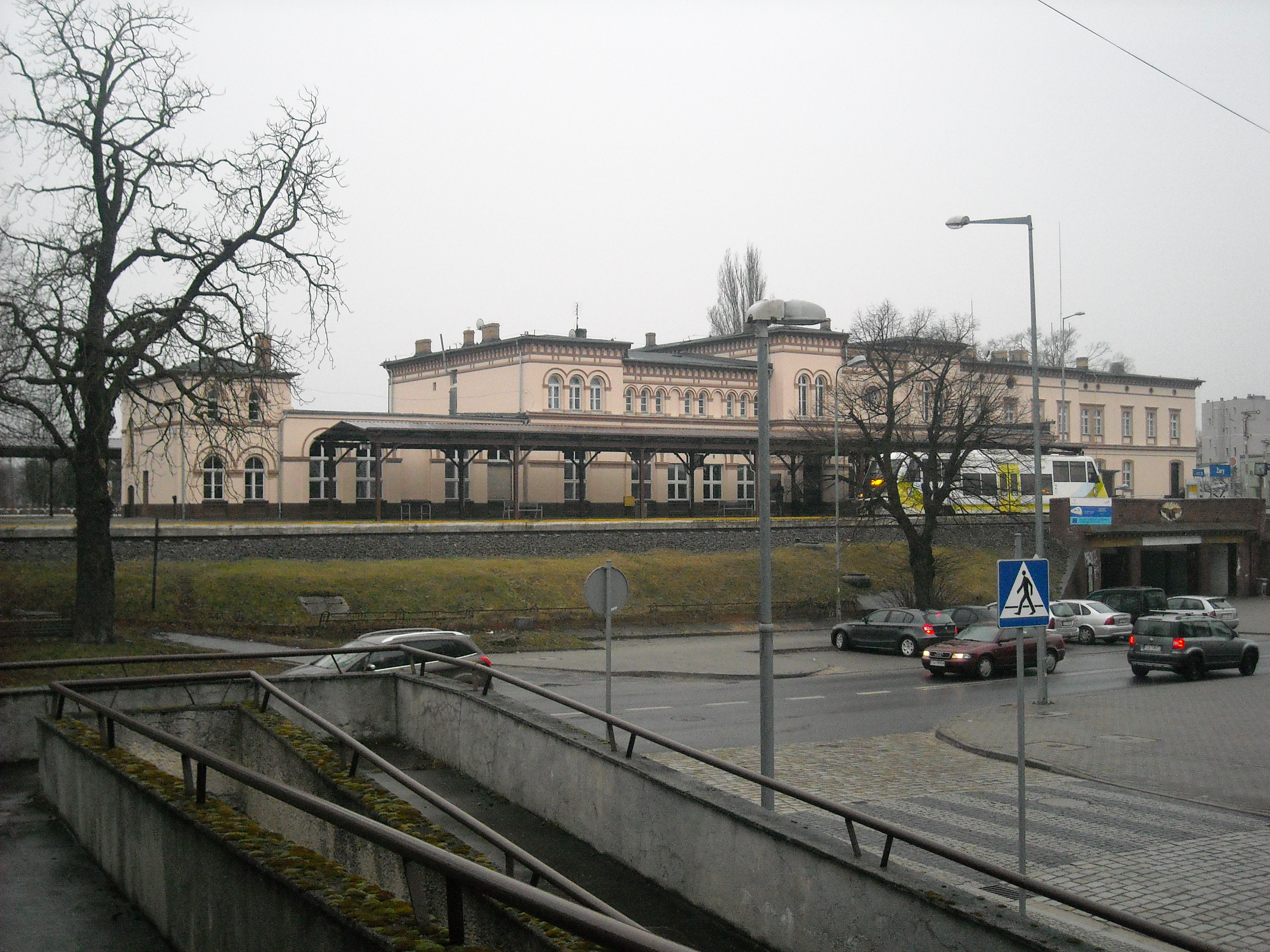
Żary railway station
