= Ruszów Szklarnia railway station =

Abandoned railway station in south-western Poland

Ruszów Szklarnia
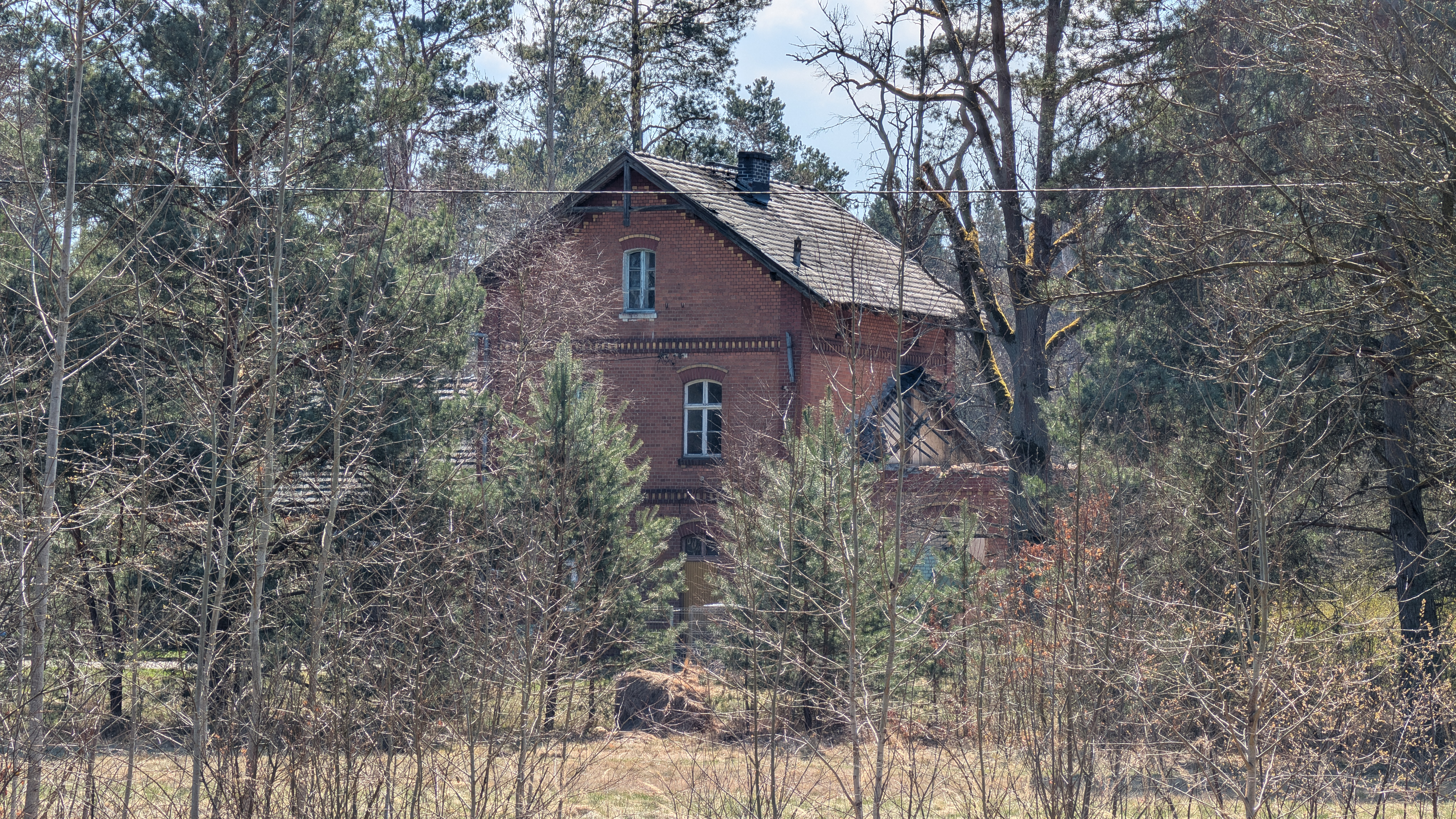
- Former station building in 2026

General information
- Location: Ruszów, Lower Silesian Voivodeship; Poland
- Coordinates: 51°24′42.1″N 15°09′46.1″E
- Line: Ruszów–Gozdnica railway (closed)
- Platforms: 1
- Train operators: Lusatian Railway Company (1896–1939); Deutsche Reichsbahn (1939–1945); Polish State Railways (1947–1962)

History
- Opened: 1 December 1896
- Closed: 26 October 1962
- Former names: Glashütte Rauscha (before 1945); Szklarka Ruszowska (1945–1947)
Location
- Location within Poland

Ruszów Szklarnia lit. 'Ruszów Glassworks' (German: Glashütte Rauscha) is an abandoned railway station in the village of Ruszów, Zgorzelec County, within the Lower Silesian Voivodeship in south-western Poland.

The station has been abandoned since the 2006 closure of the Ruszów–Gozdnica railway.

== History ==
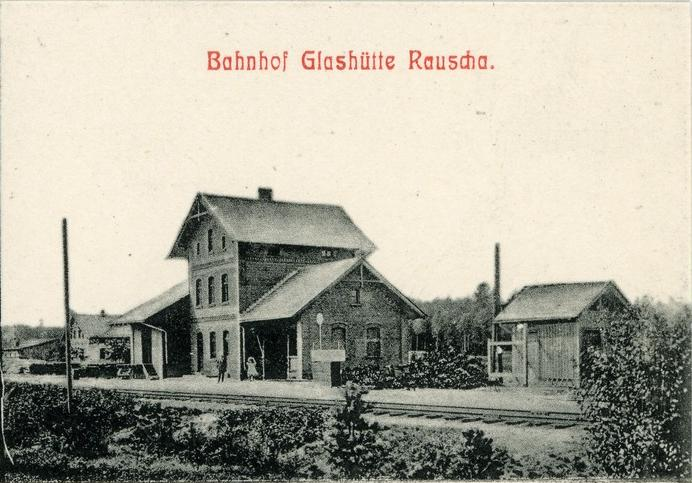
Station in 1910

The station was opened by the Lusatian Railway Company as Glashütte Rauscha on 1 December 1896, part of the Ruszów–Gozdnica railway. The station was mainly a cargo terminal, but was still served by passenger trains.

Two narrow-gauge railway lines, once branched off the station into brickyards. One line ran to Kościelna Wieś (Kamienna brickyard), which was operated by diesel locomotives, and the other line ran to Okrąglica (Rychlinek brickyard), which was electrified. Both lines operated until World War II.

Two standard-gauge railway lines also branched off the station to glassworks and a sawmill, which were later converted to railway sidings in the 1950s.

After World War II, the area was placed under Polish administration. In the summer of 1945, the Red Army dismantled the tracks of the whole line to under 'war reparations'. As a result, the station was closed, until 1947, when the Ruszów–Gozdnica railway was rebuilt by Polish State Railways.

The station reopened on 4 May 1947 as Ruszów Szklarnia, under Polish State Railways. Two passenger trains called at the station daily, one in the morning, and one in the evening. It was still mainly used by freight trains.

Passenger trains continued to call at the station until their withdrawal on 26 October 1962. Freight trains continued to operate until 1999. The line was then fully closed in 2006. The final section of abandoned the narrow-gauge railway lines, which crossed voivodeship road 350 were dismantled in March 2026 for the repaving of the 400 m (1,300 ft) section.

== Former services ==
Preceding station	Disused railways	Following station
Ruszów; Terminus	Polish State Railways; Ruszów–Gozdnica	Dębiny towards Gozdnica

== See also ==
- Ruszów railway station
- Ruszów–Gozdnica railway
