= Polana, Lower Silesian Voivodeship =

Polana
- Village
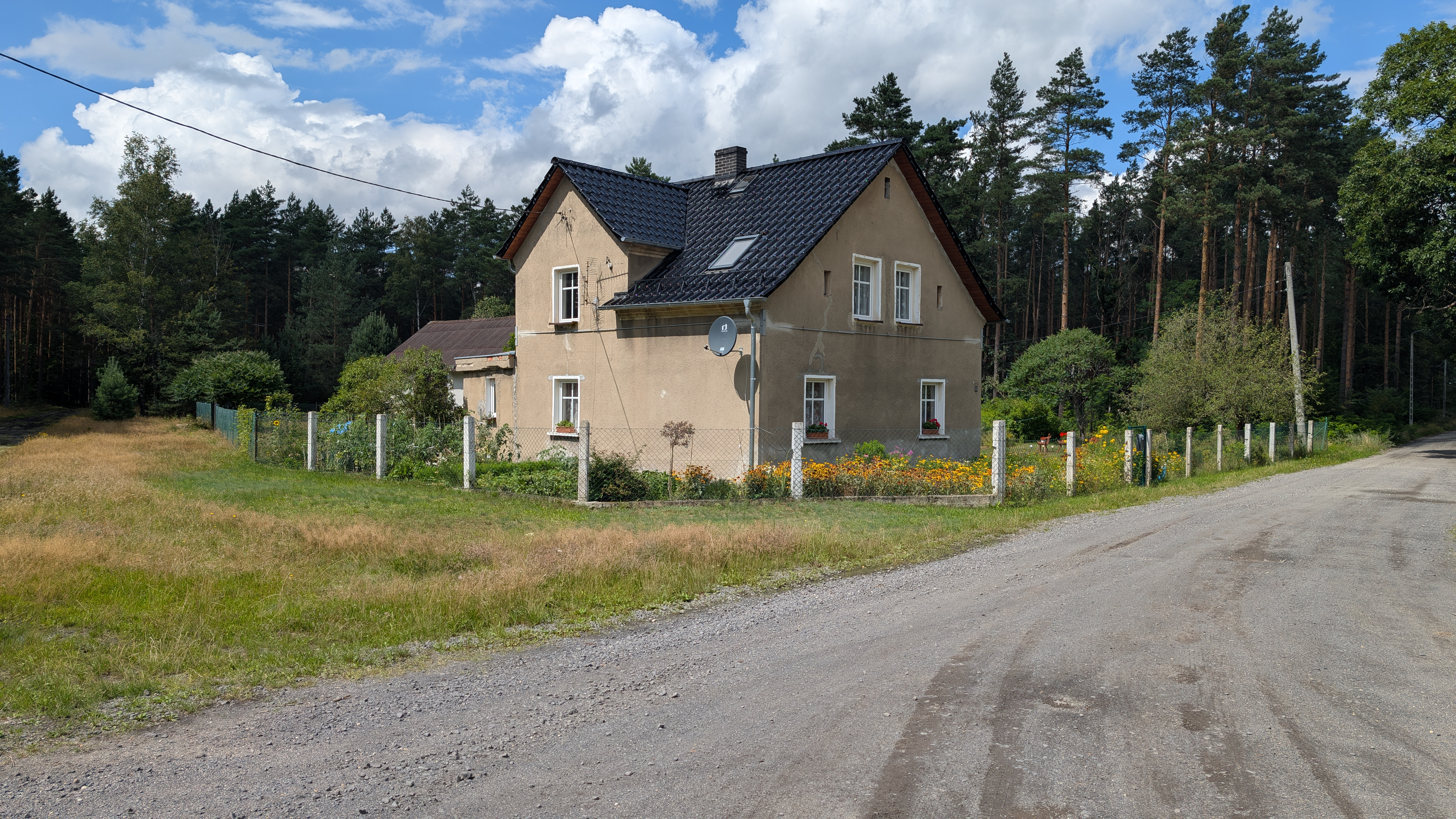
- House in Polana

- Location within Poland
- Coordinates: 51°23′49″N 15°05′29″E
- Country: Poland
- Voivodeship: Lower Silesian
- County: Zgorzelec
- Gmina: Węgliniec
- Founded: 18th century
- Elevation: 161 m (528 ft)
- Population (2024): 50
- Time zone: UTC+1 (CET)
  - Summer (DST): UTC+2 (CEST)
- Postal code: 59-950
- Area code: +48 75
- Vehicle registration: DZG

Polana, [pɔˈlana] formerly Zapałów (German: Brand or Kolonie Brand; Upper Sorbian: Swětlina) is a village in the Lower Silesian Forest, located in the administrative district of Gmina Węgliniec, within Zgorzelec County, Lower Silesian Voivodeship, in south-western Poland.

Polana is administratively part of Ruszów.

== Name ==
Before World War II, the name of the village was Brand. The German noun translates to "fire", or "blaze". This name was given after the forest fire in 1712, as after the fire, the village was established and built on the site of the burnt forest. As early as 1932, the name was changed to Kolonie Brand. This was because the village administratively became part of another village, Ruszów.

During World War II, the Second Polish Army used the name Zapałów. This was a translation from the previous German name, Brand. The name Zapałów was used for a few more years, and was eventually changed to Polana, the modern name in use today. Despite this, the name Zapałów is still sometimes used by locals to this day.

== History ==
=== Pre World War II ===
The village was established as Brand after a forest fire in 1712. It is estimated that the fire destroyed around 100 hectares of forest. The local government of Zgorzelec decided to not replant the burnt forest, and instead used the space to create pastures, and herd sheep. Soon, buildings were constructed, including a forester's lodge. The settlement was named Brand. In 1721, a tar kiln was put into operation here. On 17 August 1774, this kiln exploded but was quickly rebuilt.

By 1817, the village had 18 farms and a population of 81. In 1856, the tar kiln was acquired by the Schlobach & Schmidt company, which later built a second tar kiln. The firm also owned three tar kilns and produced charcoal and turpentine in the nearby village of Jagodzin. As the village grew more, a school was established in building no. 12 for the children residing in the village.

Since as early as 1932, Polana was administratively part of Ruszów, hence why the name Kolonie Brand was used instead of Brand. Due to the border changes after World War II, the area was placed under Polish administration, according to the Potsdam Agreement. All remaining Germans were expelled from the village. The village was temporarily renamed to Zapałów, which was translated from the German name Brand, which meant "fire". Zapałów was also the codename of the village used by the Second Polish Army during World War II.

=== Post World War II ===
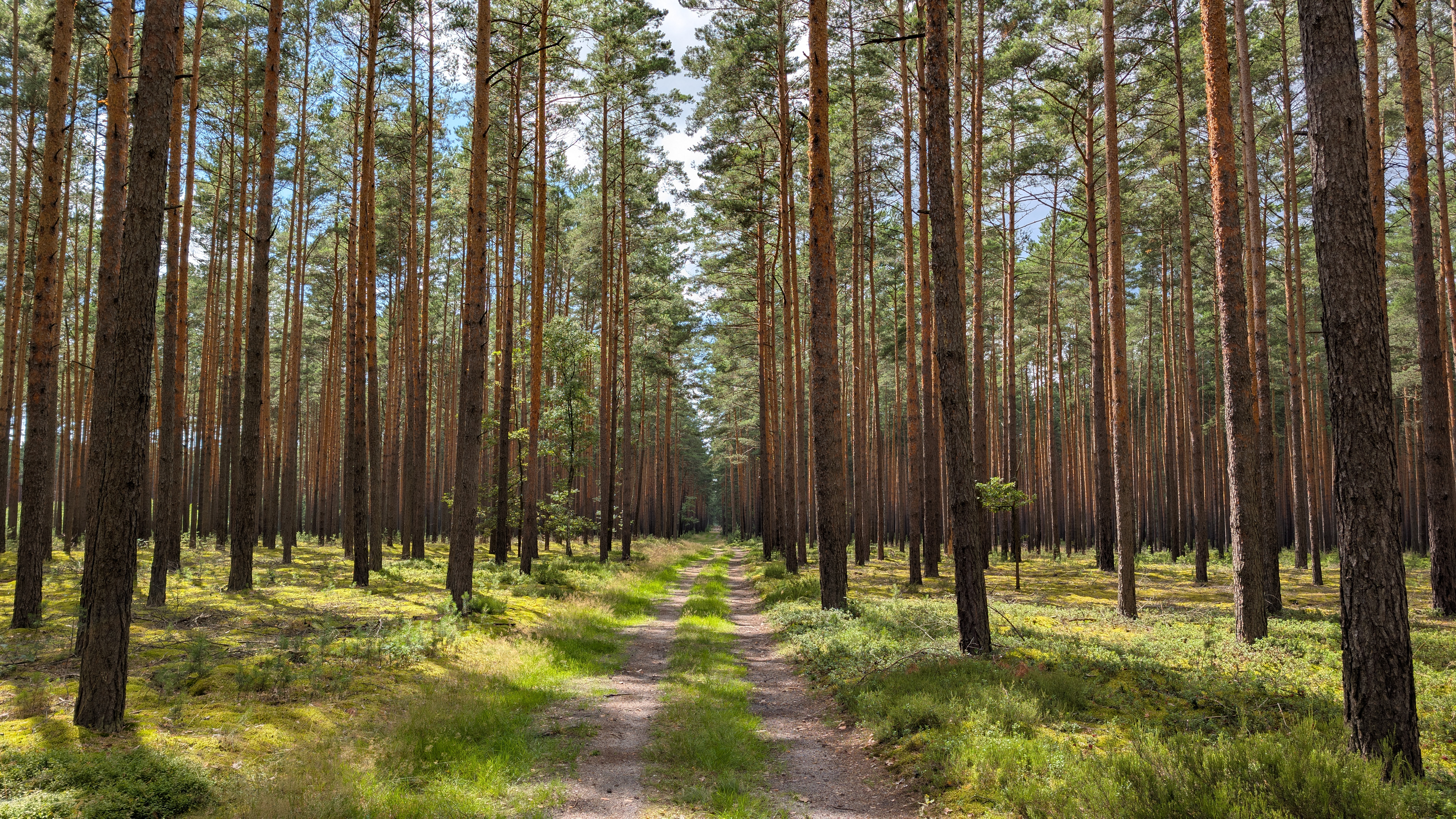
Forest in Polana

For as late as spring 1947, the village was uninhabited, occasionally visited by workers of the nearby forest districts and looters. It was until the first people started to come to the village between 1947–1948. The Zapałów Forest District was established in building no. 3. It covered the areas of Dębówek, Jagodzin, Głuszec, and even reached the eastern bank of the Lusatian Neisse, which included the village of Prędocice, which was still inhabited at the time.

The village began to grow once again. A shop was opened next to the Forest District headquarters, a community centre was opened, along with a new school, located next to the community centre. On 29 April 1959, the village received electricity for the first time, with power lines from Gozdnica.

The school was closed in the 1960s. On 30 September 1968, the Zapałów Forest District was dissolved, were the territory was taken over by the Ruszów Forest District (Nadleśnictwo Ruszów). From 1975 to 1998, the village was in the Jelenia Góra Voivodeship. The community centre and shop was closed in February 1991, and was left abandoned until the buildings were demolished in 2017, together with the school.
