= Dębiny railway station =

Former railway station in south-western Poland

Dębiny
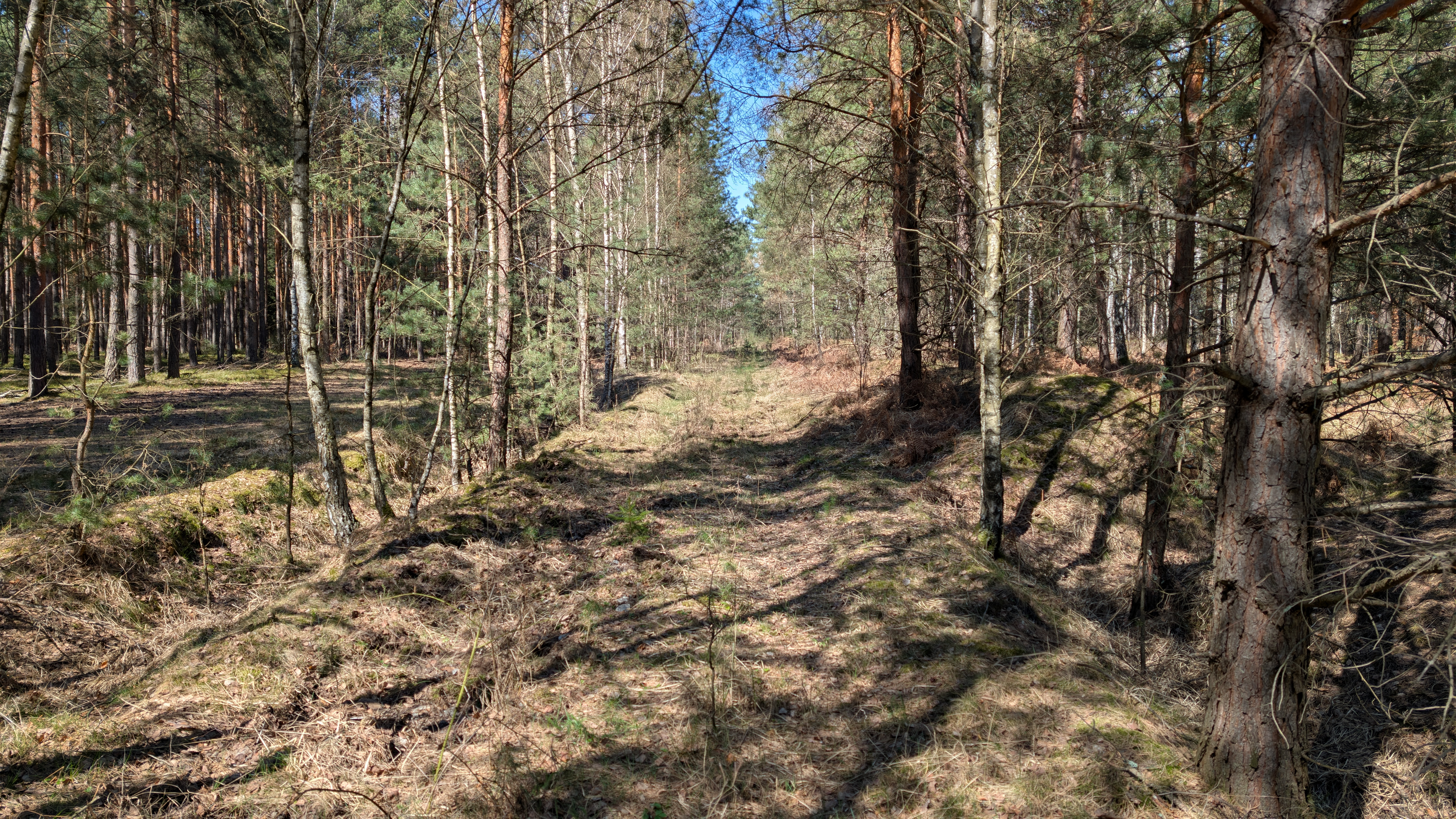
- Site of the former station in 2026

General information
- Location: Near Dębówek, Lower Silesian Voivodeship; Poland
- Coordinates: 51°25′53.7″N 15°07′37.6″E
- Line: Ruszów–Gozdnica railway (dismantled)
- Platforms: 1
- Train operators: Lusatian Railway Company (1896–1939); Deutsche Reichsbahn (1939–1945); Polish State Railways (1947–1962)

History
- Opened: 1 October 1896
- Closed: 3 October 1953
- Former names: Eichwalde (before 1945)
Location
- Location within Poland

Dębiny (German: Eichwalde) was a railway station near the settlement of Dębówek, Zgorzelec County, within the Lower Silesian Voivodeship in south-western Poland.

Prior to its closure, the station served the nearby Dębówek Forestry. The station closed on 3 October 1953. The platform was demolished the following year.

== History ==
The station was opened by the Lusatian Railway Company as Eichwalde on 1 December 1896, part of the Ruszów–Gozdnica railway. It was built to serve the nearby Eichwalde Forestry.

After World War II, the area was placed under Polish administration. In the summer of 1945, the Red Army dismantled the tracks of the whole line to under 'war reparations'. As a result, the station was abandoned, until 1947, when the Ruszów–Gozdnica railway was rebuilt by Polish State Railways.

The station reopened on 4 May 1947 as Dębiny, under Polish State Railways, continuing to serve the nearby, now Dębówek Forestry. Services called at the station until its closure on 3 October 1953. The platform was demolished the following year.

== Former services ==
Preceding station	Disused railways	Following station
Ruszów Szklarnia towards Ruszów	Polish State Railways; Ruszów–Gozdnica	Gozdnica; Terminus
