= Ruszów (disambiguation) =

Ruszów may refer to the following:

- Ruszów, Lower Silesian Voivodeship (south-west Poland)
- Ruszów, Lublin Voivodeship (east Poland)
- Ruszów railway station, Lower Silesian Voivodeship
- Ruszów Szklarnia railway station, Lower Silesian Voivodeship
