= Okrąglica =

Okrąglica may refer to the following places in Poland:

- Okrąglica, Zgorzelec County, Lower Silesian Voivodeship
- Okrąglica railway station, Lower Silesian Voivodeship
- Okrąglica, the highest of the Trzy Korony or Three Crowns in the Pieniny mountain range
- Okrąglica, a peak in the Żywiec Beskids
