= Dębówek =

Neighbourhood of Gozdnica, Poland

- Neighbourhood
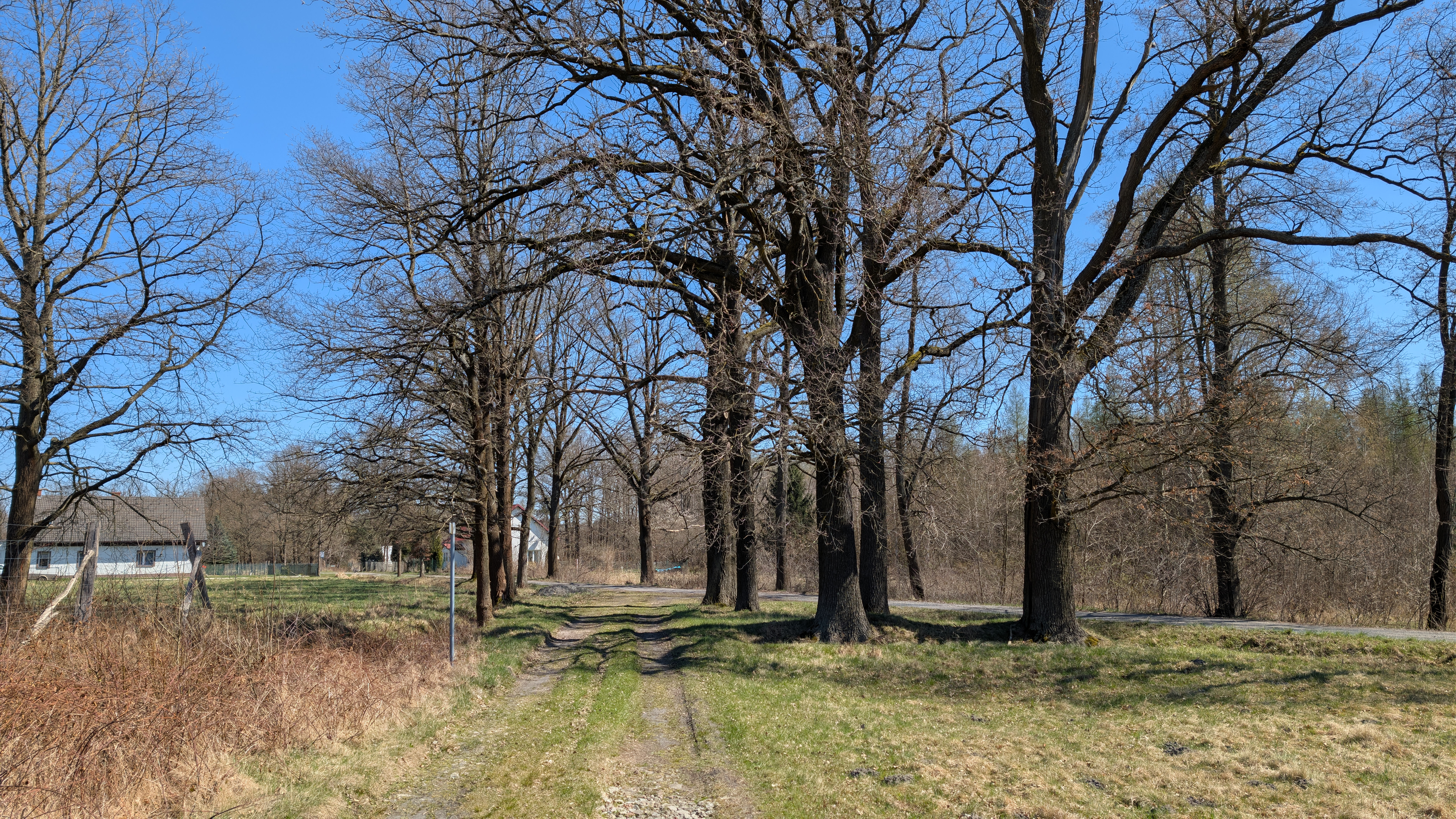

- Location within Poland
- Coordinates: 51°25′40.1″N 15°06′27.5″E
- Country: Poland
- Voivodeship: Lubusz
- County: Żagań
- Town: Gozdnica

Dębówek (German: Eichwalde) is a neighbourhood of the town of Gozdnica in the Lower Silesian Forest, located in Żagań County, Lubusz Voivodeship, in south-western Poland. Before 2016, Dębówek was in Gmina Węgliniec, Zgorzelec County in the Lower Silesian Voivodeship.

== History ==
Dębiny railway station on the Ruszów–Gozdnica railway was located near the neighbourhood, serving the local forestry between 1896 and 1953. Dębówek forestry (part of Ruszów) is based here, the forest complex encompasses the village and Polana.
