= Gozdnica railway station =

Abandoned railway station in Gozdnica, Poland

Gozdnica
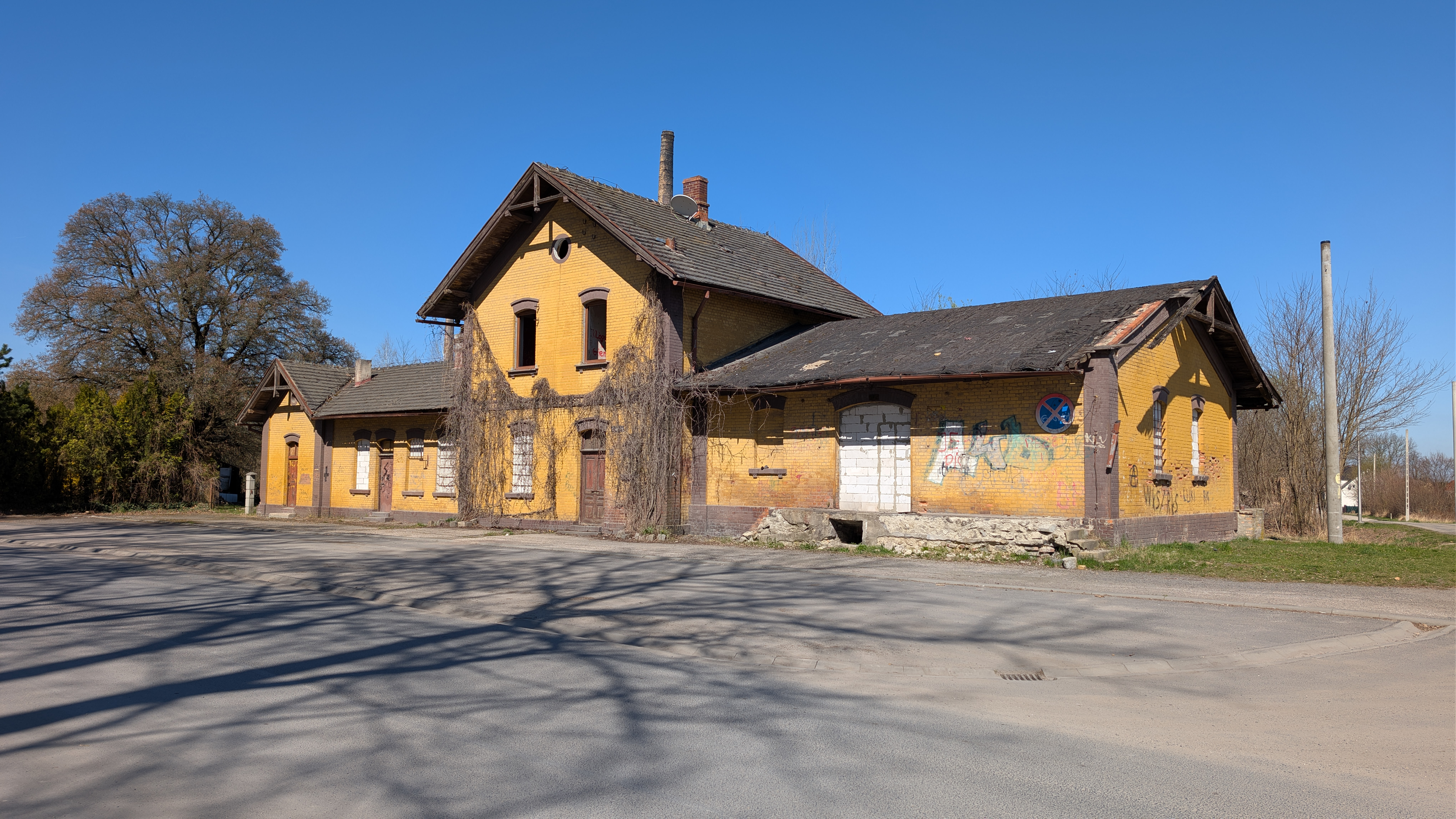
- Abandoned station building in 2026

General information
- Location: Gozdnica, Lubusz Voivodeship; Poland
- Coordinates: 51°26′32.4″N 15°05′43.2″E
- Platforms: 2

History
- Opened: 1 December 1896
- Closed: 2005
- Former names: Freiwaldau 1896–1909; Freiwaldau (Kr. Sagan) 1910–1930; Freiwaldau (Niederschlesien) 1931–1945; Borowsk 1945–1946

Key dates
- 1947: Passenger services resumed
- 1962: Passenger services withdrawn
- 1999: Freight services withdrawn
- 2005: Closed
Location
- Location within Poland

Gozdnica was a railway station in the town of Gozdnica, Żagań County within the Lubusz Voivodeship in south-western Poland. The station has been abandoned since 2006.

== History ==
The station was opened by the Lusatian Railway Company as Freiwaldau on 1 December 1896. The line branched off Ruszów, and was built to transport Gozdnica's ceramics and glass industries by rail.

On 1 January 1939, the Lusatian Railway Company was nationalised. The line became a part of the Deutsche Reichsbahn, as a branch line. It took between 18 and 22 minutes for a passenger train to cover the whole 8.42 km (5.23 mi) route.

After World War II, the area was placed under Polish administration as the Oder–Neisse line became the new border between Germany and Poland. In the summer of 1945, the Red Army dismantled the tracks of the railway line to Gozdnica under 'war reparations'. Since the route was needed to continue the local industry production of ceramics and glass, the line was reconstructed. On 4 May 1947, Polish State Railways resumed railway services with two passenger trains every day, one in the morning, and one in the evening.

On 26 October 1962, passenger train services were withdrawn on the whole line. Freight trains operated until their withdrawal in 1999. The last train arrived into Gozdnica on 28 April 2002, and was a special tourist train service, operated by a Ty3-2 steam locomotive. The line remained operational until 2006, with the tracks being dismantled in 2015.

== Former services ==
Preceding station	Disused railways	Following station
Dębiny towards Ruszów	Polish State Railways; Ruszów–Gozdnica	Terminus
