= Gmina Węgliniec =

Gmina Węgliniec Węgliniec Commune
- Gmina
- Flag Coat of arms
- Interactive map of Gmina Węgliniec
- Coordinates (Węgliniec): 51°17′18″N 15°13′32″E
- Country: Poland
- Voivodeship: Lower Silesian
- County: Zgorzelec
- Seat: Węgliniec

Area
  - Total: 338.44 km^{2} (130.67 sq mi)

Population (2019-06-30)
  - Total: 8,351
  - Density: 24.67/km^{2} (63.91/sq mi)
  - Urban: 2,846
  - Rural: 5,505
- Website: http://www.wegliniec.pl

Gmina Węgliniec is an urban-rural gmina (administrative district) in Zgorzelec County, Lower Silesian Voivodeship, in south-western Poland. Its seat is the town of Węgliniec, which lies approximately 22 kilometres (14 mi) north-east of Zgorzelec, and 128 kilometres (80 mi) west of the regional capital Wrocław.

The gmina covers an area of 338.44 square kilometres (130.7 sq mi), and as of 2019 its total population is 8,351.

== Neighbouring gminas ==
Gmina Węgliniec is bordered by the town of Gozdnica and the gminas of Iłowa, Nowogrodziec, Osiecznica, Pieńsk and Przewóz.

== Villages ==
Apart from the town of Węgliniec, the gmina contains the villages of Czerwona Woda, Jagodzin, Kieszków, Kościelna Wieś, Kuźnica, Łężek, Okrąglica, Piaseczna, Piaski, Polana, Ruszów, Stary Węgliniec and Zielonka.

On 1 January 2016, the borders of the gmina changed. This made the small settlement of Dębówek part of the town of Gozdnica, within Żagań County, in the Lubusz Voivodeship.

== Twin towns – sister cities ==
Gmina Węgliniec is twinned with:

- Hå, Norway
- Hodkovice nad Mohelkou, Czech Republic
- Horka, Germany
- Kalvarija, Lithuania
- Rothenburg, Germany
- Vyshnivets, Ukraine
