= Oldřichov v Hájích =

- Municipality
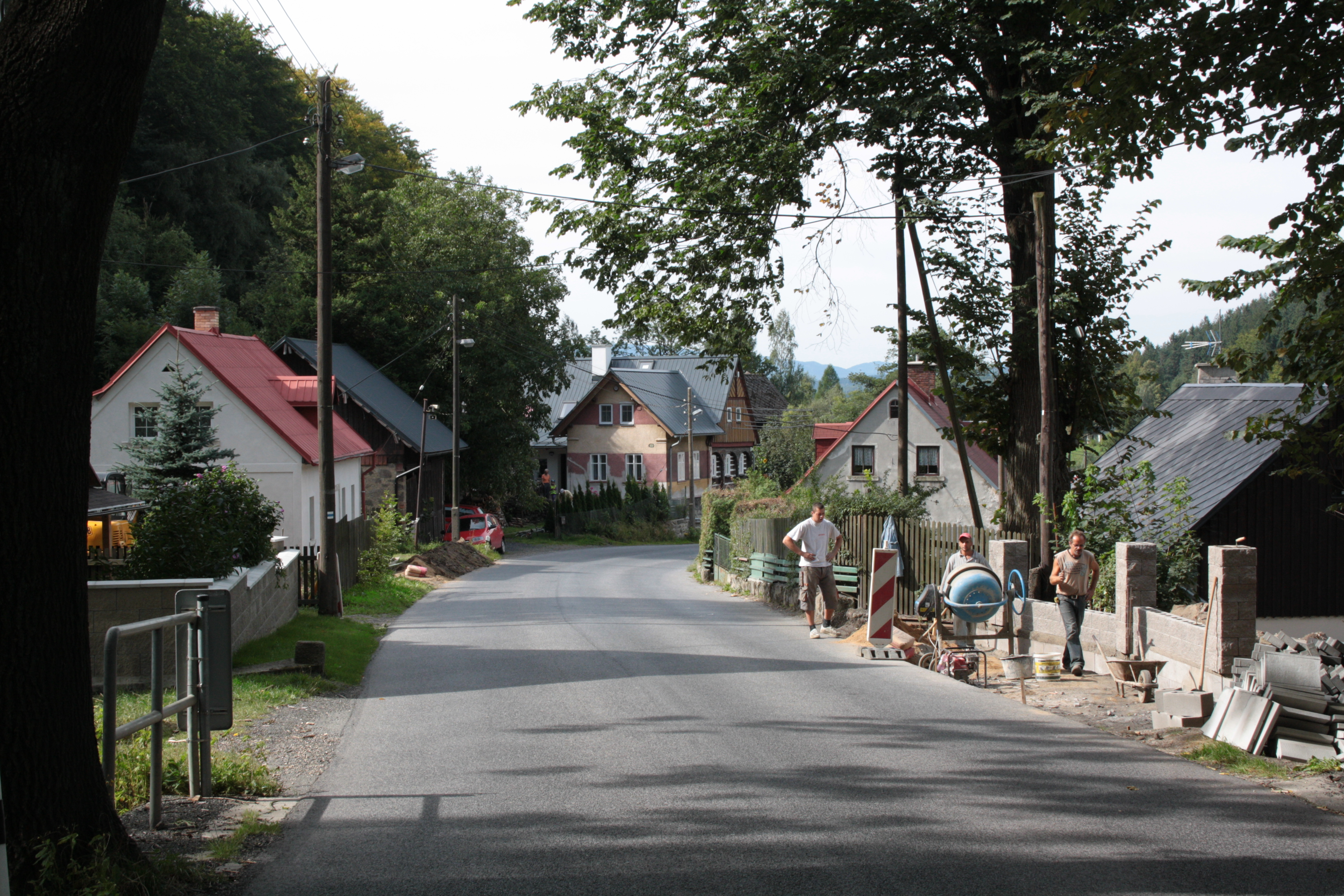
- The village of Filipka

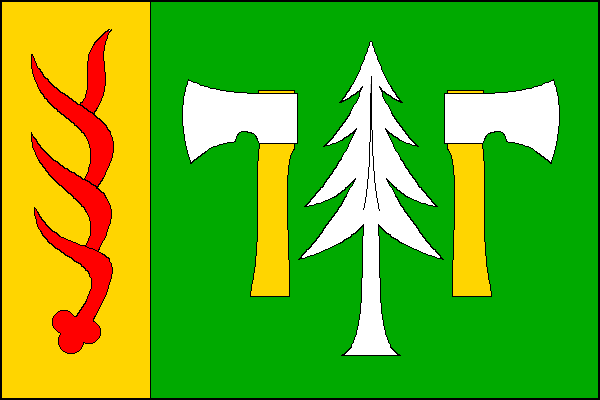
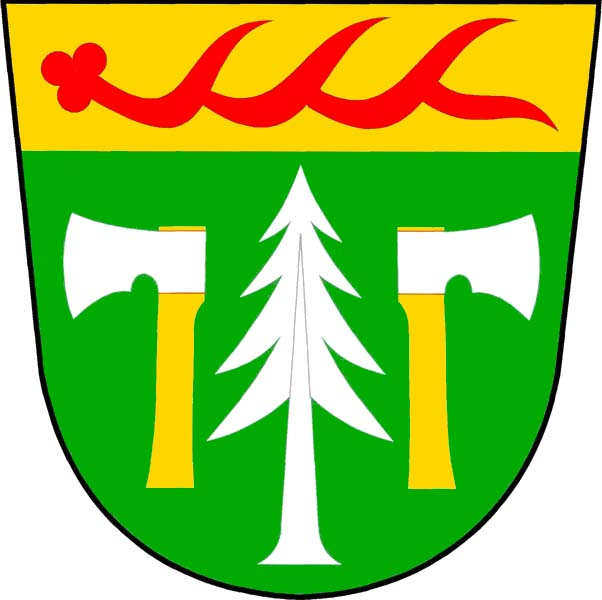
- Flag Coat of arms

- Location in the Czech Republic
- Coordinates: 50°50′59″N 15°5′2″E
- Country: Czech Republic
- Region: Liberec
- District: Liberec
- First mentioned: 1381

Area
  - Total: 16.25 km^{2} (6.27 sq mi)
- Elevation: 400 m (1,300 ft)

Population (2026-01-01)
  - Total: 840
  - Density: 52/km^{2} (130/sq mi)
- Time zone: UTC+1 (CET)
  - Summer (DST): UTC+2 (CEST)
- Postal code: 463 31
- Website: www.oldrichov.cz

Oldřichov v Hájích (German: Buschullersdorf) is a municipality and village in Liberec District in the Liberec Region of the Czech Republic. It has about 800 inhabitants.

== Administrative division ==
Oldřichov v Hájích consists of two municipal parts (in brackets population according to the 2021 census):

- Oldřichov v Hájích (692)
- Filipka (87)

== History ==
The first written mention of Oldřichov v Hájích is from 1381.

== Demographics ==
Historical population
Year	Pop.	±%
1869	1,787	—
1880	1,666	−6.8%
1890	1,583	−5.0%
1900	1,536	−3.0%
1910	1,478	−3.8%
1921	1,321	−10.6%
1930	1,514	+14.6%
1950	751	−50.4%
1961	757	+0.8%
1970	680	−10.2%
1980	506	−25.6%
1991	412	−18.6%
2001	454	+10.2%
2011	665	+46.5%
2021	779	+17.1%
Source: Censuses

== Twin towns – sister cities ==
Oldřichov v Hájích is twinned with:

- Gozdnica, Poland
