= Zielonka, Lower Silesian Voivodeship =

Zielonka
- Village
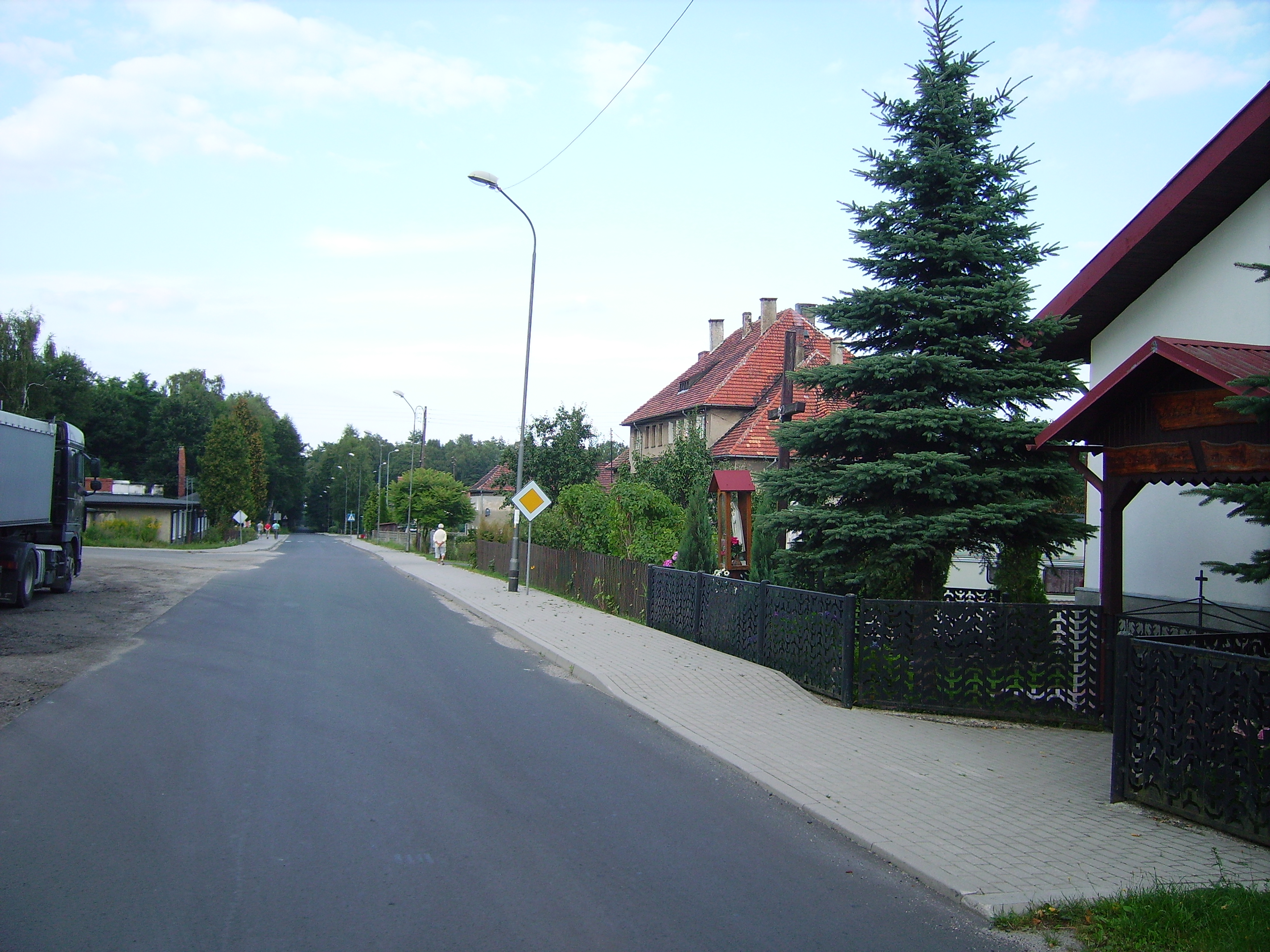

- Location within Poland
- Coordinates: 51°16′20″N 15°8′52″E
- Country: Poland
- Voivodeship: Lower Silesian
- County: Zgorzelec
- Gmina: Węgliniec
- Population (2021): 287
- Postal code: 59-940
- Area code: +48 75
- Vehicle registration: DZG

Zielonka [ʑɛˈlɔŋka] is a village in the Lower Silesian Forest, located in the administrative district of Gmina Węgliniec, within Zgorzelec County, Lower Silesian Voivodeship, in south-western Poland.
