= Piaseczna =

- Village
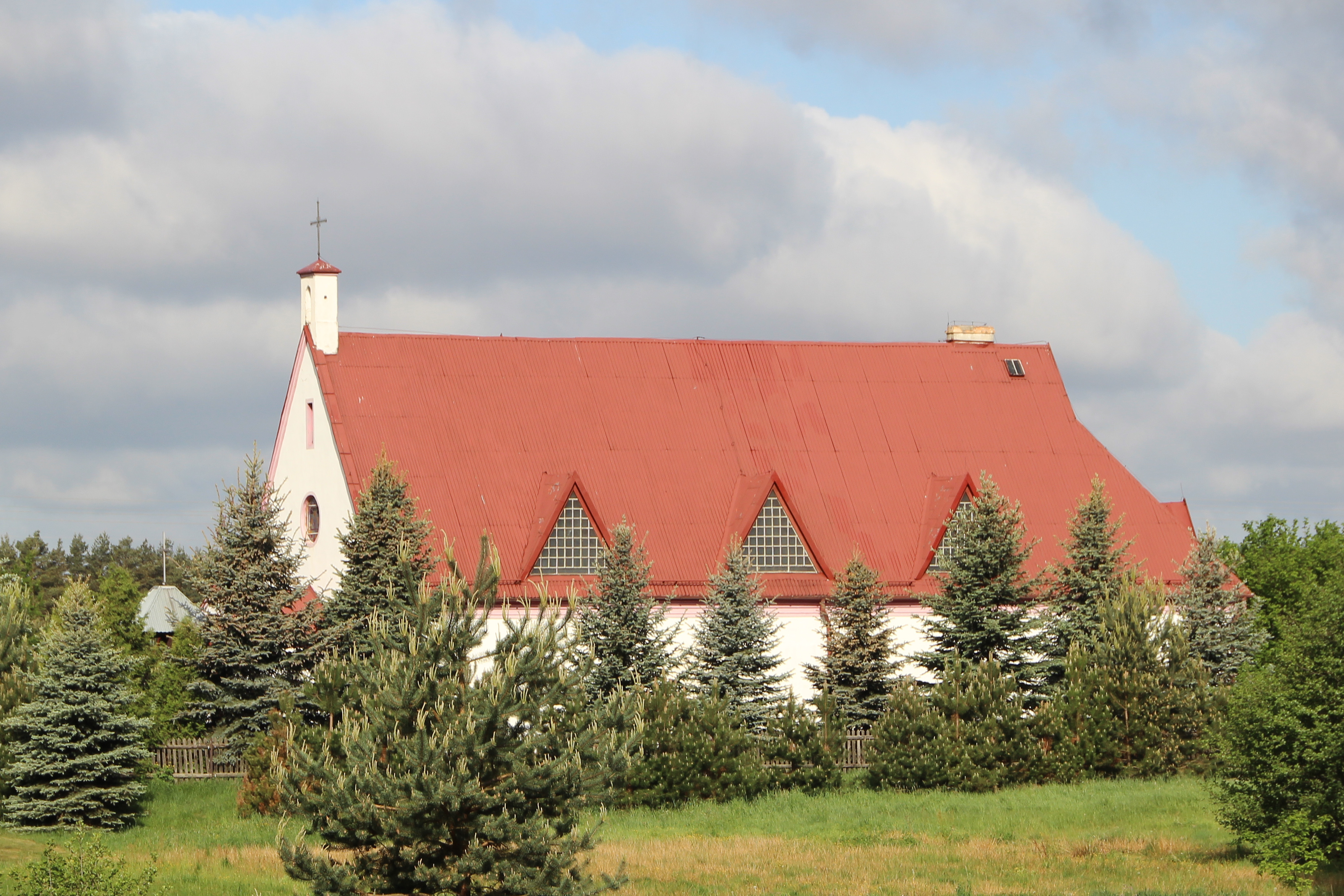
- Church in Piaseczna

- Location within Poland
- Coordinates: 51°20′47″N 15°09′37″E
- Country: Poland
- Voivodeship: Lower Silesian
- County: Zgorzelec
- Gmina: Węgliniec
- Population: 270

Piaseczna [pjaˈsɛt͡ʂna] (German: Schönberg; Upper Sorbian: Pjašecna) is a village in the administrative district of Gmina Węgliniec, within Zgorzelec County, Lower Silesian Voivodeship, in south-western Poland.
