= Ruszów–Gozdnica railway =

Railway line in south-western Poland

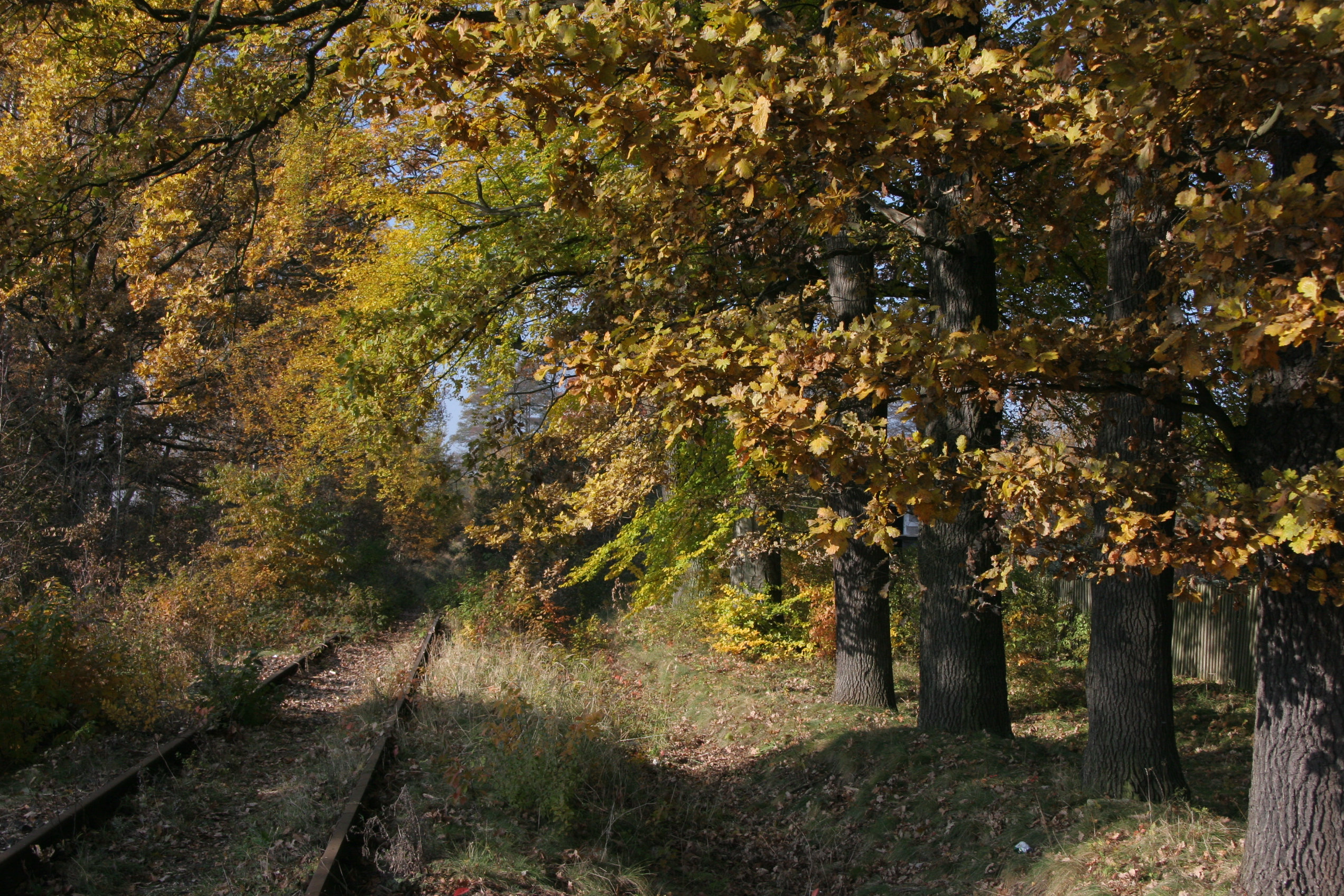
- Abandoned tracks near Ruszów before they were dismantled in 2015

Overview
- Status: Dismantled
- Line number: PKP 339
- Locale: Lower Silesian and Lubusz voivodeships, Poland
- Termini: Ruszów; Gozdnica

History
- Opened: 1 December 1896
- Closed: 2006
- Dismantled: 2015

Technical
- Line length: 8.42 km (5.23 mi)
- Number of tracks: 1
- Track gauge: 1,435 mm (4 ft 8 1/2 in) standard gauge

The Ruszów–Gozdnica railway was a single-track railway line connecting Ruszów railway station in Ruszów and Gozdnica railway station in Gozdnica in the Lower Silesian and Lubusz voivodeships of south-western Poland.

The line closed in 2006, with it being dismantled in 2015.

== History ==
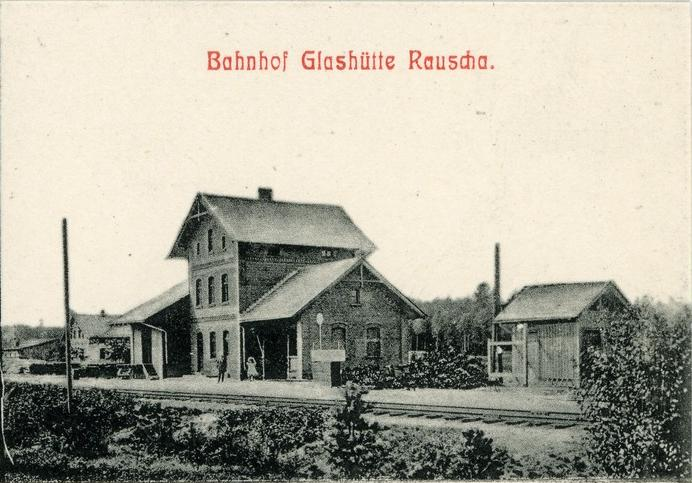
Ruszów Szklarnia lit. 'Ruszów Glassworks' station in 1910

The line was opened by the Lusatian Railway Company on 1 December 1896. It was built for and mainly used to transport Gozdnica's ceramic works. On 1 January 1939, the Lusatian Railway Company was nationalised, becoming part of the Deutsche Reichsbahn. At the time, it took between 18 and 22 minutes for a passenger train to cover the whole 8.42 km (5.23 mi) line.

After World War II, the area came under Polish administration. In the summer of 1945, the Red Army dismantled the tracks of the whole line under 'war reparations'.

Since the line was crucial for transporting Gozdnica's ceramic works, the line was rebuilt, and reopened on 4 May 1947, by Polish State Railways. Two passenger trains ran on the line, one in the morning, and one in the evening.

On 26 October 1962, passenger train services were withdrawn. Freight trains still ran until 1999, with the line remaining operational until it closed in 2006. The last train arrived into Gozdnica on 28 April 2002, a special tourist train service, operated by a Ty3-2 steam locomotive.
