= Lokalbahn AG =

The Lokalbahn AG company (Lokalbahn Aktien-Gesellschaft), or 'LAG' for short, was a private company based in Munich, Bavaria, whose lines of business was the construction and operation of branch lines (the so-called Lokalbahnen or Sekundärbahnen) in Germany and Austria-Hungary. It existed from 1887 to 1938.

== History ==
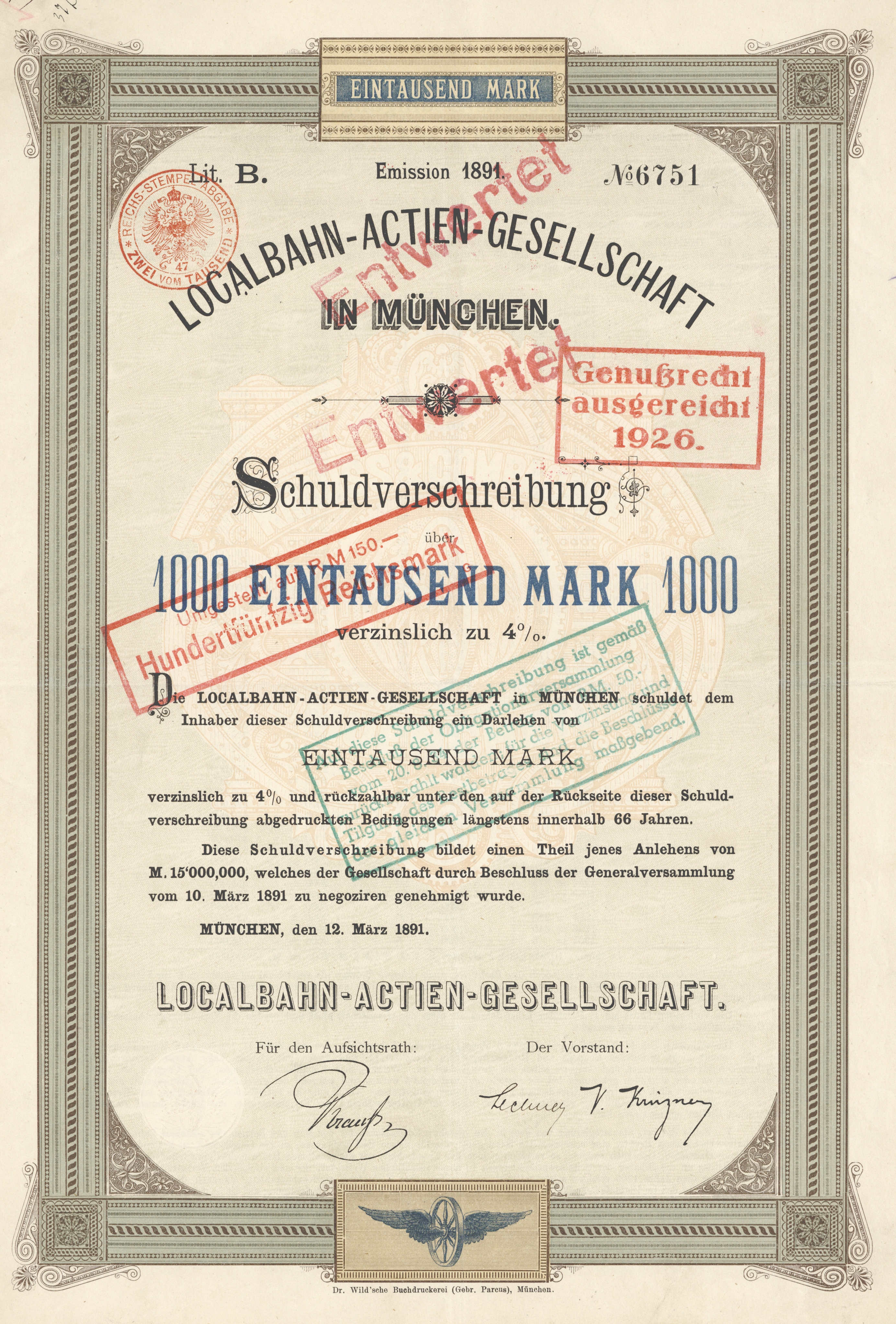
Bond of the Localbahn-AG, issued 12. March 1891

The company was founded on 9 February 1887 by the Lokomotivfabrik Krauss & Co. and the Lechner & Krüzner Branch Line Construction and Operating Company (Lokalbahnbau- und Betriebsunternehmung Lechner & Krüzner). Krauss brought with them the narrow-gauge Feldabahn in Saxony-Weimar, which had been built in 1879/80, into the new company.

The LAG rapidly grew into an important transportation organisation. From 1889 to 1891 alone their routes grew to a length of 430 kilometres. However this did not constitute a single network. The routes were built where tourism, mineral resources, industry, agriculture or forestry could anticipate a significant volume of traffic. The LAG had no preference for a particular system. There were steam and electrical operations, standard gauge and narrow gauge, and both separate routes and the co-use of roads. These activities were complemented, at least for a while, with a rack railway, the Schafbergbahn, steamship operations on the Wolfgangsee and horse and motorised transport.

The LAG proved to be extremely progressive with its introduction of electrical train operations. The Württemberg railway line from Meckenbeuren to Tettnang was the first electrically operated standard-gauge railway in Germany (the planning of which Oskar von Miller, amongst others, took part). The Ammergaubahn from Murnau to Oberammergau, which was sold to the company, became the first single-phase AC line in Germany.

Apart from its own routes in southern Germany the company owned the majority of shares in the Lausitz Railway Company (Lausitzer Eisenbahn-Gesellschaft) and had a share in the Salzkammergut Lokalbahn AG and the Central Bank for Railway Stocks. The latter had, especially over the West Hungarian Lokalbahn-AG, influence on the numerous railway routes in Hungary with a total length of over 700 kilometers, which had been built by the LAG.

During the First World War and the years following, the company had to combat major difficulties. The loss of the Hungarian routes hit their accounts especially hard. After overcoming inflation, things improved again, however the worldwide economic crisis as well as the increasing pressure of competition from road transport services brought the company to the brink of ruin at the beginning of the 1930s.

With the loans from Deutsche Reichsbahn-Gesellschaft, reductions in capital and write-offs by the states of Bavaria and Württemberg, restoration to profitability was achieved again in 1934, however it only postponed the end. With effect from 1 August 1938 the entire assets transferred to the Deutsches Reich under a Reich law.

== Railway lines in Germany ==
=== Standard-gauge lines ===
- Sonthofen – Oberstdorf, 13 km long, steam operated.

Opened: 29 July 1888.
The line shared the same terminus as the Royal Bavarian State Railways (Königlich Bayerische Staats-Eisenbahnen) and is now part of the Iller Valley line. The LAG took over as well from the state railway the operations on their route Sonthofen – Immenstadt on the Buchloe–Lindau railway.

- Marktoberdorf – Füssen (Biessenhofen–Füssen line), 31 km long, steam operated.

Opened: 1 June 1889. On 18 May 1889 the body of the Queen Mother, Marie of Bavaria, was transported by rail here.

- Murnau – Garmisch-Partenkirchen, 26 km long, steam operated.
  Opened: 21 July 1889.

On 1 January 1908 the Bavarian state railway took over the line as part of the subsequent Munich–Garmisch-Partenkirchen railway.

- Rangaubahn (Fürth – Zirndorf – Cadolzburg), 13 km long, steam operated.

Opened: Fürth – Zirndorf on 30 November 1890, to Cadolzburg on 14 October 1892.

- Lusatian Railway Company, 80.9 km long, steam operated.

(The line lies in Lower Silesia north of Görlitz and east of the Neiße, in present-day Poland)
Opened: Hansdorf – Priebus, 22.9 km on 1 October 1895.
Rauscha – Freiwaldau, 8.4 km on 1 December 1896.
Teuplitz – Sommerfeld, 19.6 km on 1 October 1897.
Teuplitz – Sommerfeld, 19,6 km on 1 October 1897.
Muskau – Teuplitz, 23,1 km on 15 June 1898.
Priebus – Lichtenberg, 6,9 km on 1 October 1913.

- Isartalbahn (Munich – Schäftlarn – Bichl), 50.5 km long, steam operated.

Opened: Munich-Isartal Station – Thalkirchen, 2.,1 km on 10 April 1892 (G), on 1 June 1892 (P)
M.-Thalkirchen – Schäftlarn, 16 km long on 10 June 1891
Schäftlarn – Wolfratshausen, 7.9 km long on 27 July 1891
Wolfratshausen – Beuerberg, 10.9 km long on 15 August 1897
Beuerberg – Bichl, 13.5 km long on 23 May 1898
From 1900 electrically operated (600 V =) between Munich and Höllriegelskreuth-Grünwald.
Since 1959 sections of the route have been closed. Today, the rest belongs to the Munich S-Bahn network.

- Türkheim – Bad Wörishofen, 5.3 km long, electrically operated 550 V =.

Opened: 15 August 1896.
Built by LAG, Bad Wörishofen. On 12 November 1905 including 2 railbuses and power station bought and operated by the LAG.

- Lokalbahn Bad Aibling–Feilnbach, 12 km long, electrically operated 550 V =.

Opened: 28 May 1897.
The branch line Bad Aibling-Feilnbach was built by the Actiengesellschaft Elektricitätswerke of Dresden, that had founded the South Germany Electrical Branch Line Company (Süddeutsche Elektrische Lokalbahnen Aktiengesellschaft) or SEL in 1899 as the operating company. After the bankruptcy of the SEL in 1901 the Bavarian state railways took over the operations from time to time. A takeover of the vehicles, power station and operations by the LAG on 1 January 1904 followed. In 1959 it was converted to 15 kV AC and closed in 1973.

- Murnau – Oberammergau (Ammergau Railway), 24 km long, electrically operated.

Opened: 1 May 1900, from November 1898 trial runs.
The planned three-phase electrical operations could not be achieved. Built by O.L. Kummer & Cie., Dresden. After its bankruptcy the Bavarian state railways temporarily took over the operation until the LAG became the owner on 19 November 1903 and continued operations, initially with steam locomotives.
On 1 January 1905 electrical operation with 5,5 kV 16 Hz AC.

- Lokalbahn Meckenbeuren–Tettnang, 4.3 km long, electrically operated 650 V =.

Opened: 4 December 1895 with 2 railbuses. Own power station until 1926. From 1 February 1962 railbus operations.
Closed: 30 May 1976.

=== Narrow-gauge lines ===
- Feldabahn (Saxony-Weimar), Gauge 1,000 mm (3 ft 3 3/8 in), 44 km long, steam operated

Opened: Salzungen – Dorndorf – Lengsfeld, 19.7 km long, 1 June 1879 (goods traffic), 22 June 1879 (passenger traffic).
Dorndorf – Vacha, 5 km long, 10 August 1879.
Lengsfeld – Dermbach, 8.8 km long, 6 October 1879.
Dermbach – Kaltennordheim, 10.6 km long, 24 June 1880 (goods traffic), 1 July 1880 (passenger traffic).
The line was taken over on 20 May 1902 by the Prussian state railways and taken into operation via Dorndorf to Vacha on 7 July 1906 as standard gauge.

- Straßenbahn Ravensburg–Weingarten–Baienfurt

Narrow-gauge (1,000 mm (3 ft 3 3/8 in)) section opened: Ravensburg–Weingarten, 4.1 km long, 6 January 1888 (P), 15 July 1888 (G).
Extension to Baienfurt on 13 September 1911 of 2.5 km.
Start of steam operations, from 1 September 1910 electrical operations 700 V =.
Closure of the narrow-gauge operation on two sections on 22 February 1959 (Ravensburg–Weingarten) and on 30 June 1959 (Weingarten–Baienfurt).
Opening of the standard gauge for goods traffic: Niederbiegen-Baienfurt–Weingarten on 1 October 1911, of which 1.0 km was three-rail track shared with the tram services. Steam operated.

- Walhalla Line, Gauge 1,000 mm (3 ft 3 3/8 in), 23.4 km long, steam operated.

Opened: Stadtamhof/Regensburg – Donaustauf, 8.7 km long, 23 June 1889 (P), 1 May 1892 (G).
Donaustauf – Wörth/Donau, 14.7 km long, 1 May 1903.
From 1911/12 rollbock traffic. From 1955 worked by diesel locomotives.
Withdrawal of passenger services on 1 October 1960. Full closure 31 December 1968.

- Forst Town Railway, Gauge 1,000 mm (3 ft 3 3/8 in), 14 km long, steam operated.

Opened: 8 May 1893 with factory connections in the area of the town Forst (Lausitz).

== Locomotives and wagons ==
The LAG acquired a total of 84 tank locomotives from Lokomotivfabrik Krauss & Co., of which 53 machines went into the Deutsche Reichsbahn in 1938. The standard-gauge engines were mainly allocated to DRG Class 98. In addition five electric locos and fourteen standard-gauge railbuses as well as six narrow-gauge railbuses went to the DR.

Furthermore, 133 standard-gauge and 34 narrow-gauge passenger coaches went to the DR, as well as 228 standard-gauge luggage vans and goods wagons and 40 narrow-gauge ones. In addition the Reichsbahn received 74 rollbocks.

The tank engine Füssen from 1889 has been preserved in running condition.

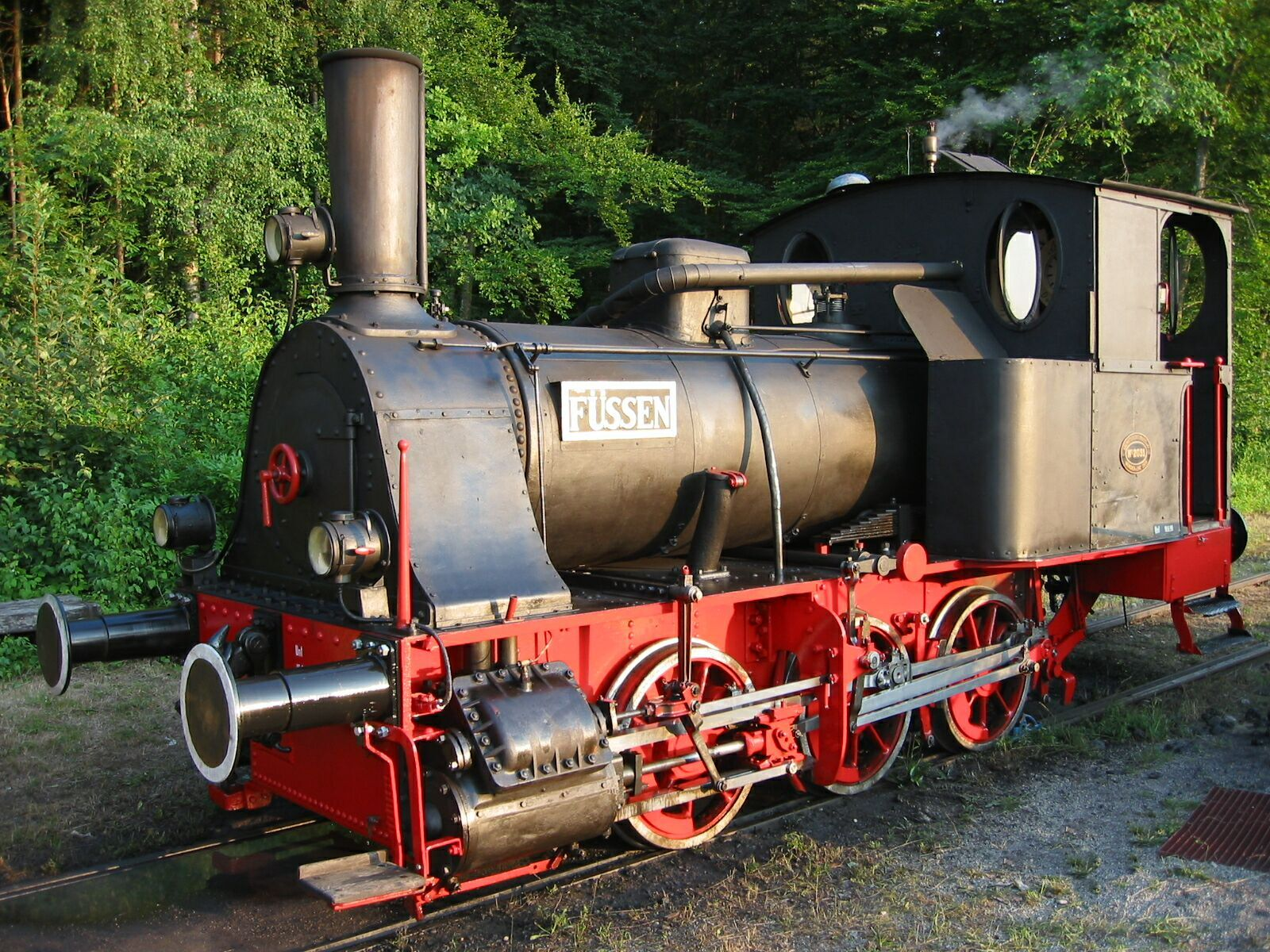
Füssen tank engine in 2003

== Literature ==
- Hermann Bürnheim: Localbahn A.-G. München, Gifhorn 1974, ISBN 3-921237-21-1
- Josef Dollhofer: Das Walhalla=Bockerl. Geschichte der Walhallabahn mit besonderer Abhandlung über die Lokalbahn-Aktiengesellschaft in München. MZ-Buchverlag Regensburg, 1972.
- Stephan Kuchinke: Die Localbahn Aktiengesellschaft – Eine bayerische Privatbahn und ihre Geschichte, transpress Verlag, Stuttgart 2000, ISBN 3-613-71125-7
- Gerd Wolff: Deutsche Klein- und Privatbahnen – Band 7: Bayern, EK-Verlag, Freiburg 2002, ISBN 3-88255-666-8 (Seite 243–359)
- Dt. Reichsbahn, Die deutschen Eisenbahnen in ihrer Entwicklung 1835–1935, Berlin, 1935.

== See also ==
- History of rail transport in Germany
- Royal Bavarian State Railways
- List of Bavarian locomotives and railbuses
