= Okrąglica railway station =

Railway station in south-western Poland

Okrąglica
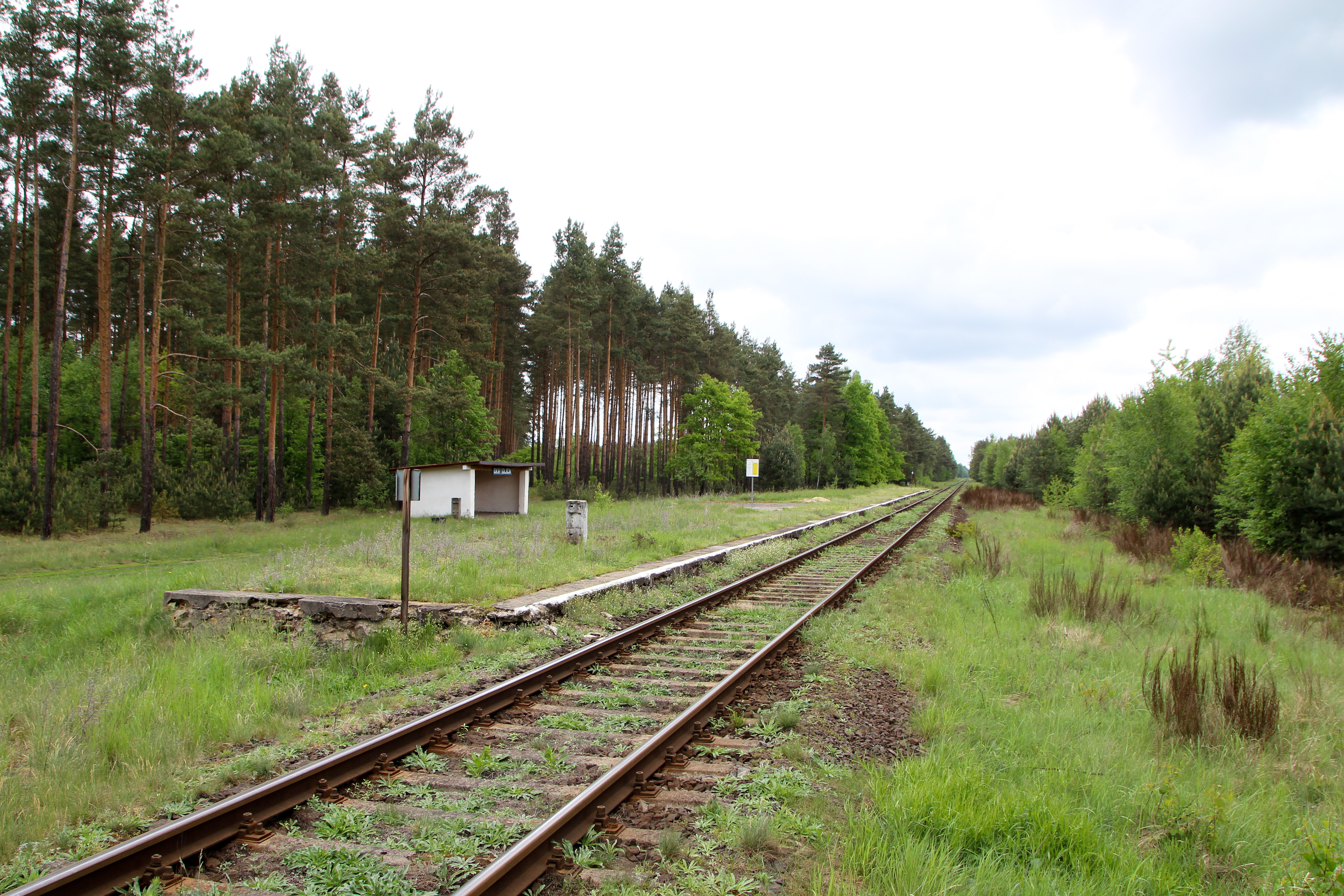
- Platform

General information
- Location: Okrąglica, Lower Silesian Voivodeship; Poland
- Coordinates: 51°26′12.1″N 15°10′53.1″E
- Owner: Polskie Koleje Państwowe S.A.
- Line: Miłkowice–Jasień railway
- Platforms: 1

History
- Opened: 1954
- Former names: Rychlinek (1954–1955)

Services
Preceding station	Polregio	Following station
Ruszów towards Görlitz	PR	Iłowa Żagańska towards Zielona Góra Główna
Location
- Location within Poland Location within Lower Silesian Voivodeship

Okrąglica is a railway station on the Miłkowice–Jasień railway in the village of Okrąglica, Zgorzelec County, within the Lower Silesian Voivodeship in south-western Poland.

== History ==
The station opened in 1954 as Rychlinek. It was built on the site of the former second track of the line, which was dismantled in 1945. Rychlinek was later renamed to its modern name, Okrąglica, in 1955. It was built to serve the workers in the nearby Rychlinek brickyard.

== Accidents and incidents ==
- On 26 May 2007, a Polregio service, operated by PKP class SA105-102 caught fire at the front in the suspension and brake components on both sides. The crew managed to extinguish the fire before the fire departments arrived from Ruszów and Zgorzelec. Passengers of the train were left stranded at the station for two hours until rail replacement buses arrived to continue their journeys. No injuries were reported.

== Train services ==
The station is served by the following services:

- Regional services (R) Görlitz - Żary - Zielona Góra
