= Jagodzin =

- Village
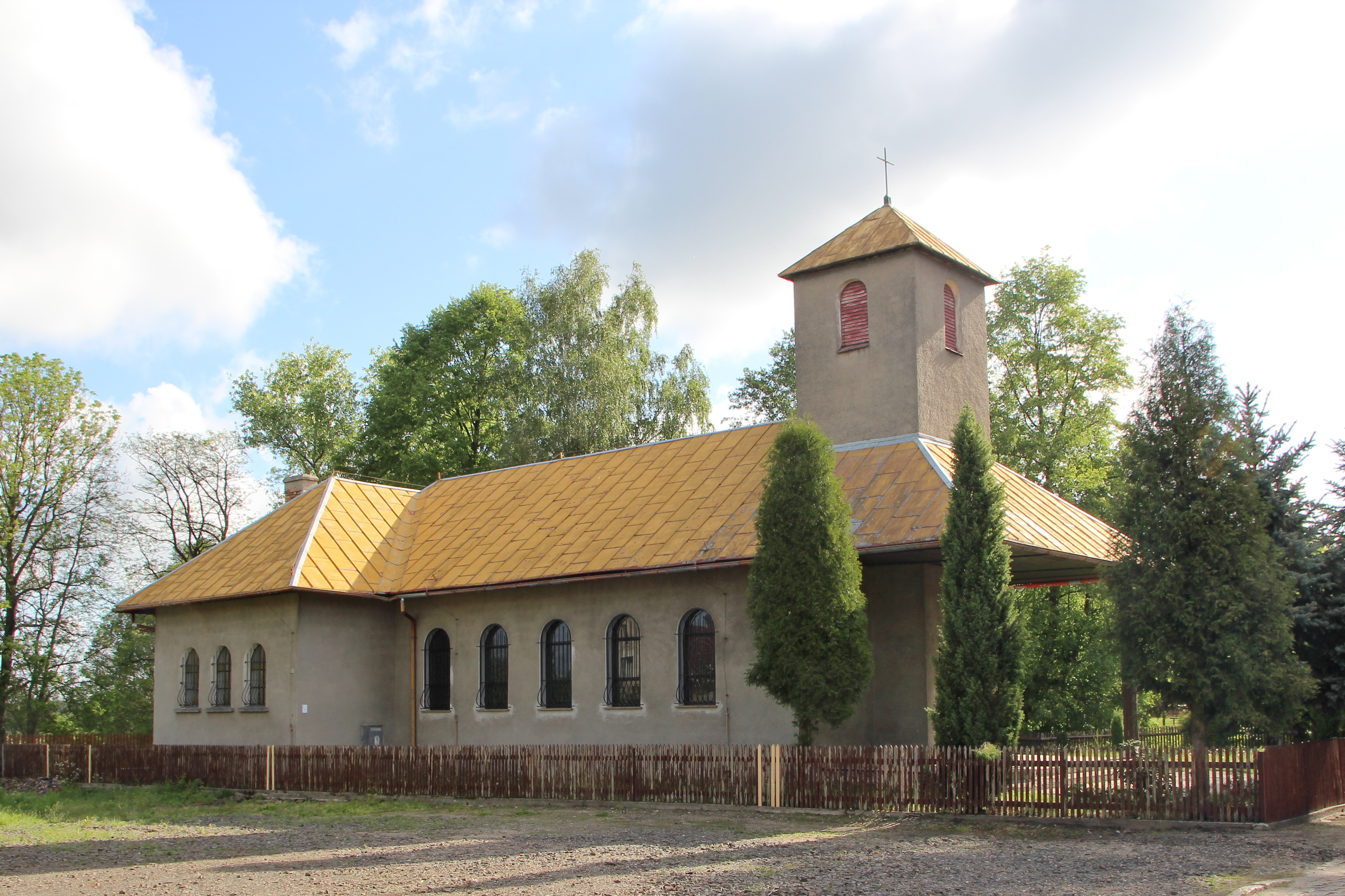
- Church in Jagodzin

- Location within Poland
- Coordinates: 51°21′40″N 15°09′55″E
- Country: Poland
- Voivodeship: Lower Silesian
- County: Zgorzelec
- Gmina: Węgliniec
- Population (2011): 401
- Time zone: UTC+1 (CET)
  - Summer (DST): UTC+2 (CEST)
- Postal code: 59-941
- Area code: +48 75
- Vehicle registration: DZG

Jagodzin [jaˈɡɔd͡ʑin] (German: Neuhammer, Upper Sorbian: Beeren) is a village in the Lower Silesian Forest, located in the administrative district of Gmina Węgliniec, within Zgorzelec County, Lower Silesian Voivodeship, in south-western Poland.

== History ==
The village was founded in the 15th century, originally as a mining settlement, owned by the Penzig family. In April 1945, Jagodzin served as a base of the Second Polish Army under the command of General Karol Świerczewski.
