= Ruszów railway station =

Railway station in Ruszów, south-western Poland

Ruszów
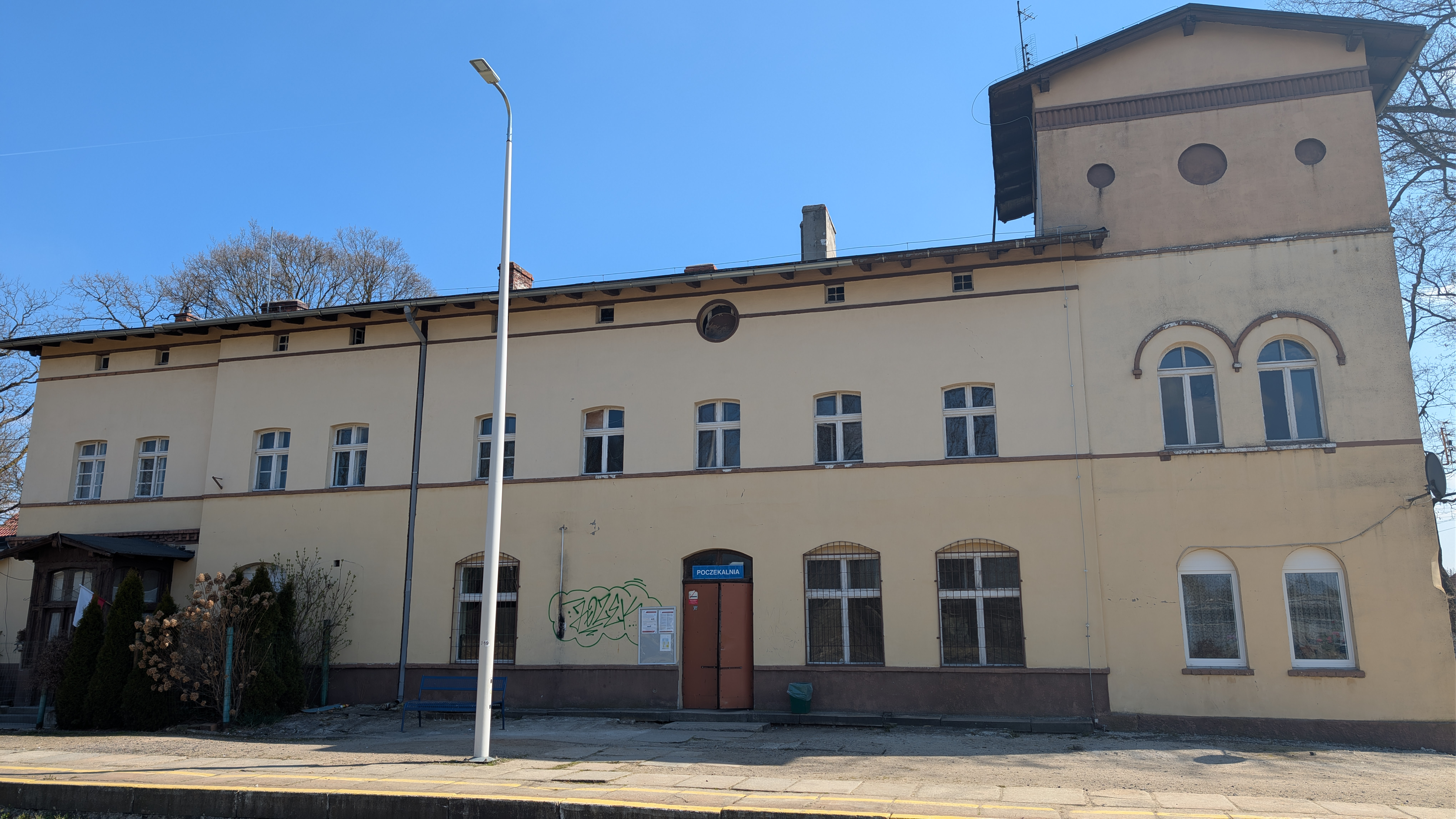
- Station building in 2026

General information
- Location: Ruszów, Lower Silesian Voivodeship; Poland
- Coordinates: 51°24′03.6″N 15°10′35.7″E
- Owner: Polish State Railways
- Lines: Miłkowice–Jasień railway; Ruszów–Gozdnica railway (dismantled)
- Platforms: 3

History
- Opened: 1 September 1846
- Former names: Rauscha (before 1945)

Services
Preceding station	Polregio	Following station
Jagodzin towards Görlitz	PR	Okrąglica towards Zielona Góra Główna
Location
- Location within Poland

Ruszów (German: Rauscha) is a railway station in the village of Ruszów, Zgorzelec County, within the Lower Silesian Voivodeship, in south-western Poland.

The station is situated on the Miłkowice–Jasień railway (between Węgliniec and Żary) and was once the terminus of the now dismantled Ruszów–Gozdnica railway.

== History ==
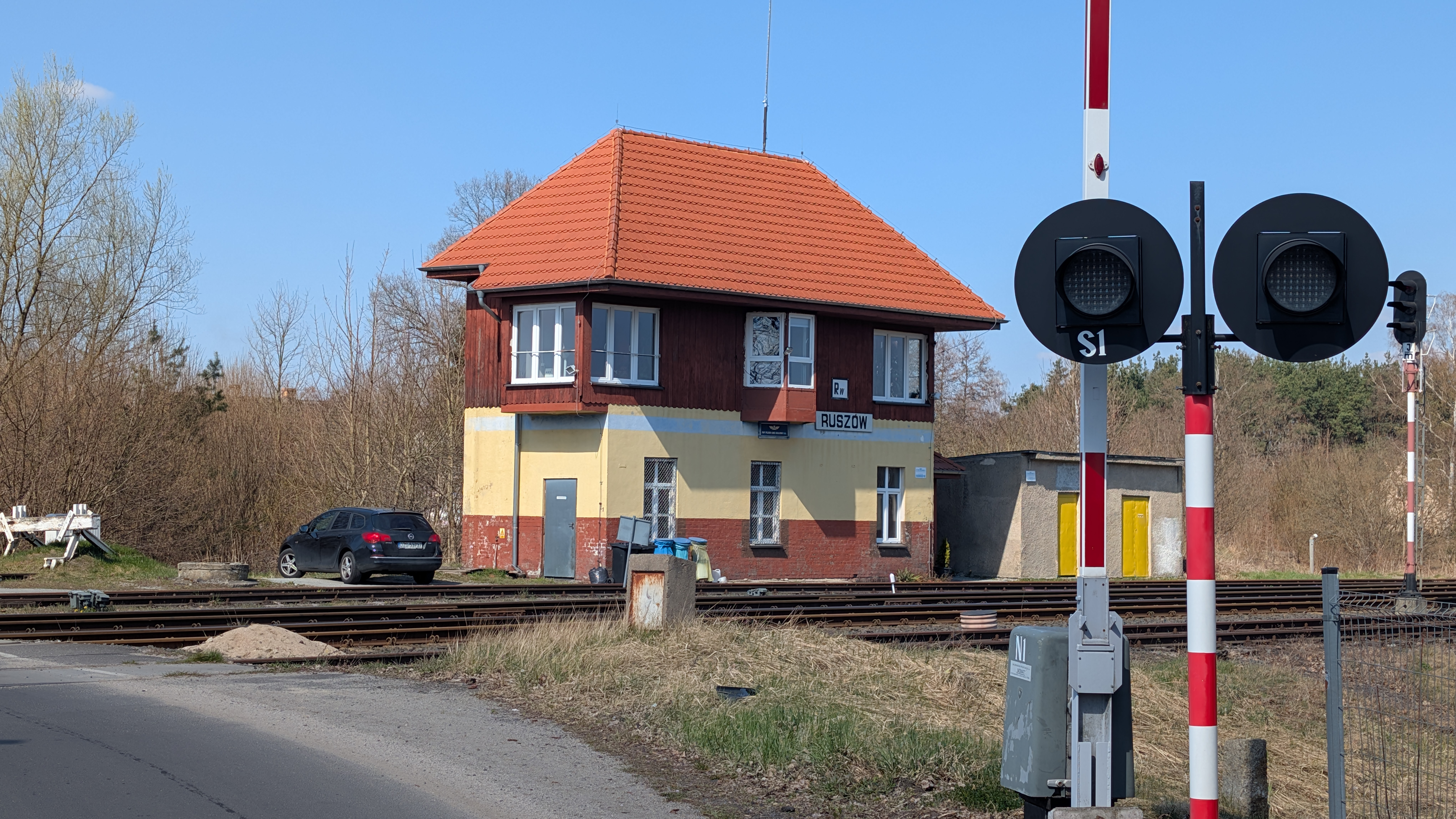
Ruszów signalbox is situated adjacent to a level crossing north of the station

The station opened on 1 September 1846, part of a railway branch off Węgliniec. On 1 December 1896, the Lusatian Railway Company opened the Ruszów–Gozdnica railway, making Ruszów a railway junction.

The new line played a major role in transporting ceramics from Gozdnica with freight trains. Ruszów Szklarnia lit. 'Ruszów Glassworks' station also opened on the line, 1.73 km (1.07 mi) away from the station. It served as the stops of the local glassworks.

After World War II, the Red Army dismantled the tracks of the Ruszów–Gozdnica railway under 'war reparations'. Since the line was needed for local industry production of ceramics and glass, the line was reconstructed. On 4 May 1947, Polish State Railways resumed railway services. The Ruszów–Gozdnica railway was closed in 2005, and dismantled in 2015.

== Train services ==
The station is served by the following service(s):

- Regional services (R) Görlitz - Żary - Zielona Góra

=== Former ===
Preceding station	Disused railways	Following station
Terminus	Polish State Railways; Ruszów–Gozdnica	Ruszów Szklarnia towards Gozdnica
