= Kościelna Wieś, Lower Silesian Voivodeship =

Kościelna Wieś
- Village
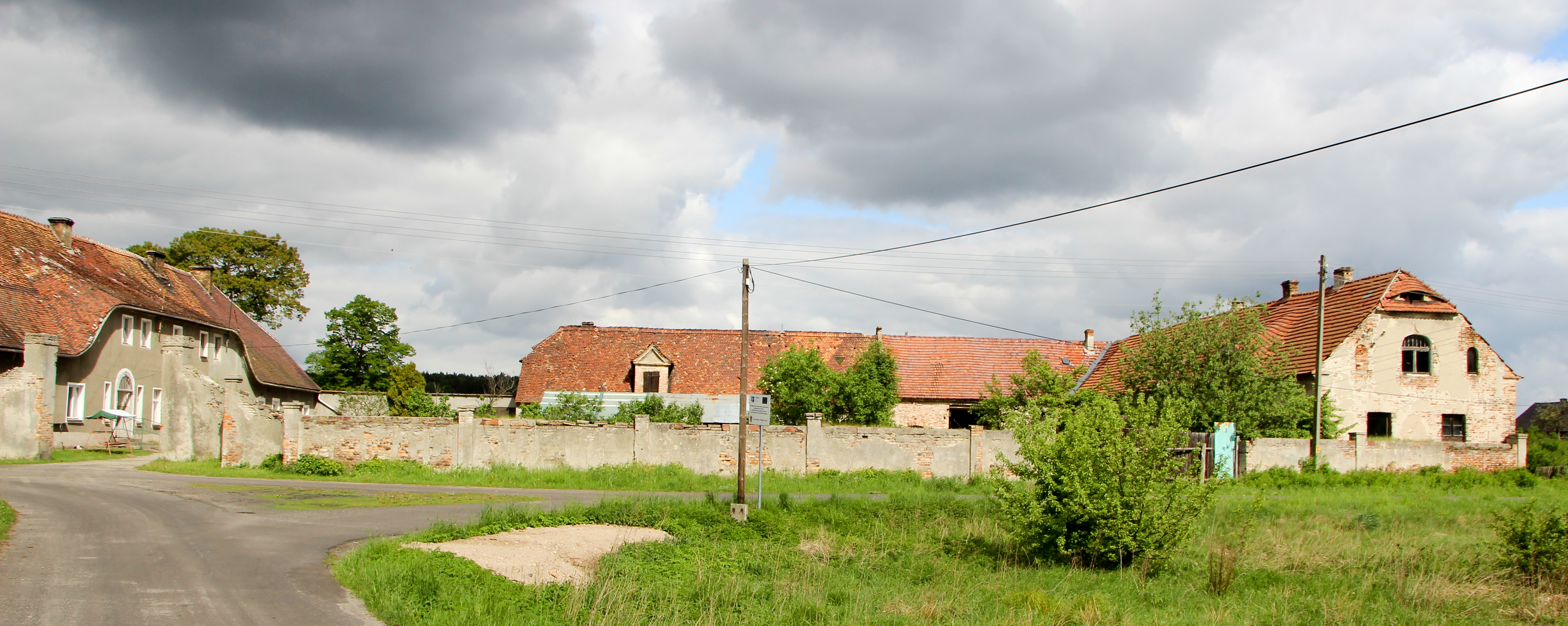
- Kościelna Wieś in 2012

- Location within Poland
- Coordinates: 51°24′57″N 15°11′15″E
- Country: Poland
- Voivodeship: Lower Silesian
- County: Zgorzelec
- Gmina: Węgliniec

Kościelna Wieś [kɔɕˈt͡ɕɛlna ˈvjɛɕ] (Upper Sorbian: Kóšćelna Wjes) is a village in the administrative district of Gmina Węgliniec, within Zgorzelec County, Lower Silesian Voivodeship, in south-western Poland.
