= Okrąglica, Zgorzelec County =

Okrąglica
- Village
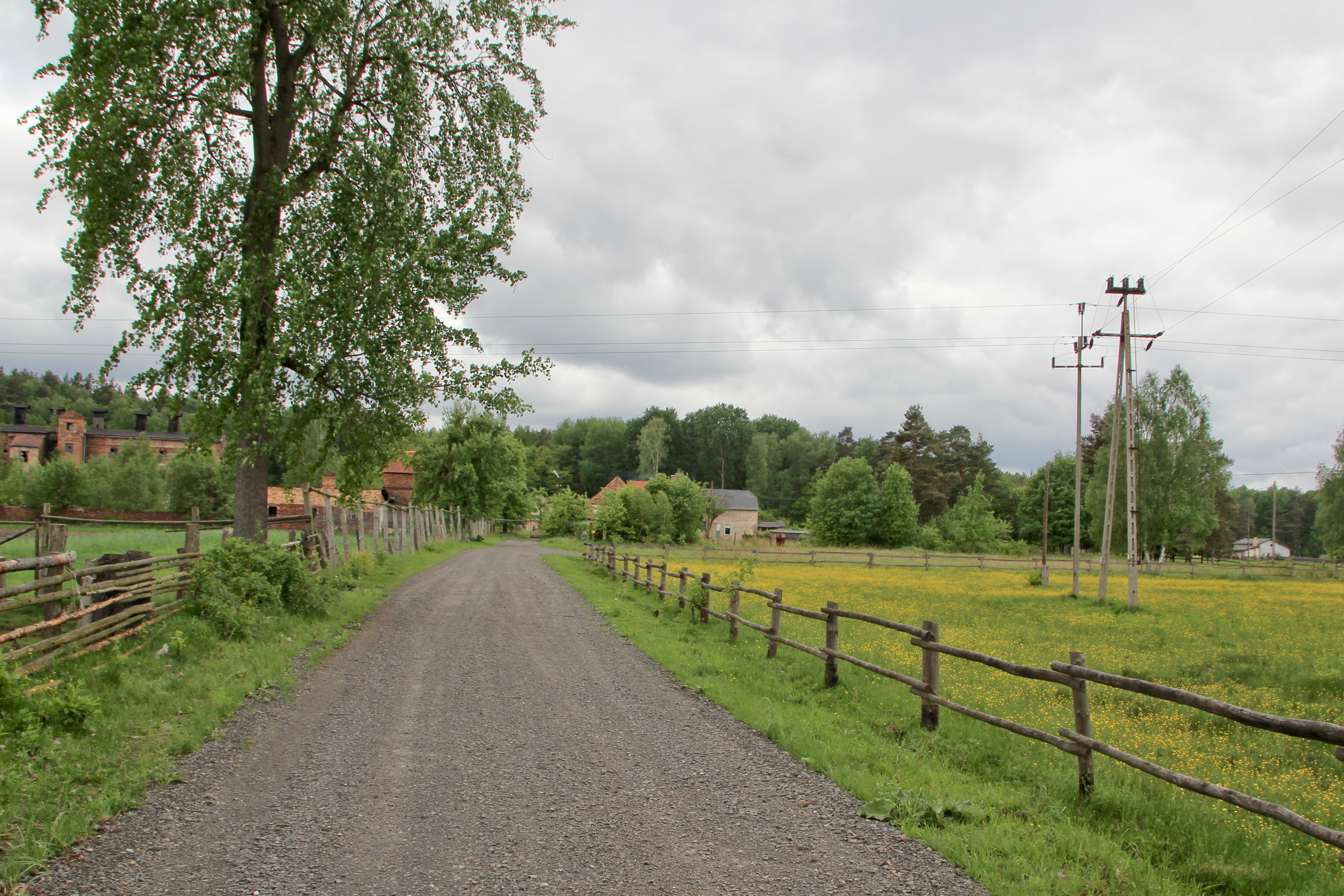
- Okrąglica in 2012

- Location within Poland
- Coordinates: 51°26′14″N 15°10′21″E
- Country: Poland
- Voivodeship: Lower Silesian
- County: Zgorzelec
- Gmina: Węgliniec
- Population: 24
- Time zone: UTC+1 (CET)
  - Summer (DST): UTC+2 (CEST)
- Postal code: 59-940
- Area code: +48 75
- Vehicle registration: DZG

Okrąglica, [ɔkrɔŋˈɡlit͡sa] sometimes Rychlinek (German: Schnellförthel), is a village in the Lower Silesian Forest, located in the administrative district of Gmina Węgliniec, within Zgorzelec County, Lower Silesian Voivodeship, in south-western Poland.

From 1975 to 1998, Okrąglica was in the Jelenia Góra Voivodeship.

== Demographics ==
In 2021, the village had a population of 24, making Okrąglica the least populated village in Gmina Węgliniec.

== Transport ==
The village is served by Okrąglica railway station on the Miłkowice–Jasień railway.
