= Gozdnica =

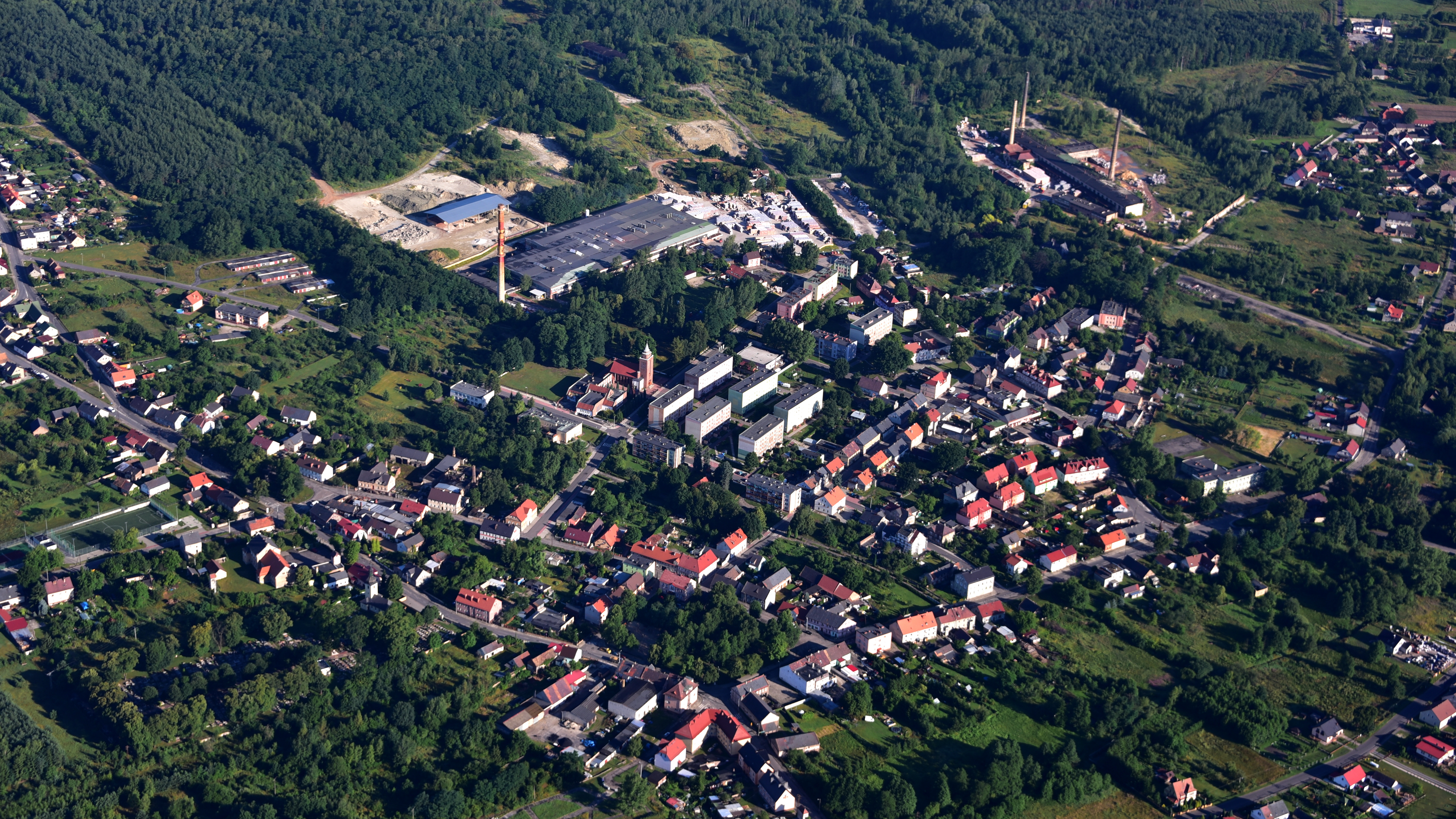
- Aerial view

- Coat of arms

- Location within Poland
- Coordinates: 51°26′16″N 15°05′48″E
- Country: Poland
- Voivodeship: Lubusz
- County: Żagań
- Gmina: Gozdnica (urban gmina)

Area
  - Total: 23.97 km^{2} (9.25 sq mi)

Population (2019-06-30)
  - Total: 3,036
  - Density: 126.7/km^{2} (328.0/sq mi)
- Time zone: UTC+1 (CET)
  - Summer (DST): UTC+2 (CEST)
- Postal code: 68-130
- Vehicle registration: FZG
- Website: http://www.gozdnica.pl

Gozdnica [ɡɔzdˈɲit͡sa] (German: Freiwaldau; Lower Silesian: Freiwaale; Lower Sorbian: Wólniki Bórow) is a town in Żagań County, Lubusz Voivodeship, in south-western Poland, with 3,036 inhabitants (2019). Situated close to Lower Silesian Voivodeship.

== History ==
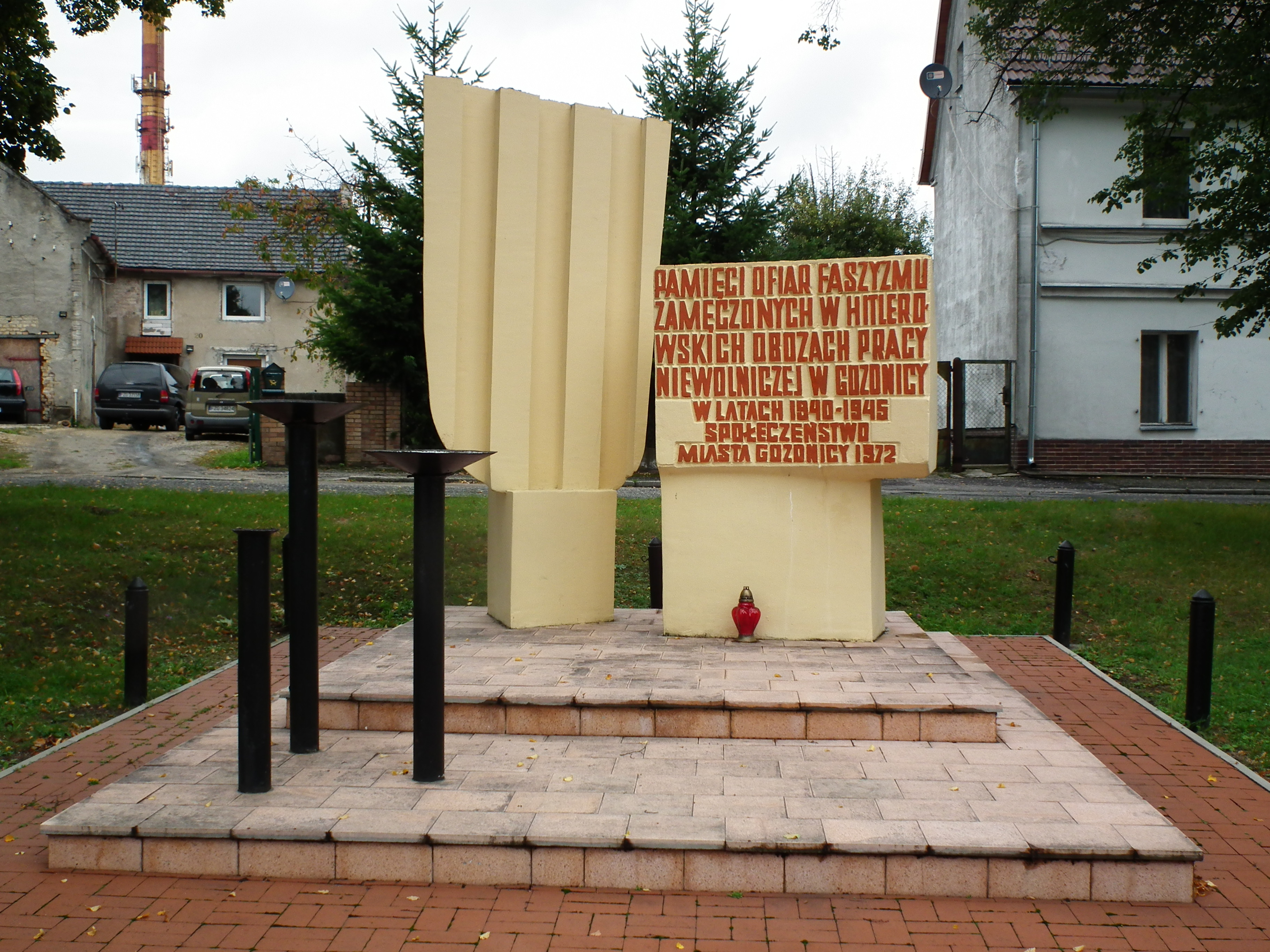
Memorial to victims of forced labour under Nazi Germany

Gozdnica was founded in the 13th century by Duke Przemko of Ścinawa. It formed part of the duchies of Żagań and Jawor, formed in the course of the medieval fragmentation of Poland into smaller duchies. It was granted town rights before 1315. In 1346 it passed to the Kingdom of Bohemia, then in 1353 to Saxony, and in 1364 it returned to the Duchy of Jawor, then in 1413 to the Duchy of Żagań. Town rights were revoked in 1752, and eventually restored in 1967. On 1 December 1896, a railway station opened. Passenger trains were in service until 1962, with freight trains being withdrawn in 1999. The last train was a heritage train, in 2002. The railway line from Ruszów remained operational until 2005.

During World War II, Nazi Germany operated a forced labour camp for Jews.

In 2016, the village of Dębówek became administratively part of Gozdnica. Prior to the change, the village was in the Lower Silesian Voivodeship, within Gmina Węgliniec, Zgorzelec County.

== Villages ==
The following villages are administratively part of Gozdnica:

- Dębówek

== Transport ==
Voivodeship roads number 300 and 350 pass through Gozdnica.

== Twin towns – sister cities ==
Gozdnica is twinned with:

- Hähnichen, Germany
- Oldřichov v Hájích, Czech Republic
