= Lusatian Railway Company =

Former German railway company

Lusatian Railway Company Lausitzer Eisenbahn-Gesellschaft
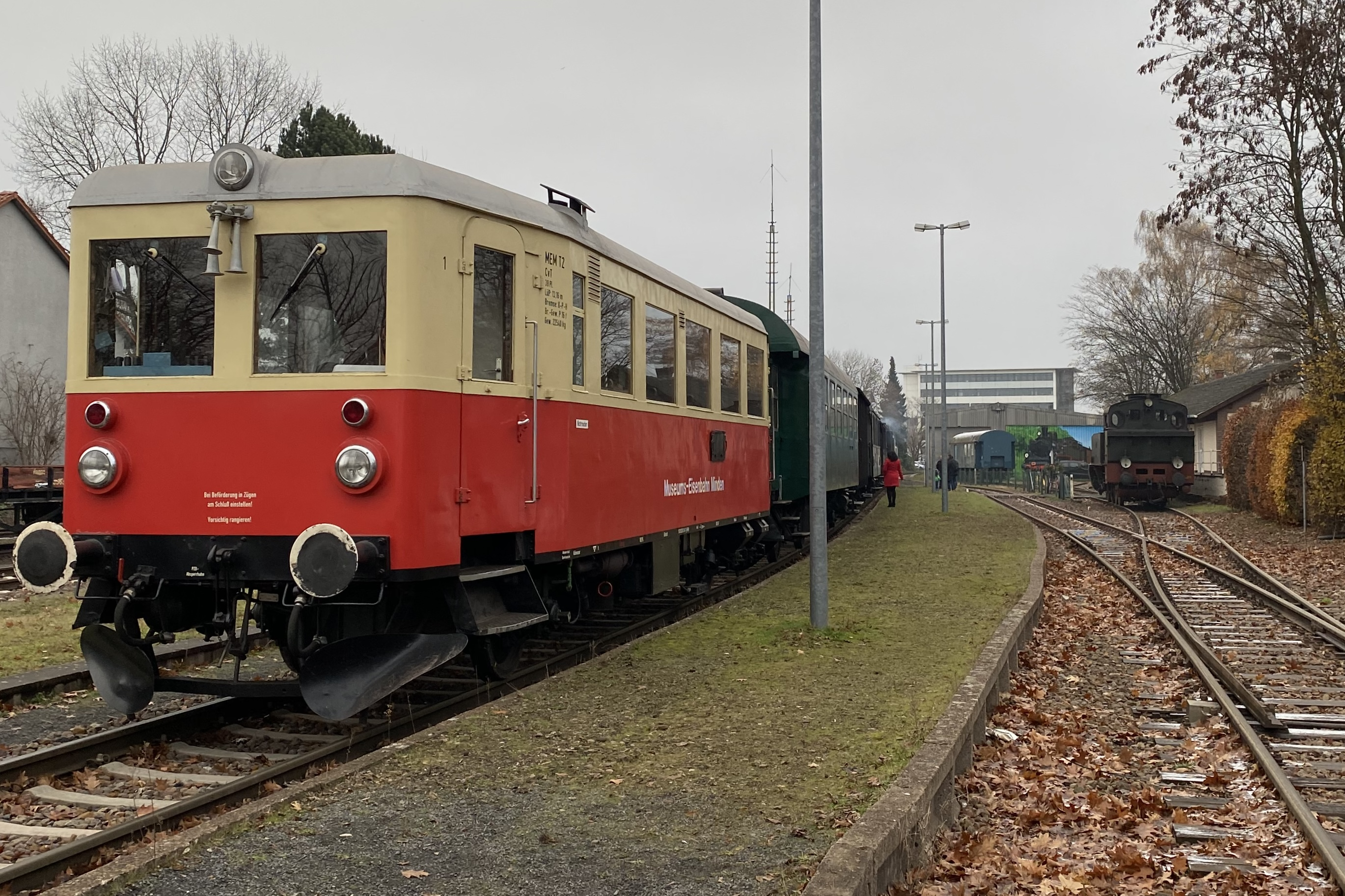
- Preserved 1935 type T2 diesel railcar at the Minden Museum Railway
- Industry: Rail Transport
- Founded: 21 March 1896
- Defunct: 1 January 1939
- Successor: Deutsche Reichsbahn
- Headquarters: Sommerfeld
- Parent: Lokalbahn AG

The Lusatian Railway Company (German: Lausitzer Eisenbahn-Gesellschaft; LEG) was a German railway company which operated railway lines in Lusatia, as well as Lower Silesia, both modern day Poland and Germany. The company was based in Sommerfeld (now Lubsko), and was a subsidiary of Lokalbahn AG, which was based in Munich.

Until its nationalisation in 1939, the company operated four railway lines: Ruszów–Gozdnica, Lubsko–Muskau, Jankowa Żagańska–Przewoź, and Muskau–Weißwasser.

== History ==
The company was founded on 21 March, 1896. Its first railway line, the Ruszów–Gozdnica railway opened on 1 December, 1896. The 8.42 km (5.23 mi) line branched off the Miłkowice–Jasień railway.

The second railway line opened was the Lubsko–Muskau railway, via Tuplice. The northern section opened first, on 1 October 1897, with the southern section opening on 15 June 1898, which made the line a total of 42.7 km (26.5 mi) long. In the same year, the company took over the 7.7 km (4.8 mi) long Muskau–Weißwasser railway, which was previously owned by the Berlin-Görlitz Railway Company, opened on 15 October 1872.

On 1 April 1901 the company took over the Jankowa Żagańska–Przewoź railway, which was previously opened on 1 October 1895. The line was extended to Przysieka in Dąbrowa Łużycka on 1 October 1913, but this line closed in 1936. By 1913, the company had operated 87 km (54 mi) of railway lines. The Ruszów–Gozdnica railway was planned to be extended to Przewoź would have created a continuous Lusatian railway network, was never constructed due to World War I.

On 1 January 1939, the Lusatian Railway Company was nationalised, being taken over by the Deutsche Reichsbahn. Lokalbahn AG was nationalised the year prior on 1 August. After World War II, the area east of the Oder–Neisse line was placed under Polish administration. Almost all railway lines previously owned by the company now lie in modern-day Poland, being fully or partially abandoned, or owned and operated by Polish State Railways.
