= Ruszów =

Village in Lower Silesian Voivodeship, Poland

- Village
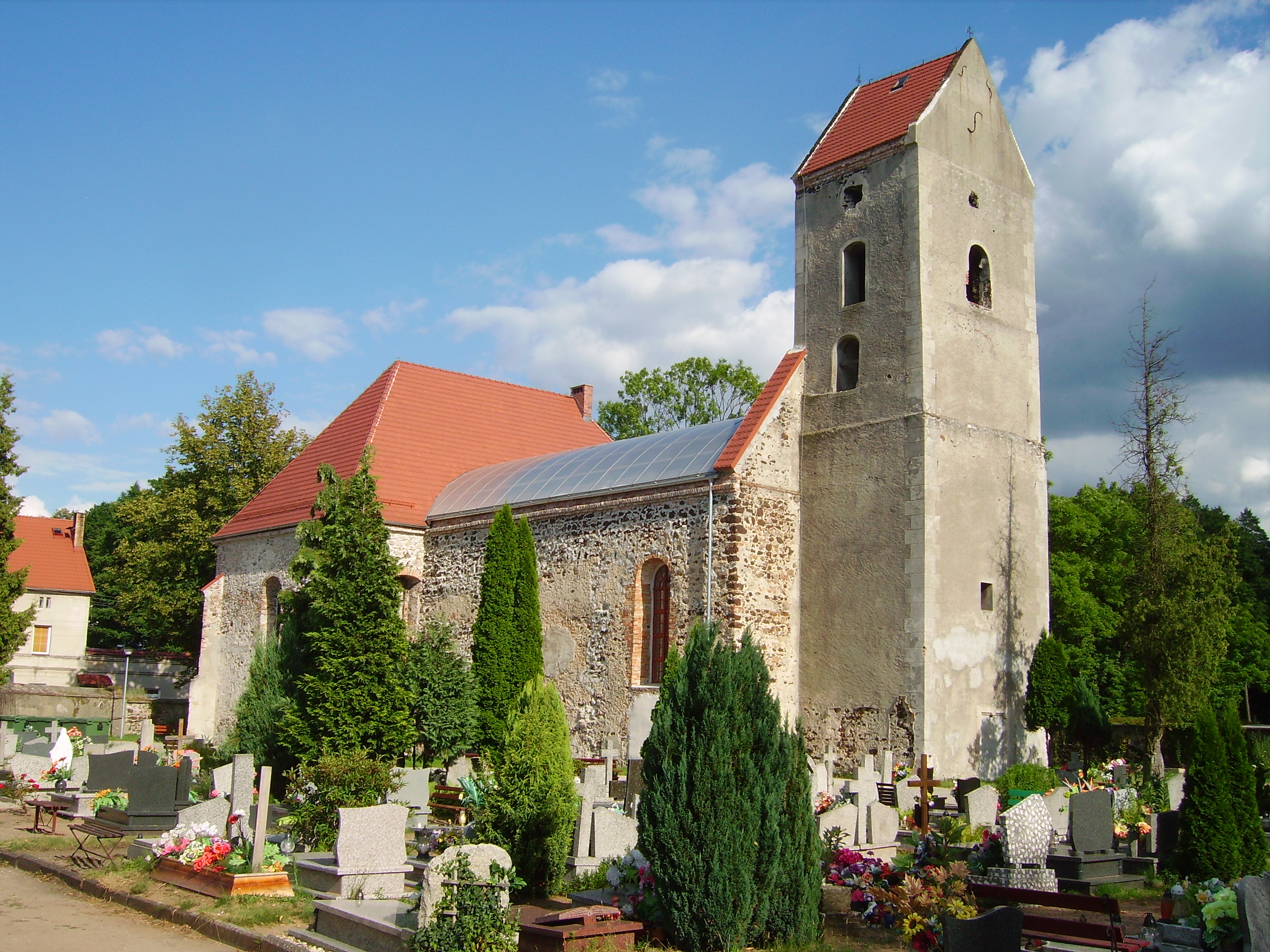
- Renovated ruins of the Protestant church

- Location within Poland
- Coordinates: 51°24′02″N 15°10′59″E
- Country: Poland
- Voivodeship: Lower Silesian
- County: Zgorzelec
- Gmina: Węgliniec
- Population (2021): 1,555
- Time zone: UTC+1 (CET)
  - Summer (DST): UTC+2 (CEST)
- Postal code: 59-950
- Website: http://www.ruszow.pl ruszow.pl

Ruszów [ˈruʂuf] (German: Rauscha; Upper Sorbian: Ružow) is a village in the administrative district of Gmina Węgliniec, within Zgorzelec County, Lower Silesian Voivodeship, in south-western Poland. Ruszów is located in the historic region of Upper Lusatia. The village is served by Ruszów railway station.

== History ==
During World War II the Germans established and operated a subcamp of the Gross-Rosen concentration camp in the village, whose prisoners were Jews.

In the final stages of World War II, a temporary hospital of the Second Polish Army was located in the village.

== Gallery ==
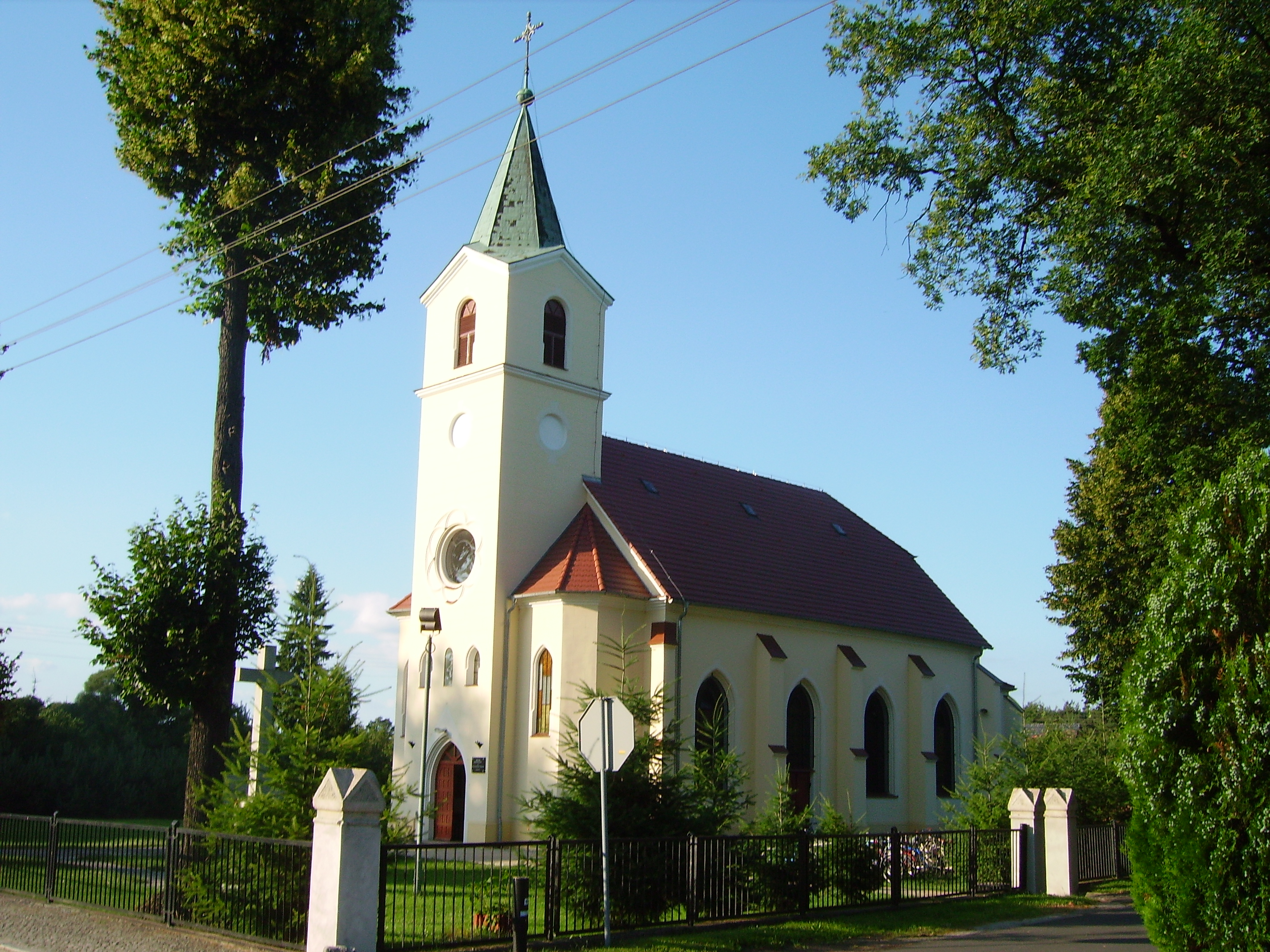
Church of the Resurrection of Christ

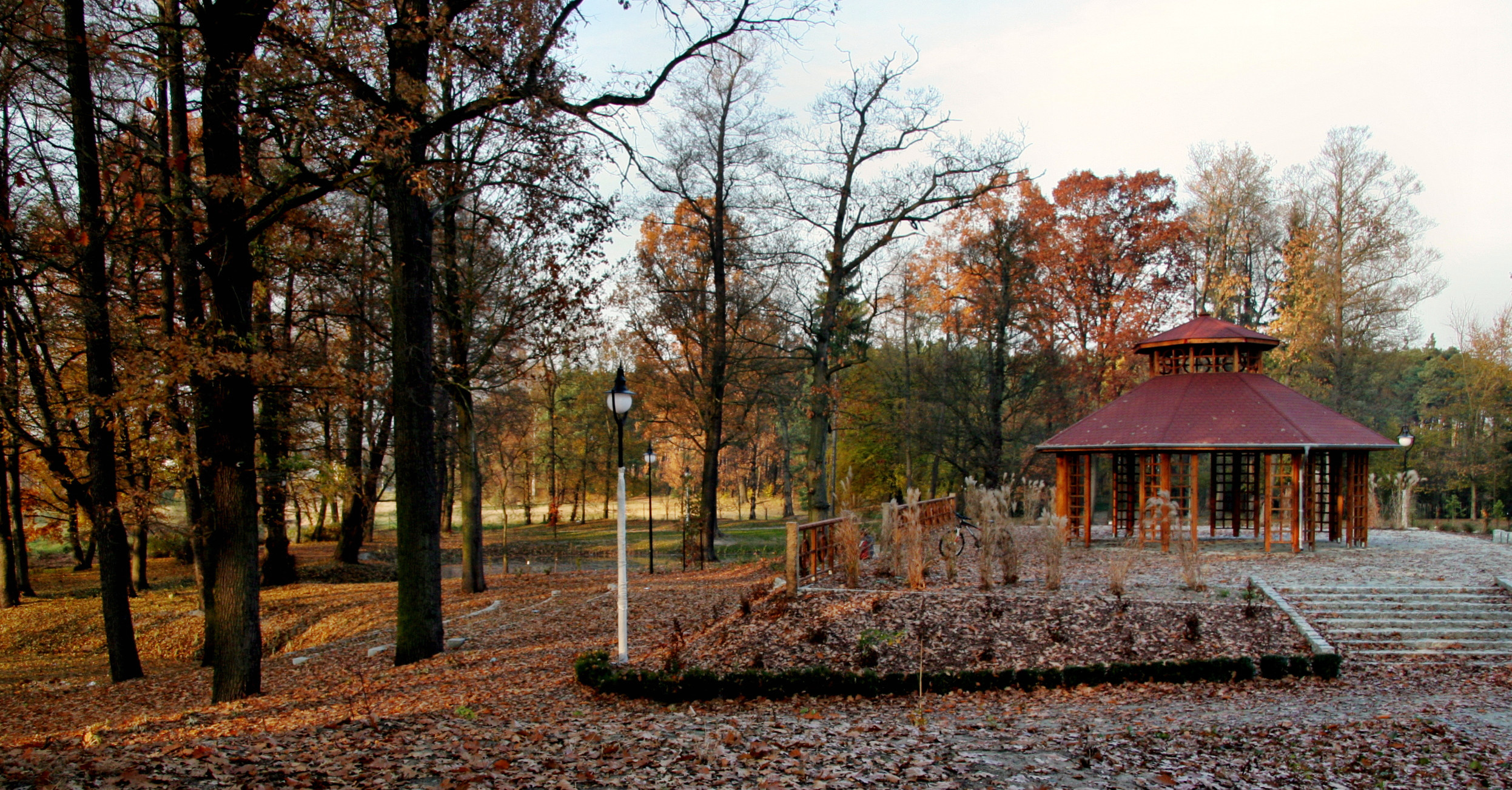
Park in Ruszów

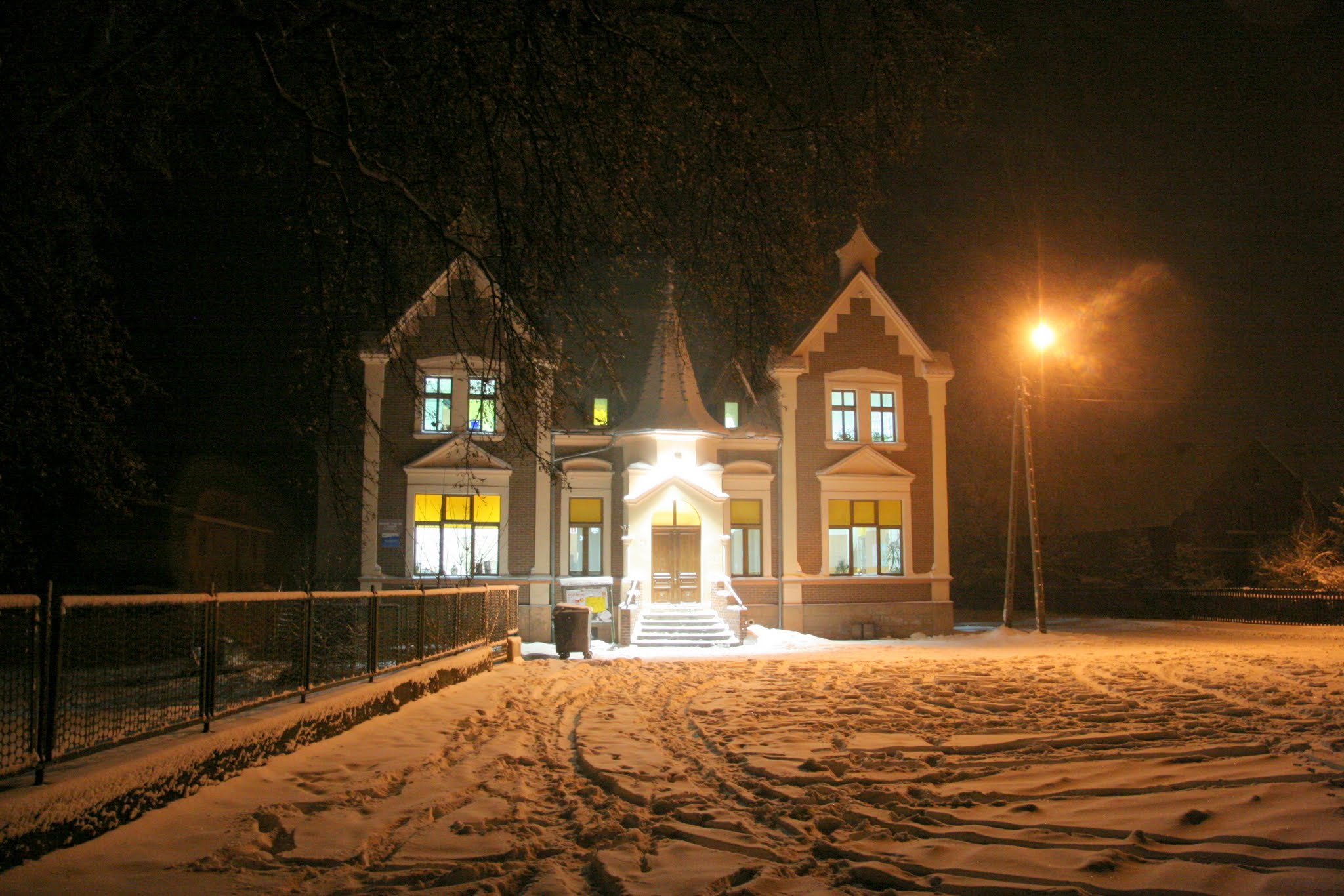
Culture centre

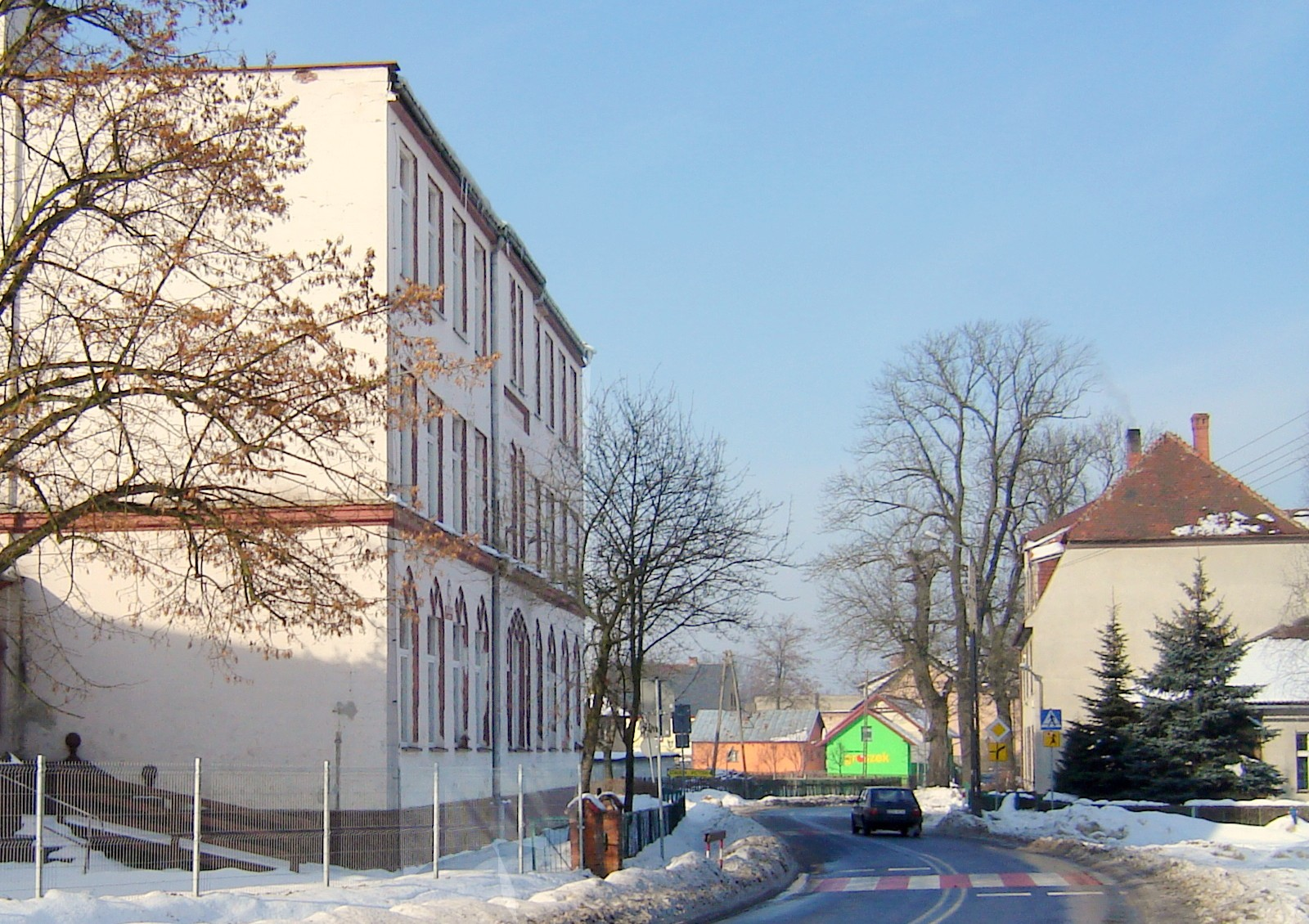
Elementary school

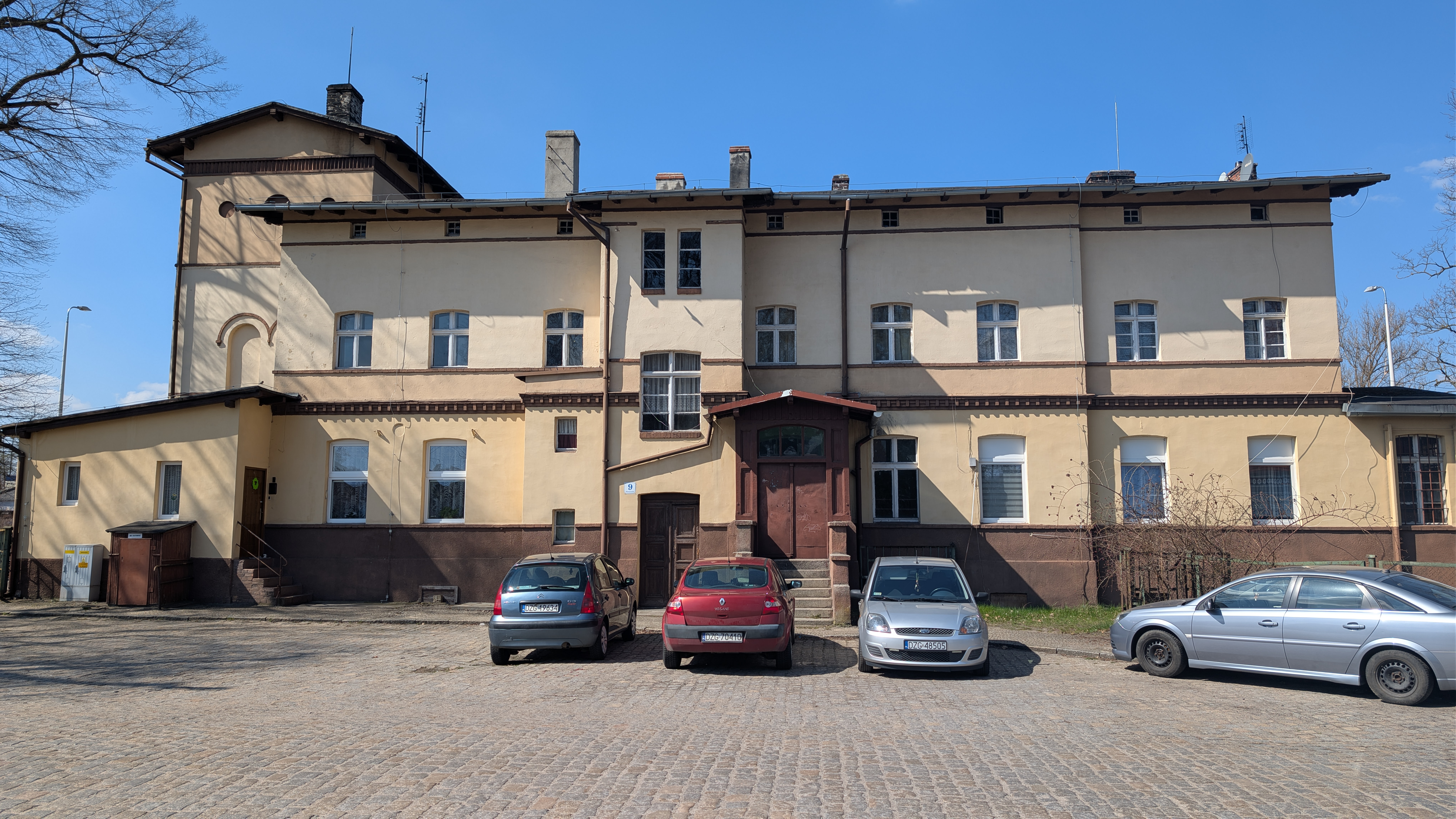
Ruszów railway station
