= Pieńsk railway station =

Railway station in Pieńsk Węgliniec, Poland

Pieńsk
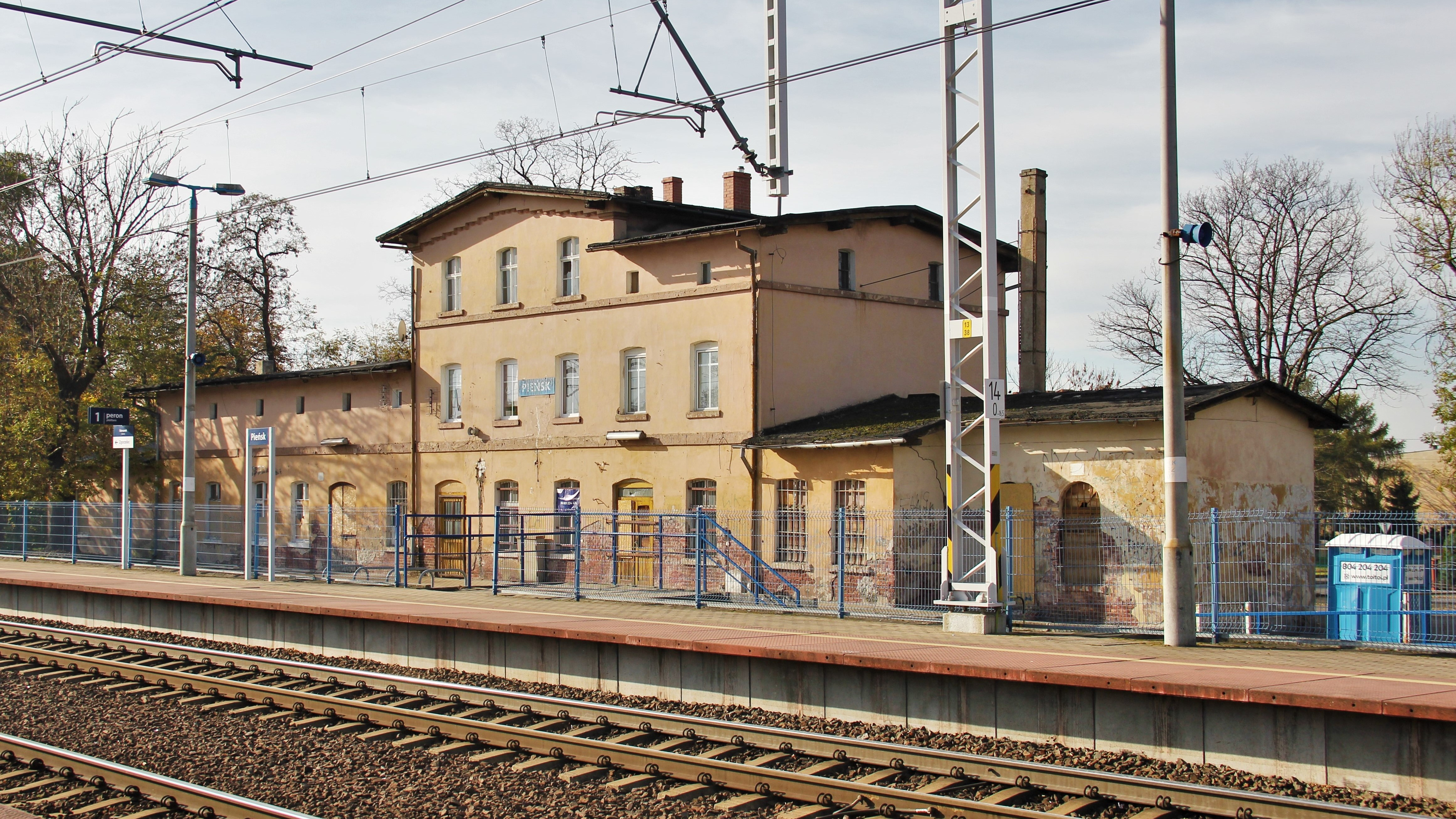
- View of the station building from platform 2

General information
- Location: Pieńsk, Lower Silesian Voivodeship; Poland
- Coordinates: 51°14′42.1″N 15°02′48.0″E
- Owner: Polskie Koleje Państwowe S.A.
- Lines: Węgliniec–Görlitz railway
- Platforms: 2

History
- Opened: 15 November 1846
- Electrified: December 2019
- Former names: Penzig (Oberlausitz) (before 1945)

Services
Preceding station	PKP Intercity	Following station
Węgliniec towards Warszawa Wschodnia	IC	Zgorzelec Miasto towards Zgorzelec
Preceding station	KD	Following station
Węgliniec towards Wrocław Główny	D10	Lasów towards Dresden Hauptbahnhof
Location
- Location within Poland Location within Lower Silesian Voivodeship

Pieńsk (German: Penzig) is a railway station in the town of Pieńsk, Zgorzelec County, within the Lower Silesian Voivodeship, in south-western Poland.

== History ==
The station opened on 15 November 1846 as Penzig (Oberlausitz). After World War II, the area past the Lusatian Neisse and Oder rivers came under Polish administration. As a result, the station was taken over by Polish State Railways and was renamed to Pieńsk.

Numerous railway sidings once branched off from the station directly into glassworks. However, most of these sidings are now dismantled or abandoned. There are also remains of an old water tower, in the north-eastern part of the station.

Electrification of the Węgliniec–Görlitz railway was completed in December 2019.

== Train services ==
Train services are operated by PKP Intercity and Lower Silesian Railways.

The station is served by the following services:

- Intercity services (IC) Zgorzelec - Legnica - Wrocław - Ostrów Wielkopolski - Łódź - Warszawa
- Regional services (KD) Wrocław - Legnica - Zgorzelec - Görlitz

== Gallery ==
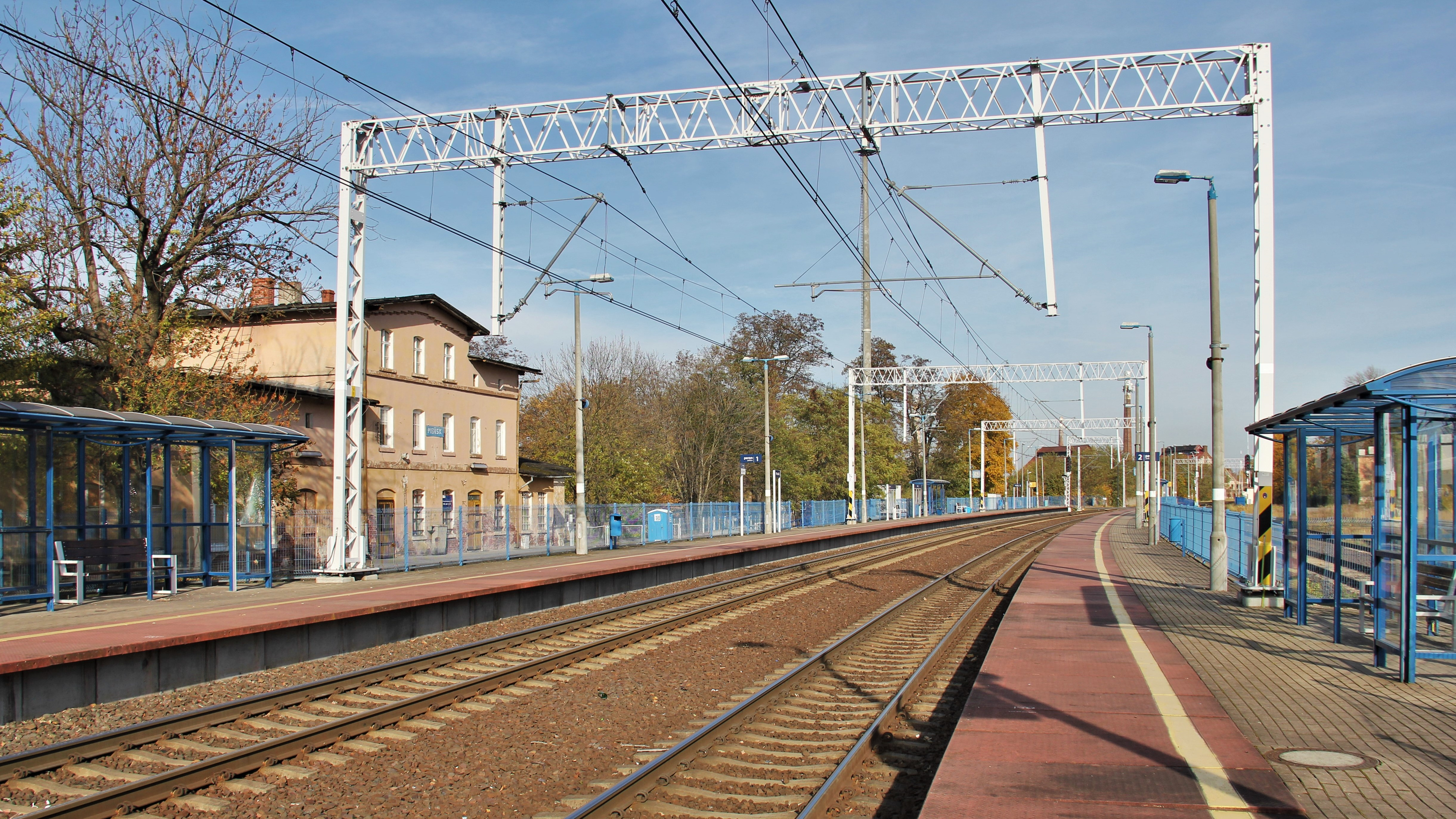
Platforms

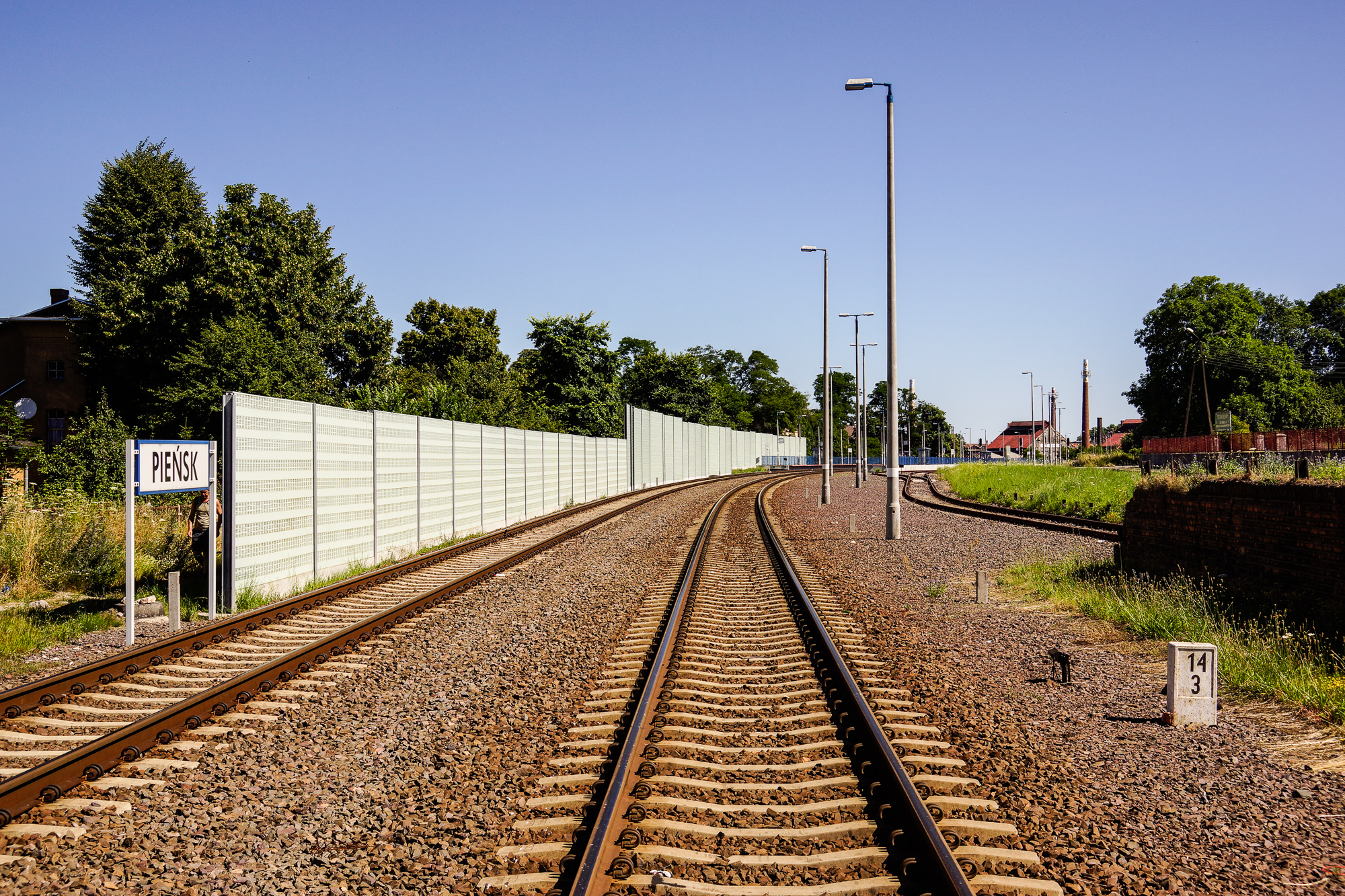
Line (before electrification)

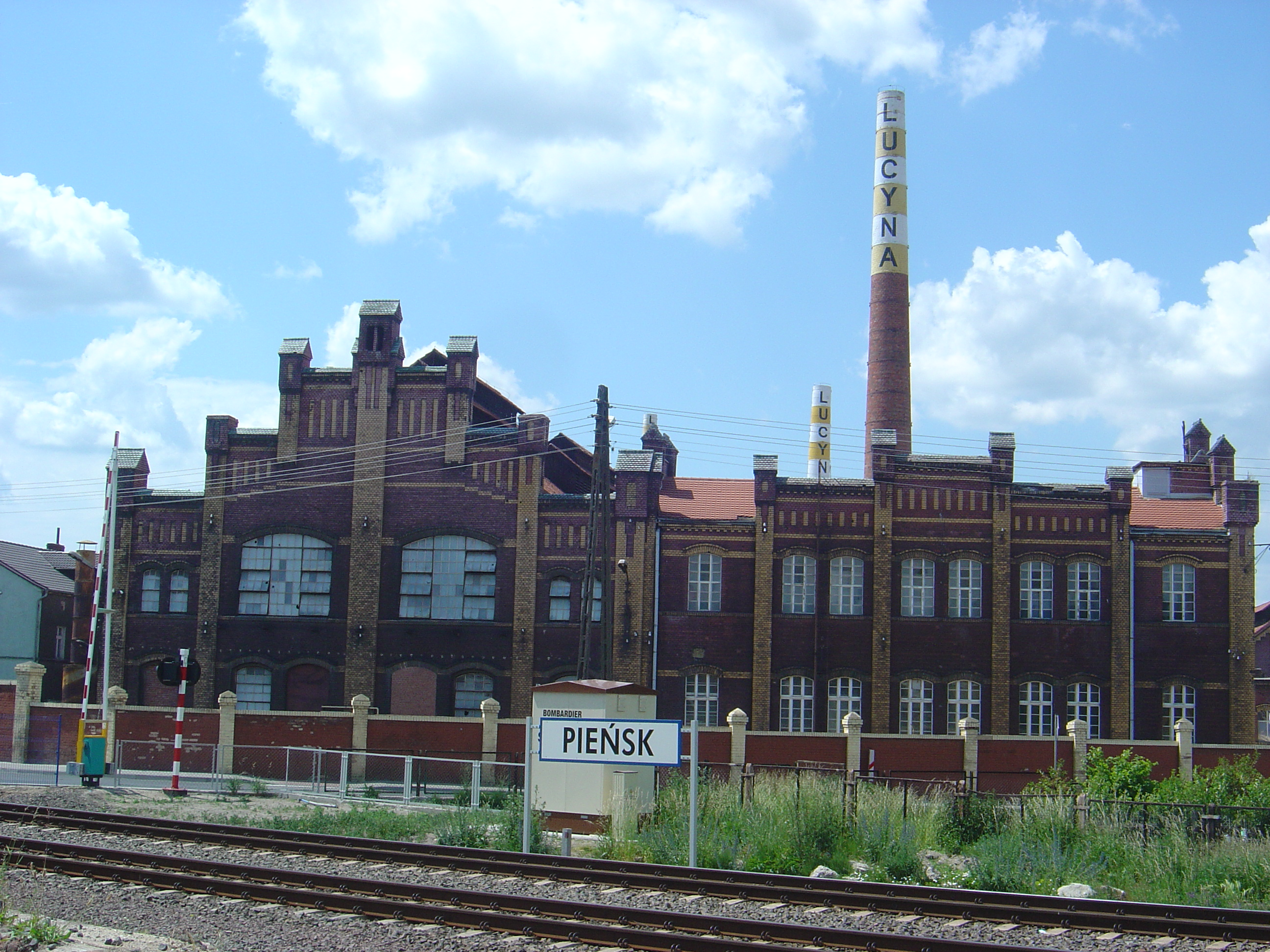
Glass factory
