= Jędrzychowice, Zgorzelec County =

Jędrzychowice
- Village
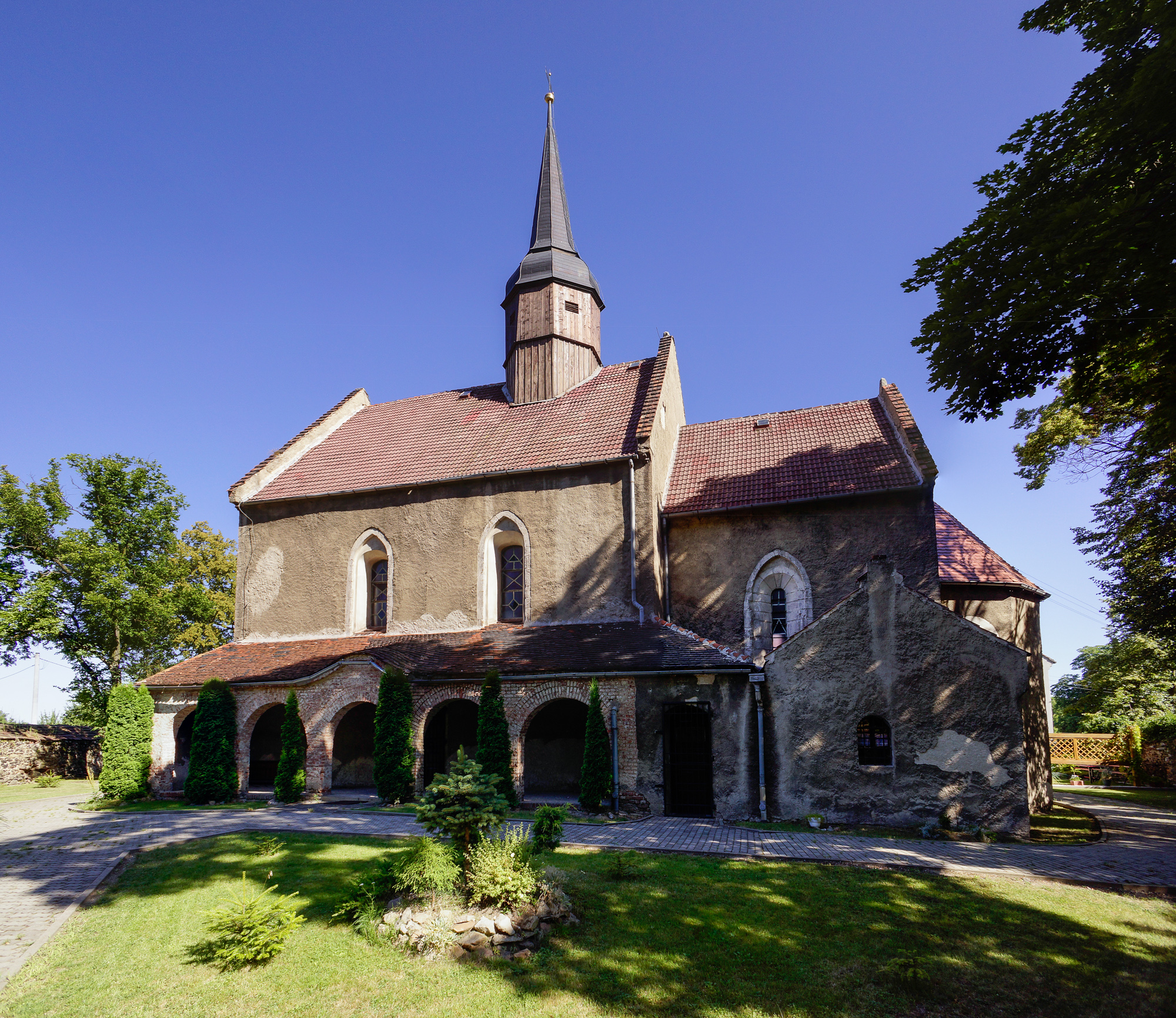
- Parish Church

- Location within Poland
- Coordinates: 51°10′50″N 15°01′24″E
- Country: Poland
- Voivodeship: Lower Silesian
- County: Zgorzelec
- Gmina: Zgorzelec
- Population (2021): 799
- Postal code: 59-900
- Area code: +48 75
- Vehicle registration: DZG

Jędrzychowice [jɛndʐɨxɔˈvit͡sɛ] (German: Hennersdorf; Upper Sorbian: Jědrzychowice) is a village in the administrative district of Gmina Zgorzelec, within Zgorzelec County, Lower Silesian Voivodeship, in south-western Poland, close to the German border.

Jędrzychowice lies on the eastern bank of the Lusatian Neisse river within the historical region of Upper Lusatia. It is known as the site of a road border crossing of the Polish A4 autostrada with the German Bundesautobahn 4 at Görlitz-Ludwigsdorf. Border controls have been abolished upon the accession of Poland to the Schengen Area in 2007.

== History ==
The village was first mentioned in 1321 when it belonged to the Duchy of Jawor.

== Transport ==
The village is served by Jędrzychowice railway station on the Węgliniec–Görlitz railway.

== Gallery ==
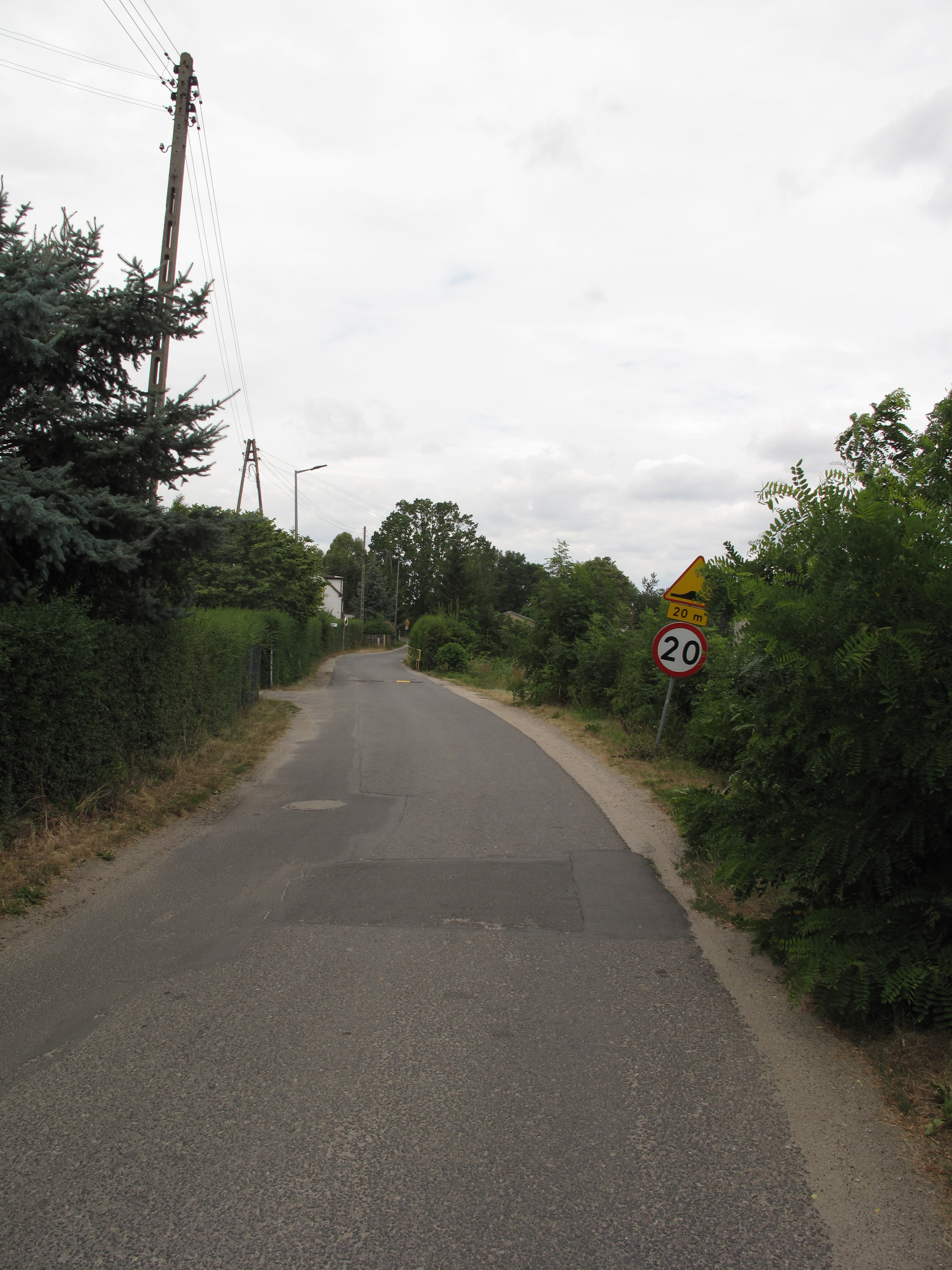
Street

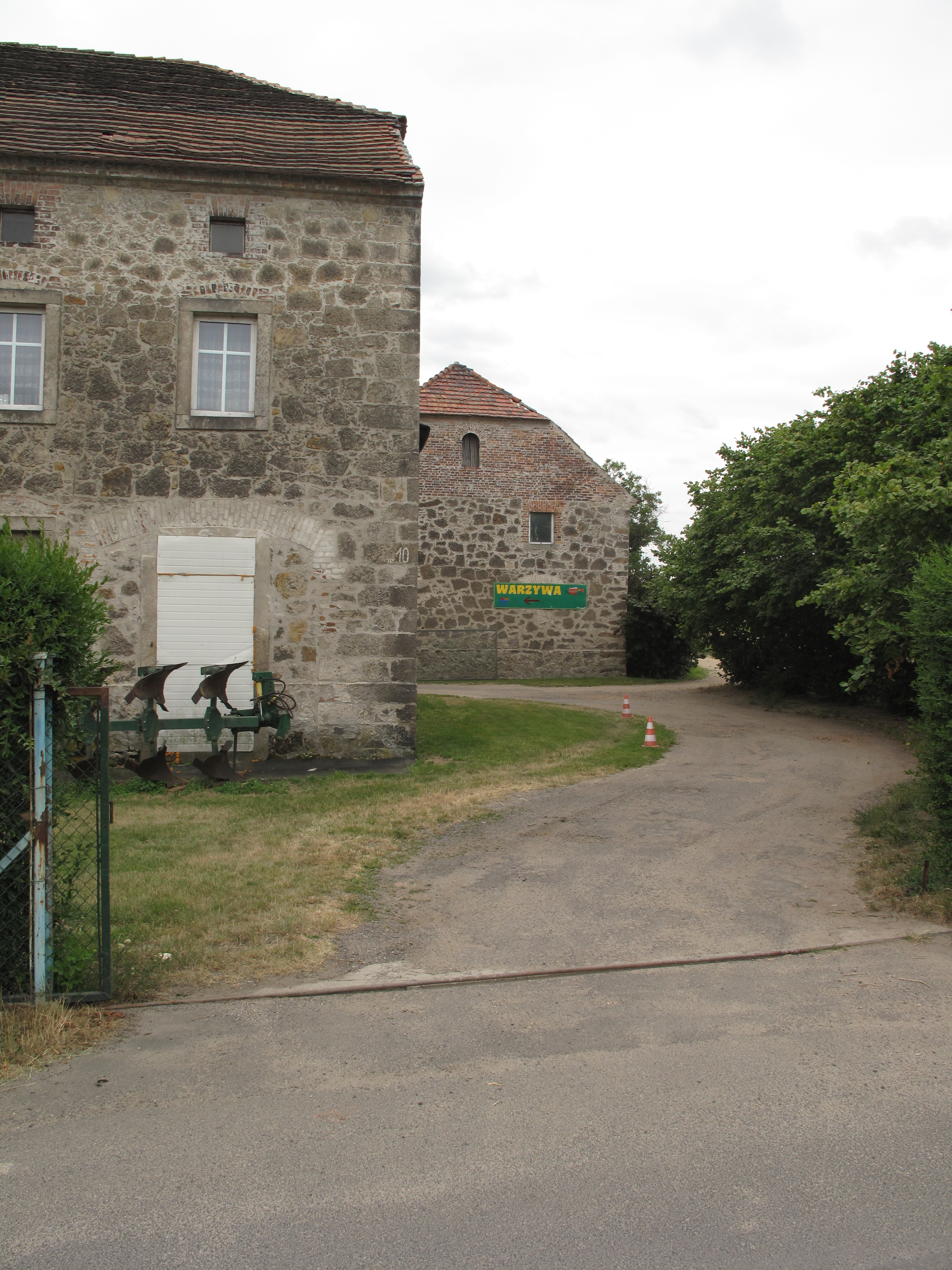
Houses

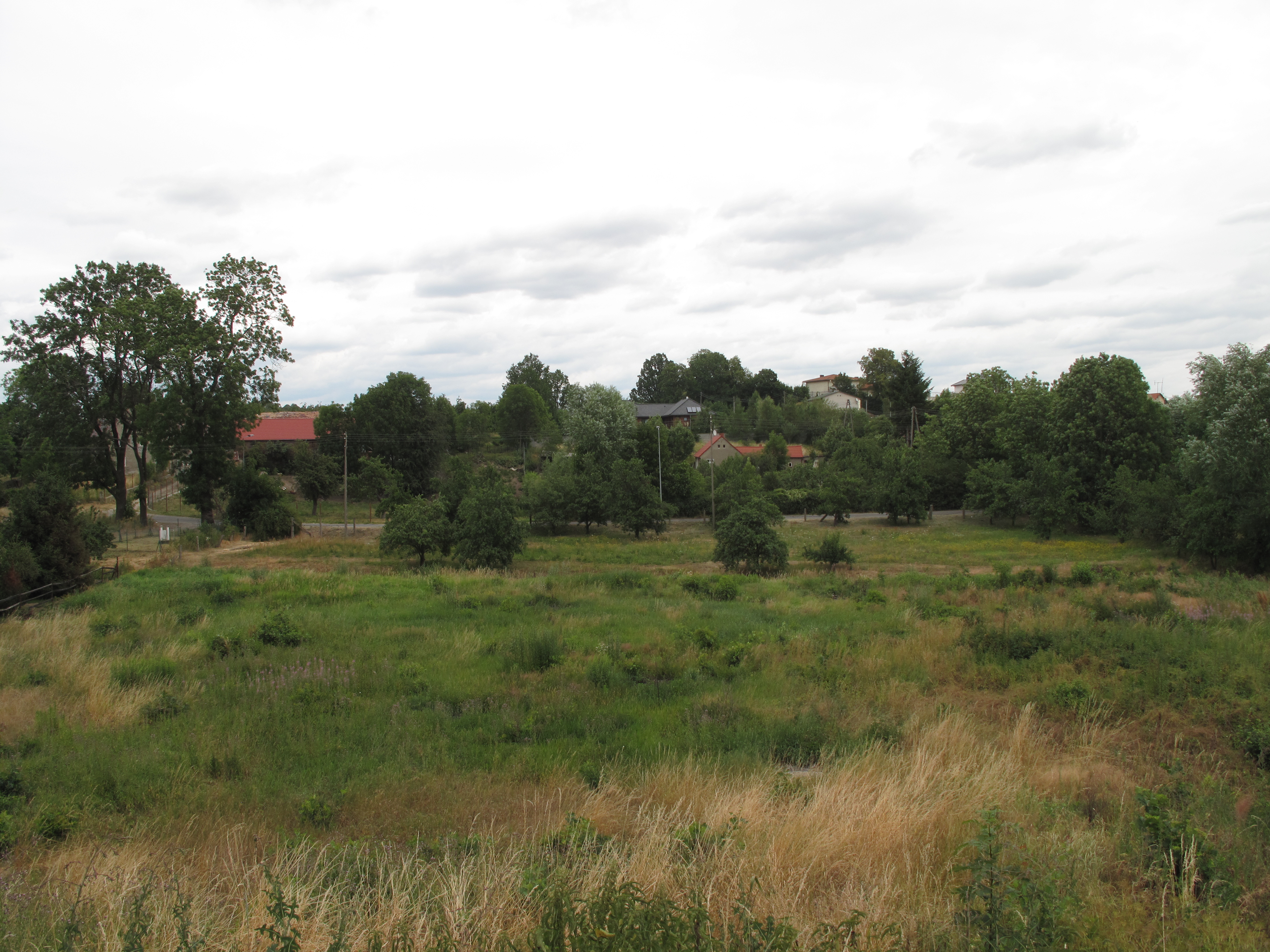
Trees with houses
