= Pieńsk =

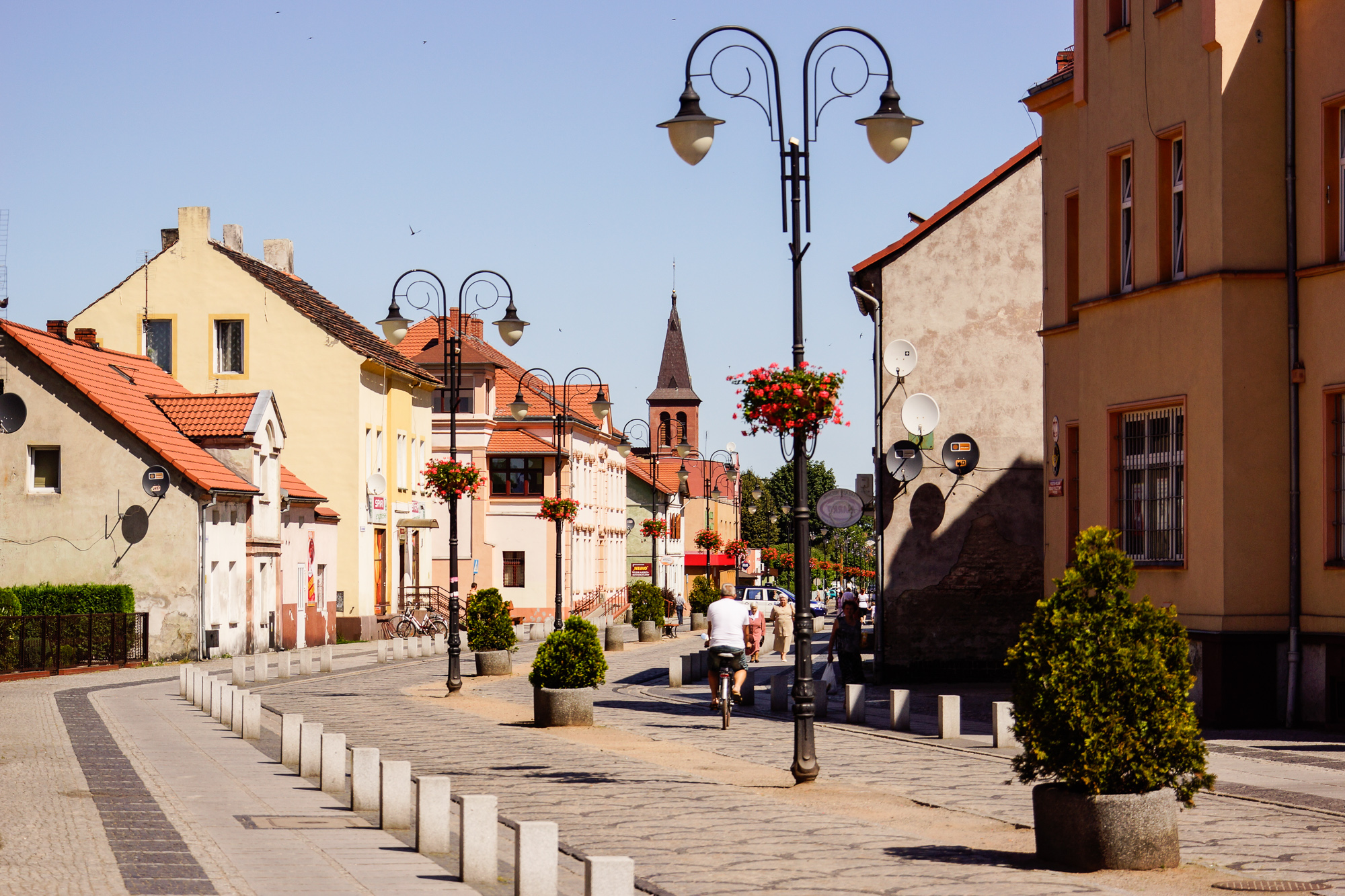
- Main promenade in Pieńsk

- Flag Coat of arms

- Location within Poland
- Coordinates: 51°14′47″N 15°2′46″E
- Country: Poland
- Voivodeship: Lower Silesian
- County: Zgorzelec
- Gmina: Pieńsk
- First mentioned: 965
- Town rights: 1962

Government
  - Mayor: Janusz Pawul

Area
  - Total: 9.92 km^{2} (3.83 sq mi)

Population (2019-06-30)
  - Total: 5,828
  - Density: 587/km^{2} (1,520/sq mi)
- Time zone: UTC+1 (CET)
  - Summer (DST): UTC+2 (CEST)
- Postal code: 59-930
- Car plates: DZG
- Climate: Cfb
- Website: http://www.piensk.com.pl

Pieńsk [pʲɛɲsk] (German: Penzig; Upper Sorbian: Pjeńsk) is a town in Zgorzelec County, Lower Silesian Voivodeship, in south-western Poland. It is the seat of the administrative district (gmina) called Gmina Pieńsk, and stands on the east bank of the Lusatian Neisse river, which forms the border between Poland and Germany. As of 2019, it has a population of 5,828. Historically considered as part of Upper Lusatia, although more closely associated with Lower Silesia in the early 14th century and from 1815.

== History ==
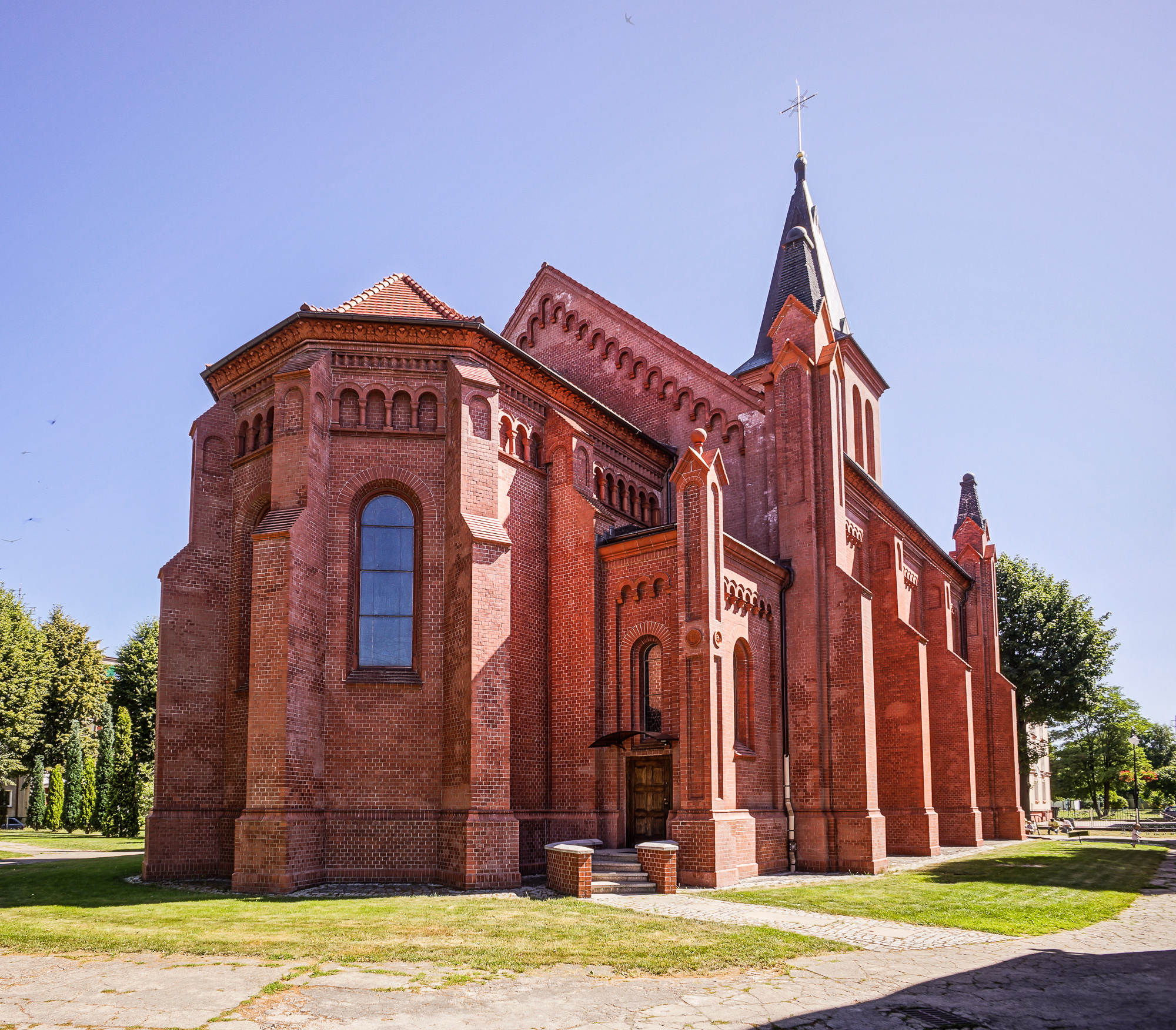
Saint Francis of Assisi church

In the Early Middle Ages, Pieńsk was a stronghold of the Bieżuńczanie tribe, one of the Polish tribes. The oldest known mention of the settlement dates back to 965. Its name is of Slavic origin, and comes from the word pień, which means "trunk". It was included in the early Polish state by first Polish King Bolesław I the Brave and in the 11th century it passed to the Duchy of Bohemia, which was elevated to a kingdom in 1198. The Upper Lusatian lords of Penzig (von Penzig) are first recorded in 1241. Besides Pieńsk the family held a number of other towns and territories on both banks of the Lusatian Neisse river. In 1250 a castle was built. In 1321 local Polish Duke Henry I of Jawor confirmed the rights of the Penzig family to the settlement.

From the 14th century until 1815 at various times Pieńsk was under the rule of local Polish dukes of the Piast dynasty, kings of Bohemia, Hungary, electors of Saxony and kings of Poland. In 1491 the city of Görlitz purchased the Penziger Heide (parts of the territory of Penzig) and combined it as Görlitzer Heide with its own communal territory. These territories were previously also owned by the Penzig family. In 1815 it was annexed by Prussia, and, subsequently, in 1871 it became part of Germany. In 1841 it suffered a fire.

During World War II, there was a military hospital in the village, in which initially Polish, and later also French and Yugoslavian prisoners of war were kept. The first 493 wounded Polish prisoners of war arrived to the hospital on September 22, 1939, during the joint German-Soviet invasion of Poland, which started the war. Meetings of Polish prisoners of war, joint singing and Polish church services took place in the hospital. Overall, 42 Polish prisoners of war died in the hospital, and the bodies of the deceased were burned on the spot and buried at the local cemetery. There is a monument dedicated to them at the cemetery. The Germans also established the RAD-Lager 5/104 forced labour camp in the village. The Polish Second Army fought nearby on April 16–17, 1945, during the final stages of the war. After the defeat of Nazi Germany in 1945, Pieńsk became again part of Poland. In accordance to the Potsdam Agreement, the German population was expelled and the settlement was resettled by Poles, many of whom were displaced from former eastern Poland annexed by the Soviet Union.

In 1962 Pieńsk was granted town rights. Since 1999 it is administratively part of the Lower Silesian Voivodeship.

== Transport ==
=== Road ===
Voivodeship roads number 351 and 353 pass through Pieńsk.

=== Rail ===
Since 1846, Pieńsk railway station has served the town, and is on the Węgliniec–Görlitz railway. Both regional and intercity services call here.

== Notable residents ==
- Minna Reichert (1869–1946), German politician
- Władysław Filipkowski (1892–1950), Polish military commander
- Gerd Tacke (1906–1997), German businessman
- Anna Zwirydowska (born 1986), Polish female freestyle wrestler
