= Jędrzychowice railway station =

Railway station in south-western Poland

Jędrzychowice

General information
- Location: Jędrzychowice, Lower Silesian Voivodeship; Poland
- Coordinates: 51°10′25″N 15°01′04″E
- Owner: Polskie Koleje Państwowe S.A.
- Line: Węgliniec–Görlitz railway
- Platforms: 2

History
- Opened: 15 November 1846
- Electrified: 15 December 2019
- Former names: Hennersdorf (before 1945)

Services
Preceding station	KD	Following station
Lasów towards Wrocław Główny	D10	Zgorzelec Miasto towards Dresden Hauptbahnhof
Preceding station	Polregio	Following station
Lasów towards Zielona Góra Główna	PR	Zgorzelec Miasto towards Görlitz
Location
- Location within Poland

Jędrzychowice (German: Hennersdorf) is a railway station on the Węgliniec–Görlitz railway in the village of Jędrzychowice, Zgorzelec County, within the Lower Silesian Voivodeship in south-western Poland.

== History ==
The station opened on 15 November 1846 as Hennersdorf, serving temporarily as the western terminus of the Węgliniec–Görlitz railway until the line was extended to Görlitz on 1 September 1847. At the time, four passenger pairs trains ran daily on the line.

In 2007, the station platforms were rebuilt. The line to between Węgliniec and Zgorzelec was fully modernised and electrified on 15 December 2019.

== Train services ==
The station is served by the following service(s):

- Regional services (KD) Wrocław - Legnica - Zgorzelec - Görlitz
