= Lasów railway station =

Railway station in south-western Poland

Lasów
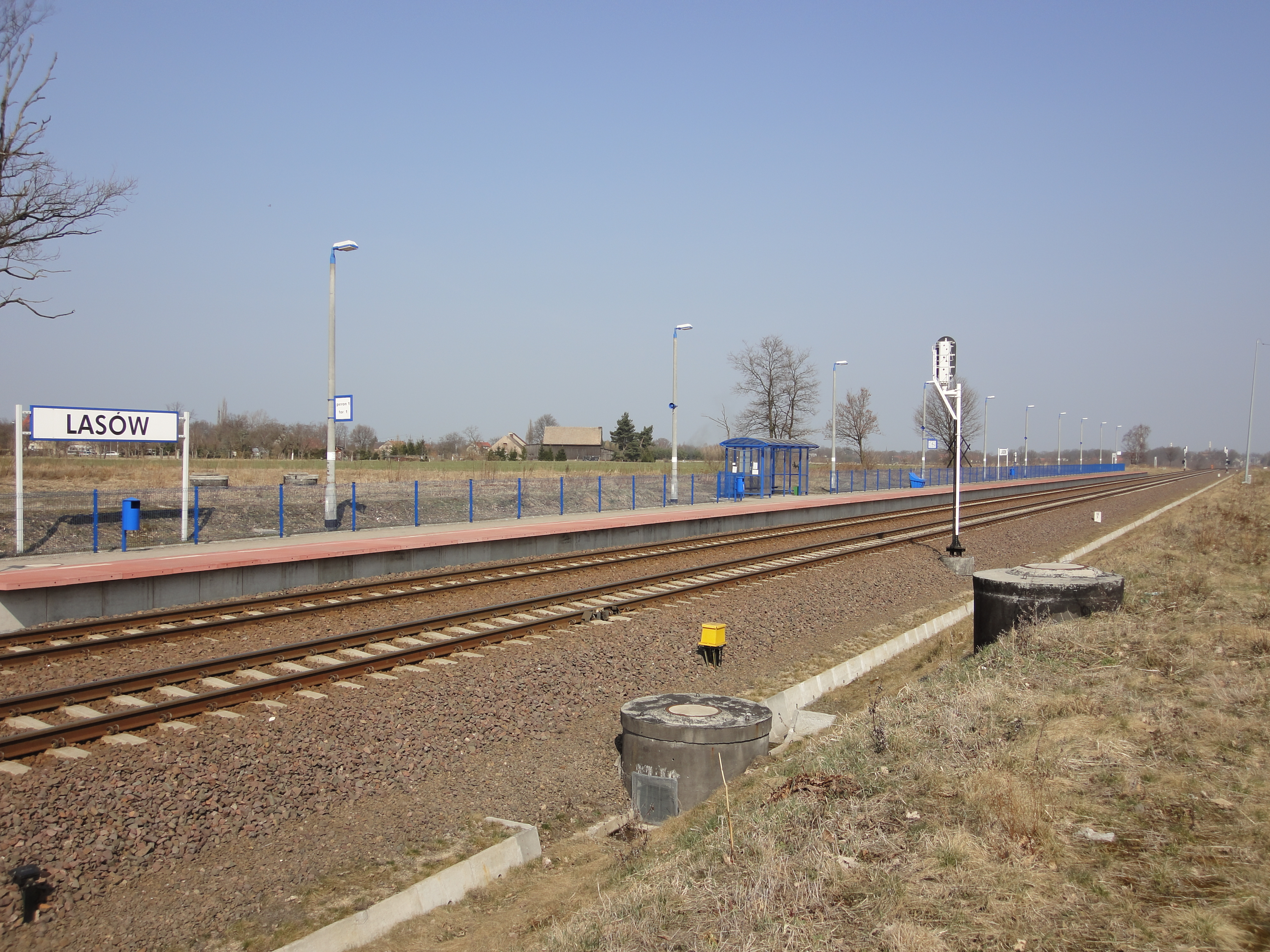
- Platform, before the line was electrified in 2019

General information
- Location: Lasów, Lower Silesian Voivodeship; Poland
- Coordinates: 51°13′28.0″N 15°02′06.0″E
- Owner: Polskie Koleje Państwowe S.A.
- Line: Węgliniec–Görlitz railway
- Platforms: 2

History
- Opened: 1 October 1845
- Electrified: 2019
- Former names: Lissa (Ober/Lausitz) (1910–1920); Lissa (Oberlausitz) (1920–1945); Lisza (1945–1947)

Services
Preceding station	KD	Following station
Pieńsk towards Wrocław Główny	D10	Jędrzychowice towards Dresden Hauptbahnhof
Preceding station	Polregio	Following station
Pieńsk towards Zielona Góra Główna	PR	Jędrzychowice towards Görlitz
Location
- Location within Poland Location within Lower Silesian Voivodeship

Lasów (German: Lissa) is a railway station on the Węgliniec–Görlitz railway in the village of Lasów, Zgorzelec County, within the Lower Silesian Voivodeship in south-western Poland. The platforms of the station are staggered.

== History ==
The station opened in 1910 as Lissa (Ober/Lausitz), which was later renamed to Lissa (Oberlausitz) in 1920. After World War II, the area came under Polish administration. As a result, the station was taken over by Polish State Railways and was renamed to Lisza, and later to its modern name, Lasów, in 1947.

== Train services ==
The station is served by the following services:

- Regional services (KD) Wrocław - Legnica - Zgorzelec - Görlitz
