= Mojs =

Mojs is a masculine given name. It is borne by:

- Mojs I (died after 1233), Hungarian noble and Palatine of Hungary between 1228 and 1231
- Mojs II (died 1280), Hungarian baron and Palatine of Hungary from 1270 to 1272, son of Mojs I
- Mojs I Ákos (died after 1299), Hungarian baron and master of the treasury
- Mojs II Ákos (died 1320), rebellious Hungarian lord, son of Mojs I Ákos

== See also ==
- Morison equation, a fluid dynamics equation sometimes called the MOJS equation (from the initials of its four creators)
- Moys, the German name for Ujazd, Zgorzelec, a district in Poland
