= Penzig family =

German uradel noble family

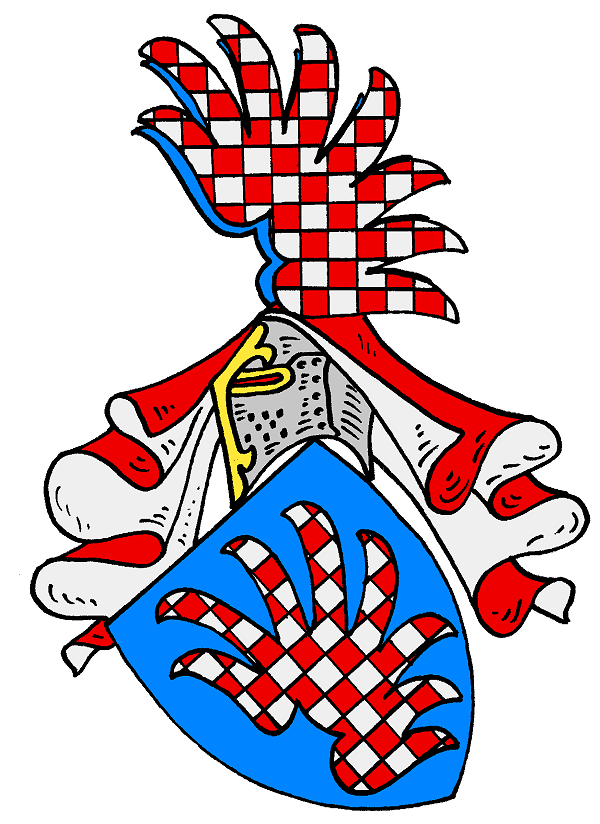
Coat of arms of the family

The Penzig family was a German uradel noble family from the town of Pieńsk (German: Penzig), in what was then the Holy Roman Empire and is now Poland. Including Pieńsk, the family owned a number of other towns and land on both sides of the Lusatian Neisse, which included eastern Upper Lusatia and western Lower Silesia.

== History ==
The family was first mentioned as early as the 13th century, in 1241. In 1250 a castle was built in Pieńsk which was the family's residence. 31 years later, in 1321 local Polish Duke Henry I of Jawor confirmed the rights of the Penzig family to the castle. In 1395, the forest between the Lusatian Neisse and the Czerna Wielka rivers came under the ownership of the family as Penziger Heide.

In 1491 the ownership of the entire town of Penzig (Pieńsk) was taken over by the city Görlitz. To prevent the castle in the town from being used as the family's residence, it was demolished in 1514, with their permission. Penziger Heide was also acquired by the city of Görlitz in 1499.

By the 1790s, the line of men of the family had all died. The remaining heir daughter, Christiane Sophie von Penzig married Johann Friedrich von Prenzel.
