= Statue of Hans Karl von Winterfeldt =

Statue in Berlin, Germany

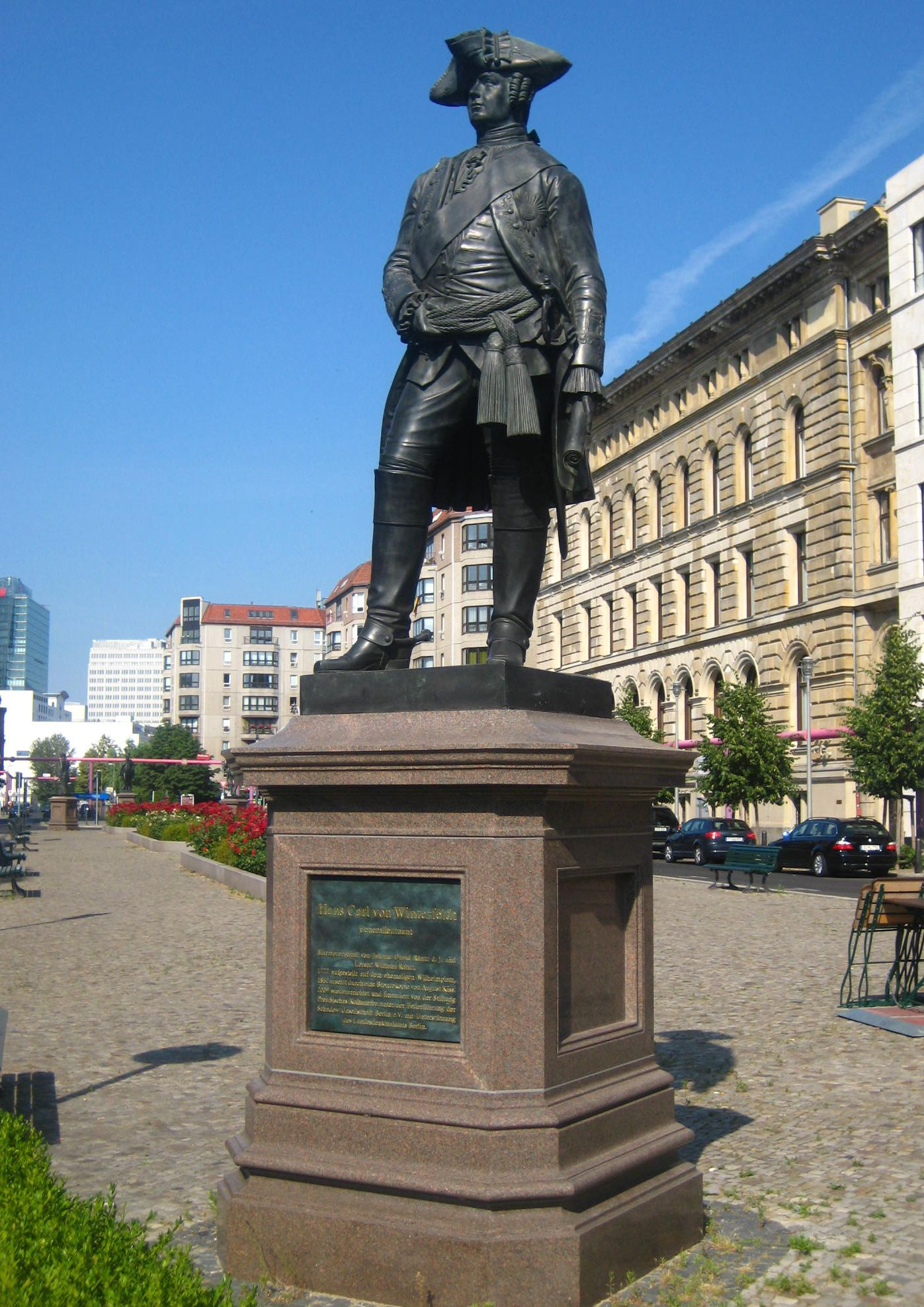
- The sculpture in 2010
- Subject: Hans Karl von Winterfeldt
- Location: Berlin, Germany

The statue of Hans Karl von Winterfeldt is a bronze sculpture installed at Zietenplatz in Berlin, Germany.
