= Lasów =

- Village
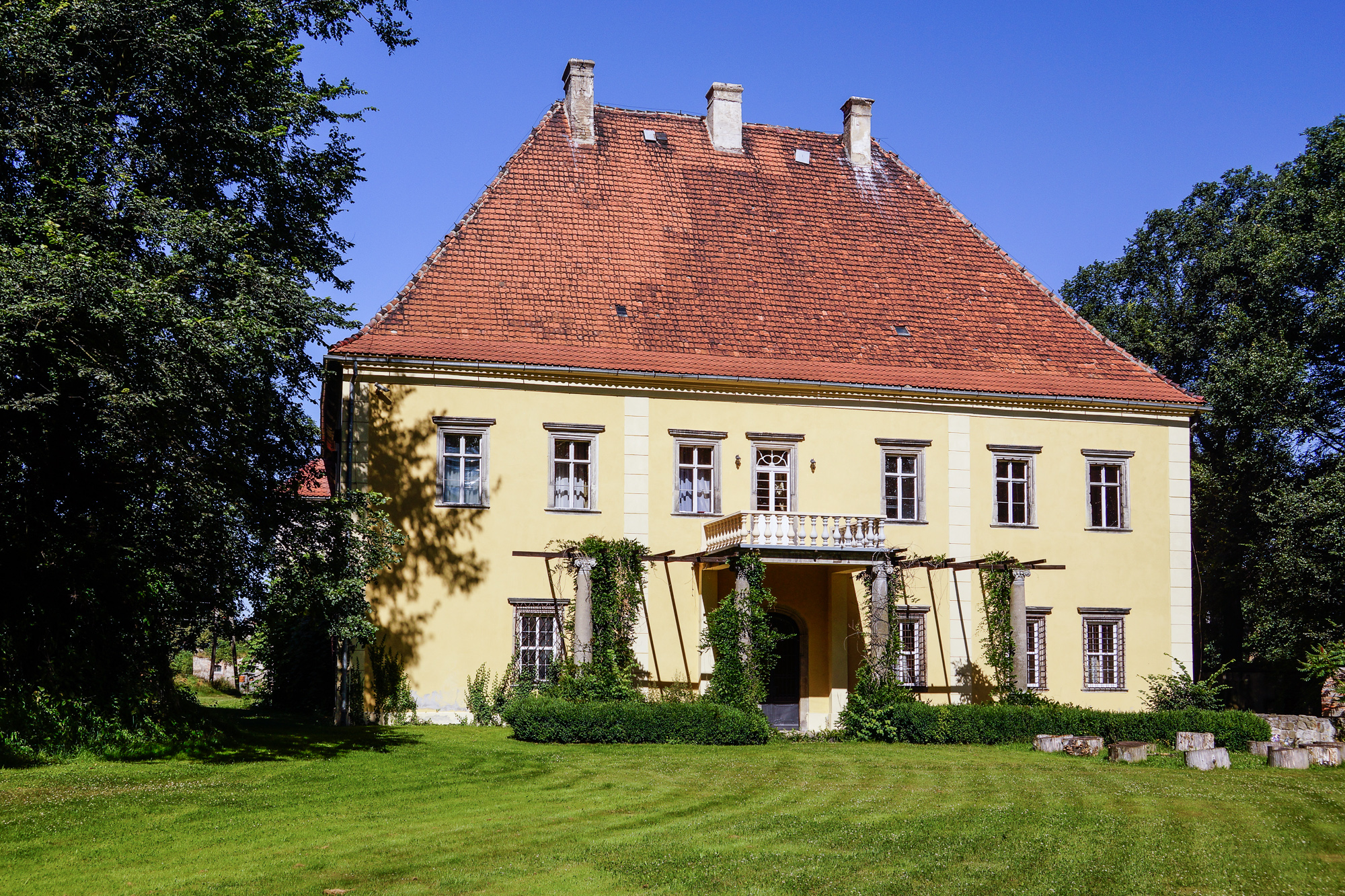
- Lasów Palace

- Location within Poland
- Coordinates: 51°14′N 15°2′E
- Country: Poland
- Voivodeship: Lower Silesian
- County: Zgorzelec
- Gmina: Pieńsk

Population
  - Total: 528
- Time zone: UTC+1 (CET)
  - Summer (DST): UTC+2 (CEST)
- Postal code: 59-930
- Vehicle registration: DZG

Lasów [ˈlasuf] (Upper Sorbian: Lěsy) is a village in the administrative district of Gmina Pieńsk, within Zgorzelec County, Lower Silesian Voivodeship, in south-western Poland, close to the German border.

== Etymology ==
The name of the village is of Slavic origin, and is derived from the word las, which means "forest".

== Transport ==
The village is served by Lasów railway station.
