= Zgorzelec Miasto railway station =

Railway station in Zgorzelec, Poland

Zgorzelec Miasto Zgorzelec Town
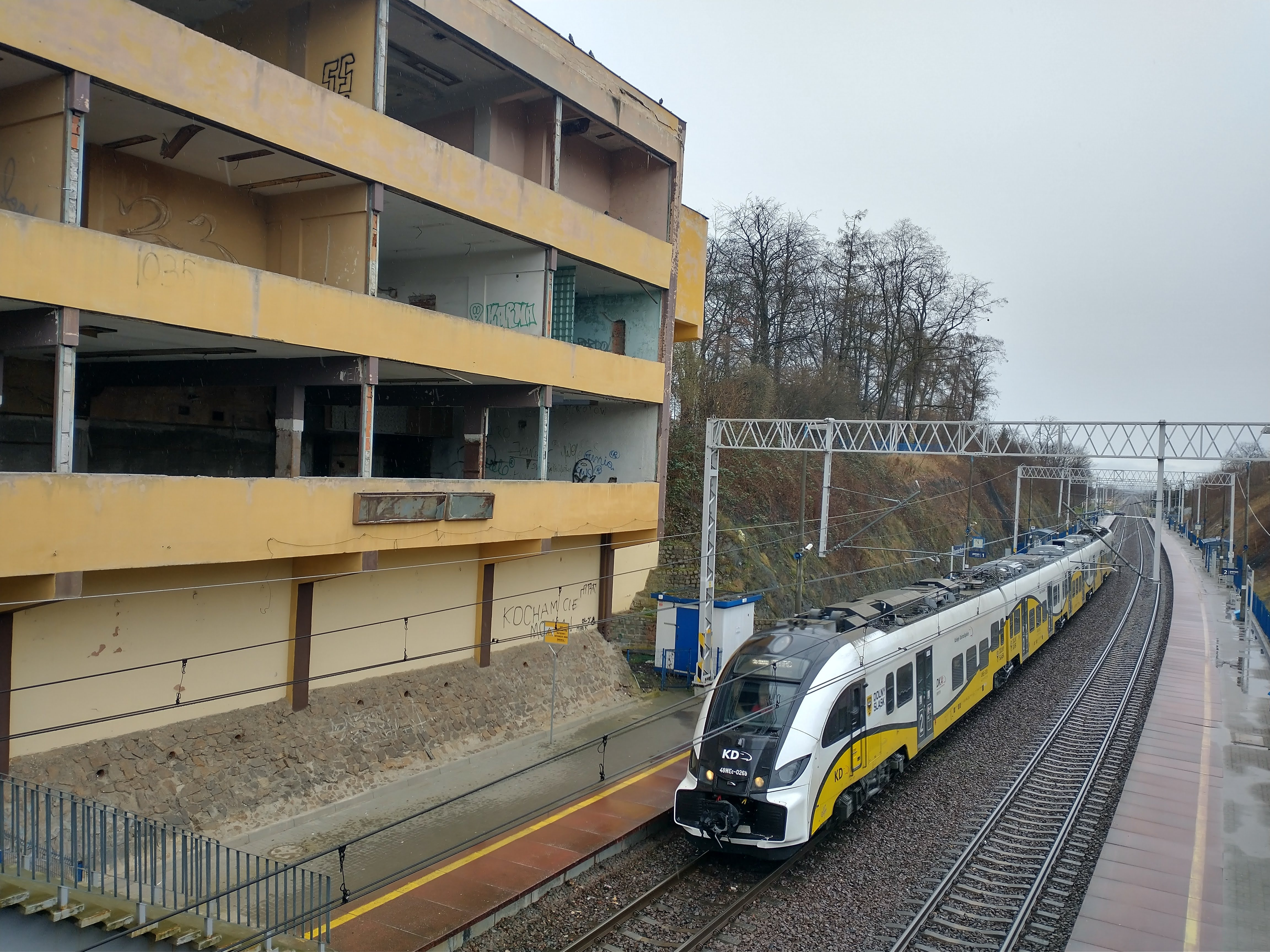
- Platforms and the abandoned station building, before it was demolished

General information
- Location: Juliana Tuwima street, Zgorzelec, Lower Silesian Voivodeship; Poland
- Coordinates: 51.1549°N 15.0201°E
- Owner: Polskie Koleje Państwowe S.A.
- Line: Węgliniec–Görlitz railway
- Platforms: 2
- Tracks: 2

History
- Opened: 1976 (current location)

Services
Preceding station	PKP Intercity	Following station
Pieńsk towards Warszawa Wschodnia	IC	Zgorzelec Terminus
Preceding station	KD	Following station
Jędrzychowice towards Wrocław Główny	D10	Zgorzelec towards Dresden Hauptbahnhof
Preceding station	Polregio	Following station
Jędrzychowice towards Zielona Góra Główna	PR	Zgorzelec towards Görlitz
Location
- Location within Poland Location within Lower Silesian Voivodeship

Zgorzelec Miasto (lit. 'Zgorzelec Town') is a railway station in the town of Zgorzelec, Lower Silesian Voivodeship in south-west Poland. It is one of the two railway stations in the town, the other being Zgorzelec.

== History ==
The station, including the station building, both opened in 1976. Prior to this, Zgorzelec Miasto railway station (which opened in 1945) was located approximately 750 m (2,460 ft) south of the current station, at the junction of the Wrocław Świebodzki–Zgorzelec railway. The station building never received the care it needed, and, was closed in the early 2000s, and left abandoned. Whilst the station building still stood, Zgorzelec Miasto was considered to be one of Poland's ugliest railway stations.

There were many proposals in which the building would be demolished, for the opening of new commercial spaces. For example, in 2018, there was a proposal of a 3,500 m^{2} (38,000 sq ft) shopping centre being built, with new also new station facilities, which would have included a waiting room and ticket hall.

It was only until 2024, when the building was finally demolished. The mayor of Zgorzelec said the owner of the building has an agreement with Polish State Railways on opening commercial spaces on the site of the former building.

== Train services ==
The station is on the served by Lower Silesian Railways, with eleven trains in each direction on weekdays. Additionally, Zgorzelec Miasto station was served by three daily Regional-Express trains running between Wrocław Główny and Dresden Hauptbahnhof from March 2009 until December 2018 (except for a few months in 2015). This service has now been replaced by Lower Silesian Railways, with trains running to Dresden on weekends.

The station is served by the following service(s):

- Intercity services (IC) Zgorzelec - Legnica - Wrocław - Ostrów Wielkopolski - Łódź - Warszawa
- Regional services (KD) Wrocław - Legnica - Zgorzelec - Görlitz
- Regional services (PR) Görlitz - Żary - Zielona Góra

== Gallery ==
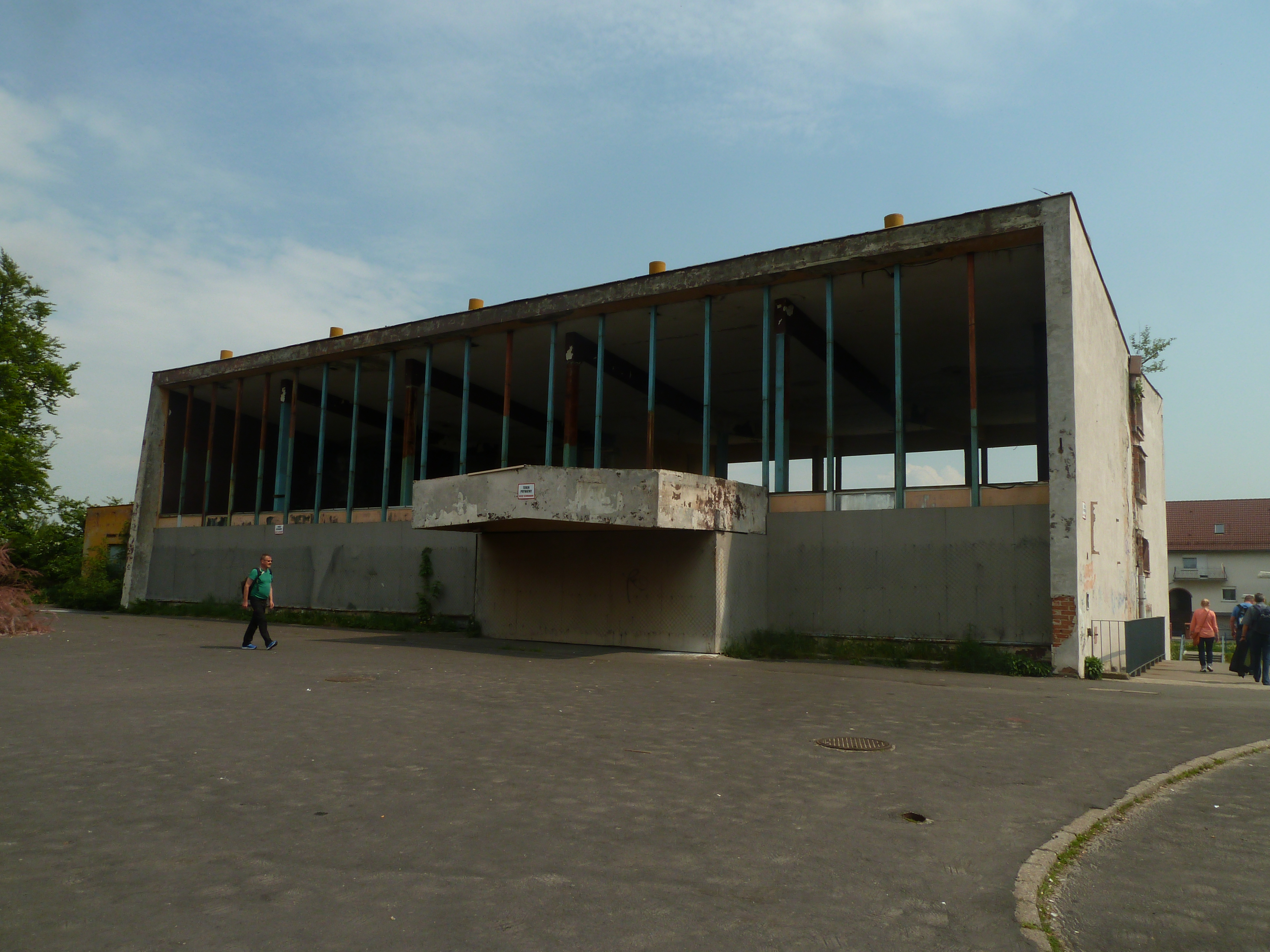
Abandoned station building in 2014, before it was demolished

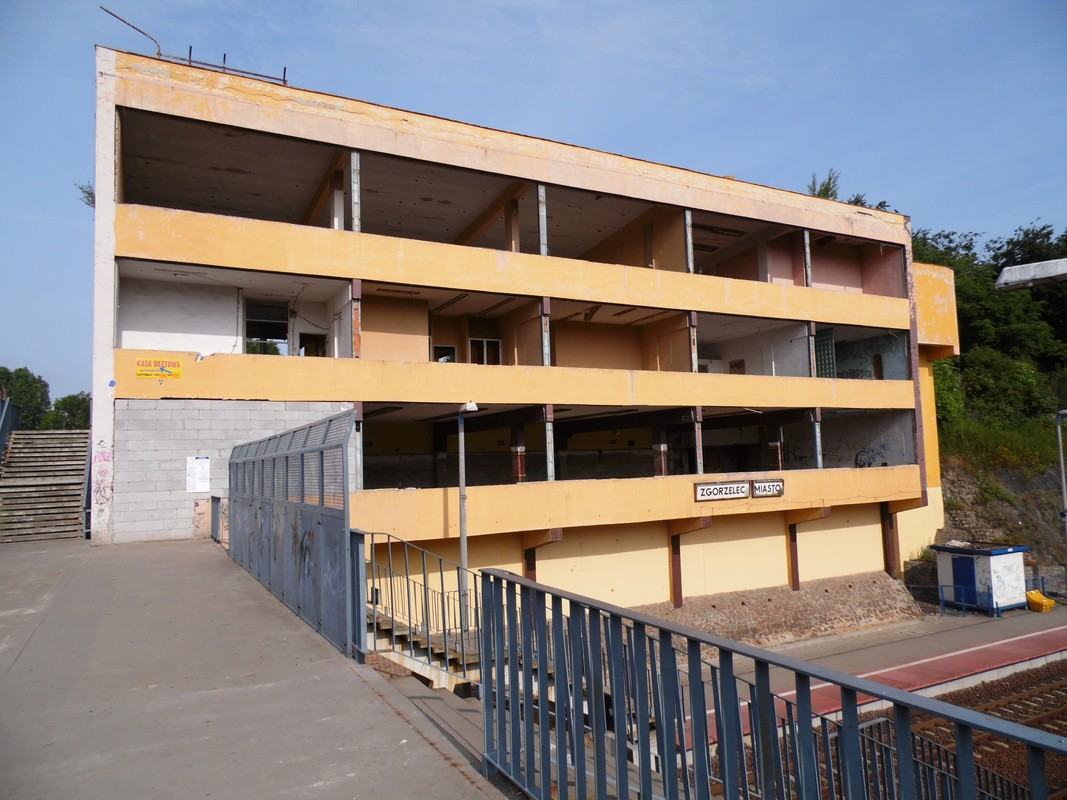

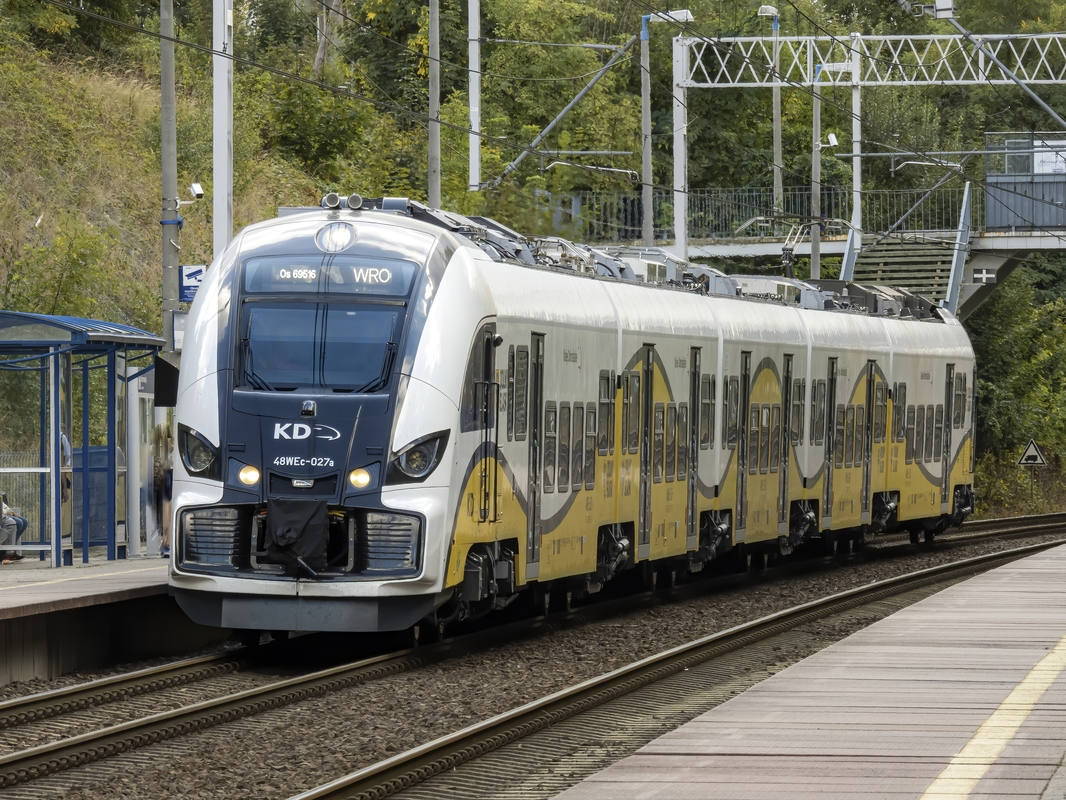
Lower Silesian Railways Pesa 48WEc

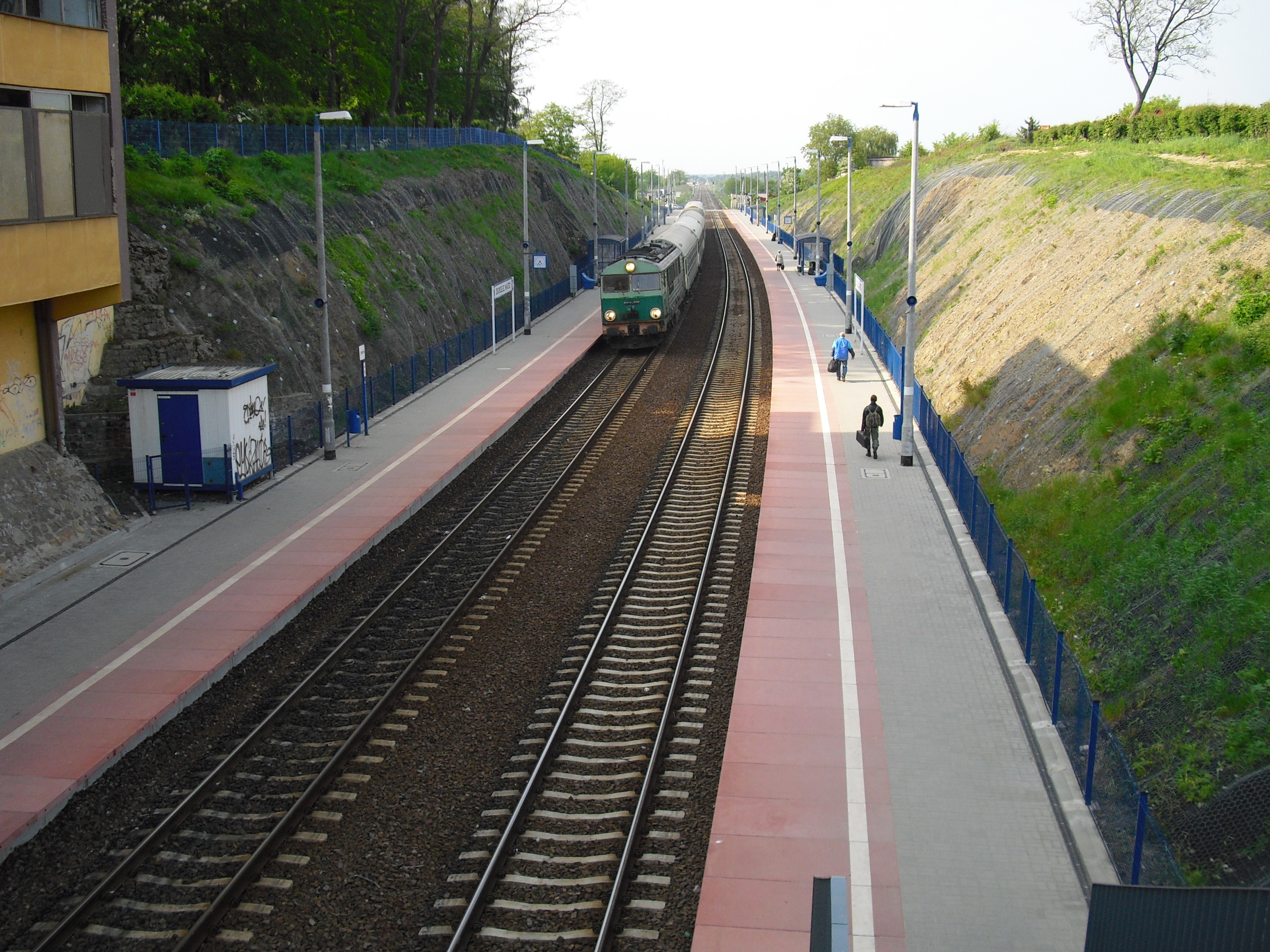
Platforms, before the line was electrified in 2019
