= Hans Karl von Winterfeldt =

Prussian general (1707–1757)

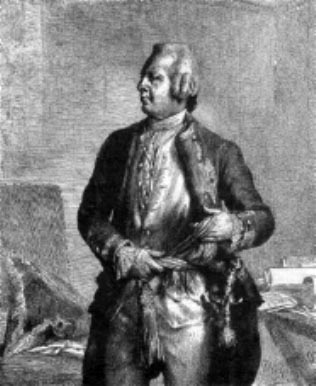
- engraved image of Winterfeld
- Born: 4 April 1707; Siedenbrünzow, Mecklenburg-Vorpommern Swedish Pomerania
- Died: 8 September 1757 (aged 50) Moys, Görlitz
- Allegiance: (Kingdom of Prussia) Prussia
- Rank: General of Infantry
- Conflicts: War of the Polish Succession; War of the Austrian Succession; Seven Years' War
- Awards: Pour le Mérite; Order of the Black Eagle; Name inscribed on Frederick the Great's Equestrian Statue

Hans Karl von Winterfeldt (4 April 1707 – 8 September 1757), a Prussian general, served in the War of the Polish Succession, the War of Austrian Succession, Frederick the Great's Silesian wars and the Seven Years' War. One of Frederick's trusted confidantes and advisors, he attracted enmity from other courtiers. Frederick entrusted him with considerable autonomy on the general staff, and Winterfeldt developed the first "modern" program of military intelligence gathering. He negotiated the Convention of Westminster and, for his efforts on Frederick's behalf, received the Order of the Black Eagle and the Order Pour le Mérite. He died from wounds received at Battle of Moys. His name is included on the Equestrian statue of Frederick the Great. Two significant monuments to his memory can also be found in Berlin.

== Early life ==
Hans Karl von Winterfeldt was born at Vanselow Castle (now in Siedenbrünzow, Mecklenburg-Vorpommern) in Swedish Pomerania. His education was imperfect, and in later life he always regretted his lack of familiarity with the French language.

== Military career ==
Winterfeldt entered the cuirassier regiment of his uncle, Major General von Winterfeld, where he served until 1720; he was promoted cornet after two years service. He was fortunate enough, by his stature and soldierly bearing, to attract the notice of Frederick William I, who transferred him to the so-called giant regiment of grenadiers as a lieutenant. Before long he became a personal aide-de-camp to the king, and in 1732 he was sent with a party of selected non-commissioned officers to assist in the organization of the Russian army.

While the guest of the Count Marshal Munnich at St. Petersburg, Winterfeldt fell in love with, and married, his cousin Julie von Maltzahn, who was also the marshal's stepdaughter and a lady in waiting to the grand duchess Elizabeth of Russia. On returning to Prussia he became an intimate of the crown prince, afterwards Frederick the Great, whom he later accompanied in the Rhine campaign of 1734. This intimacy, in view of his personal relations with the king, made Winterfeldt's position very difficult, for Frederick William and his son were badly estranged over the Katte Affair; eventually the prince was brought before a court-martial by his father, on the charge of attempting to desert, and was condemned to death. Winterfeldt remained the prince's constant friend through all these troubles, and on Frederick II's accession, he was promoted to major and appointed aide-de-camp to the new sovereign.

=== Activities during War of the Austrian Succession ===
When the War of the Austrian Succession started, Winterfeldt was sent on a mission to St. Petersburg, which, however, failed. He then commanded a grenadier battalion with great distinction at the Battle of Mollwitz, and won further glory in the celebrated minor combat of Rothschloss, where the Prussian hussars defeated the Austrians on 17 May 1741. One month later, Winterfeldt was made a colonel, as also was Zieten, the cavalry leader who had actually commanded at Rothschloss; the latter, as the older in years and service, resented the rapid promotion of his junior. After this promotion, Frederick chiefly employed Winterfeldt as a confidential staff officer to represent his views to the generals, a position in which Winterfeldt needed extraordinary tact and knowledge of men and affairs, and as a matter of course made many enemies.

Winterfeldt was the King's confidente in reforming the army, recreating the general staff, and developing military intelligence. In the short peace, he was in constant attendance upon the king, who employed him again, when the war was resumed, in the same capacity as before, and, after he had been instrumental in winning a series of successful minor engagements. was promoted to major general in 1745, with effect from January 1743.

For his great services at Hohenfriedberg, Frederick gave him the captaincy of Tatiau, which carried with it a salary of 500 thalers a year. Later on he became Governor of Kolberg in Pomerania. At the Battle of Hennersdorf, Zieten repulsed the sudden and unexpected assault of the united Austro-Saxon force; Winterfeldt arrived on the field in time to take a decisive part in the victory. Once again the rivals had to share the laurels, and Zieten wrote to the king in disparagement of Winterfeldt, receiving in reply a full and generous recognition of his own worth and services, coupled with the curt remark that the king intended to employ General von Winterfeldt in any way that he thought fit. During the ten years peace that preceded the next great war, Winterfeldt was in constant attendance upon the king, except when employed on confidential missions in the provinces or abroad. For example, he was sent to London for negotiating the Convention of Westminster. In 1756 he was made a lieutenant general and received the Order of the Black Eagle and the Order Pour le Mérite.

== Third Silesian War ==
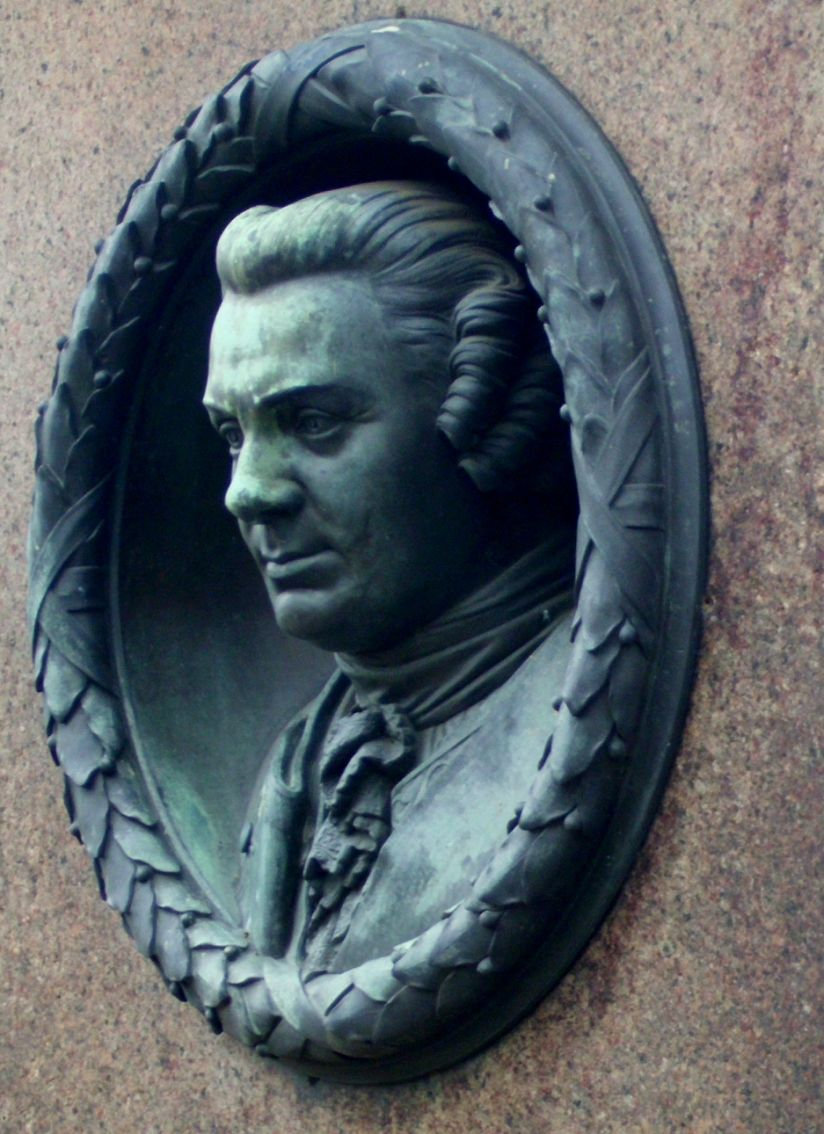
Hans Carl von Winterfeld – Relief at his tomb in the Invalidenfriedhof Berlin

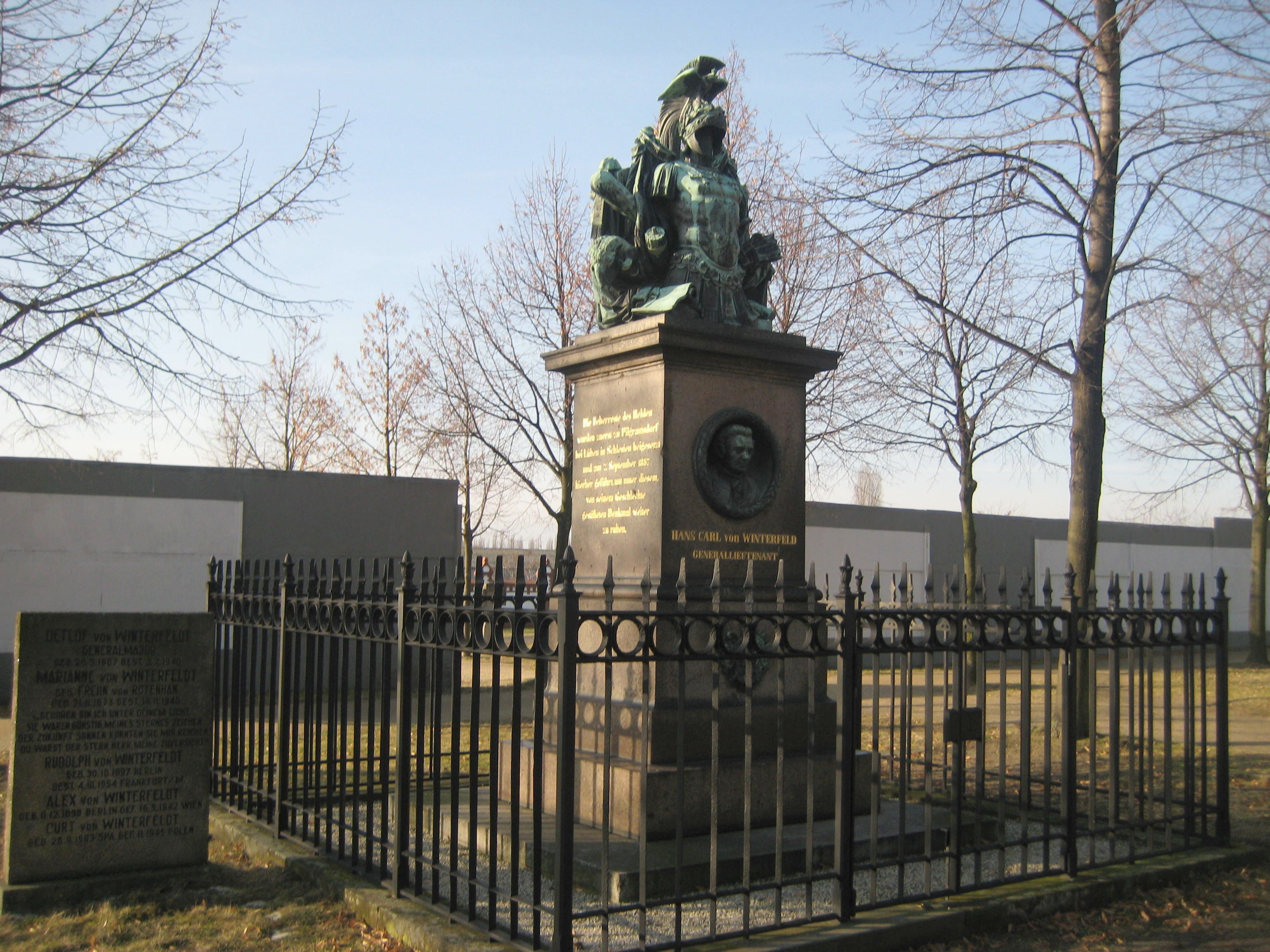
Grave of Hans Karl von Winterfeldt (1757) on the Invalidenfriedhof Berlin

The 1745 Treaty of Dresden, which concluded Prussia's war with Austria, gave Prussia control of Silesia. Frederick understood that Maria Theresa would seek to regain the territory she had lost when she had a chance. Winterfeldt was active in collecting information about the coalition that was secretly preparing to strike Prussia. In preparing for the upcoming war, Winterfeldt took a leading part in the discussions which eventuated in Frederick's decision to strike the first blow.

Winterfeldt was at Pirna with the king; when the Saxons surrendered there, Frederick considered incorporating the Saxon army wholesale into his own, and Winterfeldt advised him against this act. Frederick did it anyway. He accompanied Schwerin in the advance on Prague in 1757 and took a conspicuous part in the battle there, where the Saxon army deserted the Prussians by regiment. After the defeat of Kolin, however, Winterfeldt, whom Frederick seems to have regarded as the only man of character whom he could trust to conduct the more delicate and difficult operations of the retreat, found himself obliged to work in close contact with the king's brother, Prince William, Zieten and others of the men who considered him their enemy.

The operations which followed may be summarized by the phrase everything went wrong; after an angry scene with his brother, Prince William retired from the army, and when Frederick gave Winterfeldt renewed marks of his confidence, the general animosity reached its height. As it chanced, however, Winterfeldt fell a victim to his own bravery in a skirmish at Moys near Görlitz on 7 September. His wound proved fatal and he died on 8 September.

The court enmities provoked by his twenty years unbroken intimacy and influence with the king, and the denigration of less gifted or less fortunate soldiers, followed him in death. Prince William expressed the bitterness of his hatred in almost his last words, and Prince Henry's memoirs give a wholly incredible portrait of Winterfeldt's arrogance, dishonesty, immorality and incapacity. Frederick, however, was not apt to encourage incompetence in his most trusted officers, and as for the rest, Winterfeldt stood first among the very few to whom the king gave his friendship and his entire confidence. On hearing of Winterfeldt's death, he said, "I will never ever find again another Winterfeldt,"and a little later, "He was a good man, a soulful man; he was my friend." Winterfeldt's strength was thinking and acting strategically.

Initially, Winterfeldt was buried at his estate of Barschau; a hundred years later, his body was transferred to the Invalidenfriedhof (military cemetery) at Berlin. A statue, which stands on the Wilhelmplatz there, was erected to his memory, and another was erected in the Bodemuseum on the Museumsinsel. Another forms part of the memorial to Frederick the Great at the boulevard Unter den Linden. In 1851 his name was inscribed on Frederick the Great's Equestrian Statue.

== Bibliography ==
- Denkmal König Friedrichs des Grossen: enthüllt am 31. Mai 1851, Verlag der Deckerschen Geheimen Ober-Hofbuchdruckerei, 1851.
- MacDonogh, Giles. Frederick the Great, a Life in Deed and Letters, St. Martin's Press, 2013. ISBN 978-0-312-27266-1
