= Ujazd, Zgorzelec =

Ujazd
- District of Zgorzelec
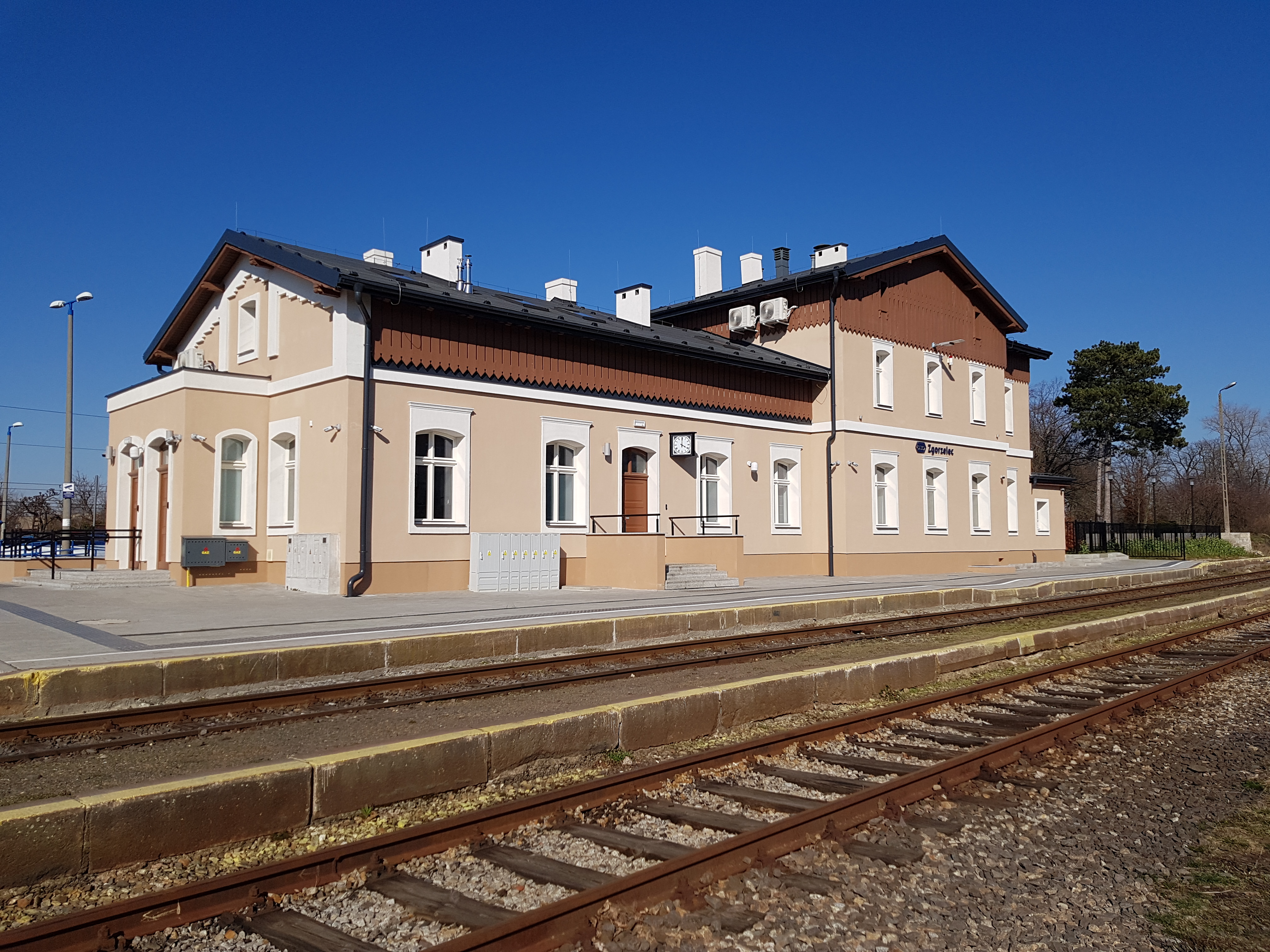
- Zgorzelec railway station

- Location within Poland Location within Lower Silesian Voivodeship
- Coordinates: 51°8′N 15°1′E
- Country: Poland
- Voivodeship: Lower Silesian
- County: Zgorzelec
- Town: Zgorzelec
- First mentioned: 1309
- Within town limits: 1929
- Time zone: UTC+1 (CET)
  - Summer (DST): UTC+2 (CEST)
- Vehicle registration: DZG

Ujazd [ˈujast] (German: Moys, Upper Sorbian: Mojiš, pronounced [ˈmɔjiʃ]) is a district in the town of Zgorzelec, in the Lower Silesian Voivodeship in southwestern Poland. The district is located at the Germany–Poland border, and it straddles the river Czerwona Woda, a tributary of Lusatian Neisse, which defines the state border.

== History ==
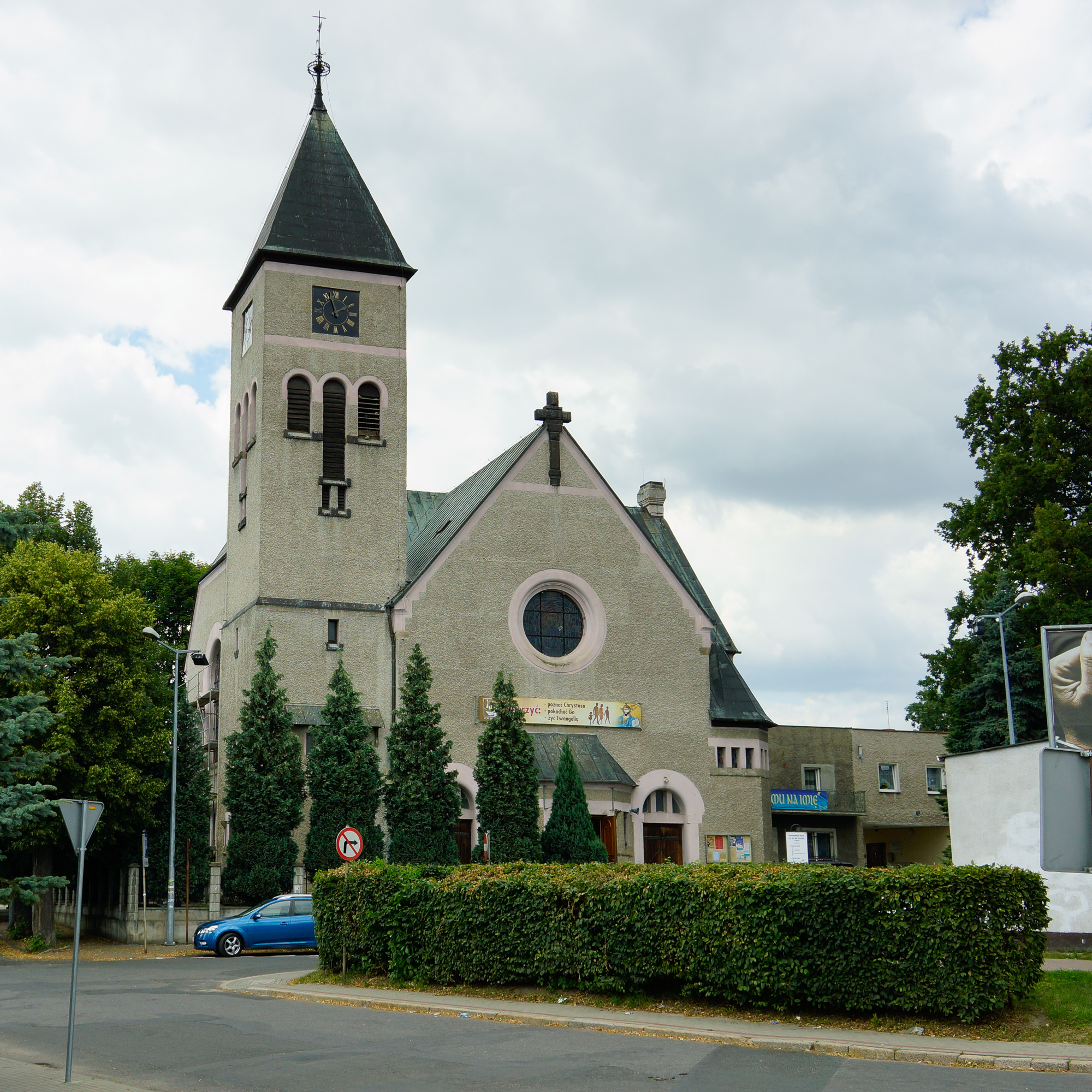
Saint John the Baptist church

The earliest mention of Moys dates back to 1309. Similarly to Zgorzelec/Görlitz, the settlement changed its affiliation many times, being under the rule of Polish dukes from the Piast dynasty, kings of Bohemia, Hungary, electors of Saxony and kings of Poland. Afterwards, at the 1815 Congress of Vienna, Lusatia was divided, and its northeastern part including Görlitz and Moys was awarded to the Kingdom of Prussia, which since 1871 became part of the German Empire.

The city council of Görlitz, then a prosperous city and member of the Lusatian League, had acquired Moys in 1380 from Duke John of Görlitz. The city council had to give up Moys in 1547 as a punishment imposed by Bohemian King Ferdinand I; but none of his feudal lords expressed interest in purchasing Moys, and so in 1549 it was granted back to the city of Görlitz. After the Thirty Years' War brought the city into financial straits, the city council had to sell Moys in 1655 for 11,270 thalers. It wasn't until 1 July 1929 that Moys was incorporated back into the city.

It was the location of the historic battle of Moys on 7 September 1757, during the Seven Years' War.

The Berlin–Wrocław railway, which ran past Moys and opened on 1 September 1847, sped up the development of the suburb. The second line, Silesian Mountain Railway, opened in 1865 and connected Görlitz to Hirschberg (nowadays Jelenia Góra), with the railway junction constructed just north of Moys. This junction was then upgraded to a passenger station (Moys bei Görlitz) which opened in 1876. The urbanisation of Moys was recognised on 18 May 1900 by connecting it to the Görlitz tram network. By the time Moys was incorporated into the city of Görlitz in 1929, it had 2,752 inhabitants and covered 784 ha.

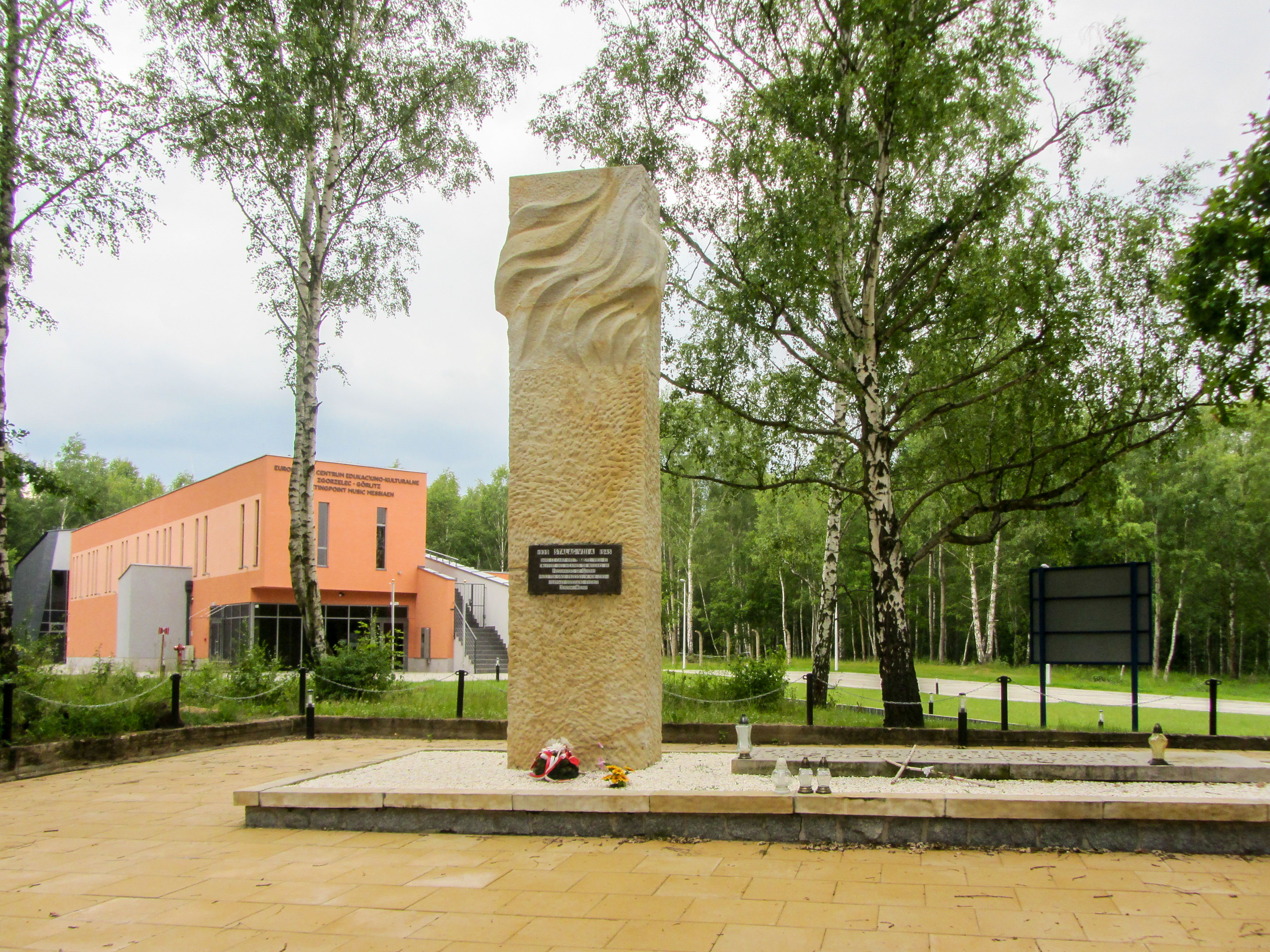
Memorial to the victims of the German Stalag VIII-A POW camp

During World War II, in late 1939, Germany located the large Stalag VIII-A prisoner-of-war camp in the district. Initially Polish prisoners of war were held in the camp. In the first months of the camp's existence, Polish POWs, as forced laborers, built the camp barracks. Later on, also POWs of various other nationalities were held in the camp, including the French, Belgians, Russians, Jews, Britons, Canadians, Australians, New Zealanders, South Africans, Italians, Yugoslavs, Slovaks, Americans. Most POWs were evacuated by the Germans in February 1945 in a death march, during which POWs who either were unable to walk or tried to escape were murdered. Following Nazi Germany's defeat in World War II, Ujazd along with Zgorzelec became part of Poland. In the following decades, the Polish military was stationed in Ujazd.

== Sights ==
The main sights include the Ujazdowski Park, the Saint John the Baptist church, the Baroque palace and the memorial to the victims of the Stalag VIII-A German World War II prisoner of war camp.

== Transport ==
Zgorzelec railway station on the Węgliniec–Zgorzelec railway serves the district.
