= Battle of Moys =

1757 battle

Coordinates: 51°09′08″N 14°59′36″E

- Part of the Third Silesian War (Seven Years' War)
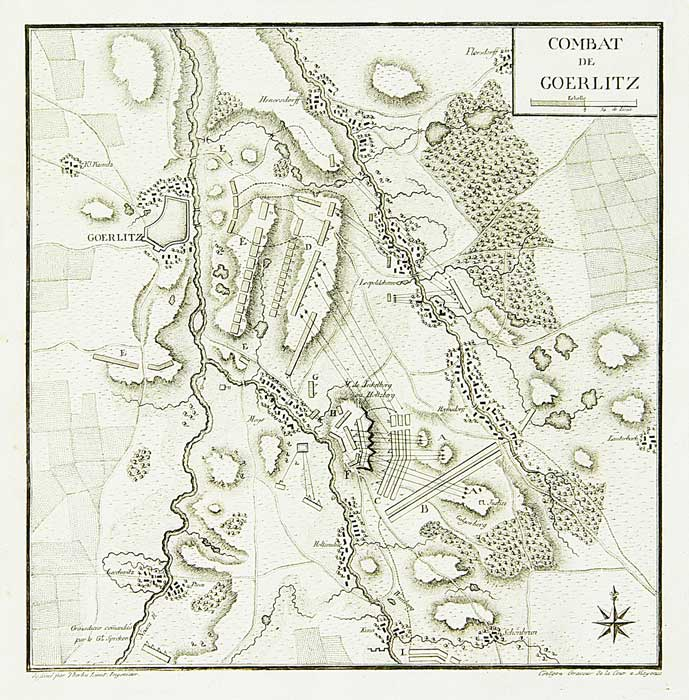
- Map of the battle
Date	7 September 1757
Location	Moys, Upper Lusatia, present-day Poland
Result	Austrian victory

Belligerents
(Kingdom of Prussia) Prussia	(Habsburg monarchy) Austria

Commanders and leaders
Hans Karl von Winterfeldt †	Franz Leopold von Nádasdy

Strength
13,000	26,000

Casualties and losses
1,800	1,500

The Battle of Moys was fought on 7 September 1757 during the Third Silesian War (part of the Seven Years' War). A Prussian Army of 13,000 men fought an Austrian army of double their size. The Prussians were defeated and their commander killed.

The battle was fought near Moys in Upper Lusatia, present-day Ujazd, a district of Zgorzelec in Poland.

== Seven Years' War ==
Although the Seven Years' War was a global conflict, it acquired a specific intensity in the European theater based on the recently concluded War of the Austrian Succession (1741–1748). The 1748 Treaty of Aix-la-Chapelle concluded the earlier war with Austria. Frederick II of Prussia, known as Frederick the Great, acquired the prosperous province of Silesia. Empress Maria Theresa of Austria had signed the treaty to gain time to rebuild her military forces and forge new alliances; she intended to regain ascendancy in the Holy Roman Empire. In 1754, escalating tensions between Britain and France in North America offered the Empress the opportunity to regain her lost territories and to limit Prussia's ever growing power. Similarly, France sought to break the British dominance of Atlantic trade. France and Austria put aside their old rivalry to form a coalition of their own. Britain aligned herself with the Kingdom of Prussia; this alliance drew in not only the British king's territories held in personal union, including Hanover, but also those of his relatives in the Electorate of Brunswick-Lüneburg and the Landgraviate of Hesse-Kassel. This series of political maneuvers became known as the Diplomatic Revolution.

After over-running Saxony, Frederick campaigned in Bohemia and defeated the Austrians on 6 May 1757 at the Battle of Prague; however he was defeated at the Battle of Kolín on the 18th of June and was eventually forced to retreat fully out of Bohemia. With French forces threatening his western flank, Frederick moved to engage them, leaving some 40,000 soldiers to defend Silesia and Lusatia from the Austrians under the command of Augustus William of Brunswick Bevern.

Bevern's duty was to block any Austrian advance on Saxony; he also left Hans Karl von Winterfeldt to "assist" him. Frederick actually trusted Winterfeldt more, as the duke was ageing, however the two did not get along. Bevern felt embarrassed; Winterfeldt felt irked by the constraints imposed.

Bevern became alarmed by the lack of his supplies, and withdrew to Görlitz, leaving Winterfeldt's corps on the opposite side of the Lusatian Neisse river, near Moys.

On the day before the battle, Prince Charles sent Franz Leopold von Nádasdy to the right bank of the river, nearly on Moys, with instructions to take Jäkelsberg (a hill) on the following day. He has 15,000 men, possibly 20,000, and artillery.

== Battle ==
On 7 September, Winterfeldt was absent from his corps, either in consultation with Bevern, or having escorted a meal convoy out of Bautzen: sources disagree. The Austrians launched an attack on the Jäkelsberg but their first assault was repulsed. They then launched a larger attack across the full Prussian line. Winterfeldt quickly arrived with some reinforcements but was soon killed in the fighting. The Austrians managed to take the Jäkelsberg, threatening other Prussian positions and forcing the full Prussian corps to retreat towards Görlitz. During the battle Bevern had ample time to reinforce Winterfeldt but he failed to do so.

== Aftermath ==
Following the battle, the Austrians would advance into Silesia, defeating Bevern at the Battle of Breslau in November.

On 5 November 1757, Frederick defeated the combined French and Austrian force at the Battle of Rossbach. He soon learned that in his absence, the Austrians had managed to take Silesia. Frederick would go on to engage the Austrians at the Battle of Leuthen, in which he won a decisive victory
