= Ludwigsdorf (Görlitz) =

Suburb of Görlitz

Coordinates: 51.1972°N 15°E

Ludwigsdorf Lodowka
- Ortsteil
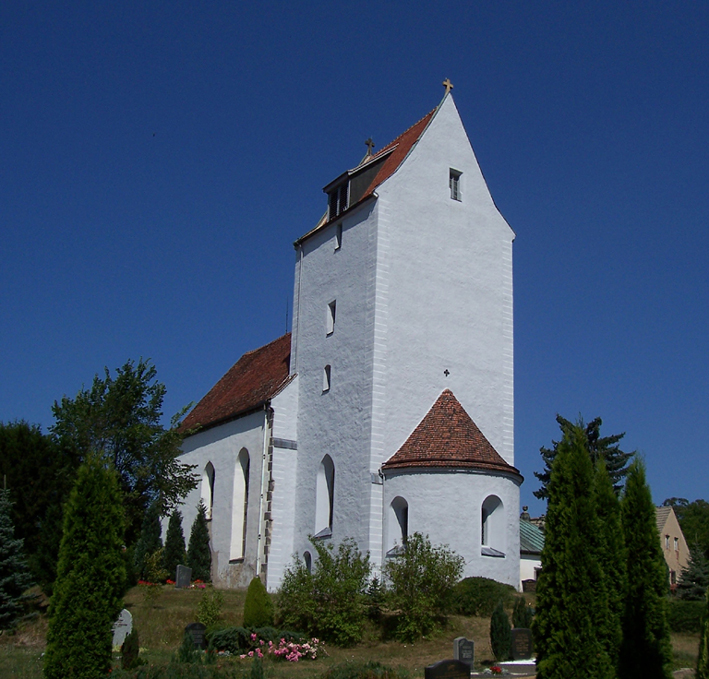
- Choir tower church in Ludwigsdorf (point of view: south east)
- Interactive map of Ludwigsdorf
- Country: Germany
- Freistaat: Saxony
- Landkreis: Görlitz
- Town: Görlitz
- Incorporated: 1 January 1999

Area
  - Total: 9.4 km^{2} (3.6 sq mi)

Population (July 2021)
  - Total: 757
  - Density: 81/km^{2} (210/sq mi)
- Postal code: 02828
- Telephone code: 03581

Ludwigsdorf is a village and a former municipality in Saxony, Germany. It has been part of Görlitz since 1 January 1999. It has 757 inhabitants (July 2021). Together with the village Ober-Neundorf it is the northernmost part of the city.

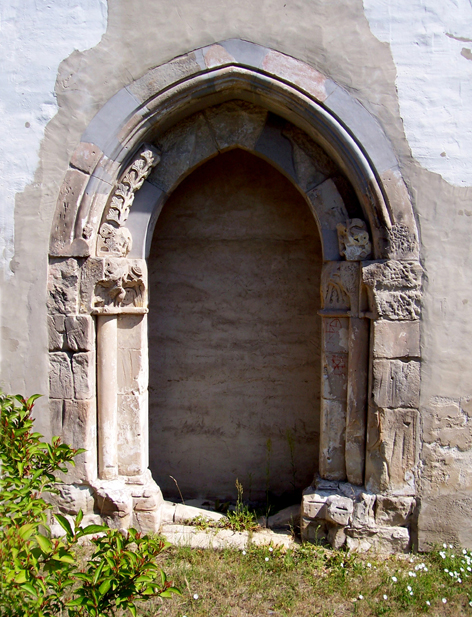
Rediscovered portal from the transition period from the Romanesque to Gothic

There is a customs office Ludwigsdorf at the motorway border crossing.

== Literature ==
- Noky/Oelsner/Frenchkowsky: Dachwerke des 12. Jahrhundert in der OL. Ein Zwischenbericht zu den Untersuchungen an der Kirche zu Ludwigsdorf bei Görlitz. In: Denkmalpflege in Görlitz. 14. 2005, S. 5–12
