= Zgorzelec railway station =

Railway station in Zgorzelec, Poland

Zgorzelec
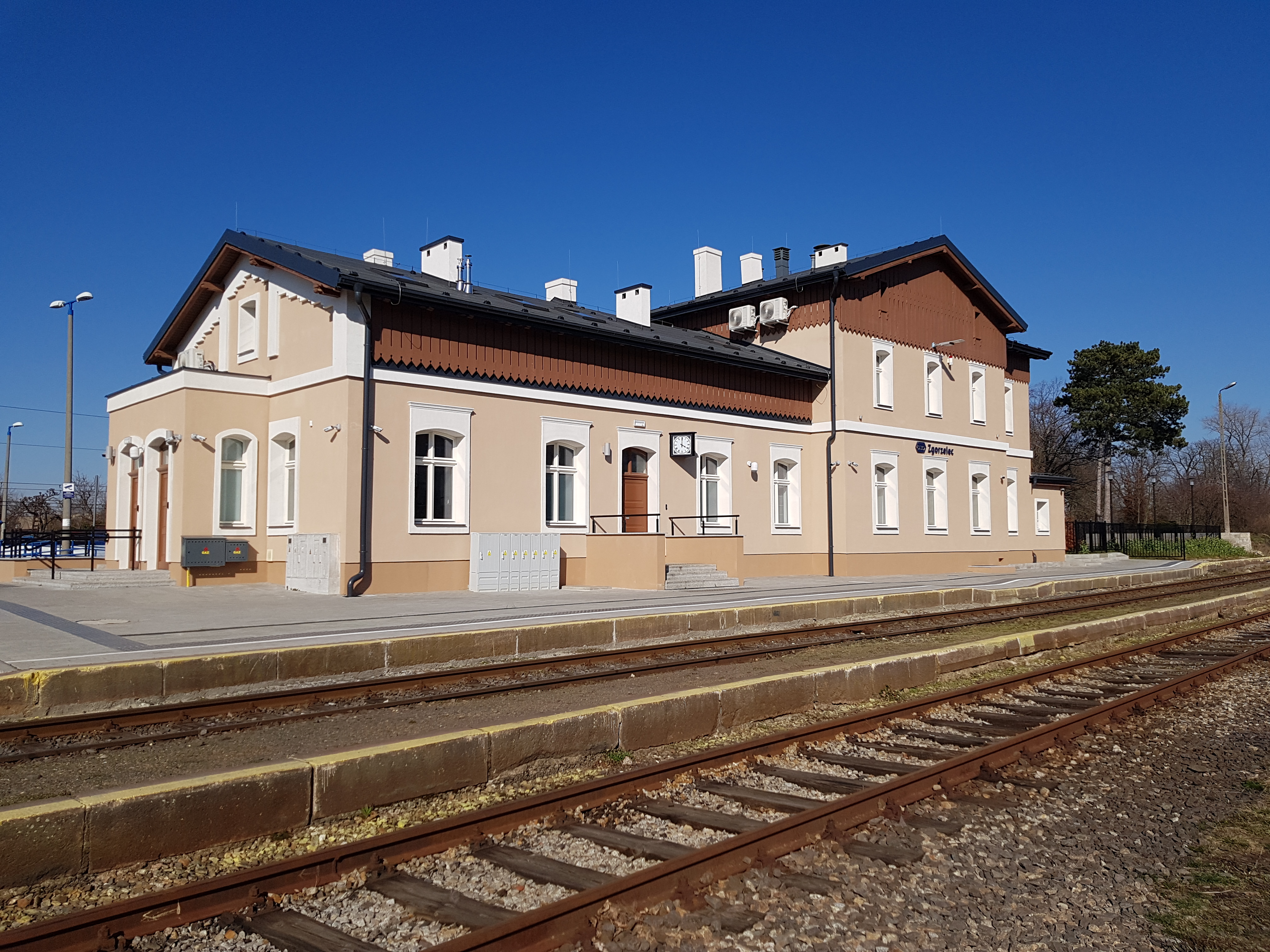

General information
- Location: Ujazd, Zgorzelec, Lower Silesian Voivodeship; Poland
- Coordinates: 51.1402°N 15.0043°E
- Owner: Polskie Koleje Państwowe S.A.
- Lines: Węgliniec–Görlitz railway; Wrocław Świebodzki–Zgorzelec railway
- Platforms: 4
- Tracks: 7

History
- Opened: 1847
- Electrified: 1923–1945; 2019 again
- Former names: Moys bei Görlitz (1876–1933); Görlitz Moys (1933–1945); Zgorzelec Ujazd

Services
Preceding station	PKP Intercity	Following station
Zgorzelec Miasto towards Warszawa Wschodnia	IC	Terminus
Preceding station	KD	Following station
Zgorzelec Miasto towards Wrocław Główny	D10	Görlitz towards Dresden Hauptbahnhof
Jerzmanki towards Świeradów-Zdrój or Karpacz	D62	Görlitz Terminus
Preceding station	Polregio	Following station
Görlitz Terminus	PR	Zgorzelec Miasto towards Zielona Góra Główna
Location
- Location within Poland Location within Lower Silesian Voivodeship

Zgorzelec, sometimes Zgorzelec Ujazd or Ujazd is a railway station in the Ujazd district of Zgorzelec, Lower Silesia, Poland. It is one of the two railway stations in the town, the other being Zgorzelec Miasto. It is the final western station of the Węgliniec–Görlitz railway that is located in Poland.

== History ==
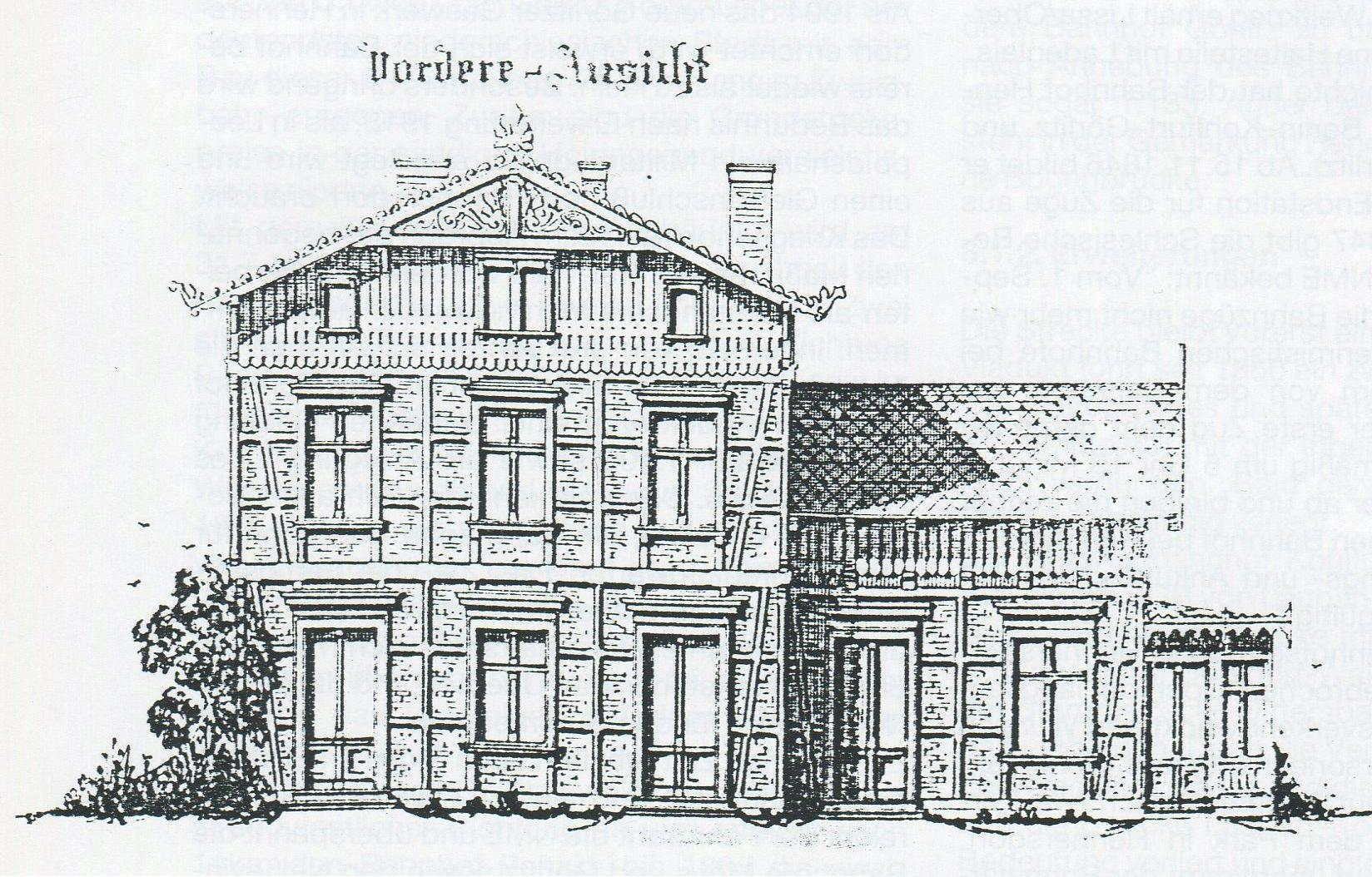
The station building as it opened in 1876

When the branch line of Lower Silesian-Mark Railway Company, operating Berlin–Wrocław railway, from Kohlfurth (nowadays Węgliniec) to Görlitz opened on 1 September 1847, it ran past the village of Moys. The railway junction at Moys was created when the Silesian Mountain Railway from Görlitz to Hirschberg (nowadays Jelenia Góra) was opened in 1865, but the junction didn't have a passenger station to serve the village until 1876.

On 15 December 2019 electrificted railway line 278 Węgliniec – Zgorzelec.

== Train services ==
The station is served by both regional and intercity trains; Lower Silesian Railways, Polregio, and PKP Intercity.

Until mid-December 2014 the station was also served by EuroCity "Wawel", which ran once every day between Berlin Hauptbahnhof and Wrocław Główny. This service was replaced by Lower Silesian Railways weekend-only service from Wrocław Główny to Berlin Lichtenberg/Ostkreuz via Węgliniec.

The station is served by the following service(s):

- Intercity services (IC) Zgorzelec – Legnica – Wrocław – Ostrów Wielkopolski – Łódź – Warszawa
- Regional services (KD) Wrocław - Legnica - Zgorzelec - Görlitz
- Regional services (KD) Karpacz / Świeradów-Zdrój - Gryfów Śląski - Görlitz
- Regional services (R) Görlitz - Żary - Zielona Góra
