= Węgliniec–Görlitz railway =

Railway line in Poland and Germany

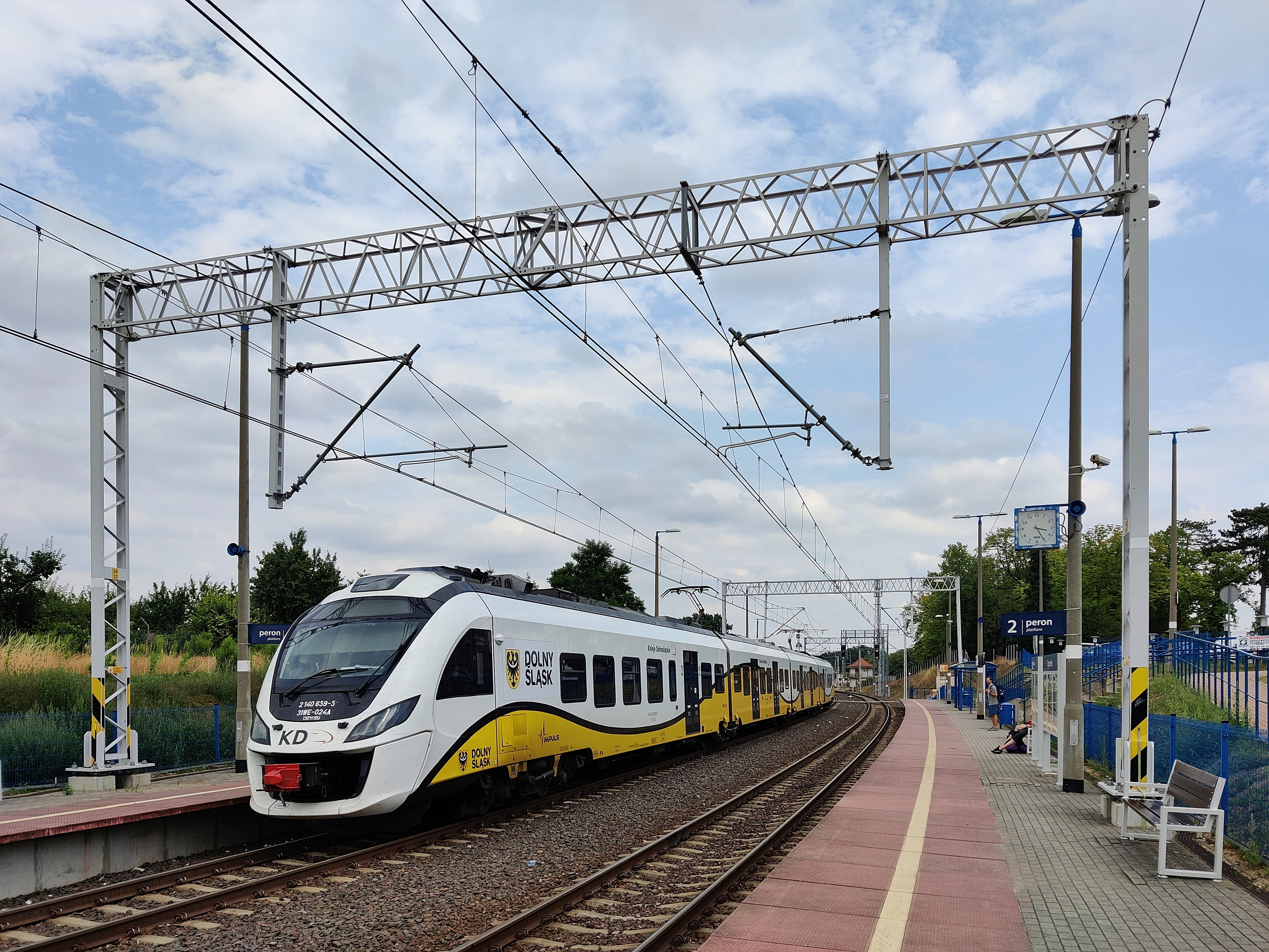
- An electric multiple unit of Lower Silesian Railways train at Zgorzelec railway station

Overview
- Line number: PKP 278
- Locale: Lower Silesian Voivodeship, Poland; Saxony, Germany
- Termini: Węgliniec; Görlitz

Service
- Route number: Węgliniec–border: PLK 260; border–Görlitz: DB 6211

Technical
- Line length: 26.532 km (16.486 mi)
- Number of tracks: 2
- Track gauge: 1,435 mm (4 ft 8 1/2 in) standard gauge
- Electrification: 1923–1945, between Zgorzelec and Görlitz; from 2020: whole line
- Operating speed: maximum speed: 160 km/h (99.4 mph)
Route map
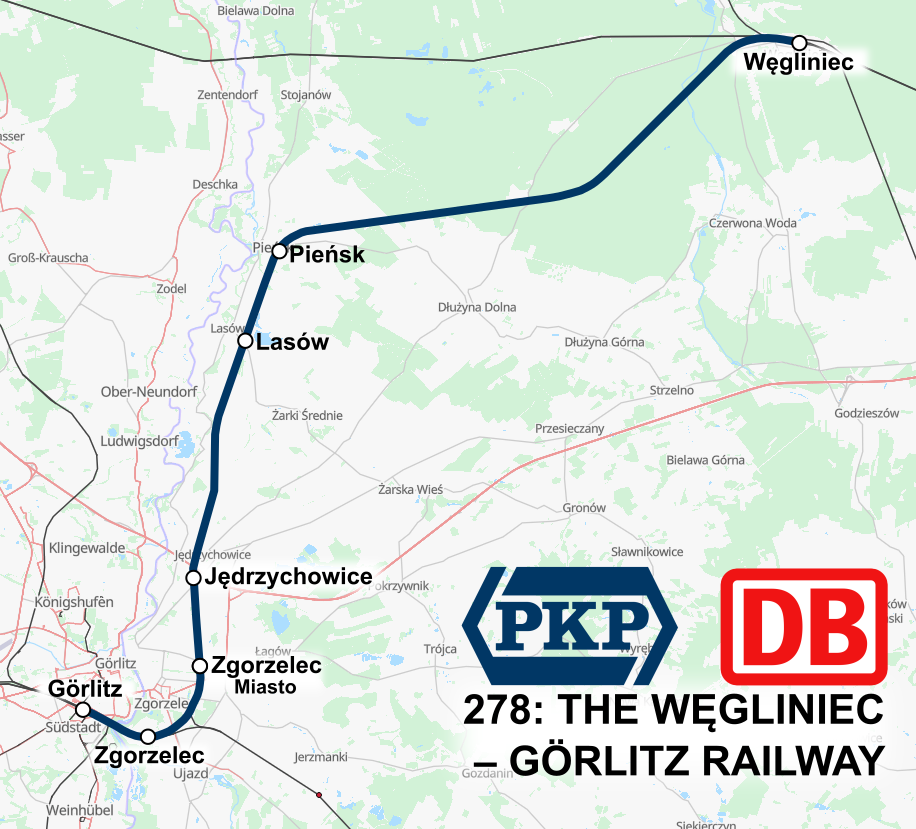

The Węgliniec–Görlitz railway is a double-track railway line connecting Węgliniec railway station in Węgliniec and Zgorzelec railway station in Zgorzelec, in the Lower Silesian Voivodeship of south-west Poland, and continuing to Görlitz in German state of Saxony.

Except for the final kilometre between the border and Görlitz station, the line is operated by PKP Polskie Linie Kolejowe as line 278, with the border bridge across the Nysa Łużycka river belonging to line 274 (Wrocław Świebodzki – Zgorzelec). The corresponding timetable (SRJP) route has no. 260.

== History ==
The construction of the railway line started on 31 July 1845 when the station was built in Węgliniec (at the time under the German name Kohlfurt), attracting a large number of railway employees into what used to be a small village. A single-track railway line was finished by 26 August 1847, and on 1 September, the opening ceremonies were held. The purpose of the line was to connect the Berlin–Wrocław railway with the Görlitz–Dresden railway, and the latter was formally opened on the same day, 1 September 1847. Later in the 1860s, the Silesian Mountain Railway was built, branching off at Zgorzelec (Moys bei Görlitz) via Wałbrzych (Waldenburg-Dittersbach) to Wrocław (Breslau); in the same decade, the Węgliniec–Görlitz railway was converted to double-track.

In 1860s and 1870s, the village of Węgliniec evolved into a major railway hub: the branch line to Lubań (Lauban) on the Silesian Mountain Railway opened in 1865, and the Węgliniec–Roßlau railway reached Węgliniec in 1874. At this time, railway employees made up the majority of the village's population.

The 2 km long section between Zgorzelec and Görlitz station was electrified in 1923, with the electric traction in operation since 1 September 1923. The overhead lines were badly damaged in February 1945.

In 1948, Polish State Railways constructed a bypass to allow traffic between Węgliniec and Lubań without having to reverse at Zgorzelec railway station. At this time, the new Zgorzelec Miasto railway station was built, so that the trains using the bypass could still serve the town of Zgorzelec.

On 24 November 2017, the Polish infrastructure operator PKP PLK signed a contract for the electrification of the Węgliniec–Zgorzelec railway. The work was completed by 2020, at the cost of around 70 million zlotys (16.3 million euros), out of which, 85% are financed by the EU infrastructure fund.

== Train services ==
Since 2009, with an interruption between February and December 2015, three daily Regional-Express trains run on the Węgliniec–Görlitz railway, on service between Wrocław Główny railway station and Dresden Hauptbahnhof. Additionally, Lower Silesian Railways run eleven weekday trains between Węgliniec and Zgorzelec in each direction, as well as two daily trains between Węgliniec and Lubań, through Zgorzelec Miasto bypassing the Zgorzelec railway station.
