= Zgorzelec Nadleśnictwo railway station =

Former railway station in Węgliniec, Poland

Zgorzelec Nadleśnictwo Zgorzelec Forestry
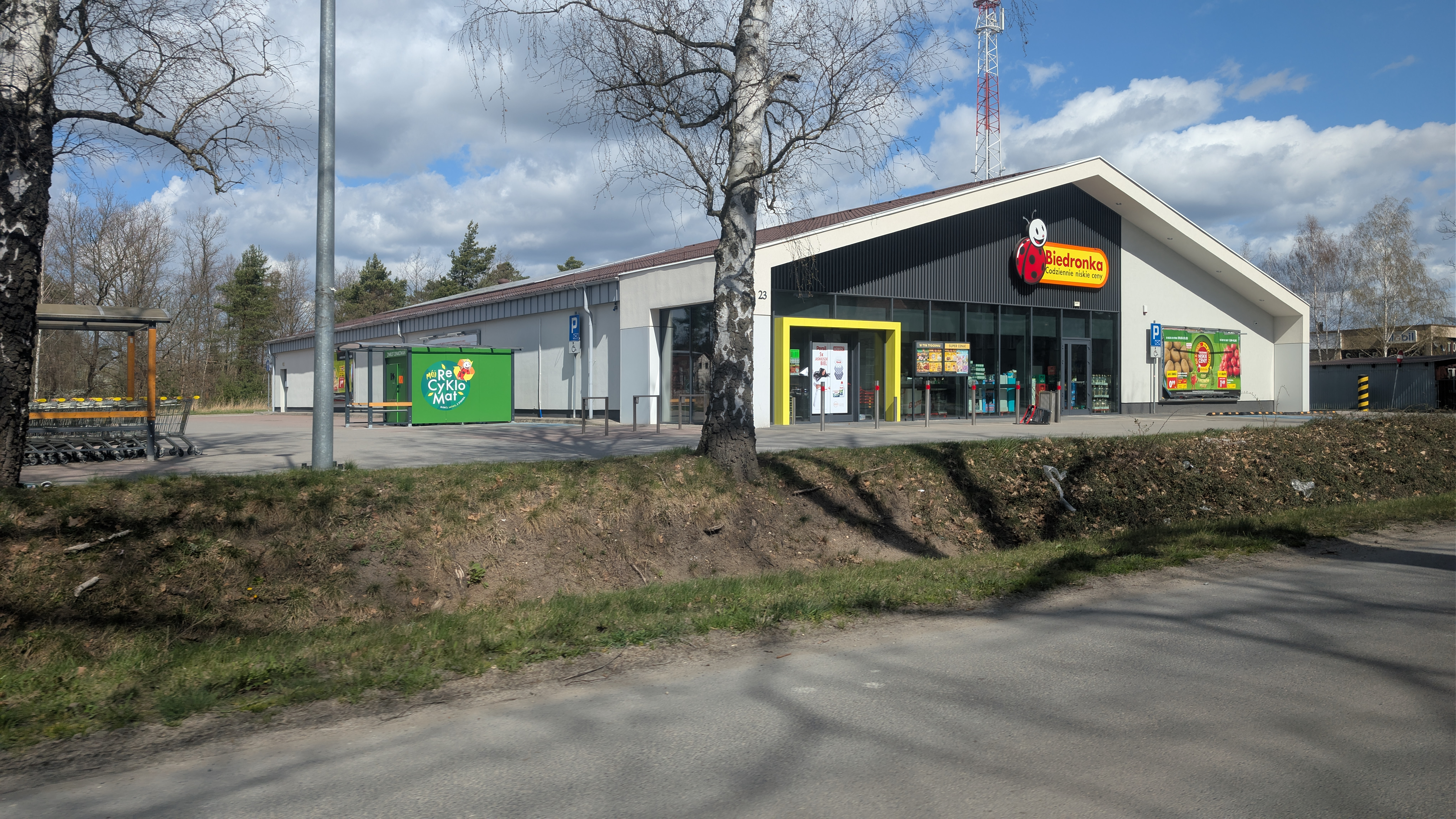
- A Biedronka supermarket stands at the site of the former station, pictured in 2026

General information
- Location: Węgliniec, Lower Silesian Voivodeship; Poland
- Coordinates: 51°17′21.2″N 15°12′23.9″E
- Owner: Polish State Railways
- Line: Węgliniec–Czerwona Woda railway
- Platforms: 1

History
- Opened: 22 October 1913
- Closed: 22 May 1954
- Former names: Forst Görlitz (before 1945); Zgorzelec Gaj (1945–1947)
Location
- Location within Poland Location within Lower Silesian Voivodeship

Zgorzelec Nadleśnictwo (lit. 'Zgorzelec Forestry'; German: Forst Görlitz) was a railway station on the Węgliniec–Czerwona Woda railway in the town of Węgliniec, Zgorzelec County, within the Lower Silesian Voivodeship in south-western Poland.

Passenger services were withdrawn on 22 May 1954. The station continued serve as a loading bay for freight trains until its full closure in 1959. During its time, it primarily served as a loading bay with no station building.

== History ==
The station was opened by the Kohlfurt–Rothwasser Light Railway Company as Kolfurt Kleinbahnhof on 22 October 1913, serving the nearby forestry, with a loading bay, primarily used to transport timber.

After World War II, the area came under Polish administration. As a result, the station was taken over by Polish State Railways, and was renamed to Zgorzelec Gaj (which was later renamed to Zgorzelec Nadleśnictwo in 1947).

Passenger services continued until their withdrawal on 22 May 1954. The station was converted to a siding, used as a fuel depot, and still a loading bay for local goods, usually timber. The station was officially closed in 1959. The whole line was later dismantled in 1974. Any remaining station infrastructure was also demolished.

== Former services ==
Preceding station	Disused railways	Following station
Węgliniec Dworzec Mały towards Węgliniec	Polish State Railways; Węgliniec–Czerwona Woda	Czerwona Woda Północna towards Czerwona Woda
