= Whiteway =

Whiteway may refer to:

== Places ==
=== In Canada ===
- Whiteway, Newfoundland and Labrador

=== In England ===
- Whiteway, Dorset, in East Lulworth parish
- Whiteway (hundred), Dorset
- Whiteway Colony, Gloucestershire
- Whiteway, Bath, Somerset, a housing estate
- Whiteway, Kingsteignton, a historic estate in Devon
- Whiteway House, Chudleigh, a historic estate in Devon

== People ==
- Whiteway (surname)

== See also ==
- Goldway (disambiguation)
- Greenway (disambiguation)
- Redway (disambiguation)
- Yelloway
