= Czerwona Woda =

Czerwona Woda may refer to the following:

- Czerwona Woda, Lower Silesian Voivodeship (south-west Poland)
- Czerwona Woda, Iława County in Warmian-Masurian Voivodeship (north Poland)
- Czerwona Woda, Olsztyn County in Warmian-Masurian Voivodeship (north Poland)
- Czerwona Woda railway station, Lower Silesian Voivodeship
- Czerwona Woda Północna railway station, Lower Silesian Voivodeship
