= Redway =

Redway may refer to:

- Redway (surname)
- Redway, California, United States, a census-designated place located in Humboldt County
- Redways, a network of shared-use paths in Milton Keynes, England
- Red Way, an airline based in Lincoln, NE, United States

== See also ==
- Redway School (disambiguation)
- Redwater (disambiguation)
