= Węgliniec–Czerwona Woda railway =

Former railway line in south-western Poland

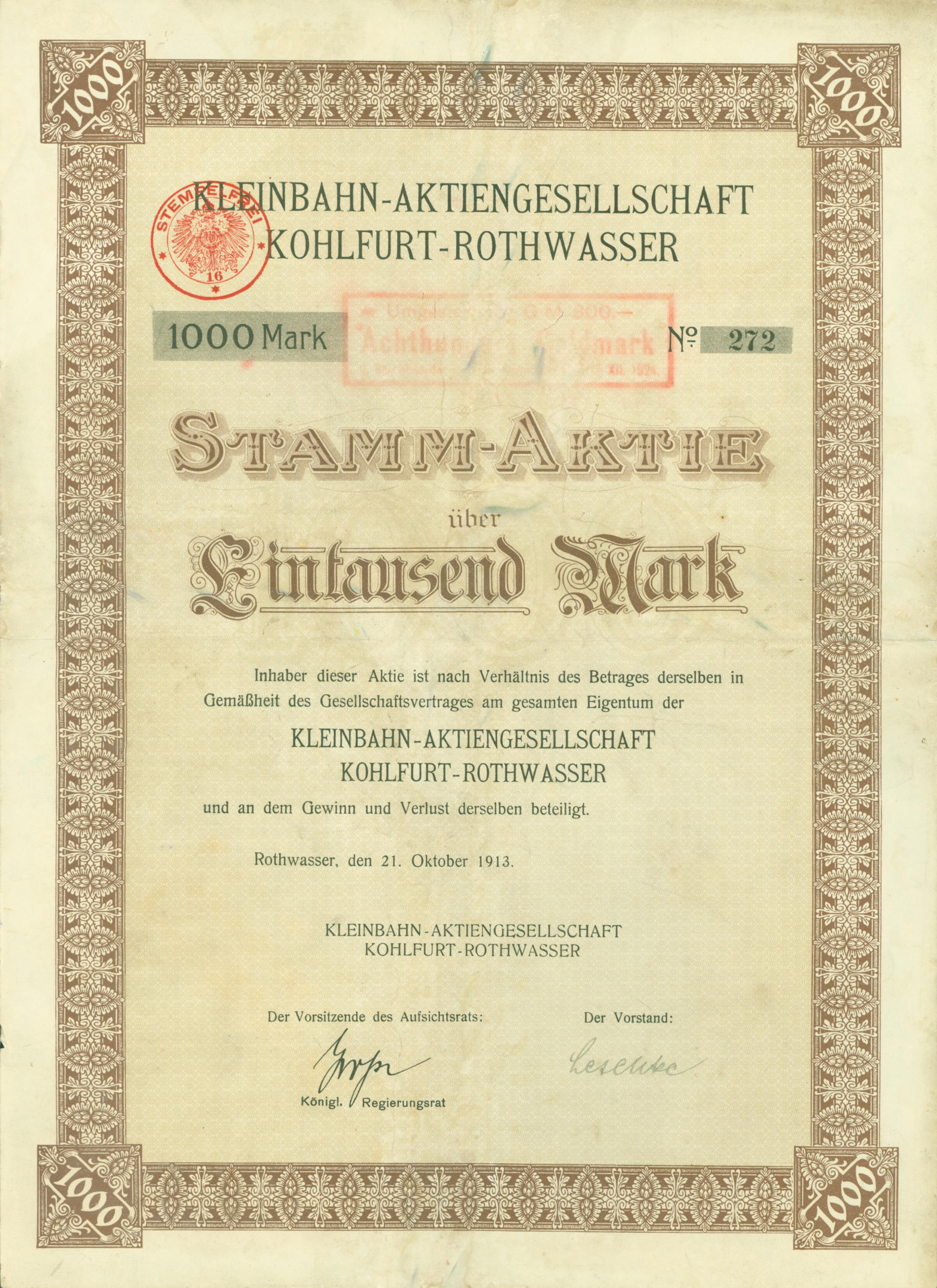
- Share certificate for 1,000 marks of the Kohlfurt-Rothwasser Light Railway Company (1913)

Overview
- Status: Dismantled
- Line number: PKP 278a
- Locale: Lower Silesian Voivodeship, Poland
- Termini: Węgliniec; Węgliniec Dworzec Mały (before 1945); Czerwona Woda

History
- Opened: 22 October 1913
- Closed: 27 May 1967

Technical
- Line length: 6.42 km (3.99 mi)
- Number of tracks: 1
- Track gauge: 1,435 mm (4 ft 8 1/2 in) standard gauge
- Operating speed: 30 km/h (19 mph)

The Węgliniec–Czerwona Woda railway was a single-track unelectrified light railway line which connected Węgliniec railway station (Węgliniec Dworzec Mały prior to 1945) in Węgliniec and Czerwona Woda railway station in Czerwona Woda in the Lower Silesian Voivodeship of south-western Poland.

After previous proposals (earliest in 1904), the line opened on 22 October 1913. Passenger services were withdrawn on 27 May 1967, with freight trains using the line until it was dismantled on 17 May 1974.

== History ==
The first railway constructed in the area was in Węgliniec, in 1846. Services ran to Wrocław, and Görlitz/Zgorzelec. However, the village of Czerwona Woda opposed the proposal of a railway line connecting it with Węgliniec. It was only after the neighbouring town of Pieńsk experienced an economic boom due to its opening of Pieńsk railway station that Czerwona Woda also began to desire a railway connection.

The first proposal to construct a railway line to Czerwona Woda was in 1904, which would have been a narrow-gauge railway to Sulików, also via Jerzmanki. However, this proposal was cancelled. A standard-gauge railway was preferred, therefore, on 17 May 1913, the Kohlfurt–Rothwasser Light Railway Company was established. Planning had taken place since at least 1911, with a standard-gauge railway line being built between Węgliniec and Czerwona Woda under the Prussian Light Railways Act.

A new smaller station, Kolfurt Kleinbahnhof lit. 'Węgliniec little station' was built as the terminus in Węgliniec to ease rail traffic in the existing Węgliniec railway station. Despite this, the line still had a connection to the main station. The terminus of Czerwona Woda was designed in a way the line could be easily extended to Jerzmanki and Sulików, following the cancelled 1904 proposal. However, due to the outbreak of World War I, the line was never extended.

The line officially opened to passengers on 21 October 1913, making it the final extension from Węgliniec railway station. Six pairs of trains ran daily in 1914, but this was reduced to just two trains daily by the 1930s. The line however was still heavily used by freight trains, with still several sidings in operation.

After World War II, the area was placed under Polish administration as the Oder–Neisse line became the new main border between Germany and Poland. As a result, the line was taken over by Polish State Railways. Despite poor conditions, passenger services were resumed, with Zgorzelec Nadleśnictwo railway station closing for freight trains only in 1953. Węgliniec Dworzec Mały also closed in 1945, with services then terminating at Węgliniec railway station. The rest of the line closed on 27 May 1967. At this point, the line was rarely used by freight trains, until it was finally dismantled on 17 May 1974.

In 2018, a 3.5 km (2.2 mi) bicycle path on the route of the former line was opened by Gmina Węgliniec. A 4.5 km (2.8 mi) water and 3.7 km (2.3 mi) sewage pipeline were also completed along the former route, connecting Węgliniec and Czerwona Woda. A pumping station also opened on the site of the former Czerwona Woda Północna railway station.

== Rolling stock (pre World War II) ==
At the start of operations, the rolling stock consisted of two Maffei Bn2t type locomotives, built in 1913. These were sold in 1935 and replaced with two Cn2t type locomotives from the Bunzlau Light Railway. Unit no. 22 had been built by LHW in 1905, and the other, no. 21, by Orenstein & Koppel in 1913. The latter was transferred to the Oderbruch Railway in 1945, later taken over by the Deutsche Reichsbahn as locomotive 89 6129, which was finally retired in 1965.
