= Węgliniec Dworzec Mały railway station =

Former railway station in Węgliniec, Poland

Węgliniec Dworzec Mały Węgliniec Little Station
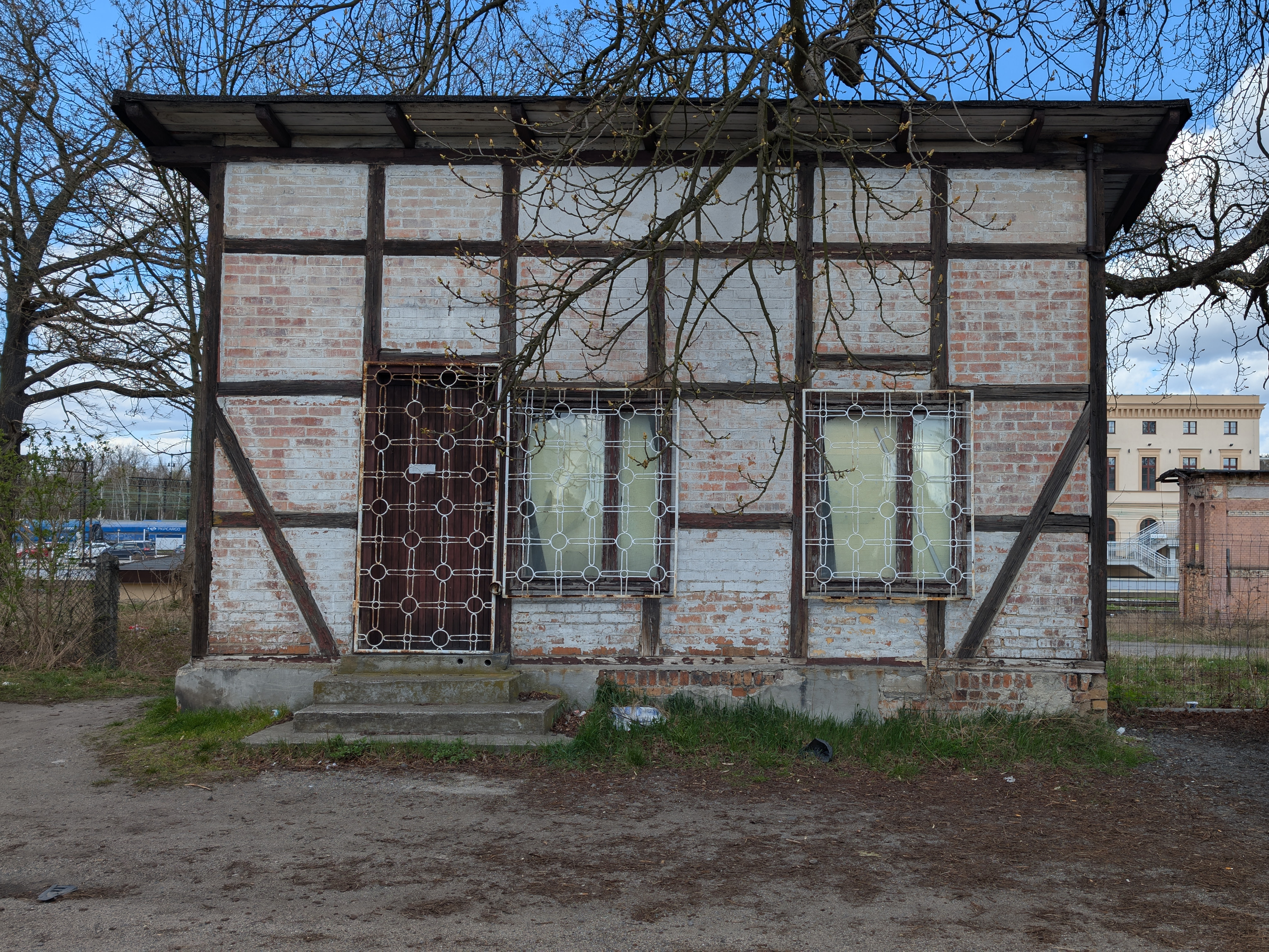
- Abandoned station building in 2026

General information
- Location: Węgliniec, Lower Silesian Voivodeship; Poland
- Coordinates: 51°17′21.1″N 15°13′20.0″E
- Owner: Polish State Railways
- Line: Węgliniec–Czerwona Woda railway
- Platforms: 1

History
- Opened: 22 October 1913
- Closed: 1945
- Former names: Kolfurt Kleinbahnhof (before 1945)
Location
- Location within Poland Location within Lower Silesian Voivodeship

Węgliniec Dworzec Mały (lit. 'Węgliniec Little Station'; German: Kolfurt Kleinbahnhof) was a railway station on the Węgliniec–Czerwona Woda railway in the town of Węgliniec, Zgorzelec County, within the Lower Silesian Voivodeship in south-western Poland.

The station closed in 1945 as the new terminus of the Węgliniec–Czerwona Woda railway became Węgliniec railway station. The line later closed for passenger services on 27 May 1967. Tracks were dismantled in 1974.

== History ==
The station was opened by the Kohlfurt–Rothwasser Light Railway Company as Kolfurt Kleinbahnhof on 22 October 1913, serving as the terminus of the Węgliniec–Czerwona Woda railway. The station was located just 50 m (160 ft) to the footbridge entrance of the existing Węgliniec railway station.

After World War II, the area came under Polish administration. As a result, the station was taken over by Polish State Railways, and was renamed to Węgliniec Dworzec Mały. The same year, in 1945, the station closed, with the new terminus of the line becoming Węgliniec railway station.

After the Węgliniec–Czerwona Woda railway was closed in 1967, tracks around the station were dismantled in 1974. The station building was not demolished, and instead became a clothing store, which was later closed. The station building still stands today.

== Former services ==
Preceding station	Disused railways	Following station
Węgliniec	Polish State Railways; Węgliniec–Czerwona Woda	Zgorzelec Nadleśnictwo
