= Czerwona Woda Północna railway station =

Former railway station in Czerwona Woda, Poland

Czerwona Woda Północna Czerwona Woda North
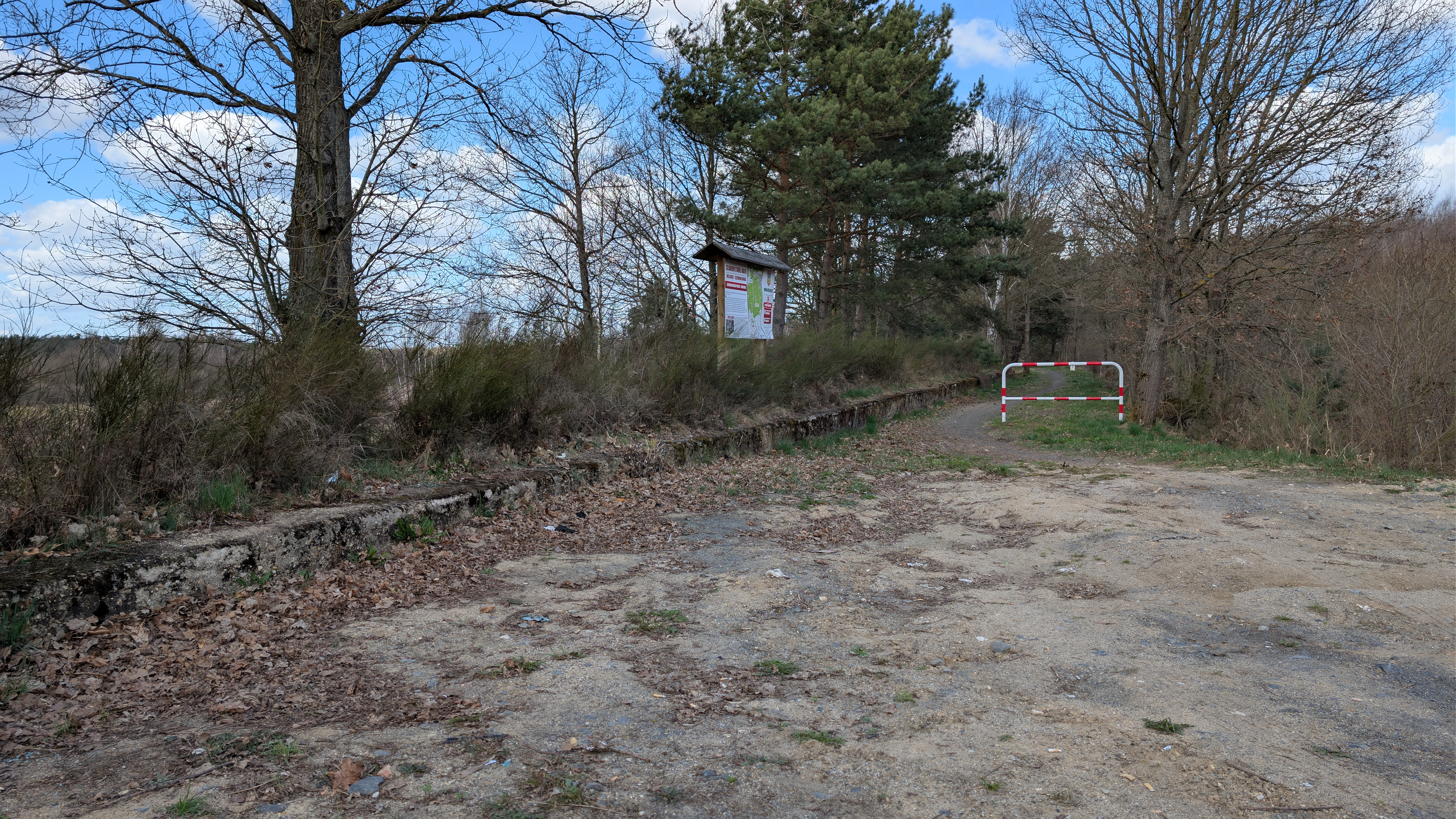
- Abandoned platform in 2026, view towards Węgliniec

General information
- Location: Czerwona Woda, Lower Silesian Voivodeship; Poland
- Owner: Polish State Railways
- Line: Węgliniec–Czerwona Woda railway
- Platforms: 1

History
- Opened: 22 October 1913
- Closed: 27 May 1967
- Former names: Rothwasser Niederbahnhof (1913–1914); Rothwasser (Ober/Lausitz) Niederbahnhof (1914–1931); Czerwona Woda Dworzec Północny (1945–1947)
Location
- Location within Poland Location within Lower Silesian Voivodeship

Czerwona Woda Północna (lit. 'Czerwona Woda North'; German: Rothwasser Niederbahnhof) was a railway station on the Węgliniec–Czerwona Woda railway near the village of Czerwona Woda, Zgorzelec County, within the Lower Silesian Voivodeship in south-western Poland.

== History ==
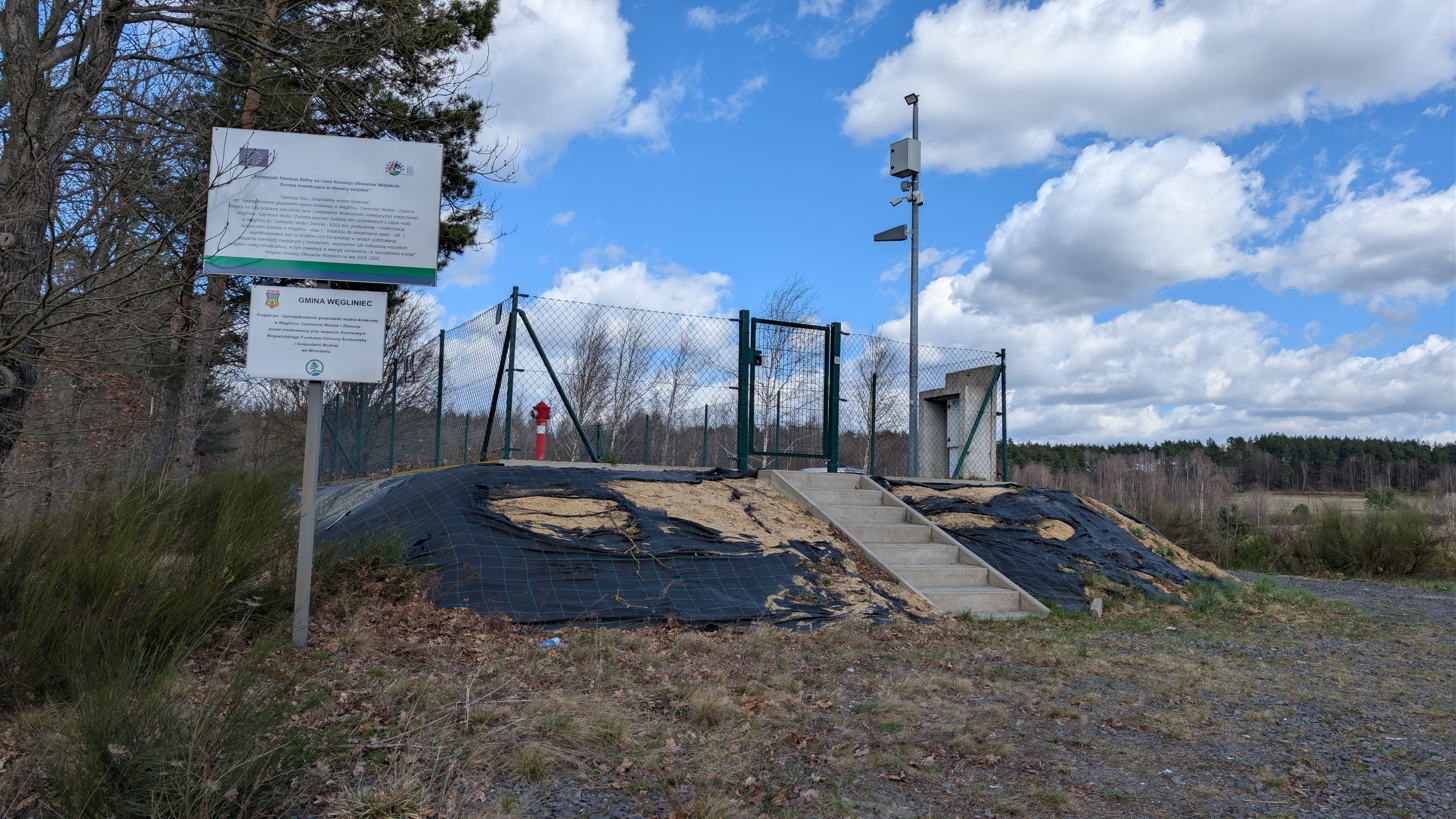
Pumping station at the site of the former station, built in 2018

The station was opened by the Kohlfurt–Rothwasser Light Railway Company as Rothwasser Niederbahnhof on 22 October 1913. Between 1914 and 1931 the station was named Rothwasser (Ober/Lausitz) Niederbahnhof for designation.

The station contained a loading bay with a ramp, which was accessed with via a second track. A siding branched off directly south of the station into refractory plant. The line to Czerwona Woda curved south-east of the station.

After World War II, the area came under Polish administration. As a result, the station was taken over by Polish State Railways, and was renamed to Czerwona Woda Dworzec Północny. It was renamed to its modern name, Czerwona Woda Północna, in 1947.

The station closed on 27 May 1967, with the Węgliniec–Czerwona Woda railway being fully dismantled in 1974. Some freight trains continued to use the line prior to its full dismantle.

In 2018, Gmina Węgliniec built a pumping station at the site of the former station. This connected to a 4.5 km (2.8 mi) water and 3.7 km (2.3 mi) sewage pipeline along the Węgliniec–Czerwona Woda railway.

== Former services ==
Preceding station	Disused railways	Following station
Zgorzelec Nadleśnictwo towards Węgliniec	Polish State Railways; Węgliniec–Czerwona Woda	Czerwona Woda; Terminus
