= Redwater =

Redwater or red water may refer to:

== Geographical locations ==
- Redwater, Mississippi
- Redwater, Texas
- Redwater River, a stream in Montana
- Athabasca-Redwater provincial electoral district in Alberta, Canada
- Redwater, Alberta, a town in Alberta, Canada
- Redwater, Ontario, an unincorporated place and railway point in Ontario, Canada
- Redwater River (Alberta) a river in Alberta, Canada
- Czerwona Woda, places in Poland named "redwater"

== Other ==
- Red Water, 2003 television film
- Kat and Alfie: Redwater, 2017 BBC series
- Blood
- Red water, a waste product in TNT manufacture; see pink water
- Red water, a fictional liquid in the Fullmetal Alchemist series—see Alchemy in art and entertainment
- "Red Water", a song by Type O Negative from the album October Rust
- "Red Water", a song by Earl Sweatshirt from the album Some Rap Songs
- Red water disease, an English appellation for babesiosis, a tick-borne disease of animals
