= Czerwona Woda railway station =

Former railway station in Czerwona Woda, Poland

Czerwona Woda
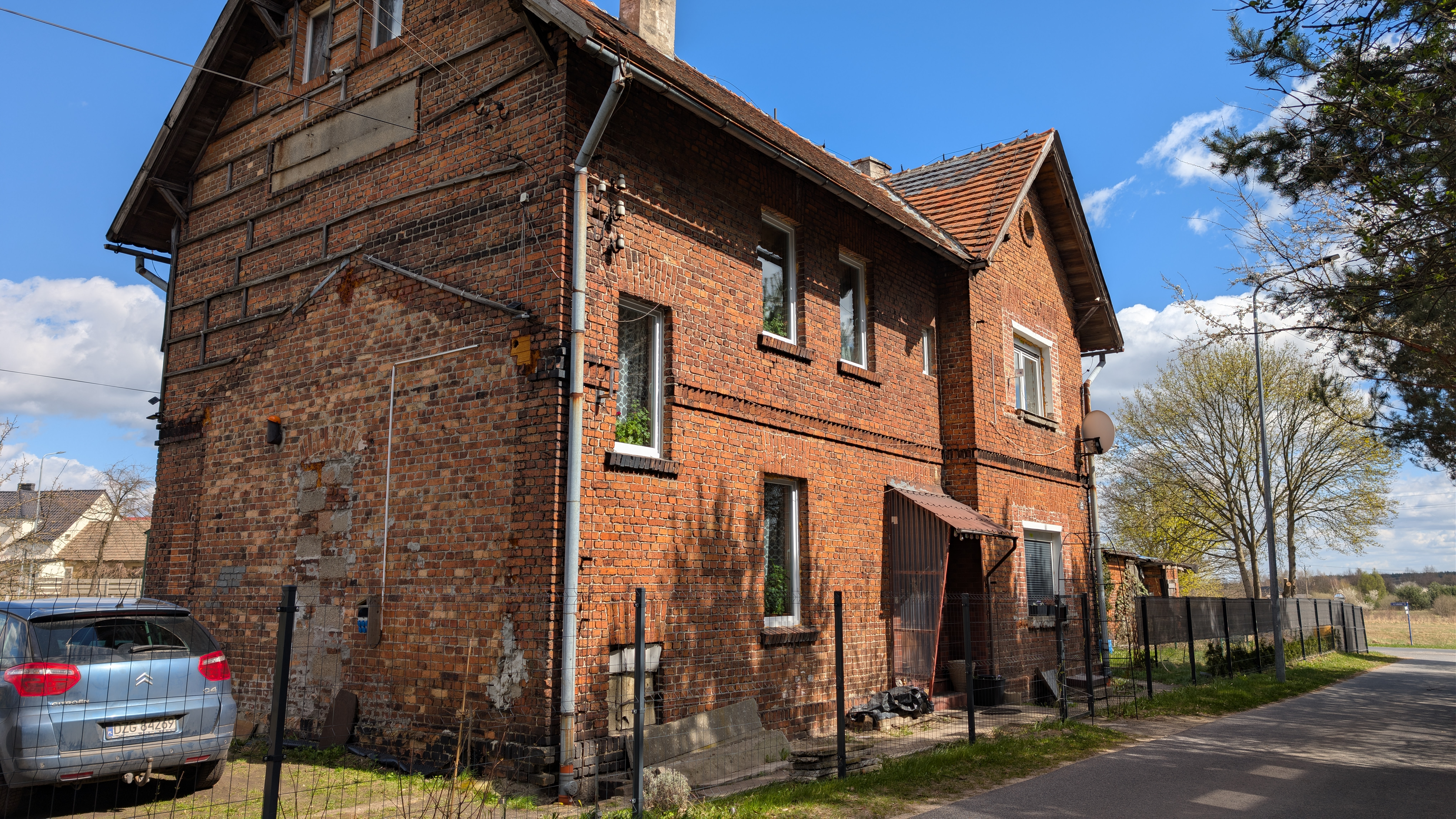
- Former station building in 2026

General information
- Location: Czerwona Woda, Lower Silesian Voivodeship; Poland
- Owner: Polish State Railways
- Line: Węgliniec–Czerwona Woda railway
- Platforms: 1

History
- Opened: 22 October 1913
- Closed: 27 May 1967
Location
- Location within Poland Location within Lower Silesian Voivodeship

Czerwona Woda (German: Rothwasser) was a railway station on the Węgliniec–Czerwona Woda railway in the village of Czerwona Woda, Zgorzelec County, within the Lower Silesian Voivodeship in south-western Poland.

== History ==
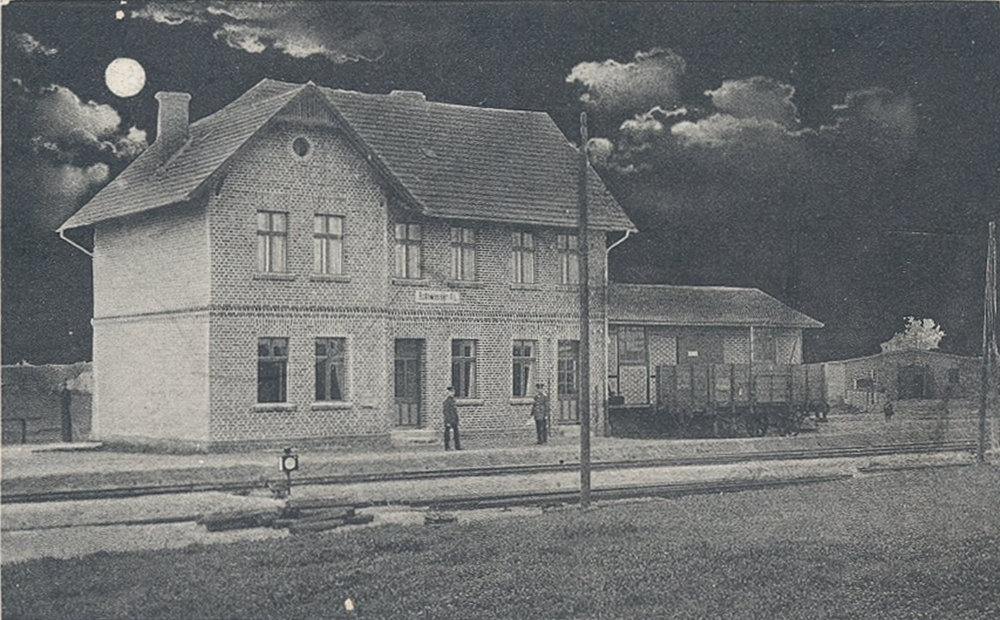
Station in 1916

The station was opened by the Kohlfurt–Rothwasser Light Railway Company as Rothwasser on 22 October 1913. The following year the station was renamed to Rothwasser (Oberlausitz), and later to Rothwasser Hauptbahnhof in 1930.

Locomotives of the Kohlfurt–Rothwasser Light Railway Company which served the line were maintained at a nearby locomotive shed. The station also included numerous sidings with loading bays. One of the sidings branched east to the nearby Sturm brickyard. A signalbox was also based here.

After World War II, the area came under Polish administration. As a result, the station was taken over by Polish State Railways, and was renamed to Czerwona Woda. The locomotive shed was closed, with locomotives being maintained at Węgliniec instead. All loading bays were also closed.

The station closed on 27 May 1967, with the Węgliniec–Czerwona Woda railway being fully dismantled in 1974.

== Former services ==
Preceding station	Disused railways	Following station
Czerwona Woda Północna towards Węgliniec	Polish State Railways; Węgliniec–Czerwona Woda	Terminus
