= Hans Rauch =

- Born: 1 March 1899; Rothwasser, German Empire
- Died: 22 August 1958 (aged 59); Traben-Trarbach, West Germany
- Military career
- Allegiance: Nazi Germany
- Branch: Luftwaffe
- Rank: Generalmajor
- Conflicts: World War II
- Awards: Knight's Cross of the Iron Cross

Hans Rauch (1 March 1899 – 22 August 1958) was a general in the Luftwaffe of Nazi Germany during World War II. He was a recipient of the Knight's Cross of the Iron Cross.

== Awards and decorations ==
- Knight's Cross of the Iron Cross on 6 December 1944 as Oberst and commander of Flak-Sturm-Regiment 41 (mot)
