= Whiteway (surname) =

Whiteway is an English surname. Notable people with the surname include:

- Adrian Whiteway (born 1990), British equestrian
- Alfred Charles Whiteway (1932–1953), British convicted murderer
- Dean Whiteway (born 1944), Canadian politician
- Douglas Whiteway (born 1961), Canadian journalist and author
- Jesse Whiteway (1863–1940), merchant and politician in Newfoundland
- Jules Whiteway-Wilkinson, British brewery owner and convicted felon

== Disambiguation pages ==
- John Whiteway (disambiguation)
- William Whiteway (disambiguation)
