= Goldway =

Goldway may refer to:

- Ruth Y. Goldway, American member of the Postal Regulatory Commission
- Shenzhen Goldway Industrial, Chinese manufacturer of medical devices
