= Shenzhen Goldway Industrial =

Chinese manufacturer of medical devices

Shenzhen Goldway Industrial, Inc.
- Industry: Medical equipment manufacturing
- Founded: 1995
- Headquarters: Shenzhen, Guangdong Province, People's Republic of China
- Number of employees: 300
- Parent: Philips
- Website: http://www.goldwayinc.com/ http://www.goldwayhealthcare.com/

Shenzhen Goldway Industrial (Chinese: 深圳市金科威实业有限公司) is a Chinese manufacturer of medical devices.

In 2008 Royal Philips Electronics acquired Shenzhen Goldway Industrial. Philips cited the desire to expand in China and emerging markets for the acquisition.
