= Redway (surname) =

Redway is a surname.

== List of the people with the surname ==
- Alan Redway (born 1935), Canadian lawyer and former politician
- Mike Redway (born 1939), English singer, songwriter and record producer
- Millicent Redway, Jamaican-Canadian businessperson and publisher
