= Redway School =

Redway School may mean:

- Redway School (Humboldt County) is in Humboldt County, California
- The Redway School, Milton Keynes is in Milton Keynes, England
