= William Whiteway (disambiguation) =

William Whiteway (1828–1908) was a Newfoundland politician.

William Whiteway may also refer to:

- William Whiteway (MP) (1570–1640), MP for Dorchester
- William Tuff Whiteway (1856–1940), Canadian architect
- William Whiteway (diarist) (1599–1635), English merchant and politician
