= Węgliniec railway station =

Major railway junction and station in Lower Silesia

Coordinates: 51°17′24.32″N 15°13′23″E

Węgliniec
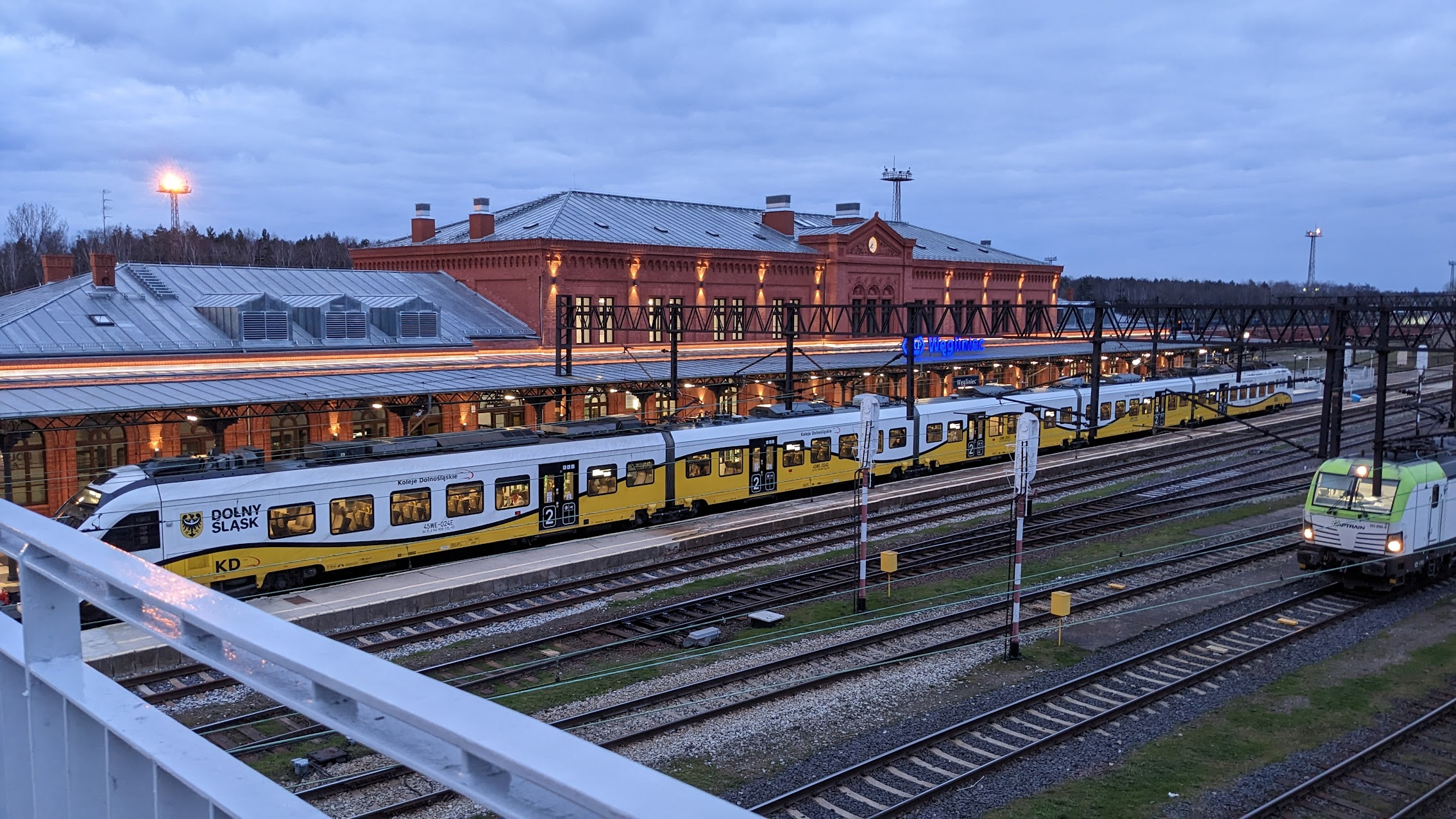
- Main station building in 2023

General information
- Location: Węgliniec, Lower Silesian Voivodeship; Poland
- Owner: Polskie Koleje Państwowe S.A.
- Lines: Węgliniec–Roßlau railway; Węgliniec–Görlitz railway; Miłkowice–Jasień railway; Węgliniec–Lubań railway; Węgliniec–Czerwona Woda railway (closed)
- Platforms: 8

History
- Opened: 1 September 1846
- Electrified: 1928–1945, again in 1979
- Former names: Kohlfurt (1846–1945); Kaławsk (1945–1947)

Services
Preceding station	PKP Intercity	Following station
Bolesławiec towards Warszawa Wschodnia	IC	Pieńsk towards Zgorzelec
Preceding station	KD	Following station
Zagajnik towards Wrocław Główny	D1	Gierałtów towards Lubań Śląski
Zagajnik towards Wrocław Główny	D10	Pieńsk towards Dresden Hauptbahnhof
Preceding station	Polregio	Following station
Stary Węgliniec towards Zielona Góra Główna	PR	Pieńsk towards Görlitz
Location
- Location within Poland

Węgliniec (German: Kohlfurt) is a major Polish railway station and junction in the town of Węgliniec, Lower Silesia. The station is the second largest freight terminal in the region (after Wrocław Brochów), and is one of the most important railway stations and junctions in Lower Silesia. It is located in the northern end of the town of Węgliniec, Zgorzelec County within the Lower Silesian Voivodeship in the Lower Silesian Forest.

Węgliniec is also an international station, and is served by both regional and intercity services to Warsaw, Wrocław, Berlin, Dresden, (Note: Trains to Berlin and Dresden are operated by Lower Silesian Railways only during weekends.) Görlitz/Zgorzelec, Lubań, and Żary.

The entire railway junction covers an area of about 82 ha (200 acres), stretching approximately 3.5 km (2.2 mi) in length, and 500 m (550 yd) in width. Around 40% of all freight railway traffic on the German border is handled here.

The station is a former marshalling yard, and now functions as a shunting station, for both passenger and freight trains. It plays an important role as the station handles freight traffic to and from the German border.

== History ==
=== Pre World War II ===
==== Line extensions ====
The station was opened on 1 September 1846 with the opening of the Berlin–Wrocław railway. On 15 November, the Węgliniec–Görlitz railway line opened first to Jędrzychowice, and was later extended to Görlitz/Zgorzelec on 1 September 1847. Four passenger trains ran daily on the line.

On the north side of the train station, an extensive marshalling yard was built, with 18 tracks accessible from both east and west, three stub tracks on the east side, and three stub tracks on the west side. Depending on the destination, freight trains could be sorted with humps at either the east end or the west ends of the station. A communications tower was built for the western hump, to remotely control retarders. These sidings are now used to stable freight trains.

On 22 January 1862 the Landtag of Prussia approved the construction of a railway line to Lubań. Construction began in September 1863, and the line opened two years later on 20 September 1865. The line was electrified in 1928.

The last extension was to Czerwona Woda, which branched off a smaller station, Kolfurt Kleinbahnhof (Polish: Węgliniec Dworzec Mały) lit. 'Węgliniec little station'. The line was standard gauge and opened on 22 October 1913.

==== 1891 train collision ====
On 18 October 1891, a locomotive transferring the last carriages bound for Dresden crashed into the side of an express train incoming from Wrocław and bound for Berlin. Eight people were killed in the accident, and another six were seriously injured. The cause of the collision was the 'carelessness' of the locomotive driver bound for Dresden.

=== Post World War II ===
Shortly after the end of World War II, the Red Army dismantled the overhead wires to Lubań, unelectrifying the line, and also removed one of the line of tracks to Żary, making the railway line a single track. This was all done under 'Soviet reparation claims'. The whole line from Węgliniec to Żary is still a single track to this day.

Kohlfurt (Węgliniec) came under Polish administration. The town was renamed to Kaławsk, and renamed once again to its modern name, Węgliniec on 6 September 1947. Under the new administration, Polish State Railways took over the ownership of the station.

In 1945, the little station (Kolfurt Kleinbahnhof) was closed. As a result trains from Czerwona Woda terminated at this station instead. Passenger and freight trains were in operation on this line until it closed on 1 October 1966. The line was later dismantled on 17 May 1974. The industrial branch line to Zielonka closed in the mid 1970s.

Węgliniec was re-electrified from 1977 to 1979. The line to Lubań was re-electrified and modernised in 1987.

== Modernisations and renovations after World War II ==
=== Line modernisations ===
After 2000, work on electrifying the lines part of the E30 main line was resumed. In 2011, work began on the electrification of the line to Horka, past the German border. Electrification towards Zgorzelec was planned for 2015–2017. However, work did not begin until September 2018. The line to Zgorzelec was then fully modernised and electrified in December 2019.

Before the line modernisations, passengers arriving from Wrocław had to transfer from electric multiple units to diesel railbuses heading towards Zgorzelec, Jelenia Góra and Żary. After the modernisation in 2019, direct services using electric multiple units were in service between Zgorzelec and Wrocław.

=== Station renovation ===
In December 2020, Polish State Railways signed a contract for the full renovation and restoration of the station, in the historical style to what the station looked like when it opened in 1846. The project included the restoration of both the main and west station buildings, part of the pedestrian footbridge over the tracks, and the canopies adjacent to the station buildings, whose columns will be restored in historical style.

The main station building went through a restoration of its brick façade (together with rich architectural details). The historically styled window and door joinery received damp-proofing, internal insulation, replacement of ceilings, reinforcement of the roof structure, and renewal of the roof covering. A lift was also installed, with the opening of new waiting room facilities and a small cinema theater.

The project was completed in August 2022, and costed a total of over 41 million Polish złoty (PLN), or €9.6 million.

== Train services ==
The station is served by both regional and intercity trains, Lower Silesian Railways, Polregio, and PKP Intercity.

Until mid-December 2014 the station was also served by EuroCity "Wawel", which ran once every day between Berlin Hauptbahnhof and Wrocław Główny. This service was replaced by Lower Silesian Railways weekend-only service from Wrocław Główny to Berlin Lichtenberg/Ostkreuz via Węgliniec.

The station is served by the following services:

- Intercity services (IC) Zgorzelec - Legnica - Wrocław - Ostrów Wielkopolski - Łódź - Warszawa
- Regional services (KD) Lubań Sląski - Węgliniec - Legnica - Wrocław
- Regional services (KD) Berlin - Cottbus - Węgliniec - Legnica - Wrocław (only on weekends)
- Regional services (R) Görlitz/Zgorzelec - Węgliniec - Żary - Zielona Góra

=== Former ===
Preceding station	Disused railways	Following station
Terminus	Polish State Railways; Węgliniec–Czerwona Woda	Węgliniec Dworzec Mały

== Gallery ==
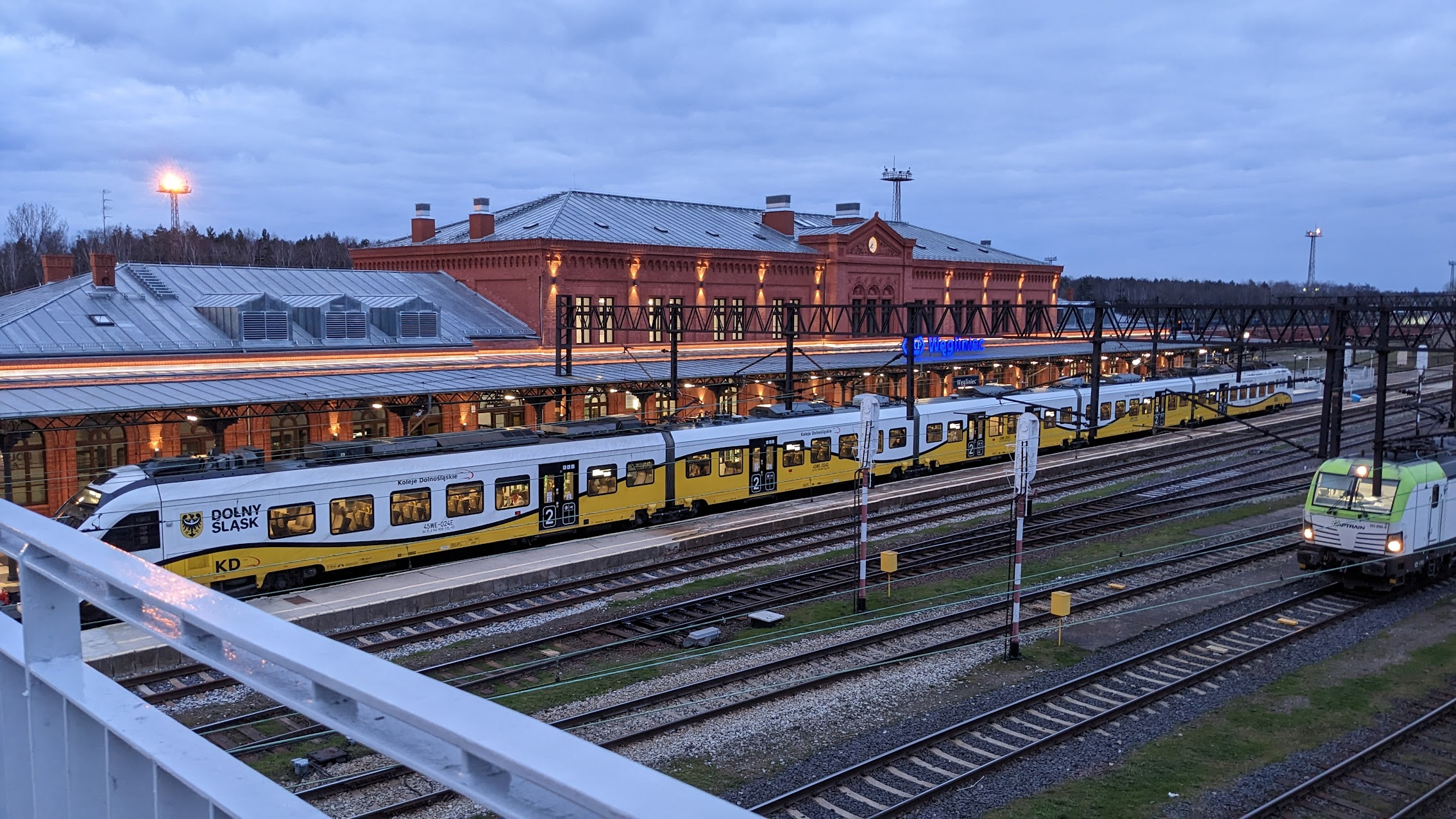
Main station building

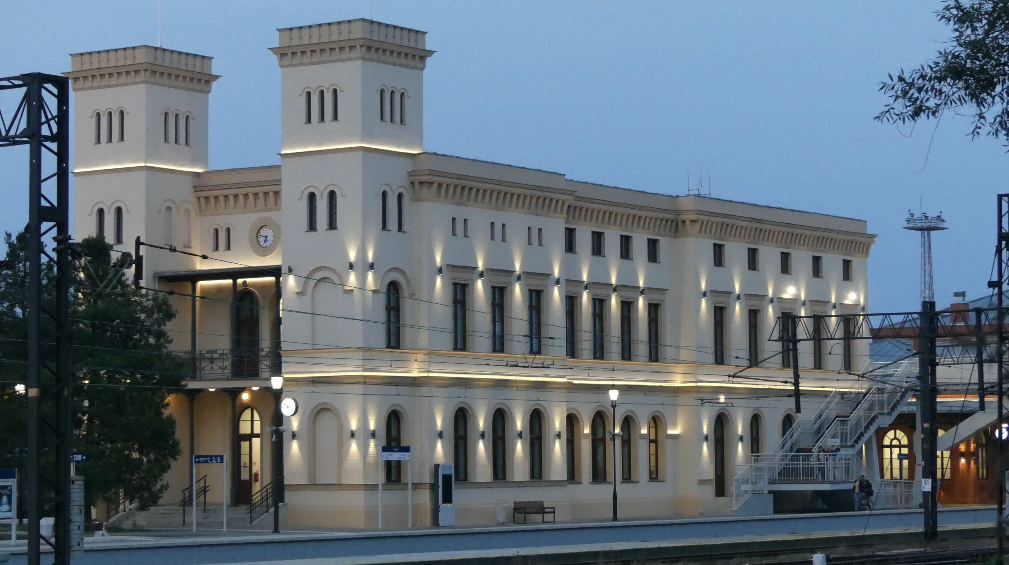
Western station building

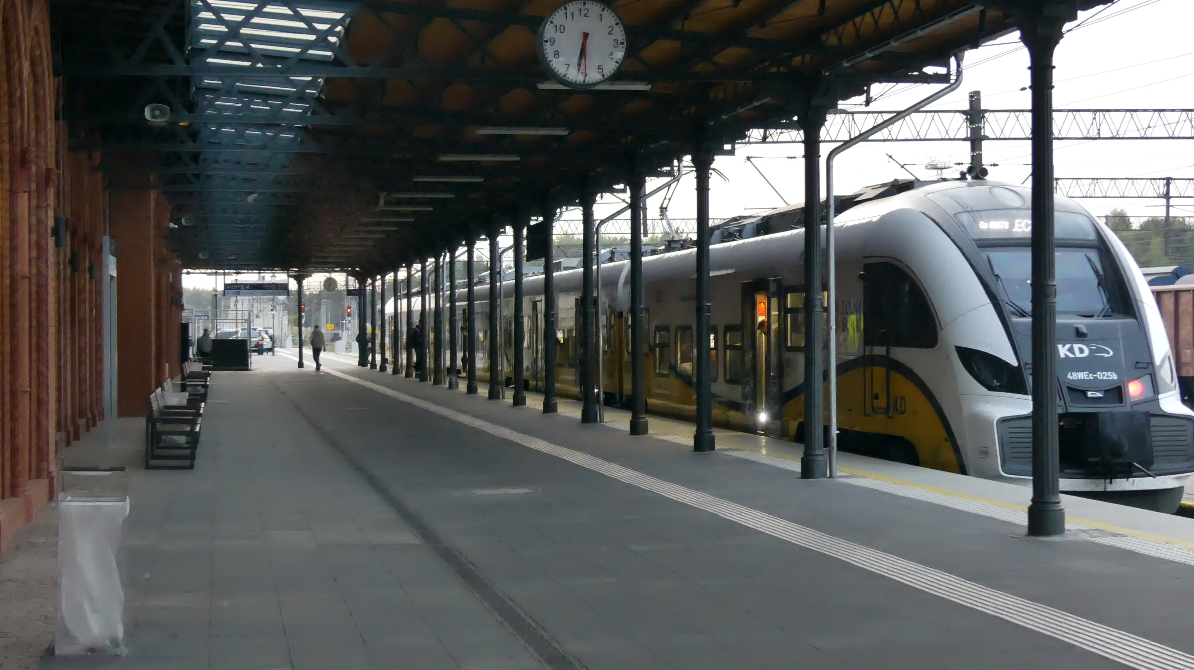
Platform 3

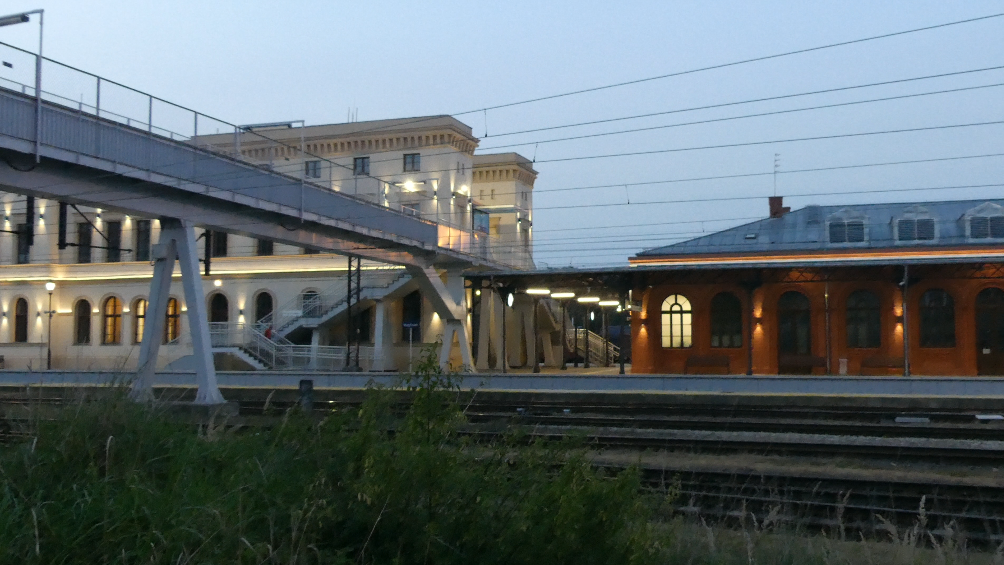
Footbridge and platforms

=== Prior to renovations ===
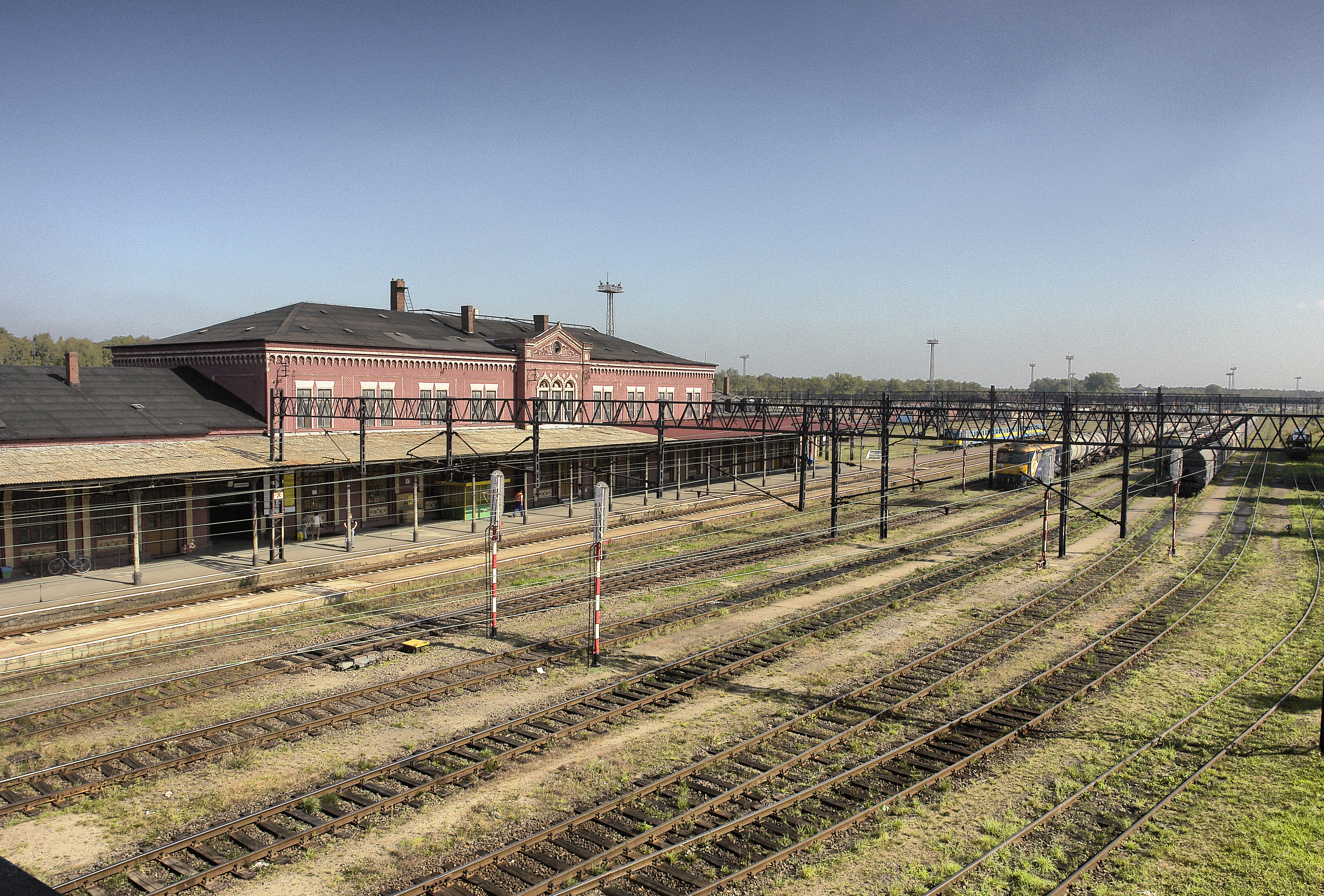
Main station building

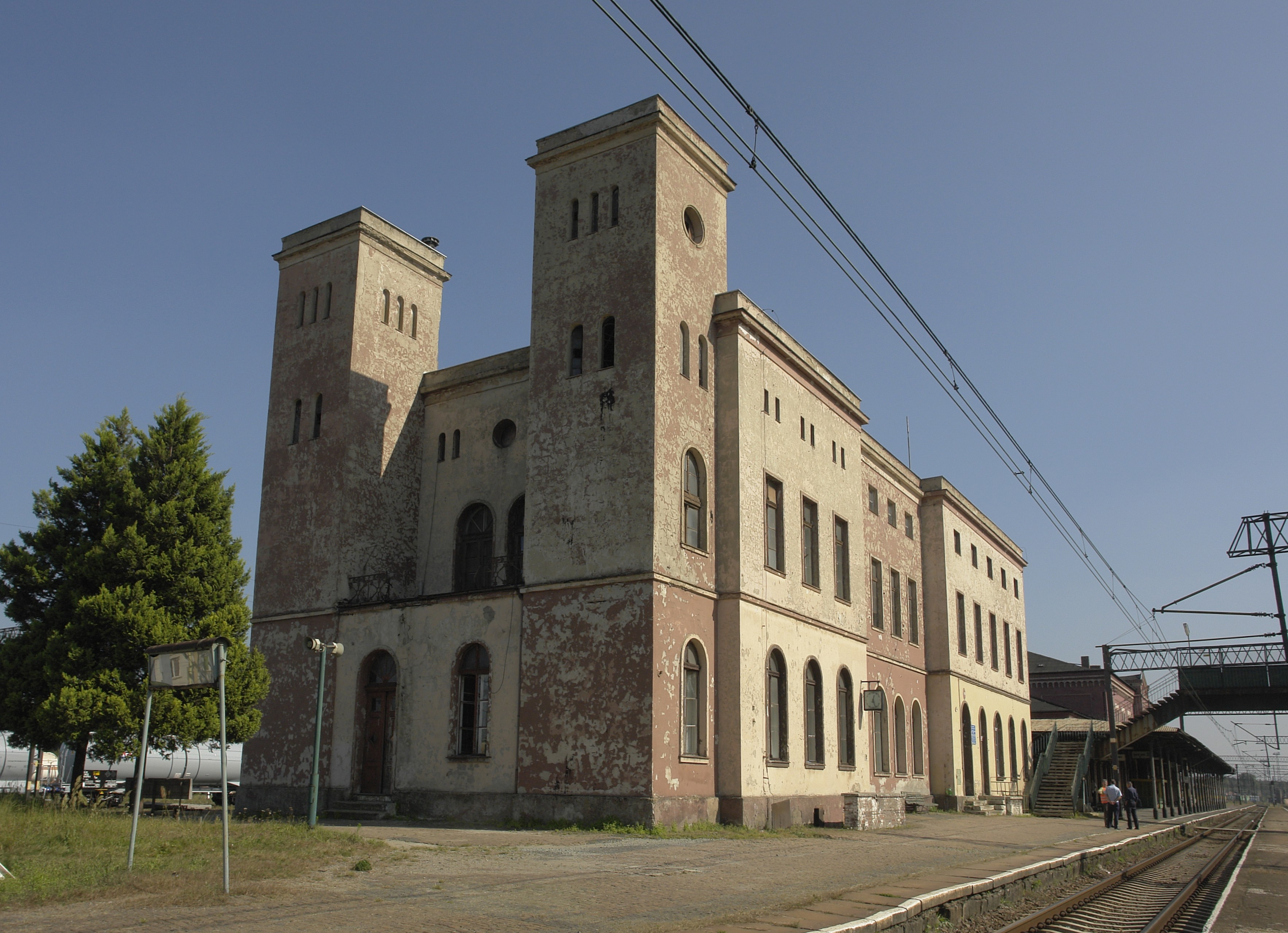
Western station building

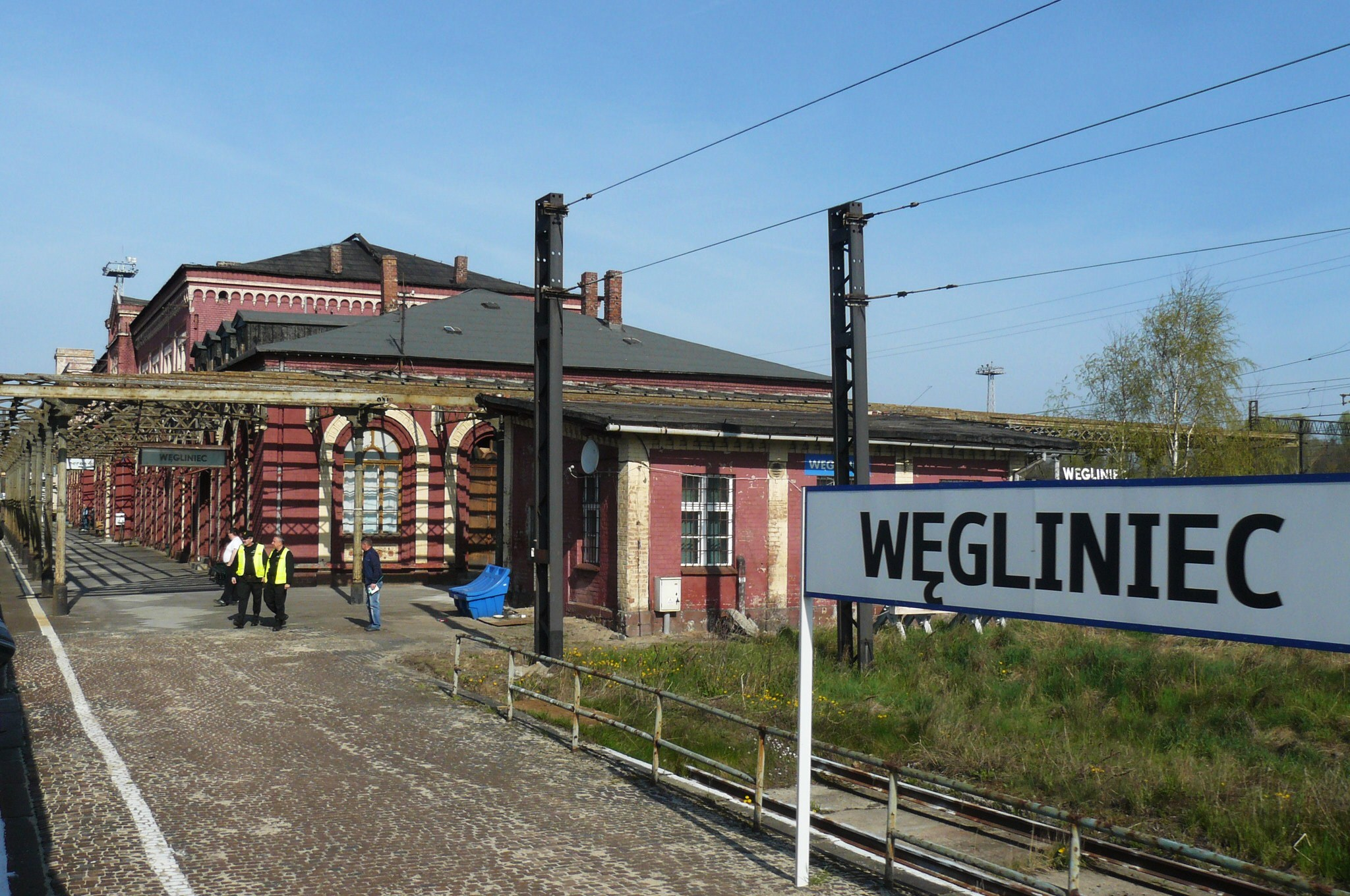
Eastern end of the station

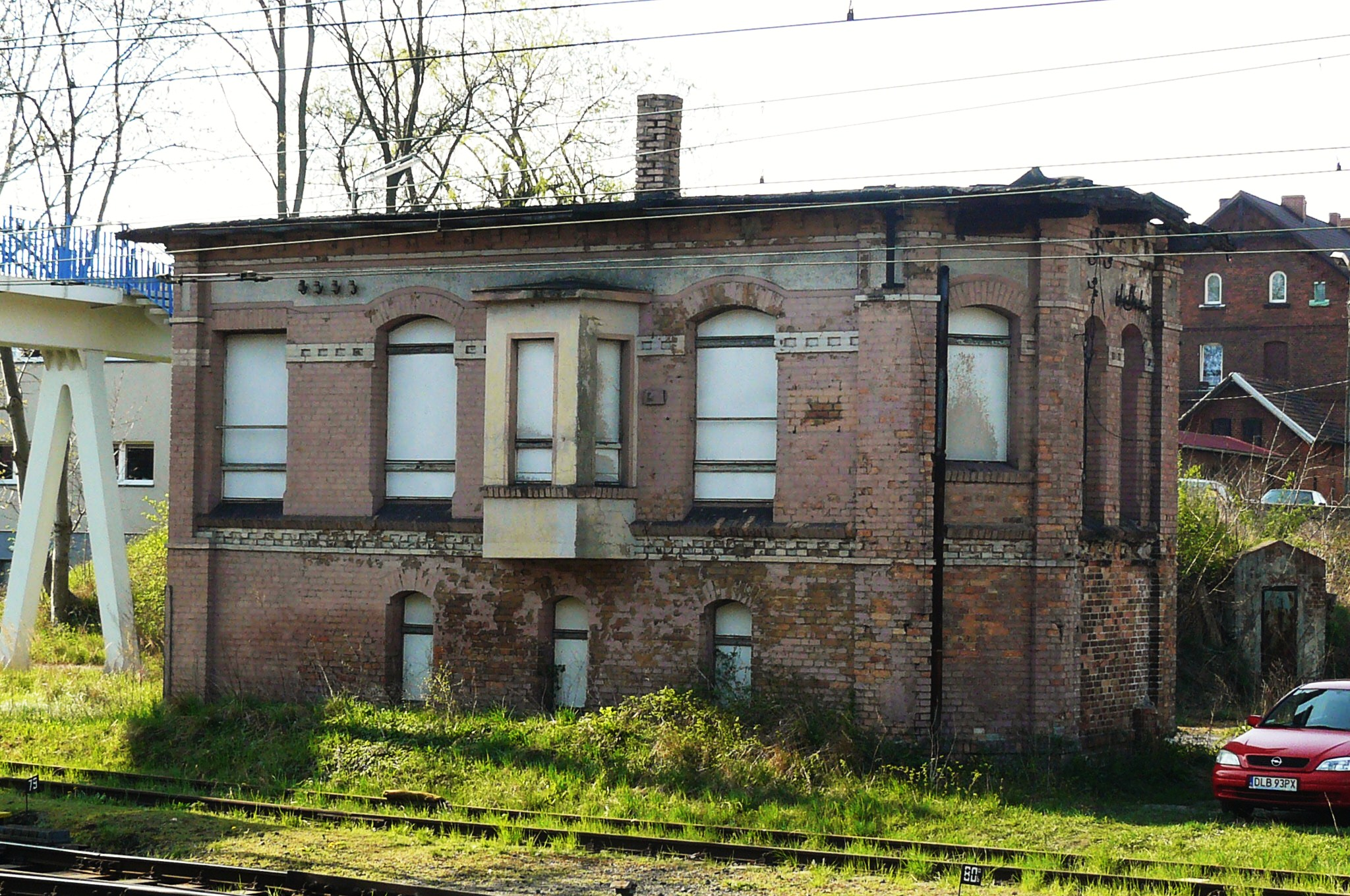
Old signal box

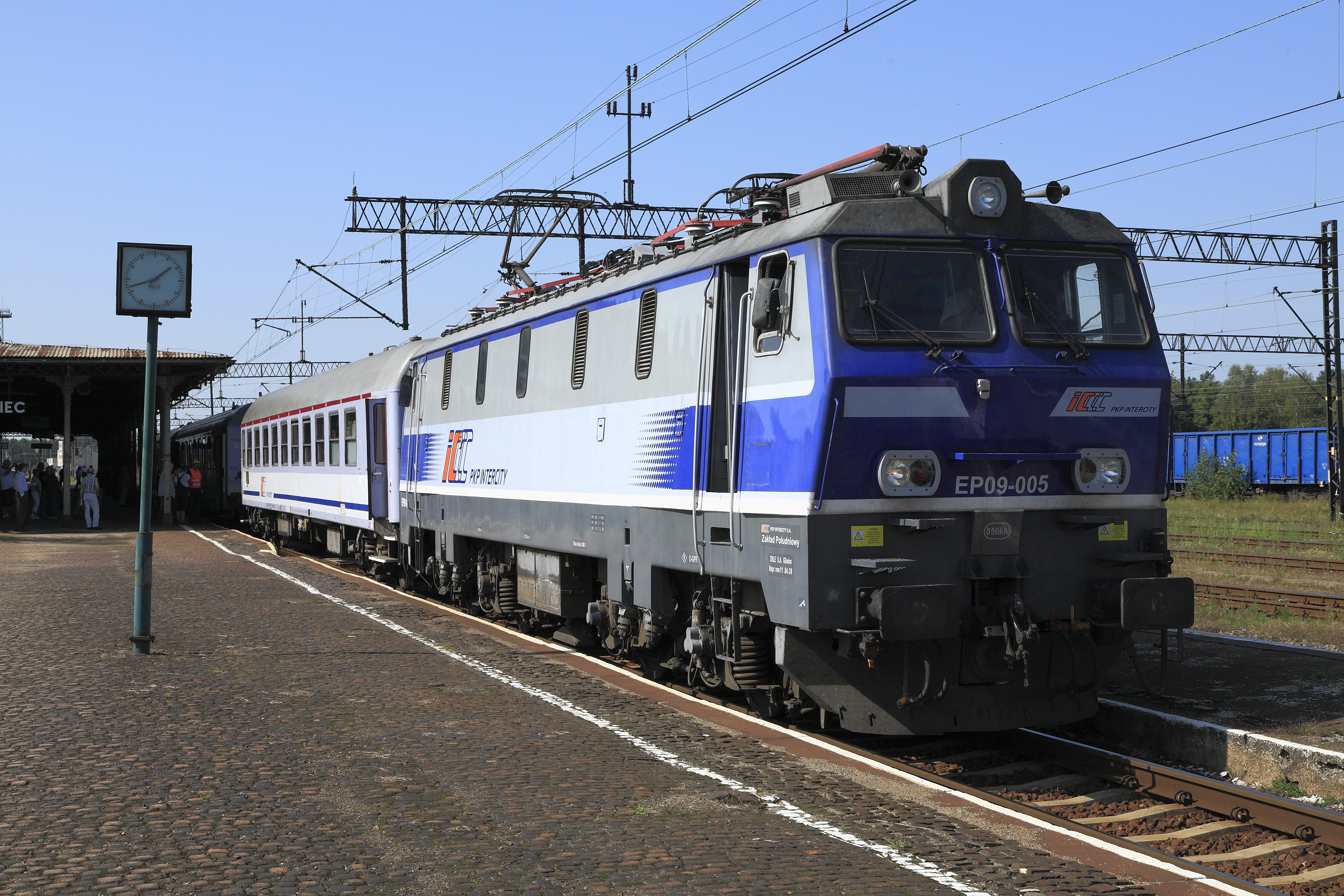
PKP class EP09 transferring locomotive to Kraków

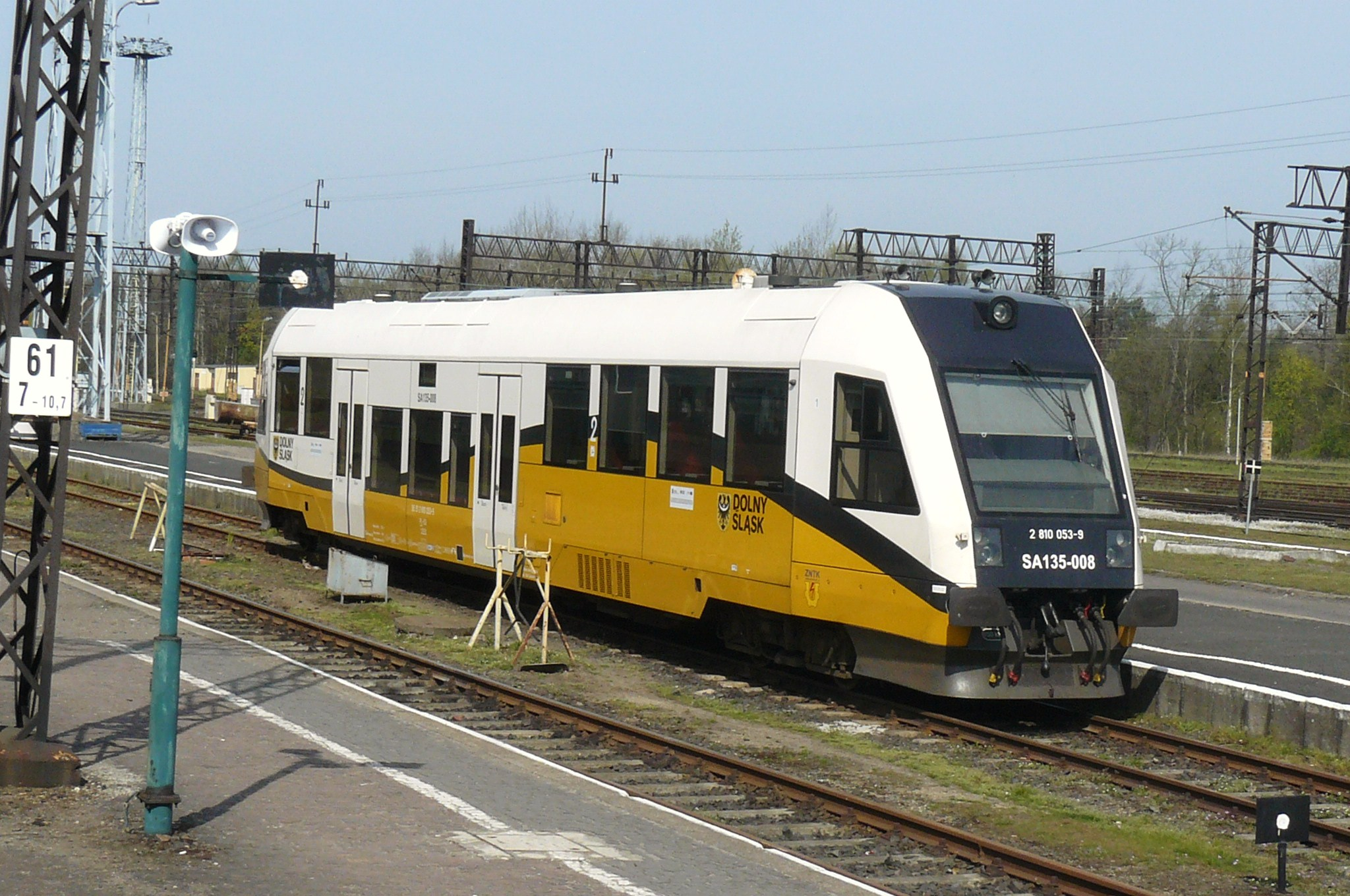
SA135

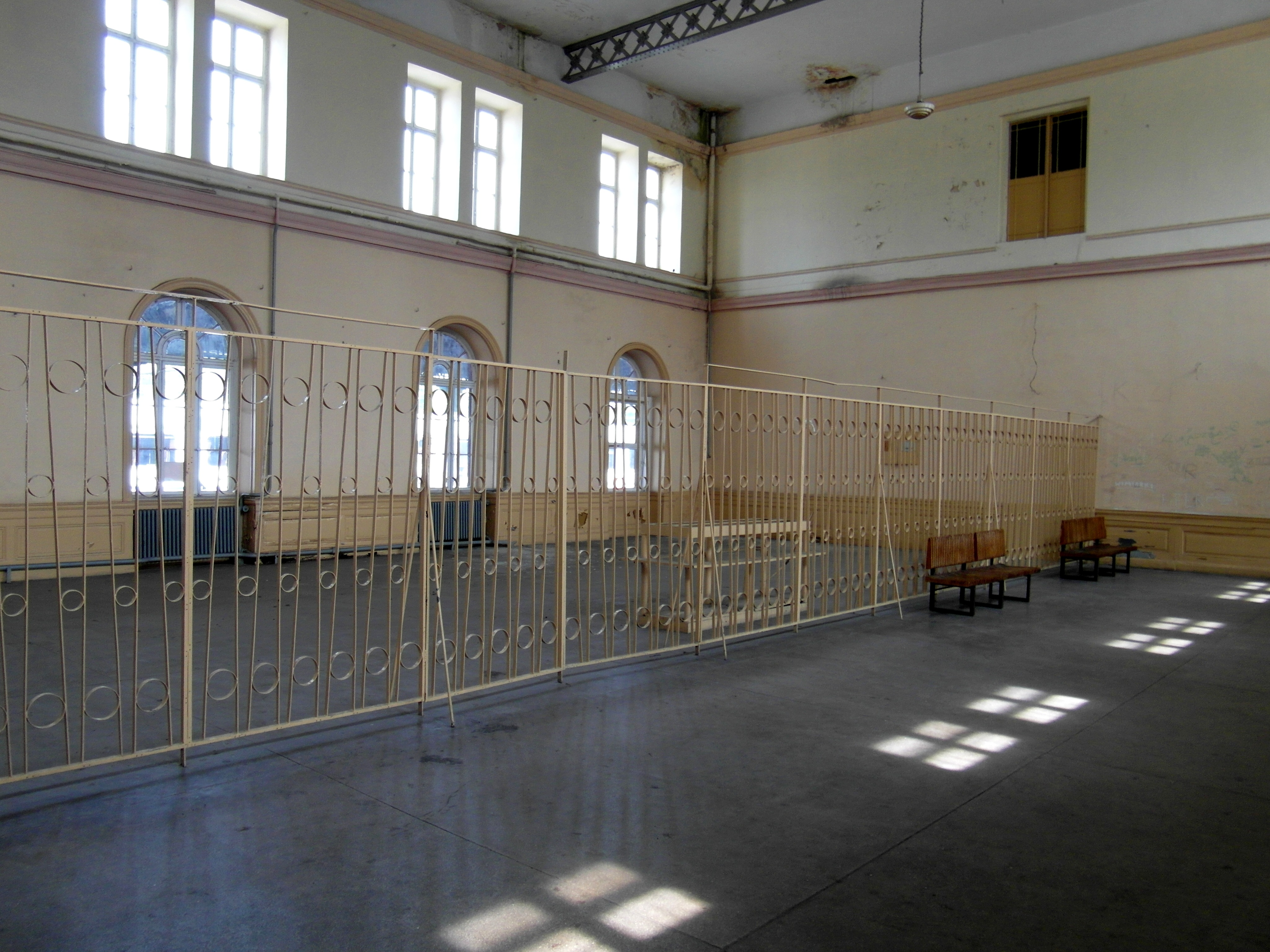
Waiting room

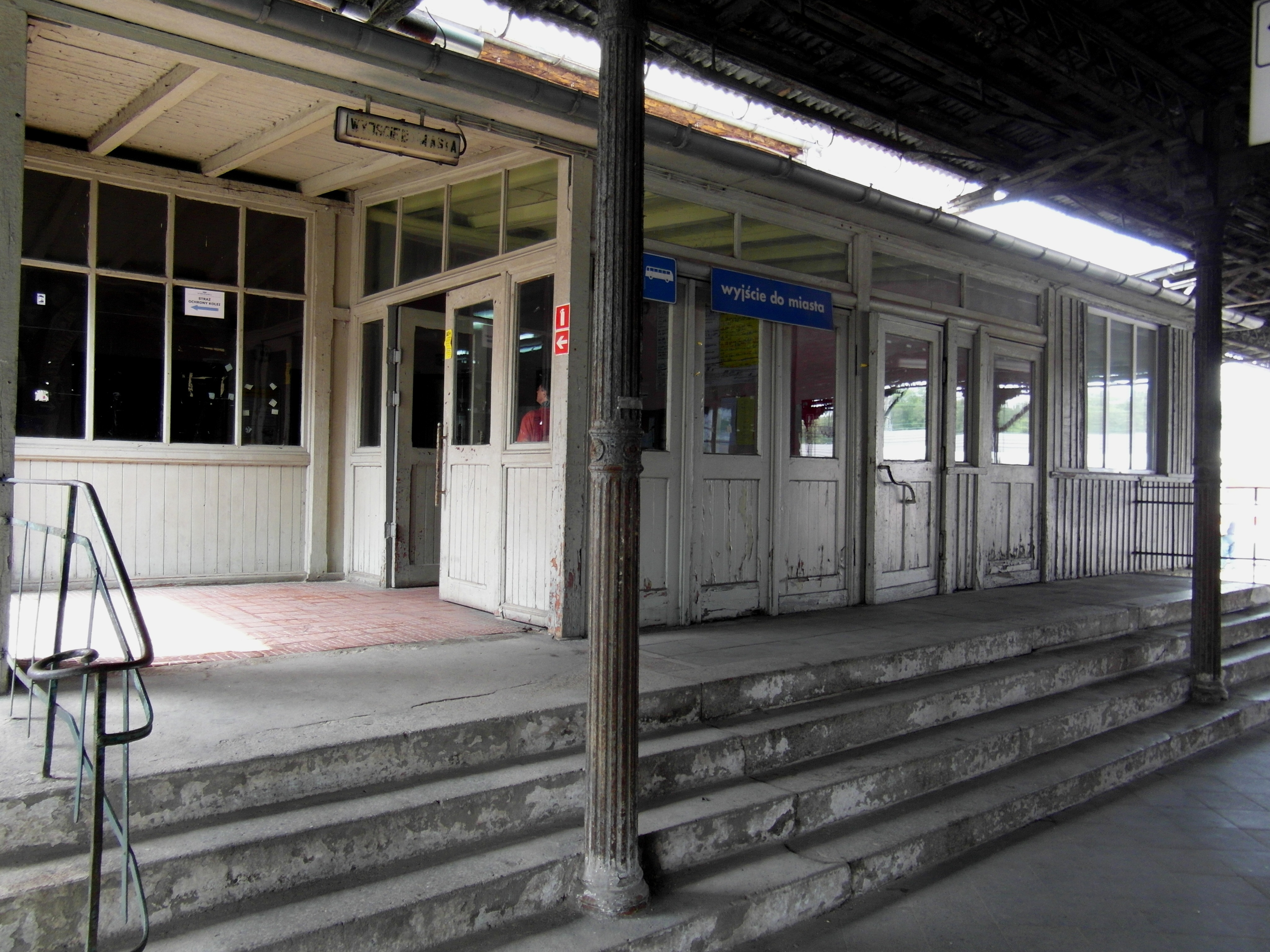
Entrance to ticket office

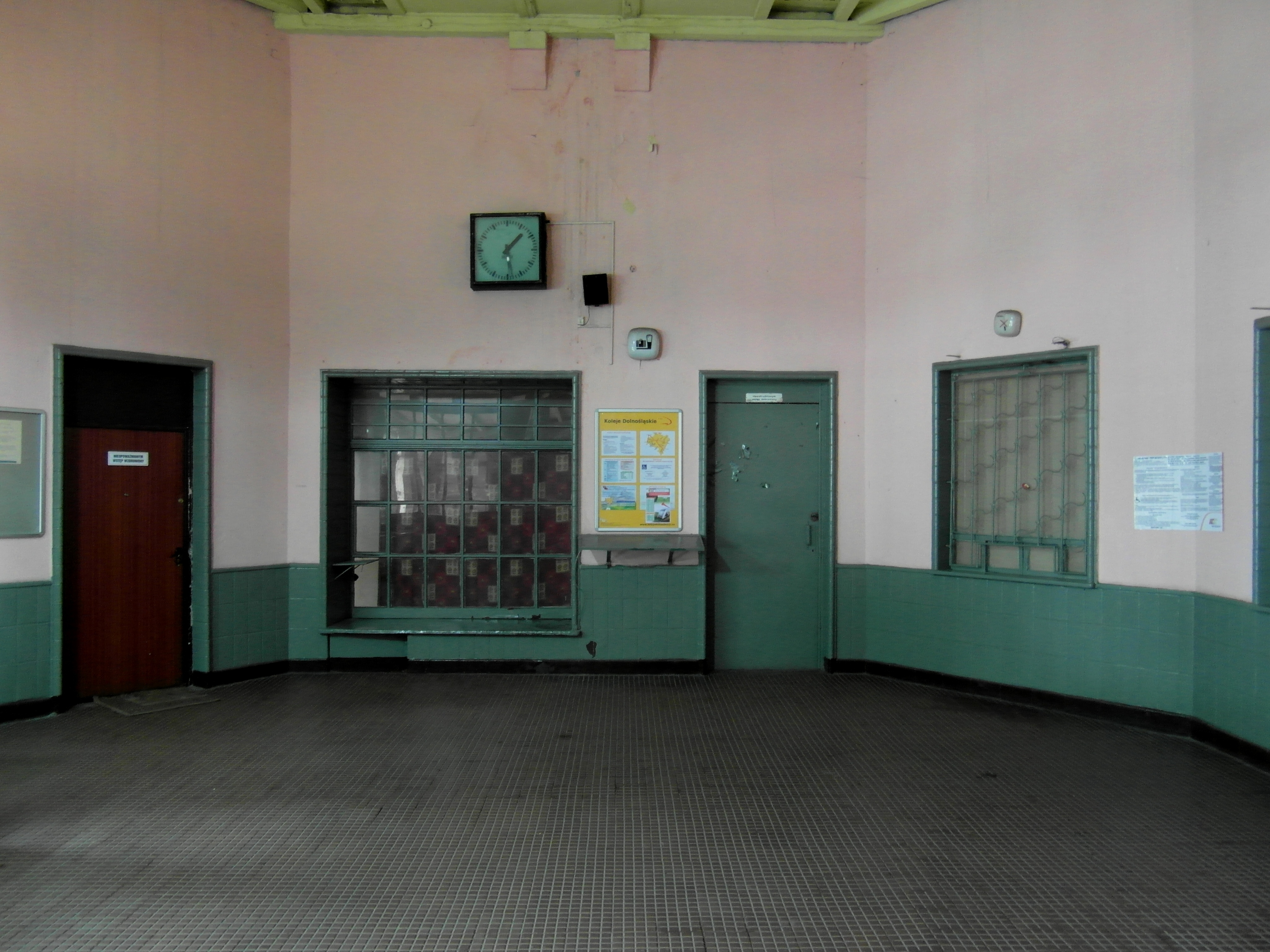
Ticket office

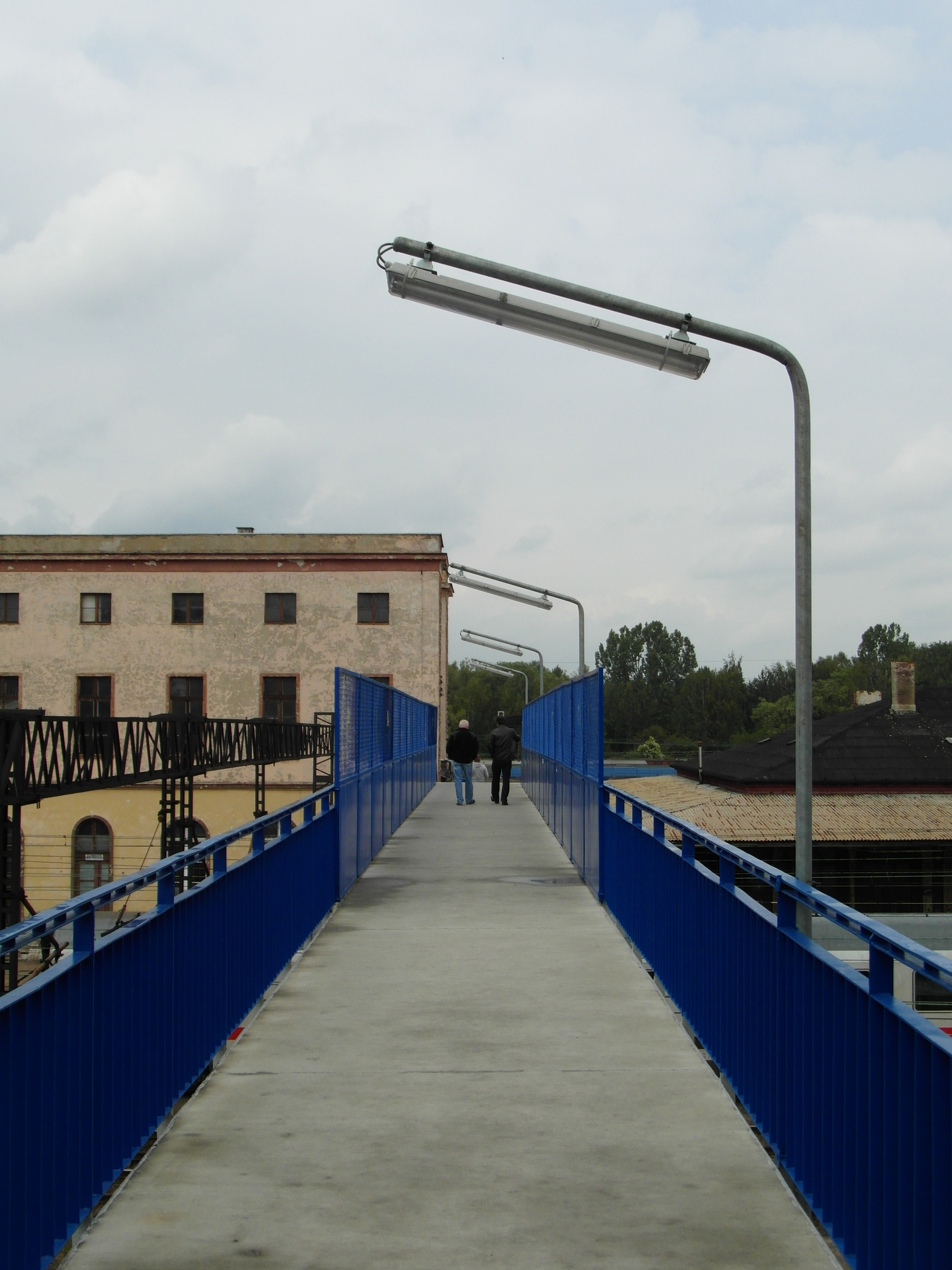
Footbridge over the railway
