= Czerwona Woda, Lower Silesian Voivodeship =

Czerwona Woda
- Village
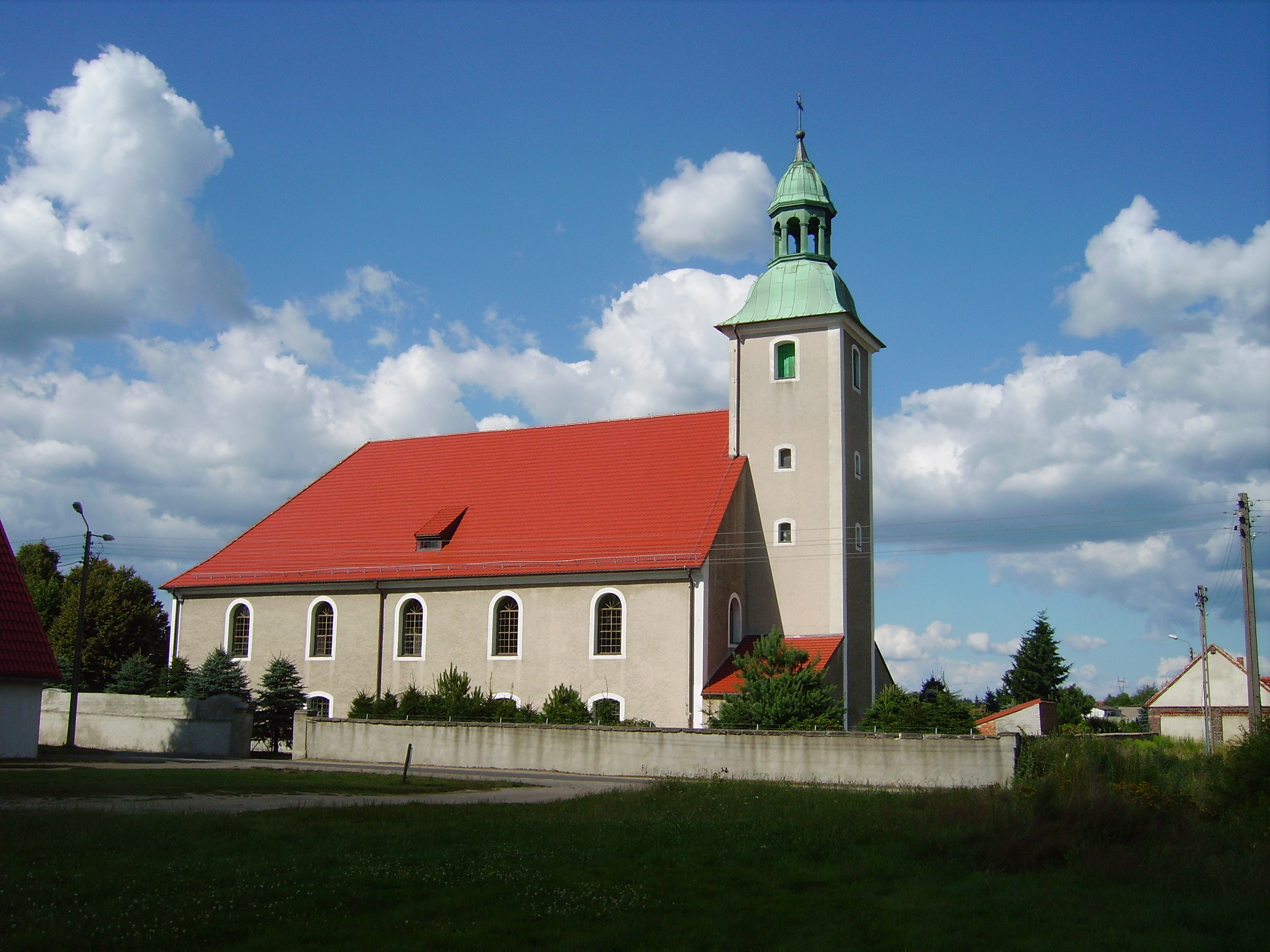
- Church of the Assumption of the Virgin Mary

- Location within Poland
- Coordinates: 51°14′59″N 15°12′48″E
- Country: Poland
- Voivodeship: Lower Silesian
- County: Zgorzelec
- Gmina: Węgliniec
- Population (2021): 1,629
- Time zone: UTC+1 (CET)
  - Summer (DST): UTC+2 (CEST)
- Postal code: 59-940
- Area code: +48 75
- Vehicle registration: DZG

Czerwona Woda [t͡ʂɛrˈvɔna ˈvɔda] lit. 'red water' (German: Rothwasser, Upper Sorbian: Čerwjena Woda) is a village in the Zgorzelec Forest, located in the administrative district of Gmina Węgliniec, within Zgorzelec County, Lower Silesian Voivodeship, in south-western Poland.

== Geography ==
Czerwona Woda lies approximately 4 km (2.5 mi) south of Węgliniec, 12 km (7.5 mi) east of Pieńsk, 18 km (11 mi) north-east of Zgorzelec, and 128 km (80 mi) west of the regional capital of Wrocław.

Near the village, there are deposits of iron ore and clay. The iron ore was never mined on a large industrial scale. This however is where the name of the village likely originated from, as deposits stained the water in local streams the colour red. Clay deposits began to be mined in 1809, and still are to this day. A kaolin clay mine is still in operation, and is the largest employer in the village.

== History ==
Czerwona Woda is one of the oldest villages in the Zgorzelec Forest, with the village likely founded between the 12th and 13th centuries. From 1491 to 1492, the village was owned by the Penzig family part of the Penzig state. After 1492, the village was handed over to the city of Görlitz.

The original church dated back to the late 15th century. By the 18th century, the church was too small for the growing population of the village, and lacked structural integrity. In 1767, parish priest Christophorus Schmied petitioned to the city of Görlitz for the approval and financial support of the construction of a new church for the village. The plan was approved, and the Church of the Assumption of the Virgin Mary opened in 1786.

On 22 October 1913, Czerwona Woda railway station opened. The line was used by both passenger and freight trains. Services were suspended on 27 May 1967, with the tracks later dismantled on 17 May 1974. The station building of this village still stands today and is now a residential building.

During World War II, from 17 February to 8 May 1945, the village was on the front line. Fighting and bombing in the village destroyed 86 residential buildings, including the church. The church was restored to its former glory by Father Stanisław Zając. The parish priest worked with full commitment and passion, from 1968 to 2000 as he thoroughly renovated the whole church and built a parish building.

== Sport ==
The local football team is Piast Czerwona Woda. The team's greatest success is promotion to the Jelenia Góra Division, where the team remained for two consecutive seasons: 2004/2005 and 2005/2006.

== Transport ==
=== Road ===
Voivodeship road 296 passes through Czerwona Woda.

== Notable residents ==
- Hans Rauch (1899–1958), Luftwaffe General
