= Węgliniec =

Railway town in south-west Poland

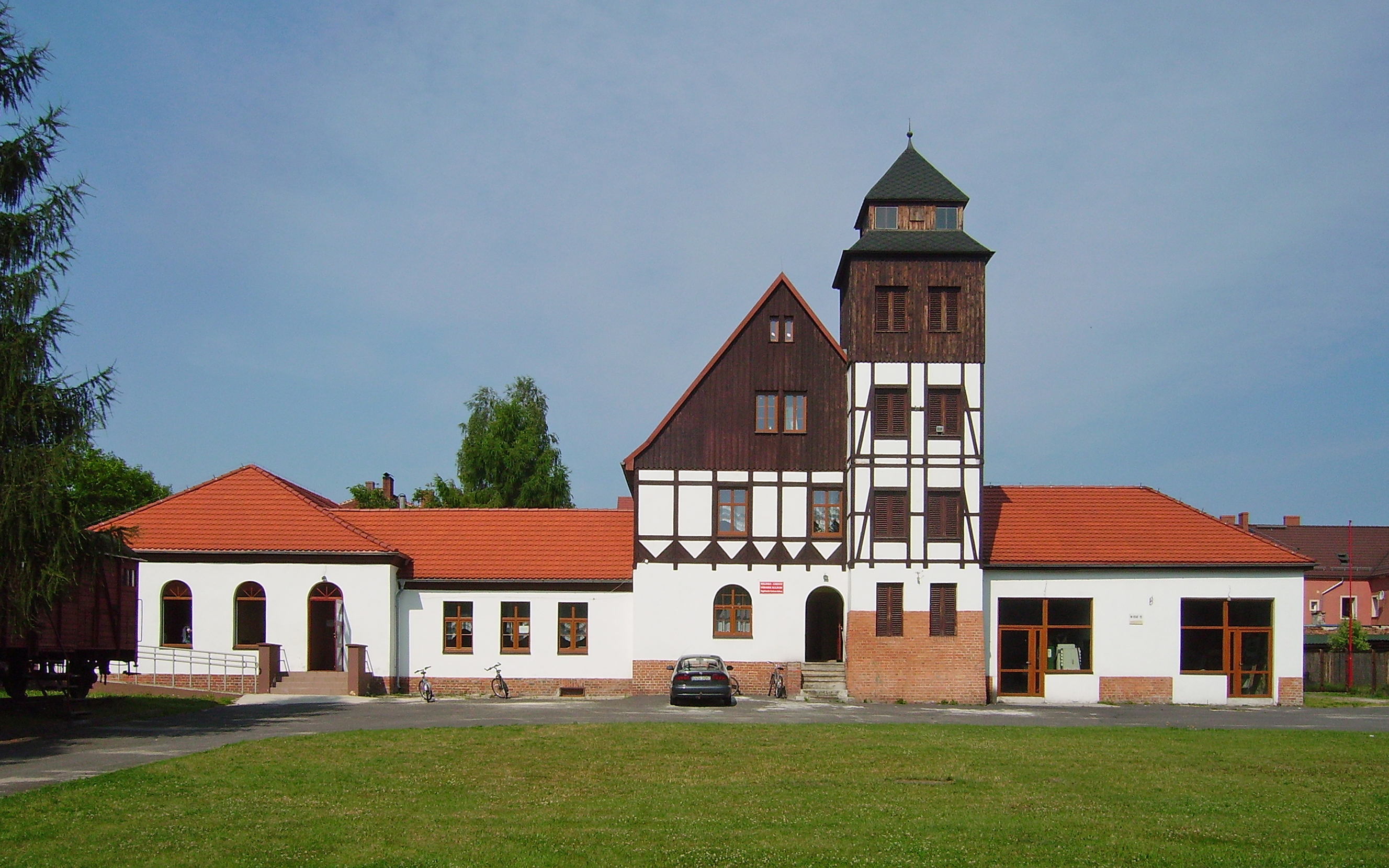
- Culture Center in Węgliniec

- Flag Coat of arms

- Location within Poland
- Coordinates: 51°17′18″N 15°13′32″E
- Country: Poland
- Voivodeship: Lower Silesian
- County: Zgorzelec
- Gmina: Węgliniec
- First mentioned: 1502
- Town rights: 1967

Government
  - Mayor: Mariusz Wieczorek

Area
  - Total: 8.71 km^{2} (3.36 sq mi)

Population (2024)
  - Total: 2,642
  - Density: 302.6/km^{2} (784/sq mi)
- Time zone: UTC+1 (CET)
  - Summer (DST): UTC+2 (CEST)
- Postal code: 59-940
- Area code: +48 75
- Car plates: DZG
- Climate: Cfb
- Website: http://www.wegliniec.pl

Węgliniec [vɛŋˈɡliɲɛt͡s] (German: Kohlfurt; Upper Sorbian: Wěgliniec) is a railway town in Zgorzelec County, Lower Silesian Voivodeship, in south-western Poland, close to the border with Germany. As of 2024, the town has a population of 2,642.

The town developed after the opening of Węgliniec railway station (part of the Berlin–Wrocław railway) in 1846. The station now serves as a major railway junction and marshalling yard for trains. Around 40% of all freight traffic on the German border is handled here.

== History ==
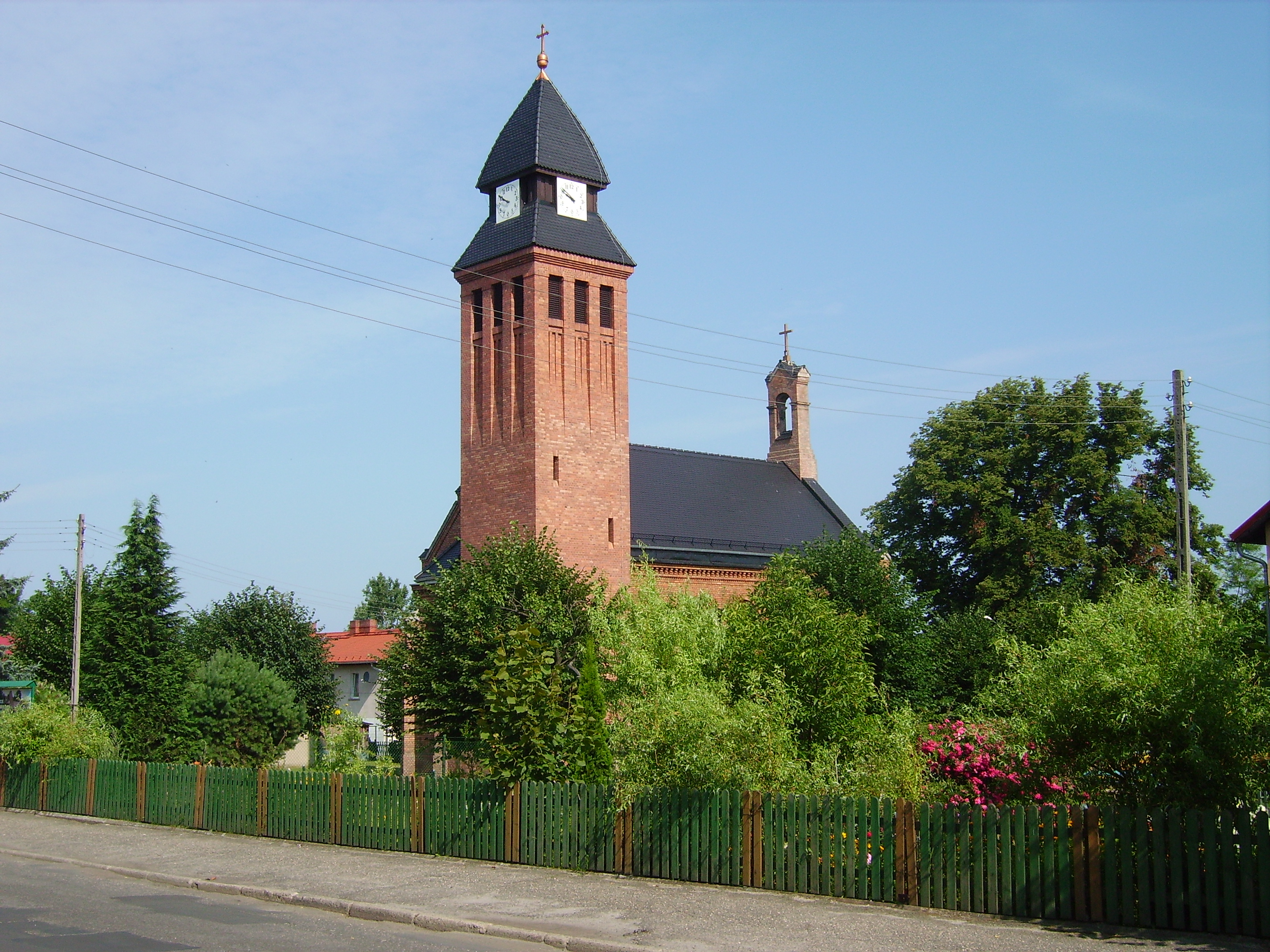
Virgin Mary Queen of Poland church in Węgliniec, opened in 1878

The oldest known historical mention of the settlement dates back to 1502 in the context of medieval German Ostsiedlung, receiving the name Kohlfurt. In 1742 it was annexed by Prussia. It was plundered by different armies during the Third Silesian War (1756–1763). In 1846 a railway line connecting Wrocław and Berlin, running through the small town, was opened. Initially, the station for this line was to be built close to Görlitz. However, due to local opposition, the station was built in Węgliniec. The line from Görlitz was originally part the Saxon railways, which came under Prussia ownership 1866. In 1847 a line to Dresden was built, and in 1865 to Lubań. The station is still one of the most important railway stations and junctions in Lower Silesia, with it also being the second largest freight train terminal in the region after Wrocław Brochów.

During World War II, the German administration built two prisoner-of-war labour subcamps and a forced labour camp. Near the end of World War II, in February 1945, the almost completely abandoned village of 30 people was captured by the Soviets. After World War II the region was placed preliminary under Polish administration according to the post-war Potsdam Agreement. It was repopulated with Poles, some of whom were from the Eastern Borderlands, which was annexed by the Soviet Union.

Węgliniec was granted town rights in 1967.

== Transport ==
=== Rail ===
Węgliniec railway station is a major railway junction and station, located on strategic passenger and freight routes between Poland and Germany, with international passenger services to Görlitz, Berlin and Dresden and national services to Warsaw, Wrocław, Zgorzelec, Lubań, and Żary. Regional services are operated by Lower Silesian Railways and Polregio.

=== Road ===
Voivodeship road 296 passes through the town and leads to the A4 motorway (part of the E40). It is 10 km (6.2 mi) away from Węgliniec.

== Twin towns – sister cities ==
See twin towns of Gmina Węgliniec.
