= Jerzmanki =

- Village
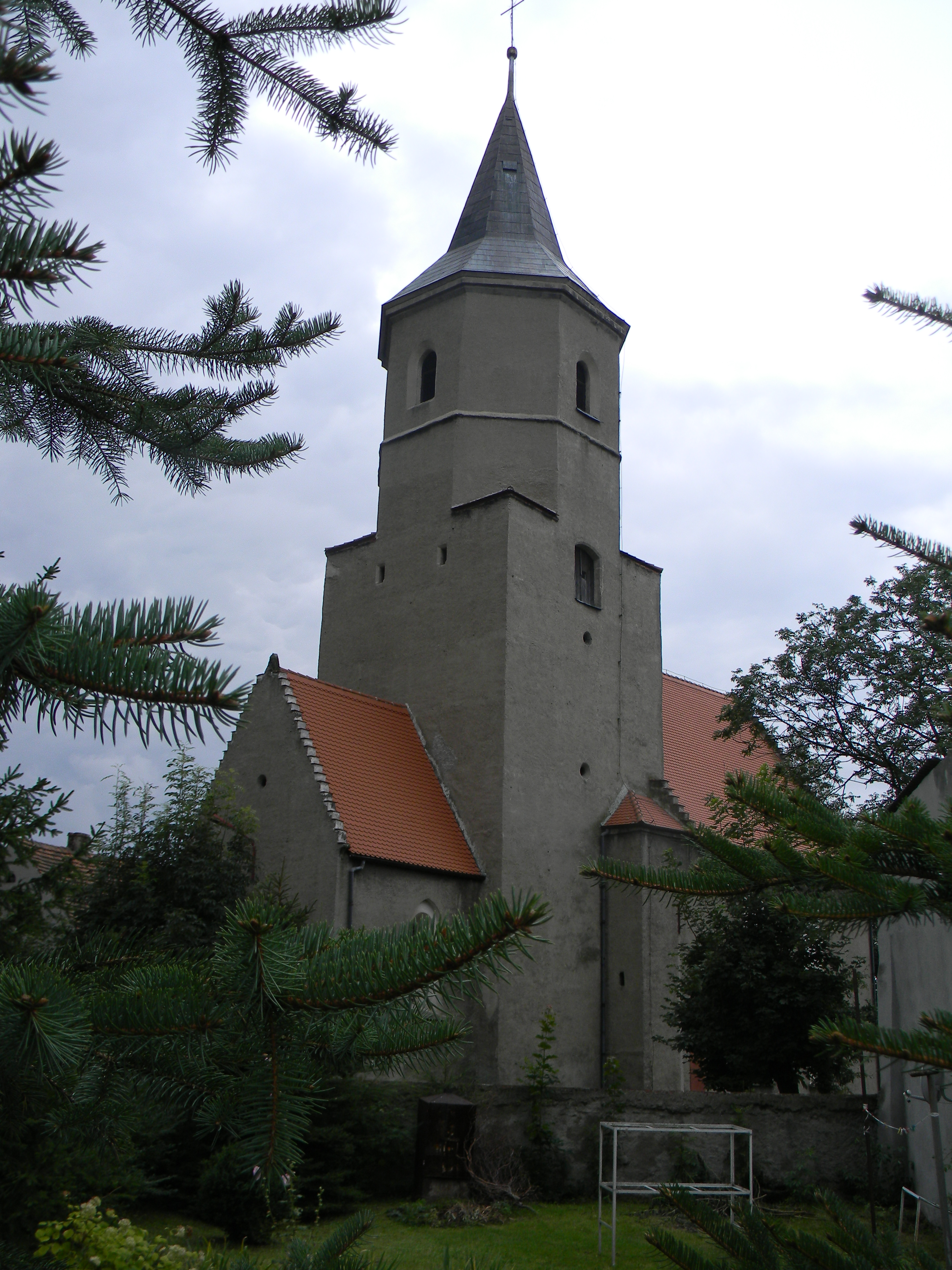

- Location within Poland
- Coordinates: 51°7′N 15°3′E
- Country: Poland
- Voivodeship: Lower Silesian
- County: Zgorzelec
- Gmina: Zgorzelec
- Population: 912

Jerzmanki [jɛʐˈmanki] (German: Hermsdorf) is a village in the administrative district of Gmina Zgorzelec, within Zgorzelec County, Lower Silesian Voivodeship, in south-western Poland, close to the German border.
