= Gozdanin, Lower Silesian Voivodeship =

Gozdanin
- Village
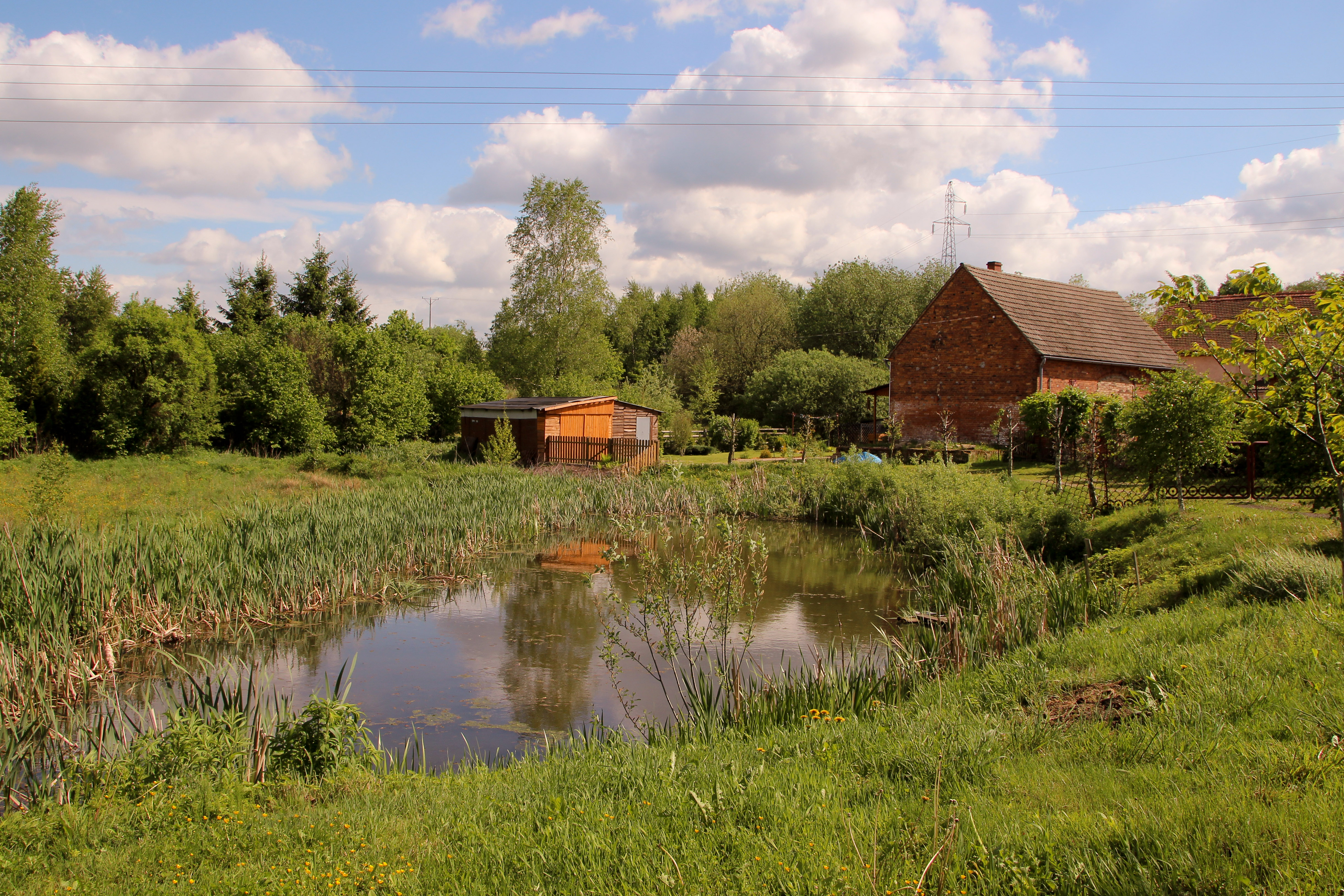

- Location within Poland
- Coordinates: 51°08′02″N 15°06′49″E
- Country: Poland
- Voivodeship: Lower Silesian
- County: Zgorzelec
- Gmina: Zgorzelec
- Population: 116

Gozdanin [ɡɔzˈdanin] (German: Lauterbach) is a village in the administrative district of Gmina Zgorzelec, within Zgorzelec County, Lower Silesian Voivodeship, in south-western Poland, close to the German border.
