= Pokrzywnik, Zgorzelec County =

Pokrzywnik
- Village
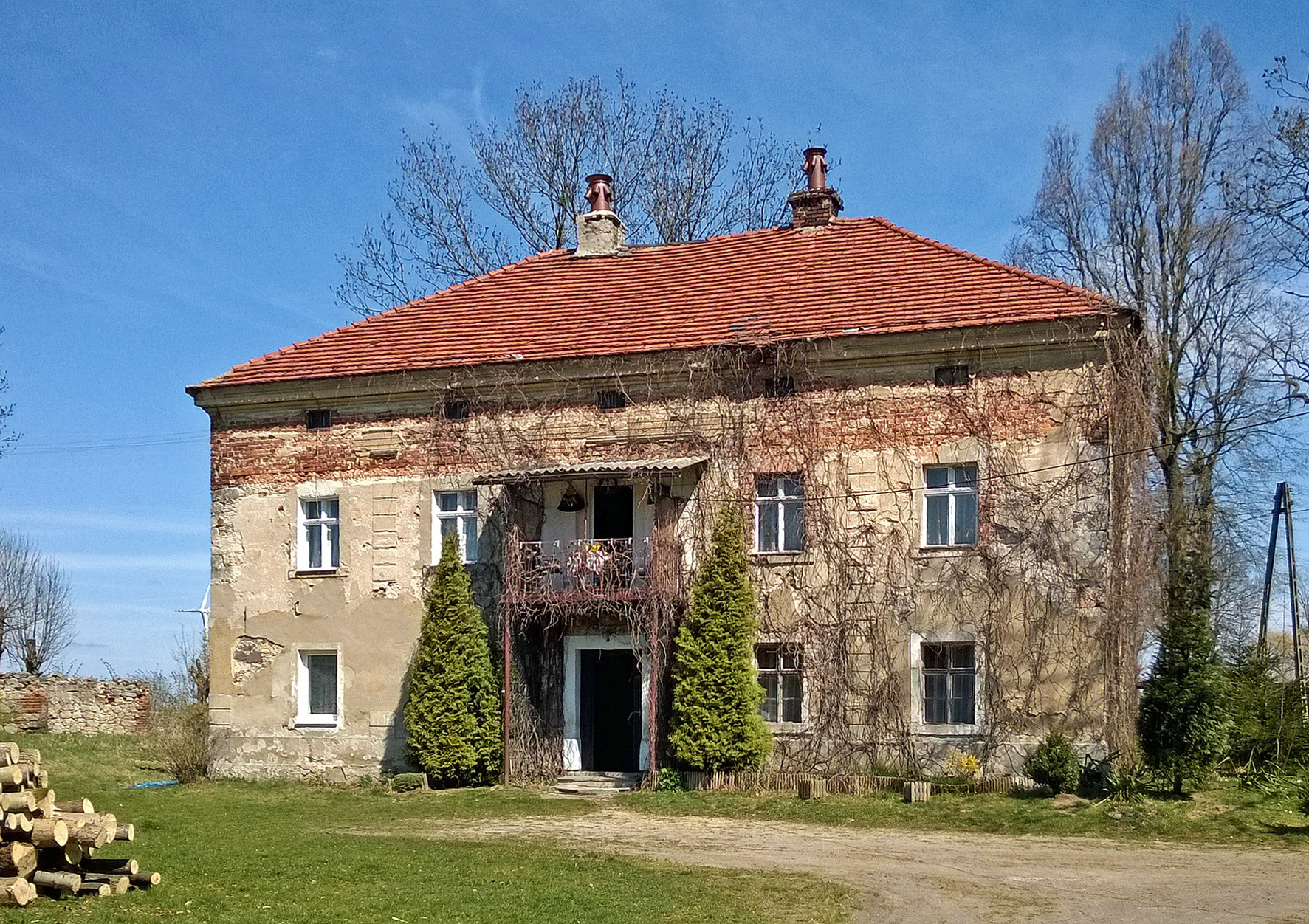
- Manor house

- Location within Poland
- Coordinates: 51°10′21″N 15°5′13″E
- Country: Poland
- Voivodeship: Lower Silesian
- County: Zgorzelec
- Gmina: Zgorzelec
- Population: 42

Pokrzywnik [pɔˈkʂɨvnik] (Upper Sorbian: Kopřiwa) is a village in the administrative district of Gmina Zgorzelec, within Zgorzelec County, Lower Silesian Voivodeship, in south-western Poland, close to the German border.

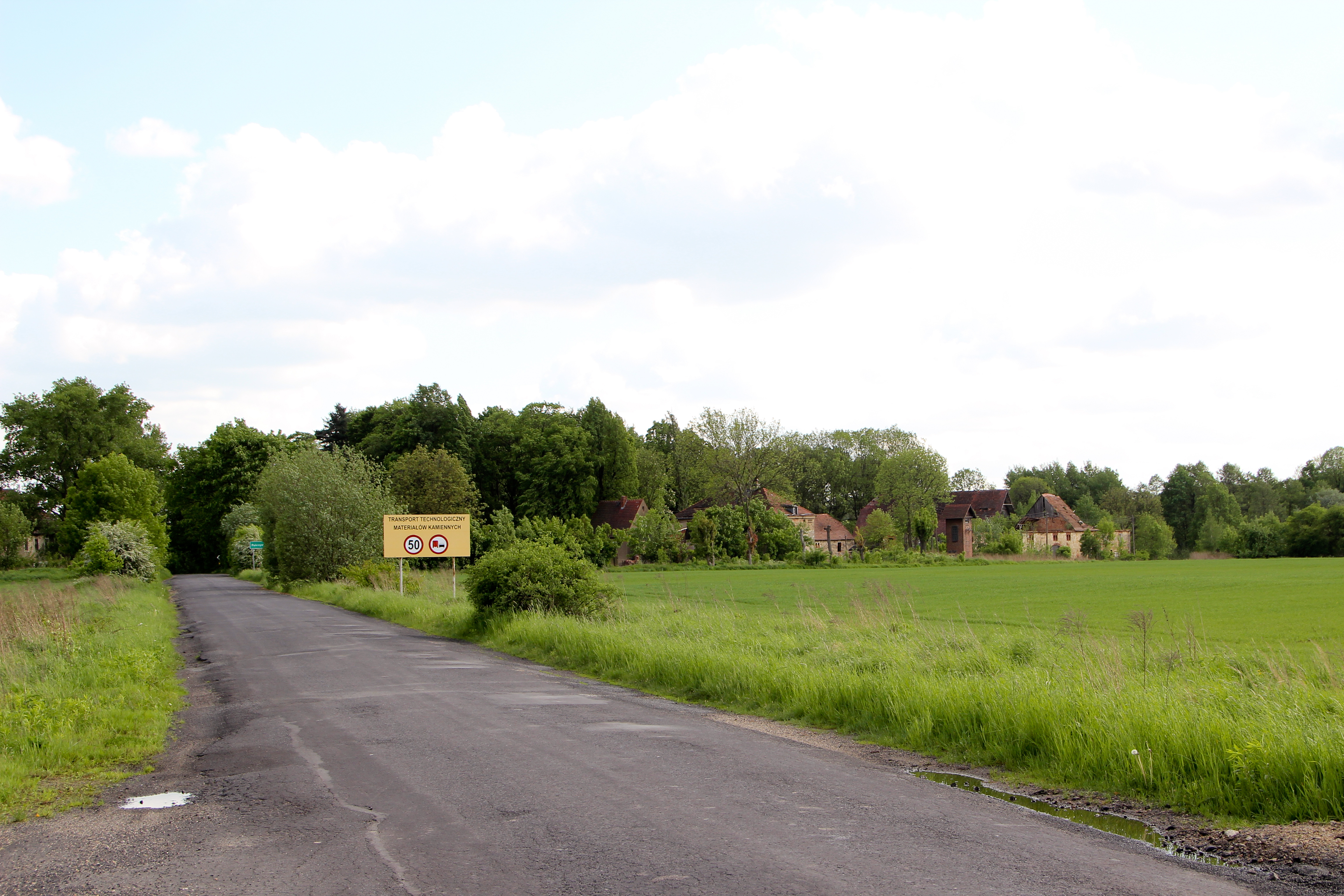
Pokrzywnik (2012)
