= Kunów, Zgorzelec County =

Kunów
- Village
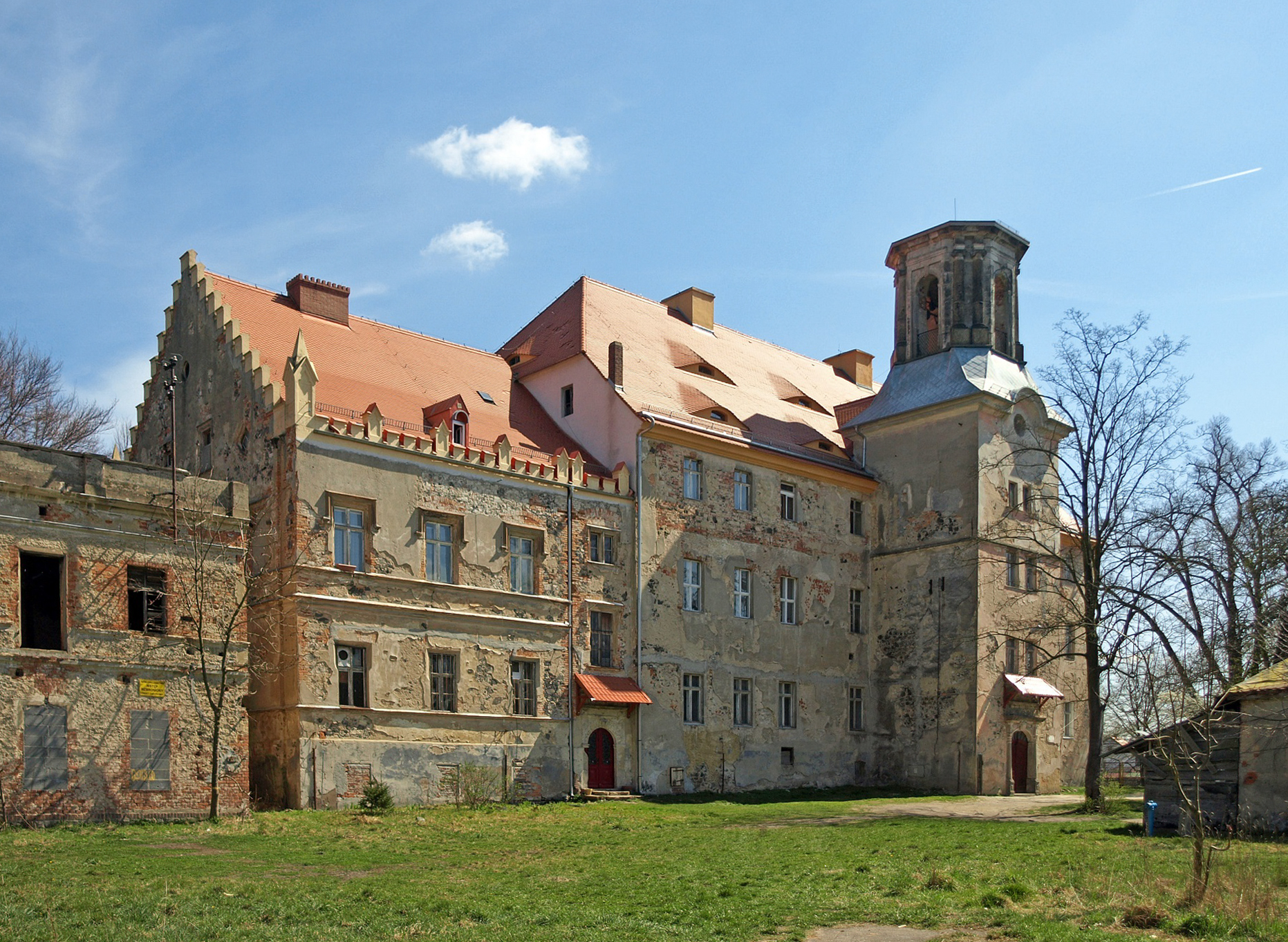
- Castle

- Location within Poland
- Coordinates: 51°6′7″N 15°2′31″E
- Country: Poland
- Voivodeship: Lower Silesian
- County: Zgorzelec
- Gmina: Zgorzelec
- Population: 201

Kunów [ˈkunuf] (Upper Sorbian: Kunow, German: Kuhna) is a village in the administrative district of Gmina Zgorzelec, within Zgorzelec County, Lower Silesian Voivodeship, in south-western Poland, close to the German border.

== Etymology ==
The name is of Slavic origin, and comes from word kuna, which means "marten".
