= Łagów, Lower Silesian Voivodeship =

Łagów
- Village
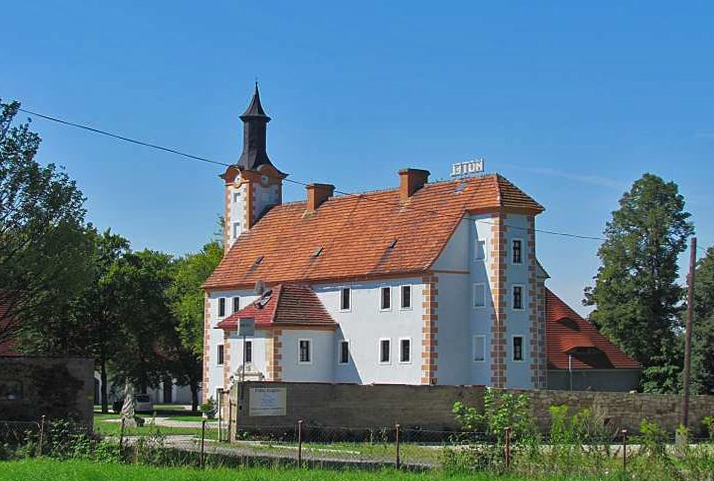
- Łagów Palace from 1782

- Location within Poland
- Coordinates: 51°9′28″N 15°2′37″E
- Country: Poland
- Voivodeship: Lower Silesian
- County: Zgorzelec
- Gmina: Zgorzelec
- Population: 1,236
- Website: http://www.lagow.info

Łagów [ˈwaɡuf] (Upper Sorbian: Łahow) is a village in the administrative district of Gmina Zgorzelec, within Zgorzelec County, Lower Silesian Voivodeship, in south-western Poland, close to the German border.

== Gallery ==
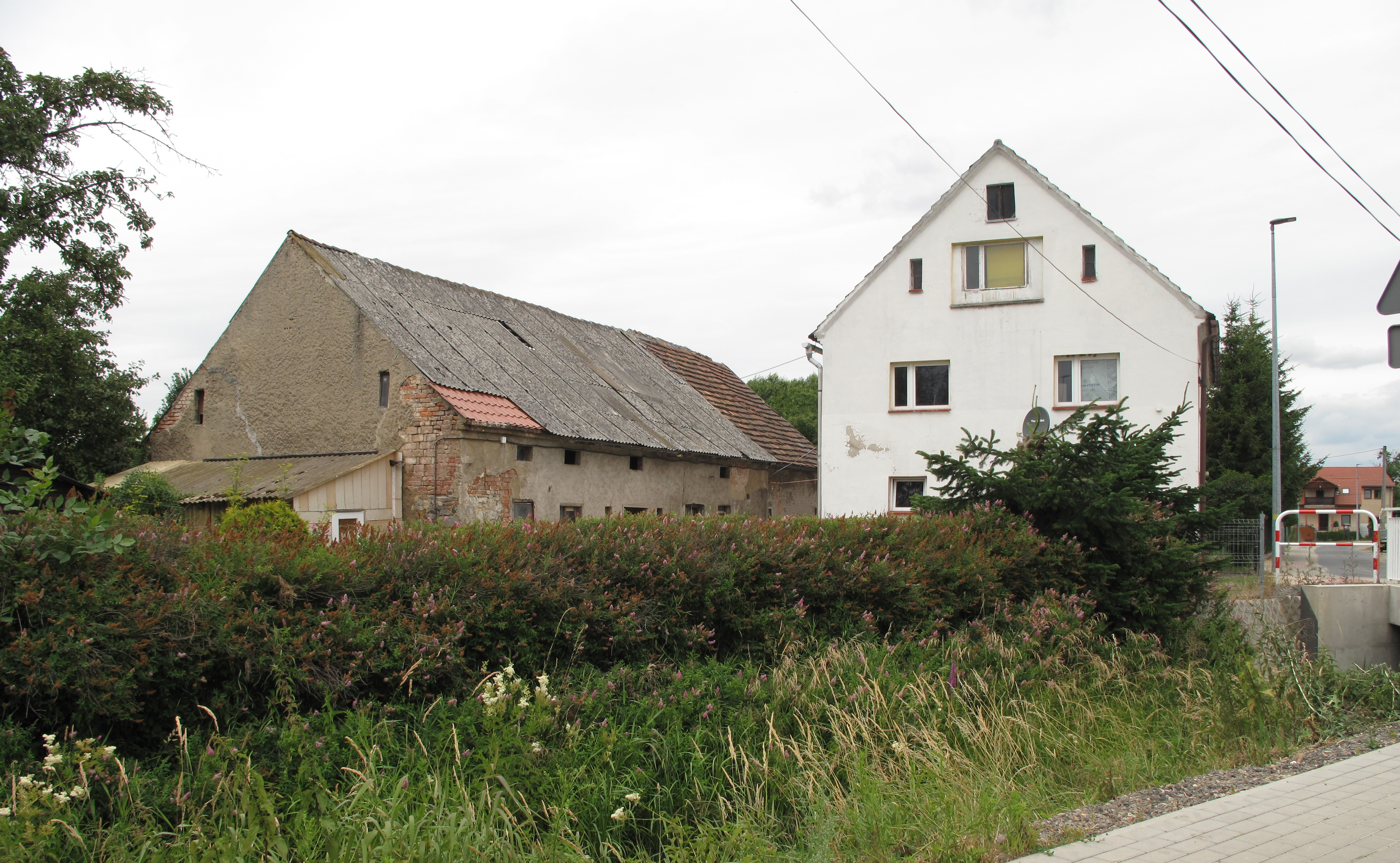
Houses

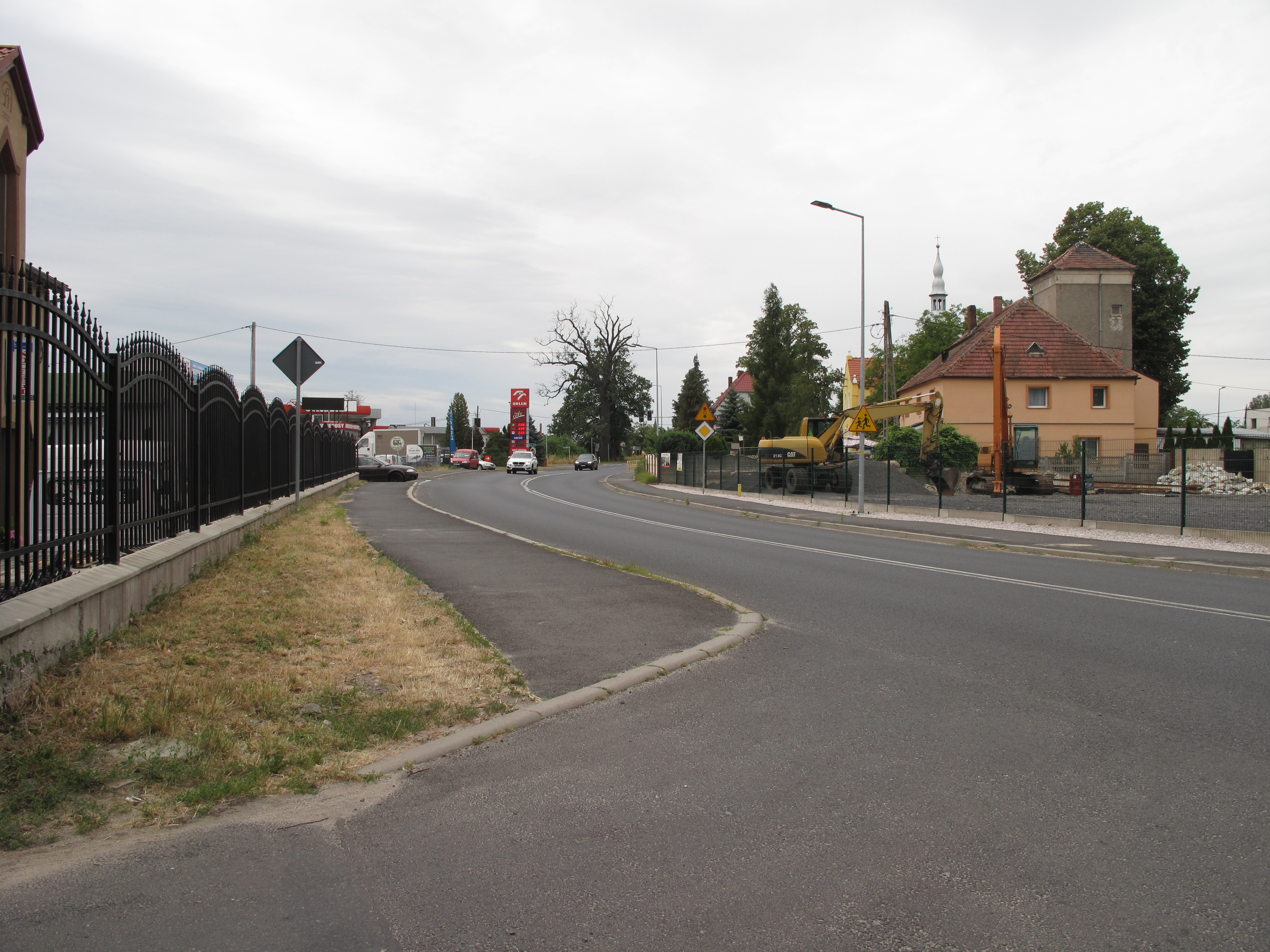
Road

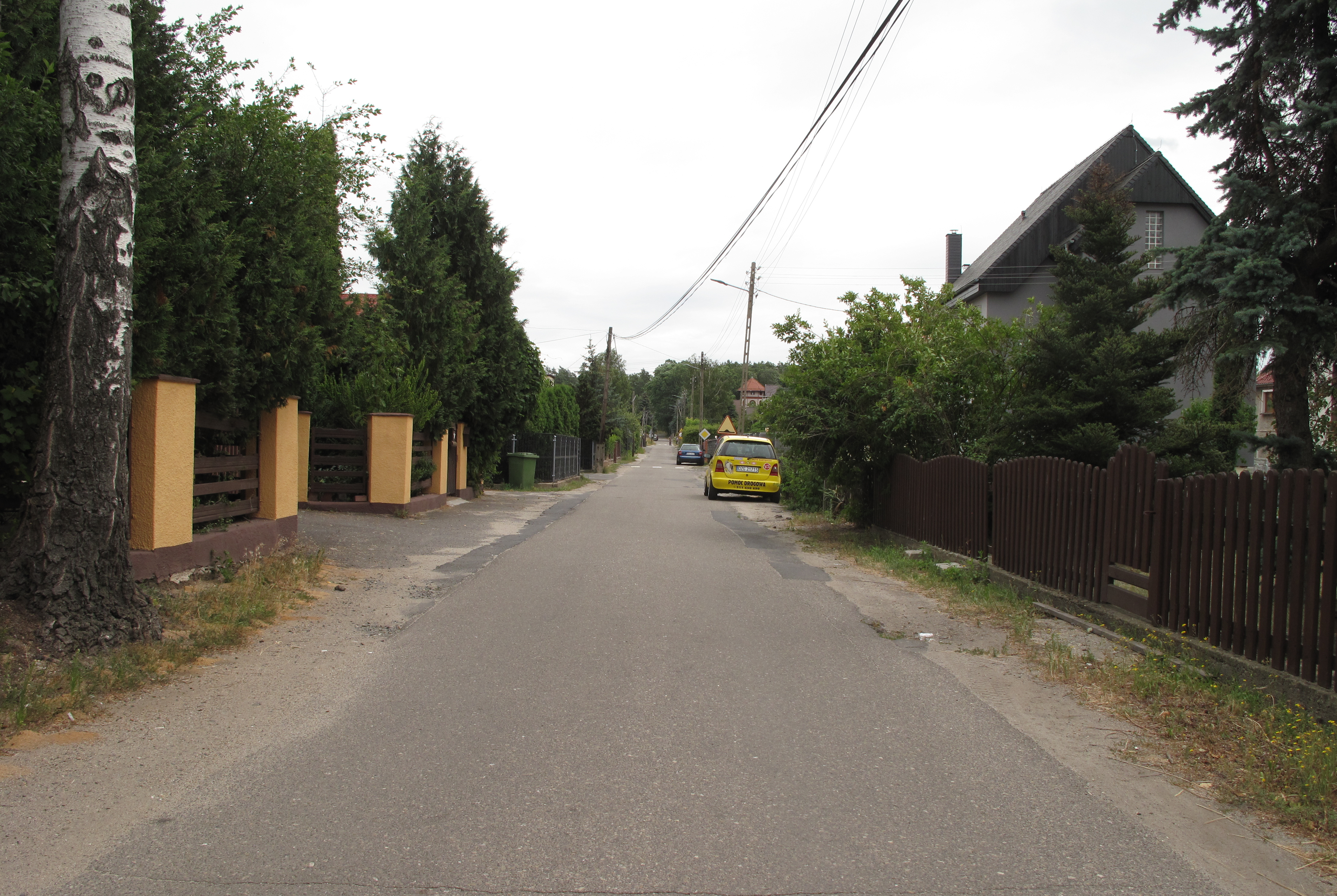
Street

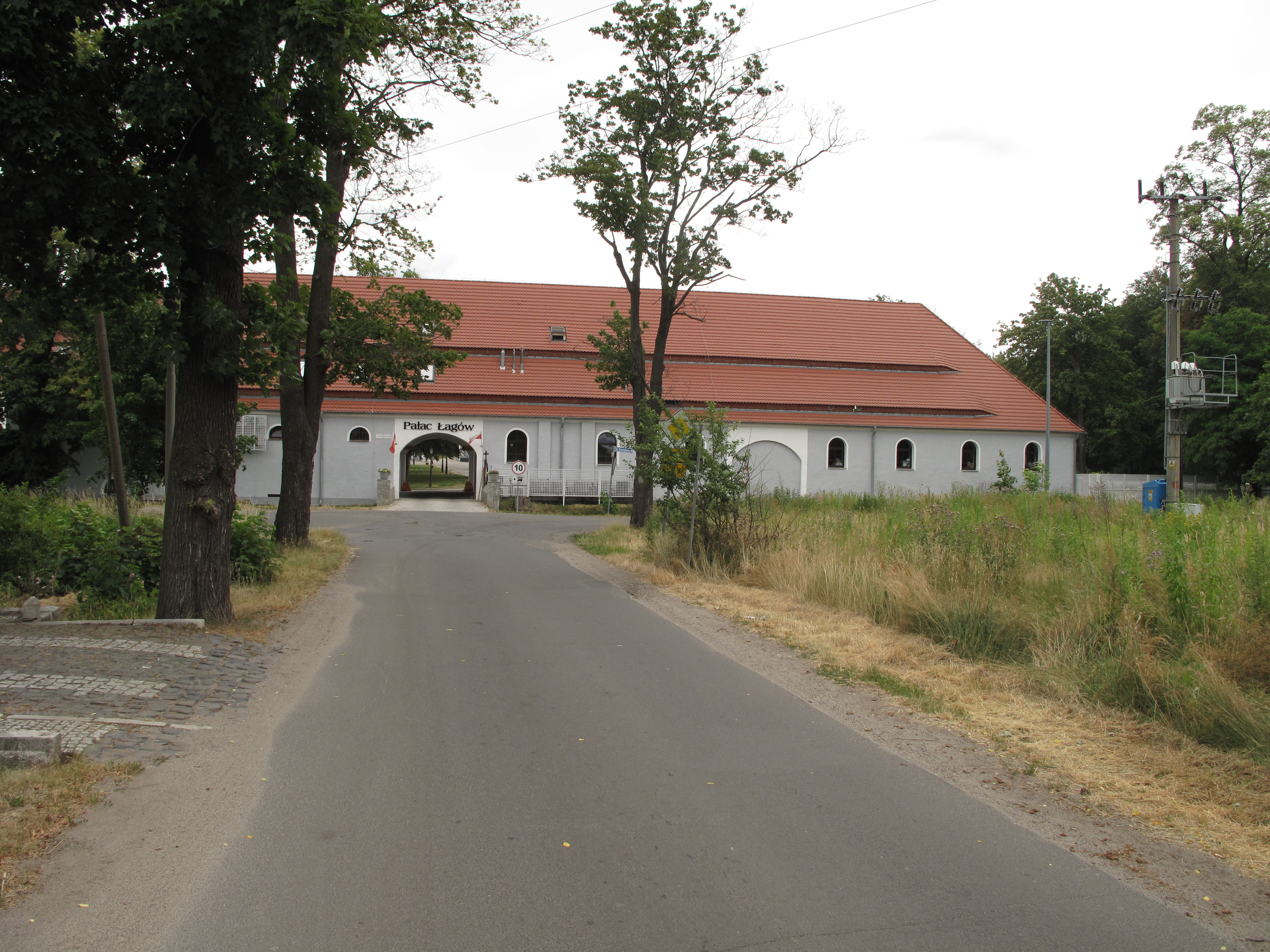
Palace
