= Ręczyn =

- Village
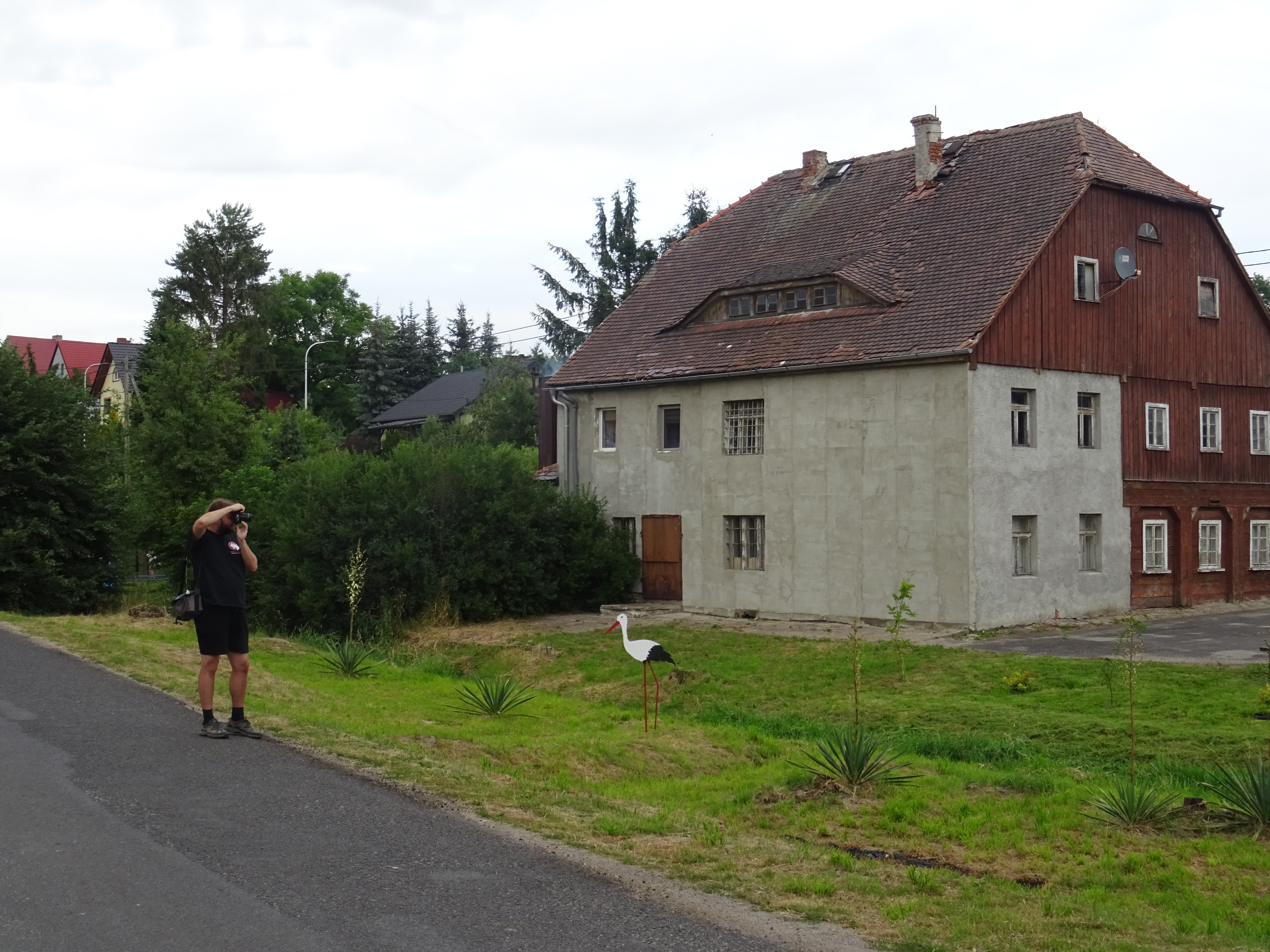
- House by the road

- Location within Poland
- Coordinates: 51°2′N 14°58′E
- Country: Poland
- Voivodeship: Lower Silesian
- County: Zgorzelec
- Gmina: Zgorzelec
- Population: 363

Ręczyn (German: Reutnitz; Upper Sorbian: Rěčyn) is a village in the administrative district of Gmina Zgorzelec, within Zgorzelec County, Lower Silesian Voivodeship, in south-western Poland, close to the German border.

== Gallery ==
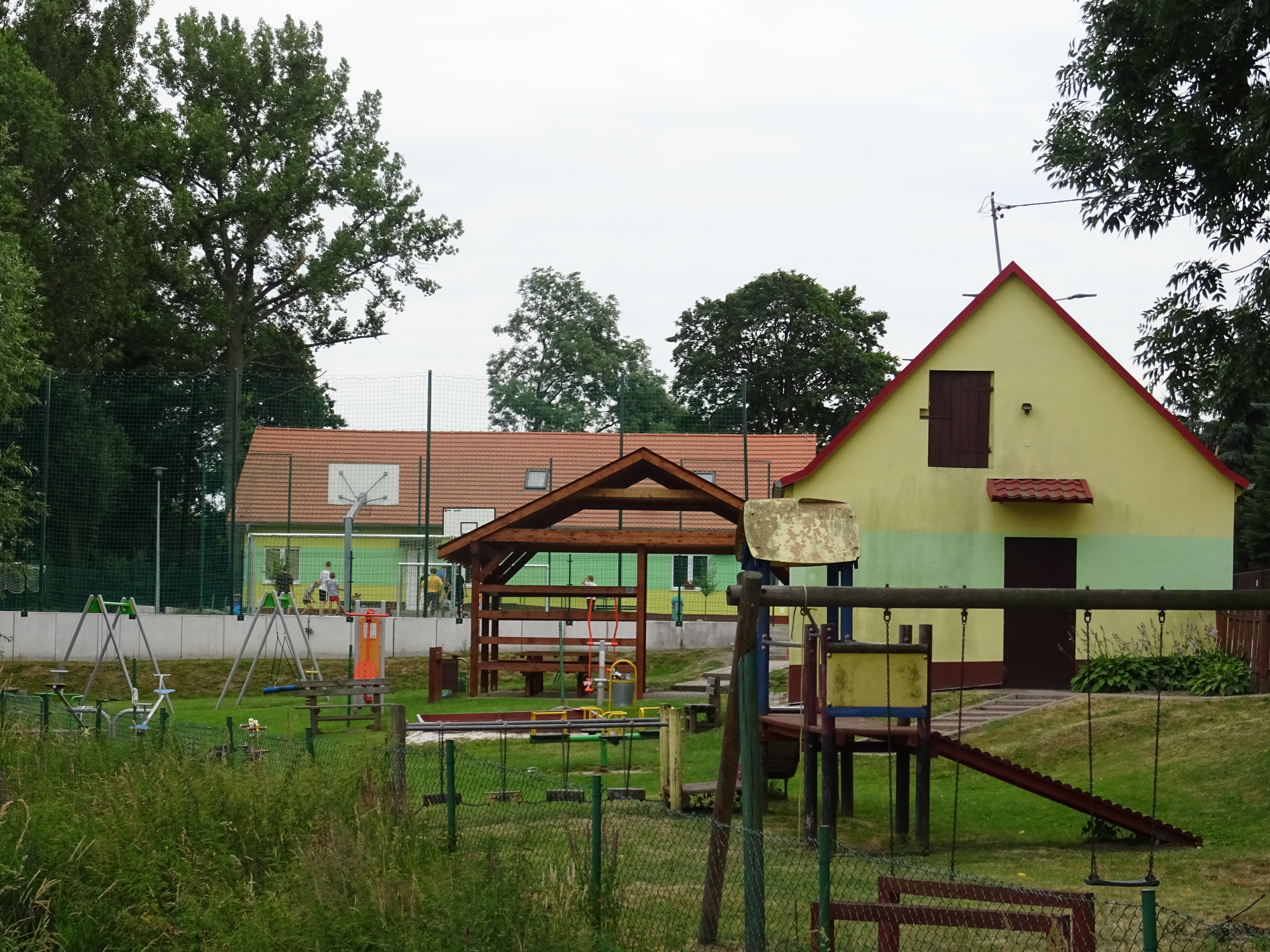
Children playground

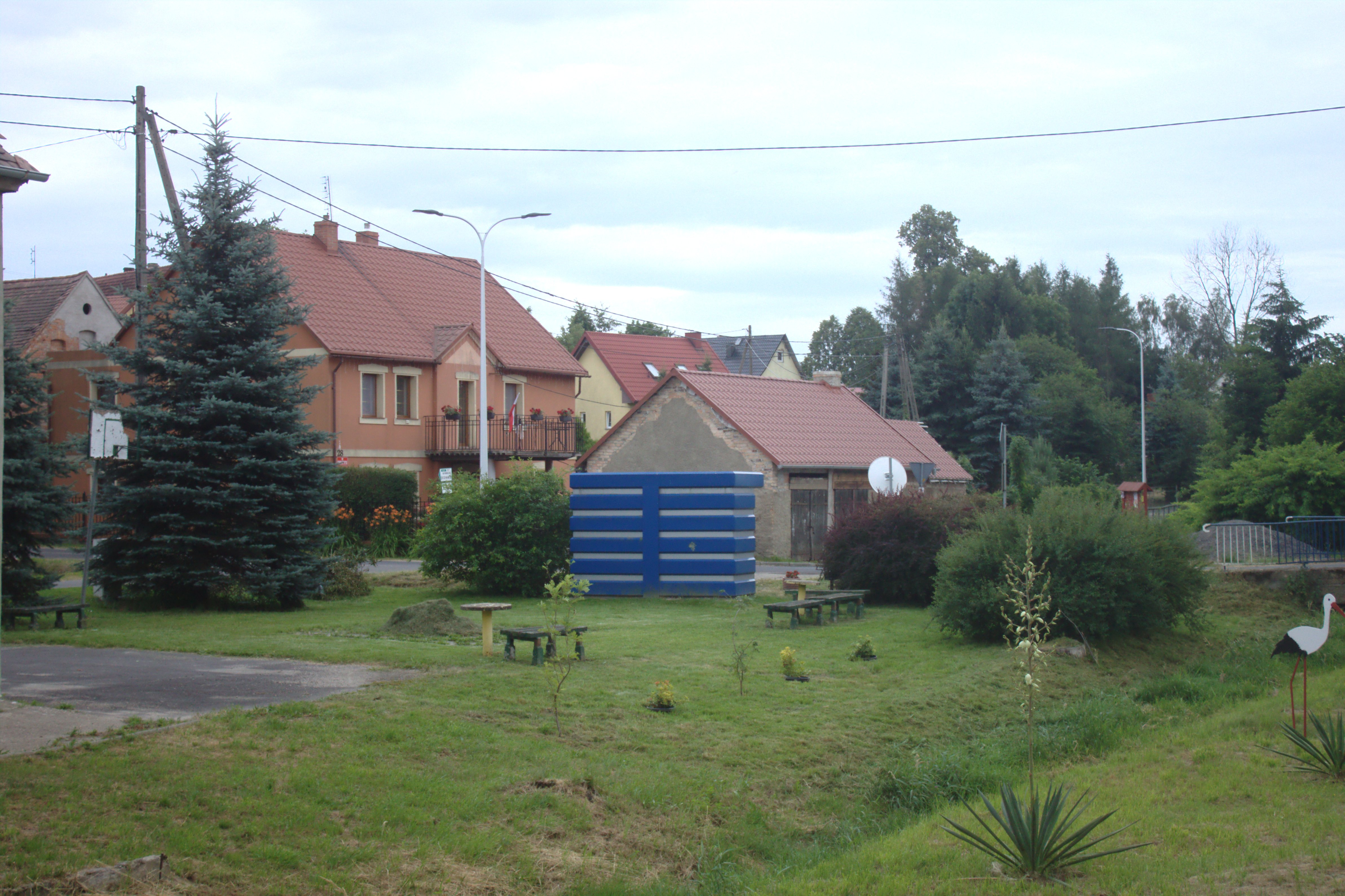
Centre of the village

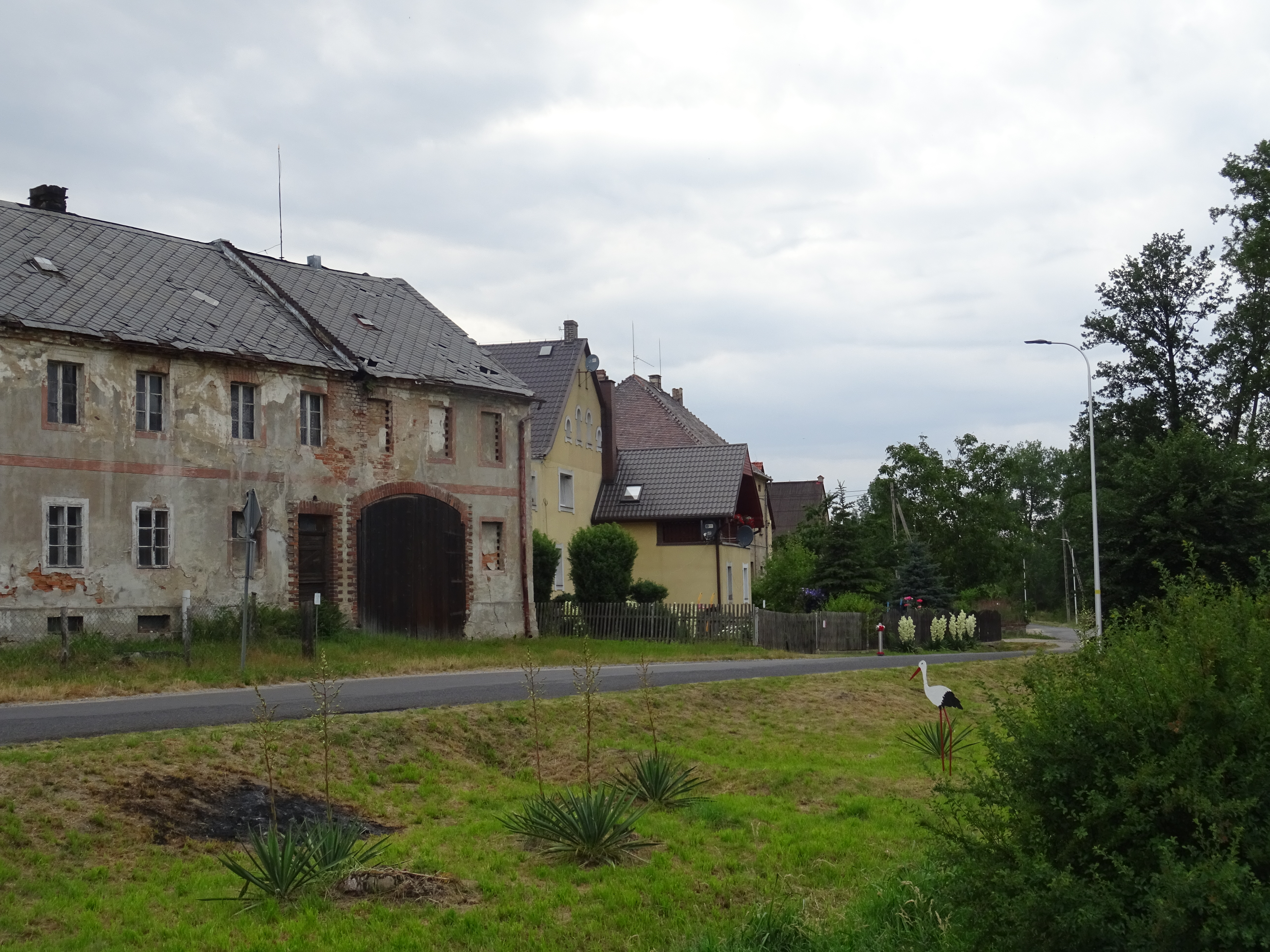
Old houses
