= Kostrzyna, Lower Silesian Voivodeship =

Kostrzyna
- Village
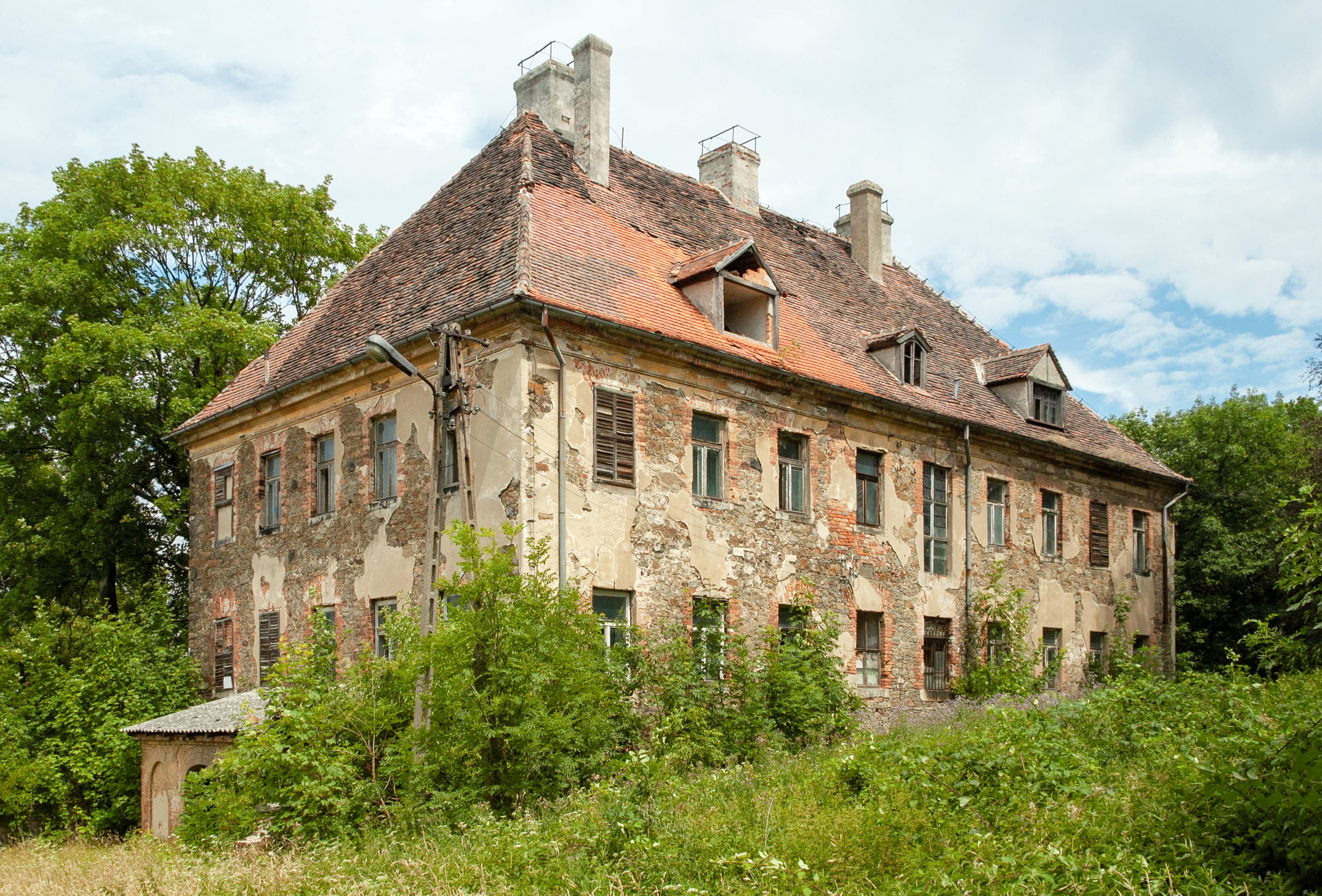
- Old palace

- Location within Poland
- Coordinates: 51°1′10″N 14°59′48″E
- Country: Poland
- Voivodeship: Lower Silesian
- County: Zgorzelec
- Gmina: Zgorzelec
- Population: 157

Kostrzyna [kɔsˈtʂɨna] (German: Trattlau) is a village in the administrative district of Gmina Zgorzelec, within Zgorzelec County, Lower Silesian Voivodeship, in south-western Poland, close to the German border.

== Gallery ==
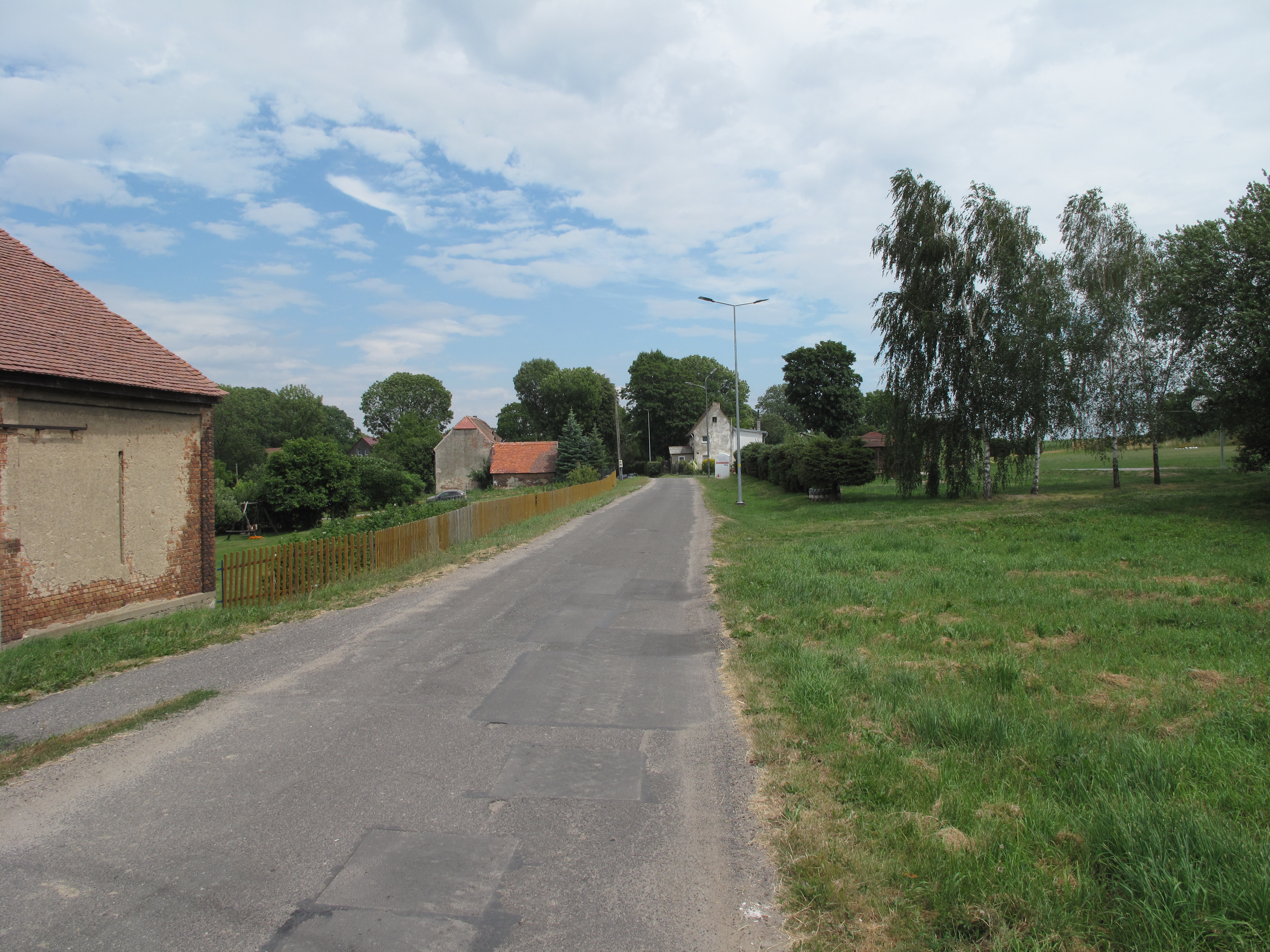
Road

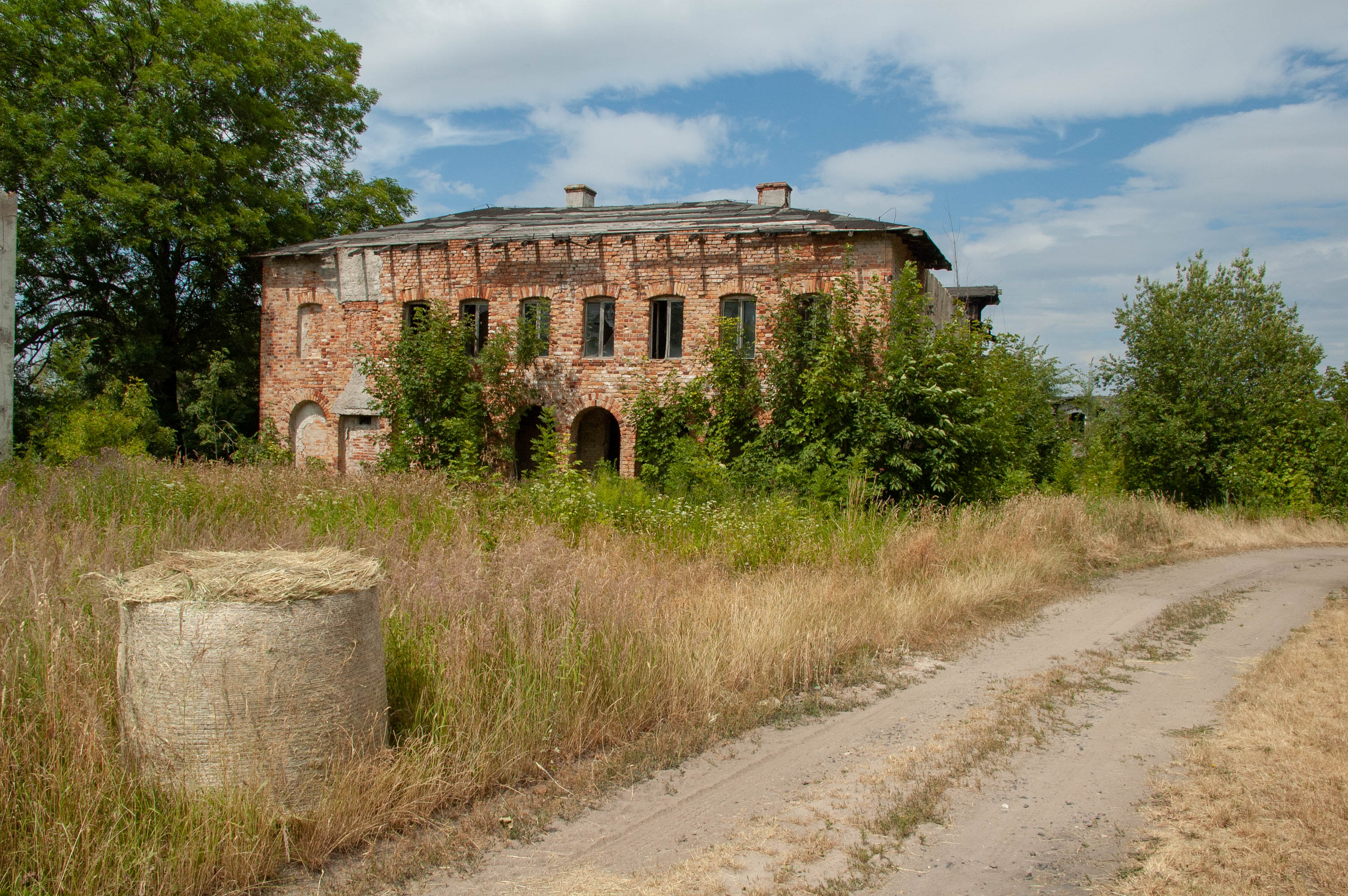
Abandonrd buildings of a palace

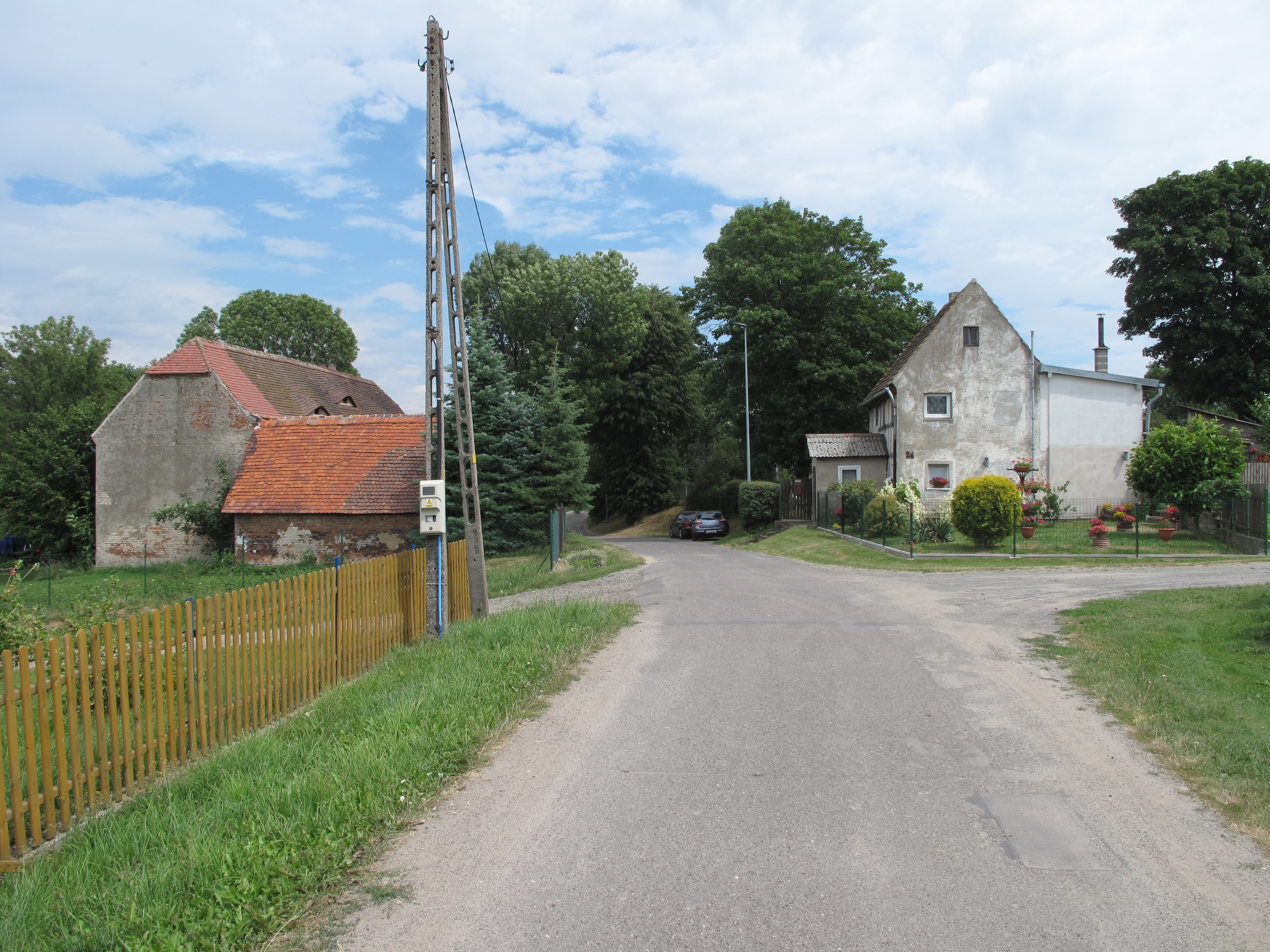
Road
