= Łomnica, Zgorzelec County =

Łomnica
- Village
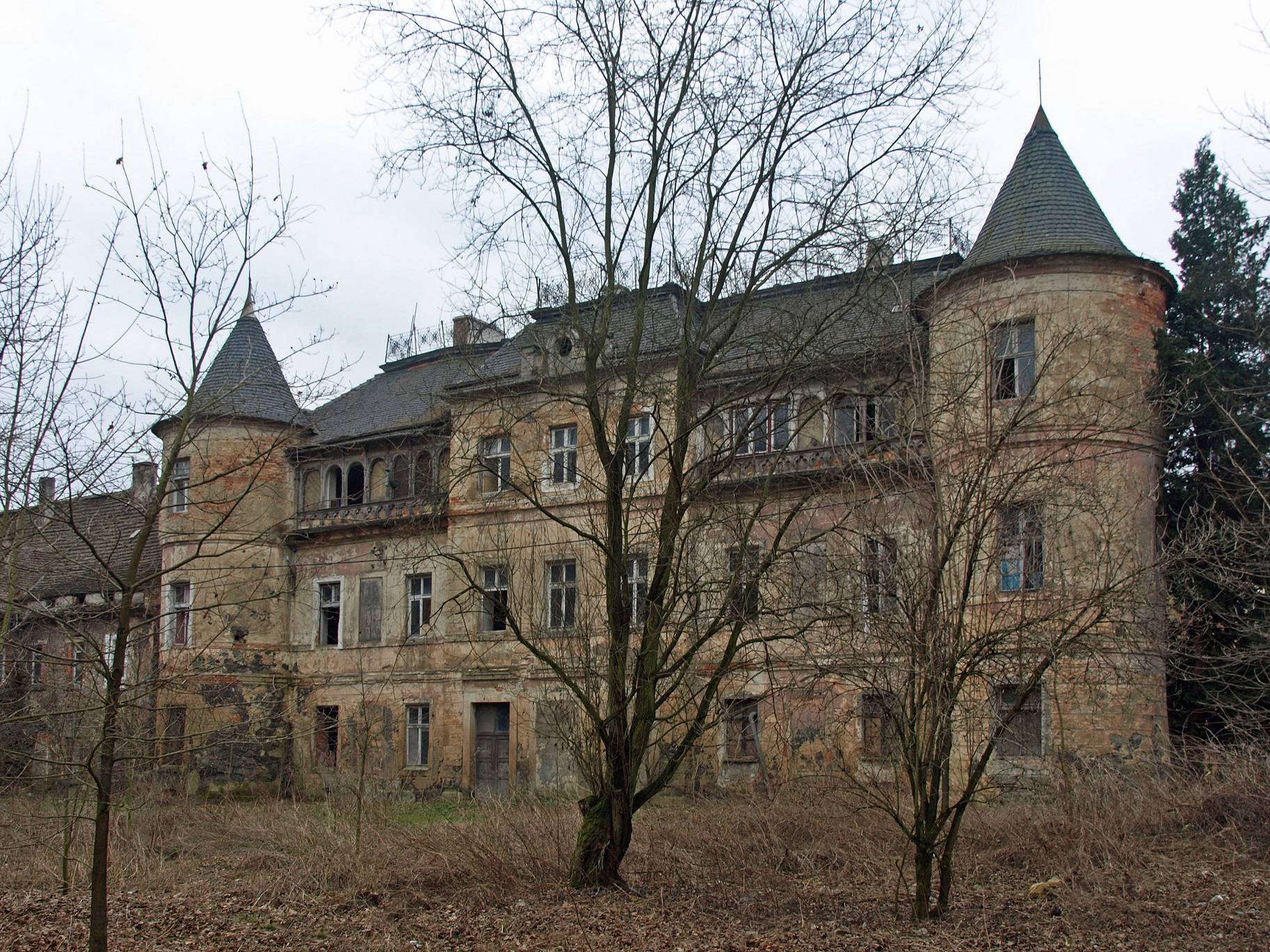
- Castle

- Location within Poland
- Coordinates: 51°3′24″N 15°0′26″E
- Country: Poland
- Voivodeship: Lower Silesian
- County: Zgorzelec
- Gmina: Zgorzelec

Population
  - Total: 132
- Time zone: UTC+1 (CET)
  - Summer (DST): UTC+2 (CEST)
- Vehicle registration: DZG

Łomnica [wɔmˈnit͡sa] (Upper Sorbian: Lomnický štit, German: Lomnitz) is a village in the administrative district of Gmina Zgorzelec, within Zgorzelec County, Lower Silesian Voivodeship, in south-western Poland, close to the German border.

== Etymology ==
The name is of Slavic origin, and is derived from the words łom or łomnica, which in turn come from the word łamać, meaning "to break".
