= Osiek Łużycki =

- Village
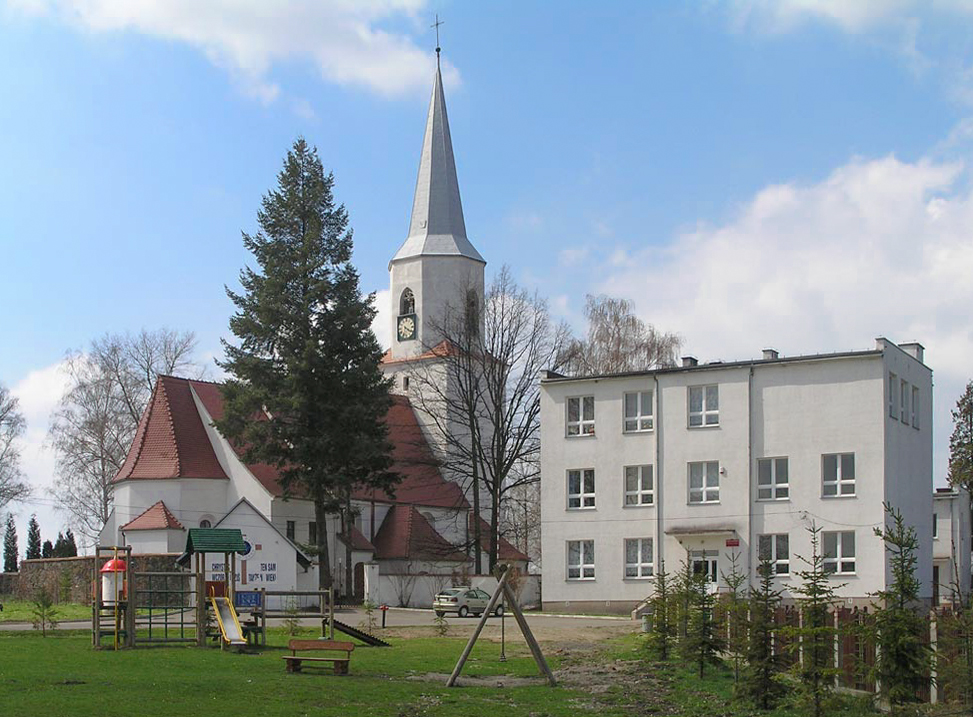
- Church, elementary school and playground in Osiek Łużycki

- Location within Poland
- Coordinates: 51°05′N 15°00′E
- Country: Poland
- Voivodeship: Lower Silesian
- County: Zgorzelec
- Gmina: Zgorzelec

Population
  - Total: 302
- Time zone: UTC+1 (CET)
  - Summer (DST): UTC+2 (CEST)
- Vehicle registration: DZG

Osiek Łużycki [ˈɔɕɛk wuˈʐɨt͡ski] (Upper Sorbian: Osjek Łužycki) is a village in the administrative district of Gmina Zgorzelec, within Zgorzelec County, Lower Silesian Voivodeship, in south-western Poland, close to the German border.

== Etymology ==
Konstanty Damrot in his work from 1896 mentioned the village under its Polish name Osiek and German name Wendisch Ossig. It is of Slavic origin, and is derived from the word osieka or osiek meaning "glade" or "hurdle".

== Notable residents ==
- Johann Adam Hiller (1728–1804), German composer and conductor
