= Koźlice, Zgorzelec County =

Koźlice
- Village
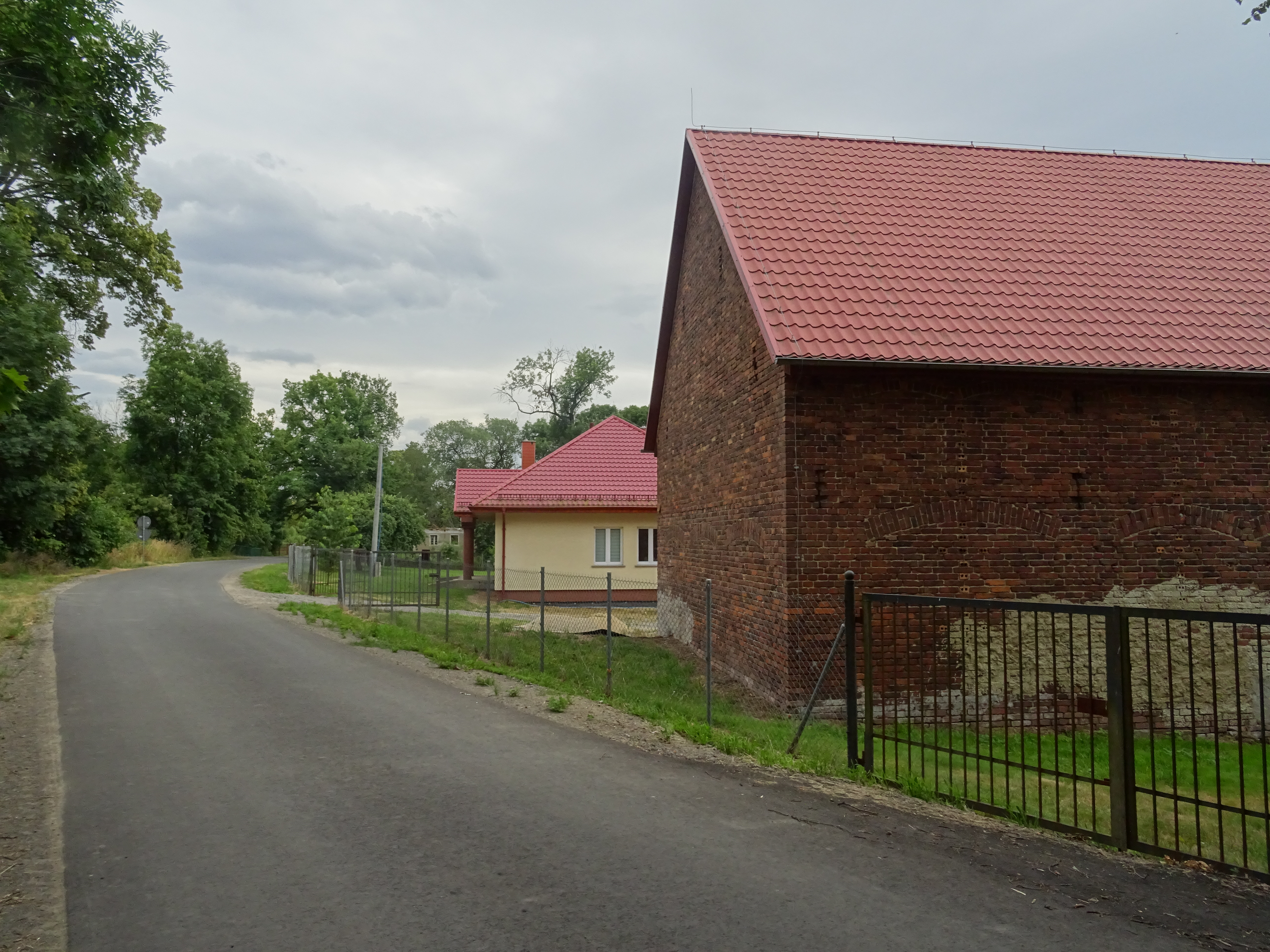

- Location within Poland
- Coordinates: 51°6′17″N 14°59′14″E
- Country: Poland
- Voivodeship: Lower Silesian
- County: Zgorzelec
- Gmina: Zgorzelec

Population
  - Total: 208
- Time zone: UTC+1 (CET)
  - Summer (DST): UTC+2 (CEST)
- Vehicle registration: DZG

Koźlice [kɔˈʑlit͡sɛ] (Upper Sorbian: Kožlici; German: Köslitz) is a village in the administrative district of Gmina Zgorzelec, within Zgorzelec County, Lower Silesian Voivodeship, in south-western Poland, close to the German border.

== Etymology ==
The name is of Slavic origin, and comes from word kozioł, which means "goat".
