= Żarska Wieś =

- Village
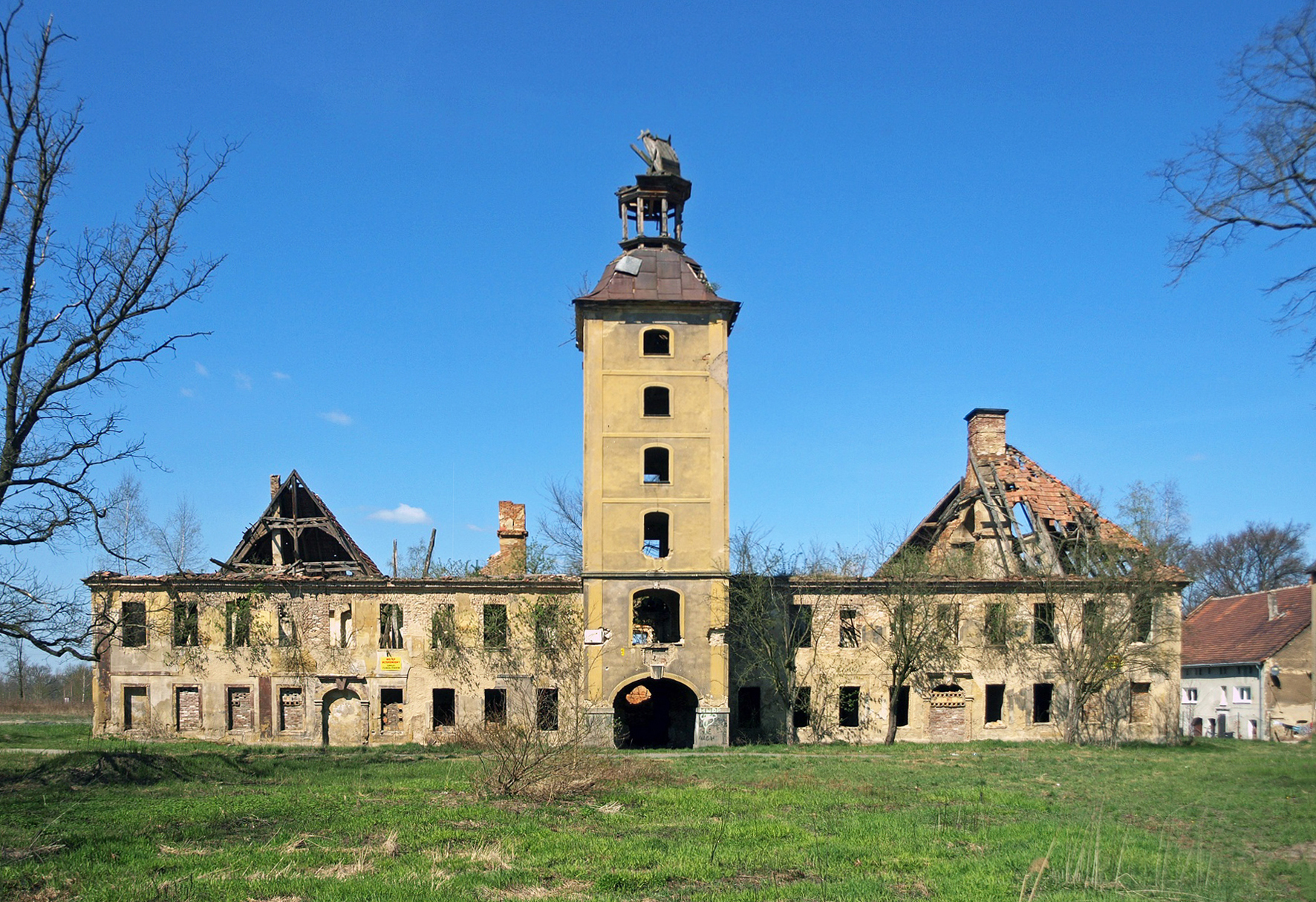
- Castle

- Location within Poland
- Coordinates: 51°11′38″N 15°6′15″E
- Country: Poland
- Voivodeship: Lower Silesian
- County: Zgorzelec
- Gmina: Zgorzelec
- Population (2009): 846

Żarska Wieś [ˈʐarska ˈvjɛɕ] (Upper Sorbian: Žarška Wjes) is a village in the administrative district of Gmina Zgorzelec, within Zgorzelec County, Lower Silesian Voivodeship, in south-western Poland, close to the German border.
