= Trójca =

Trójca may refer to the following places in Poland:

- Trójca, Lower Silesian Voivodeship (south-west Poland)
- Trójca, Subcarpathian Voivodeship (south-east Poland)
