= Niedów =

- Village
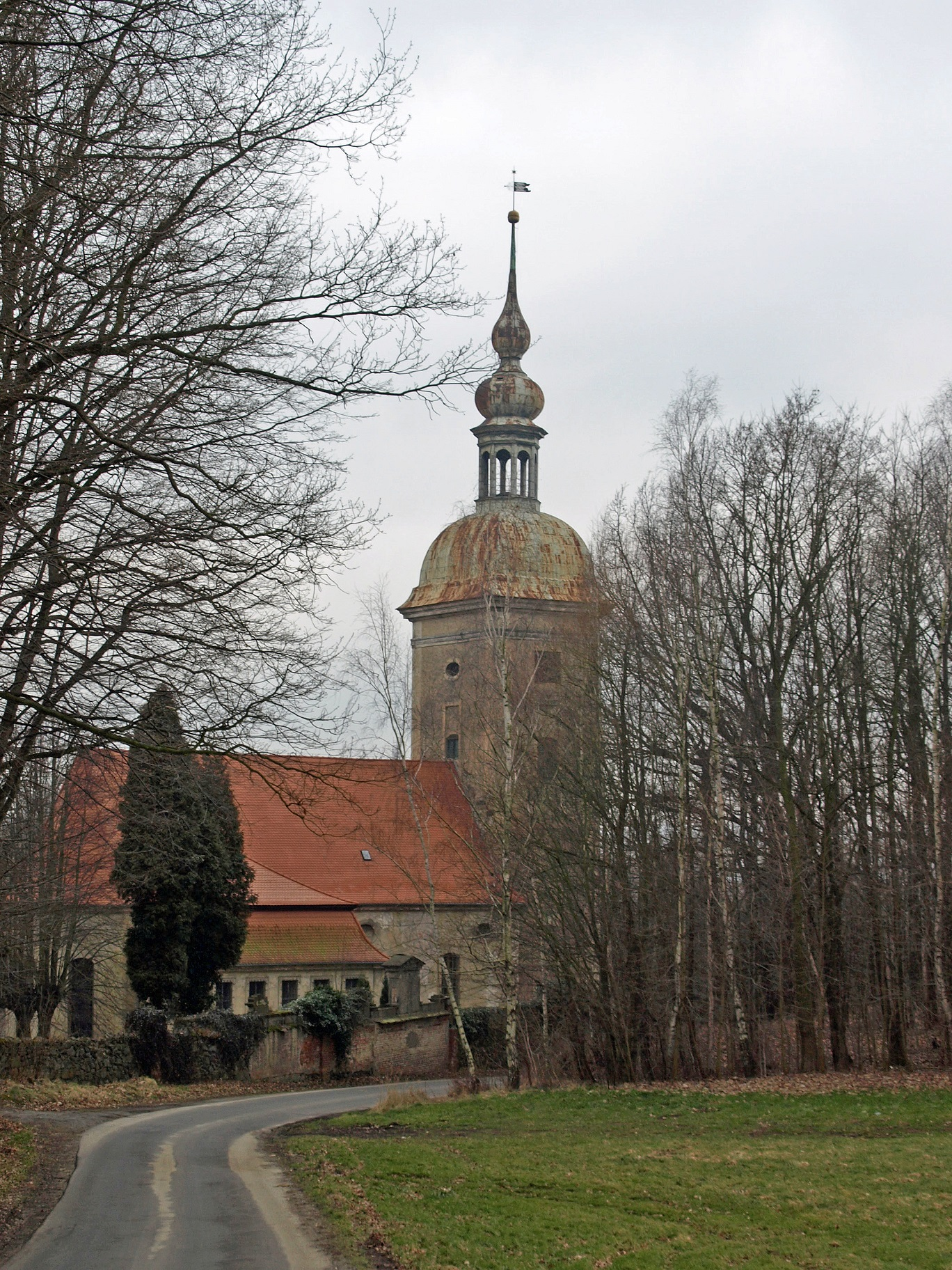
- Church

- Location within Poland
- Coordinates: 51°02′21″N 14°59′11″E
- Country: Poland
- Voivodeship: Lower Silesian
- County: Zgorzelec
- Gmina: Zgorzelec
- Population: 16

Niedów [ˈɲɛduf] (Upper Sorbian: Njedow) is a village in the administrative district of Gmina Zgorzelec, within Zgorzelec County, Lower Silesian Voivodeship, in south-western Poland, close to the German border.

== Gallery ==
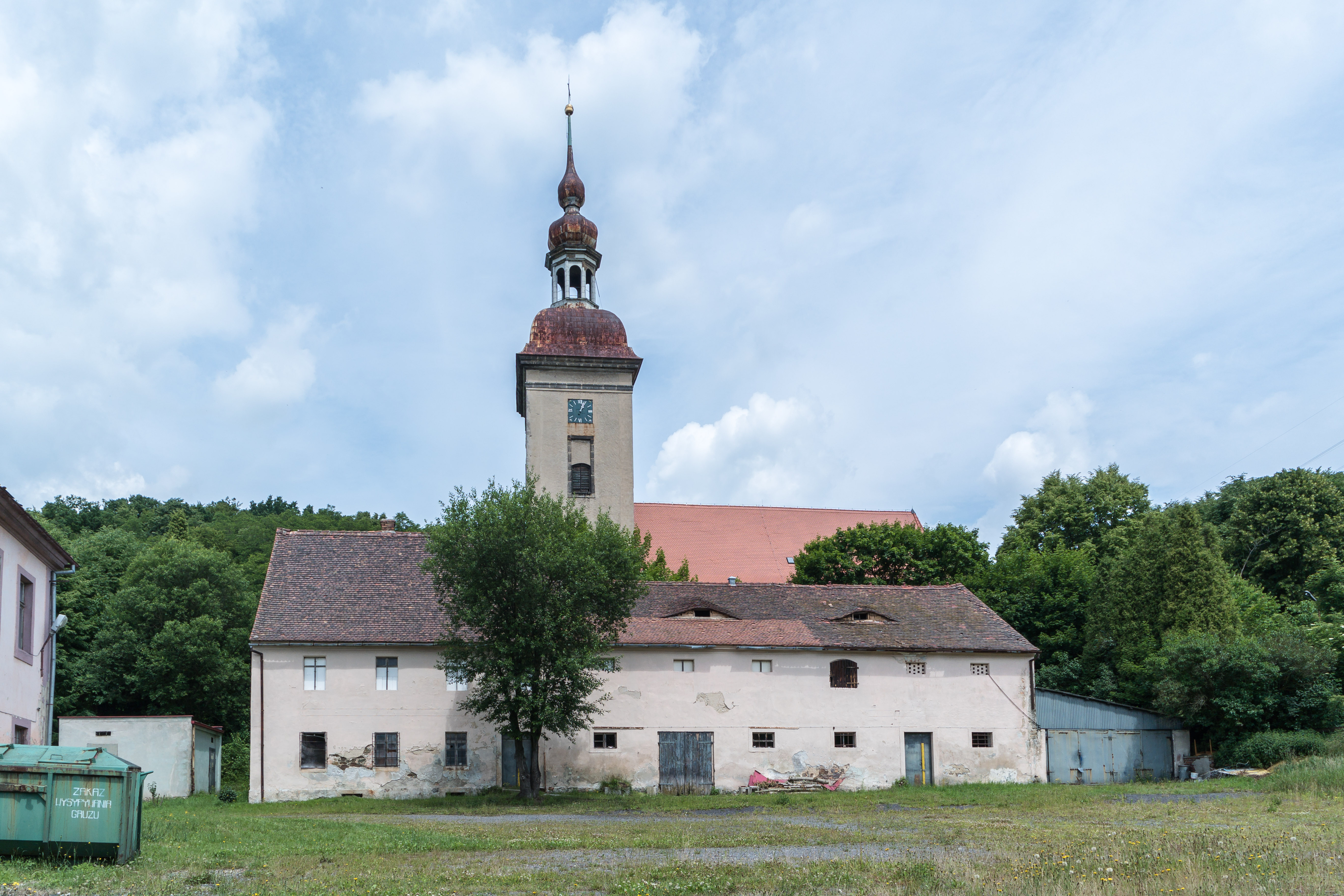
Church from the other side

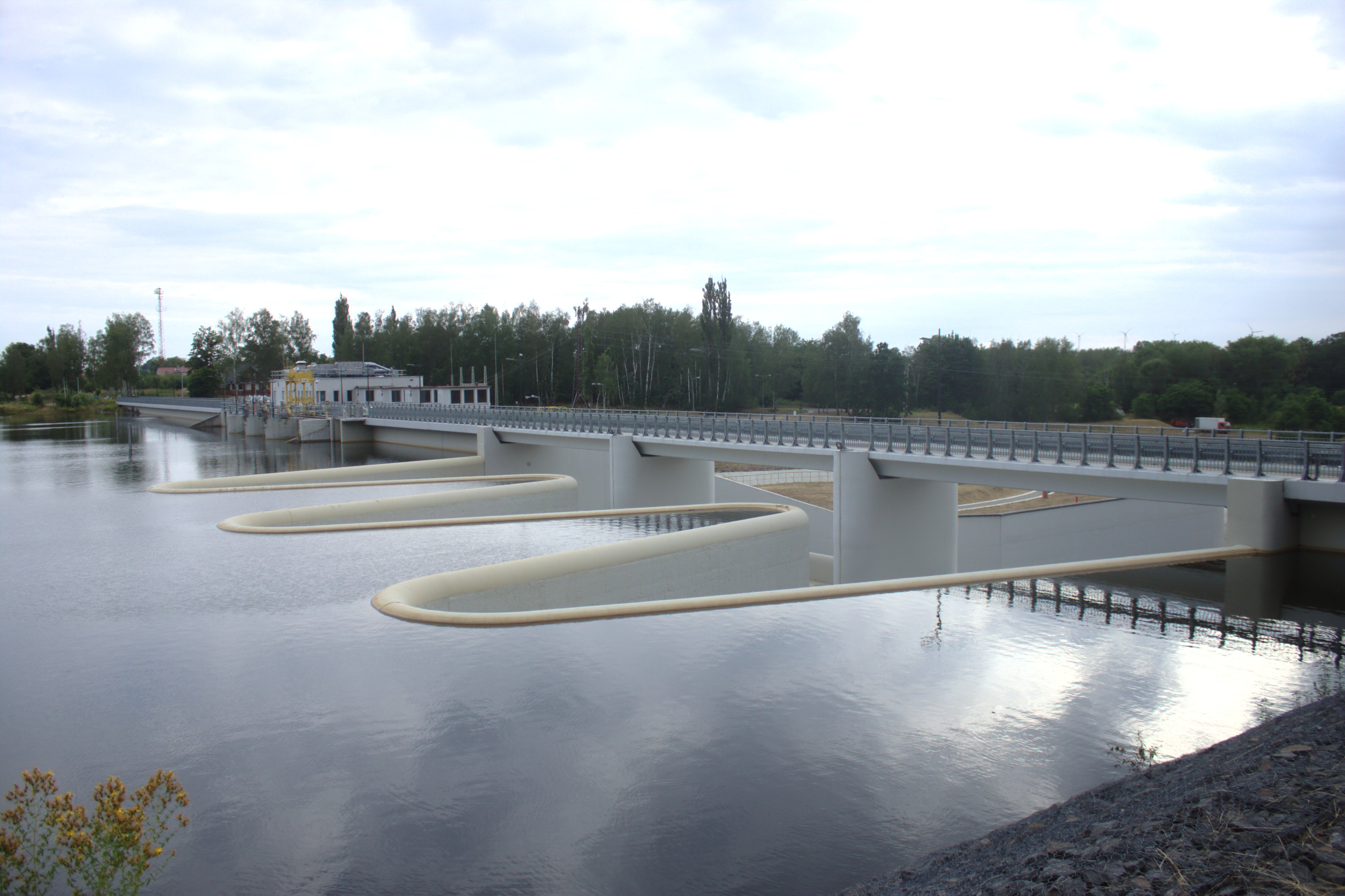
Dam

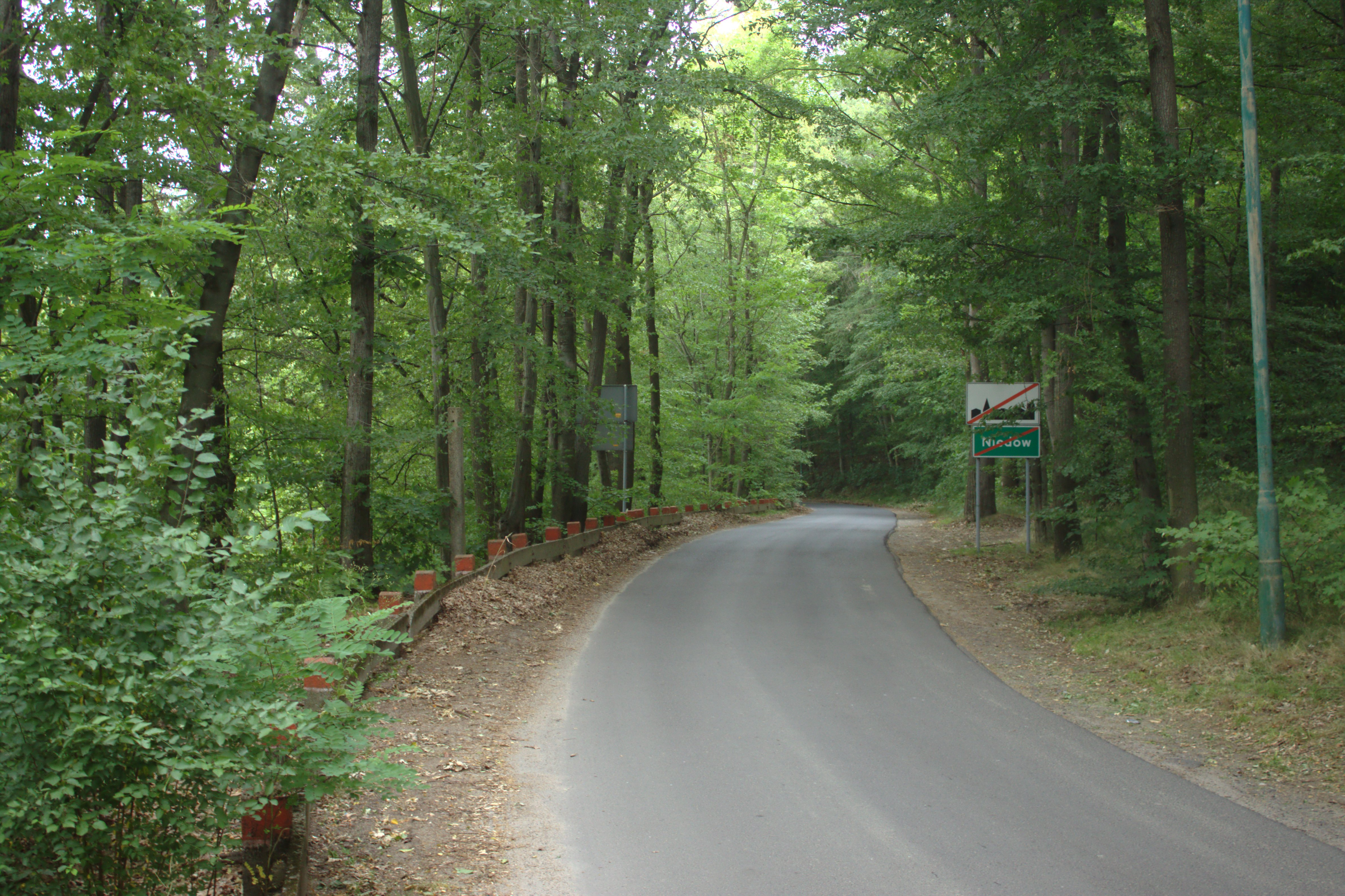
Road from the village

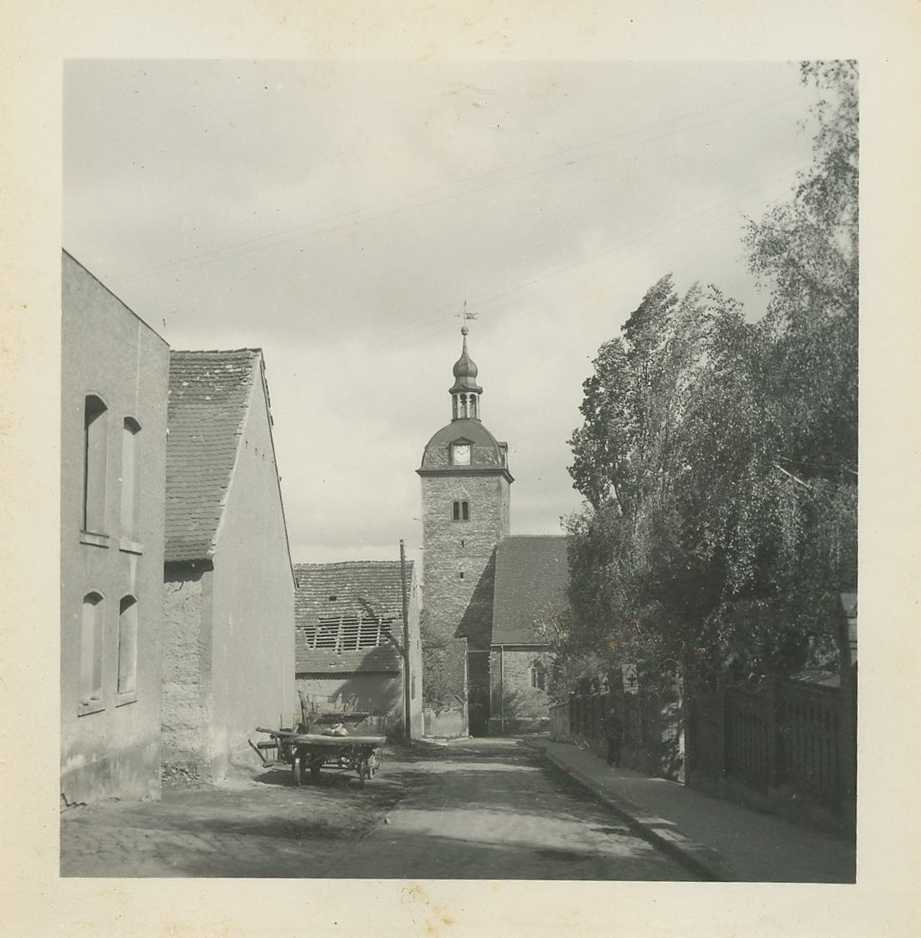
Niedów, Poland, circa 1940s
