= Spytków =

- Village
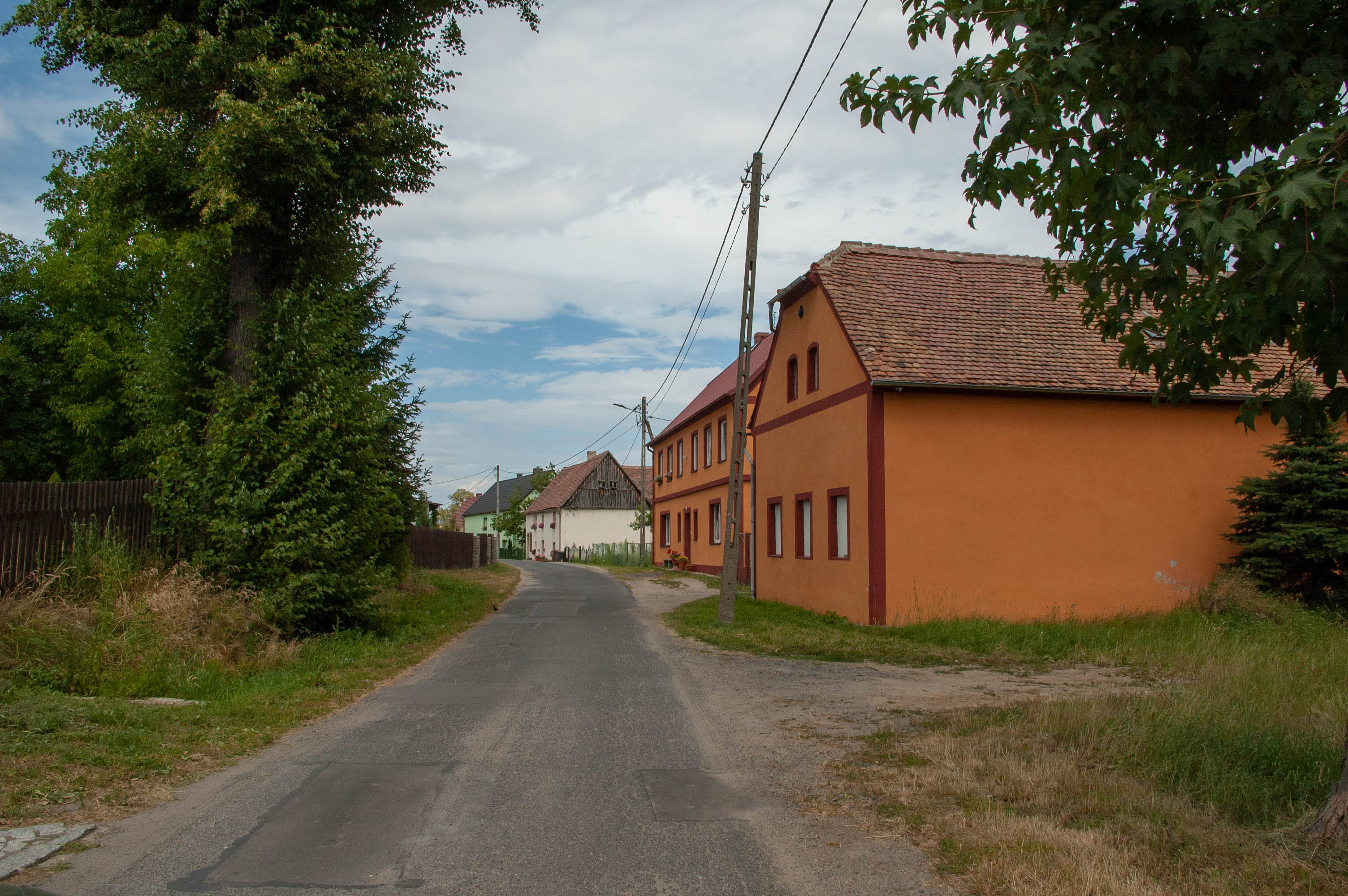
- Street with houses

- Location within Poland
- Coordinates: 51°1′52.2″N 14°59′58.9″E
- Country: Poland
- Voivodeship: Lower Silesian
- County: Zgorzelec
- Gmina: Zgorzelec
- Population: 112

Spytków [ˈspɨtkuf] is a village in the administrative district of Gmina Zgorzelec, within Zgorzelec County, Lower Silesian Voivodeship, in south-western Poland, close to the German border.

== Gallery ==
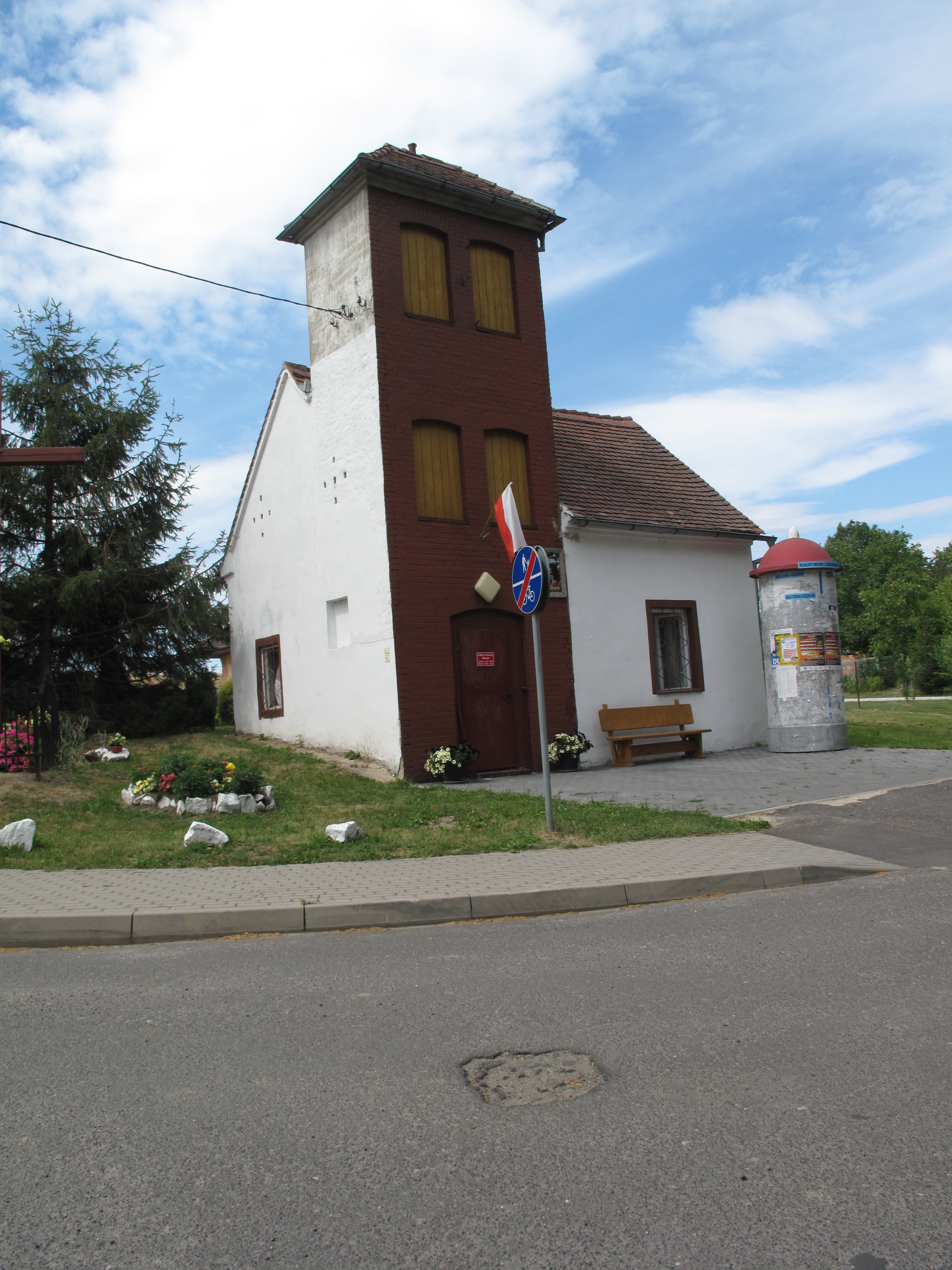
Fire station

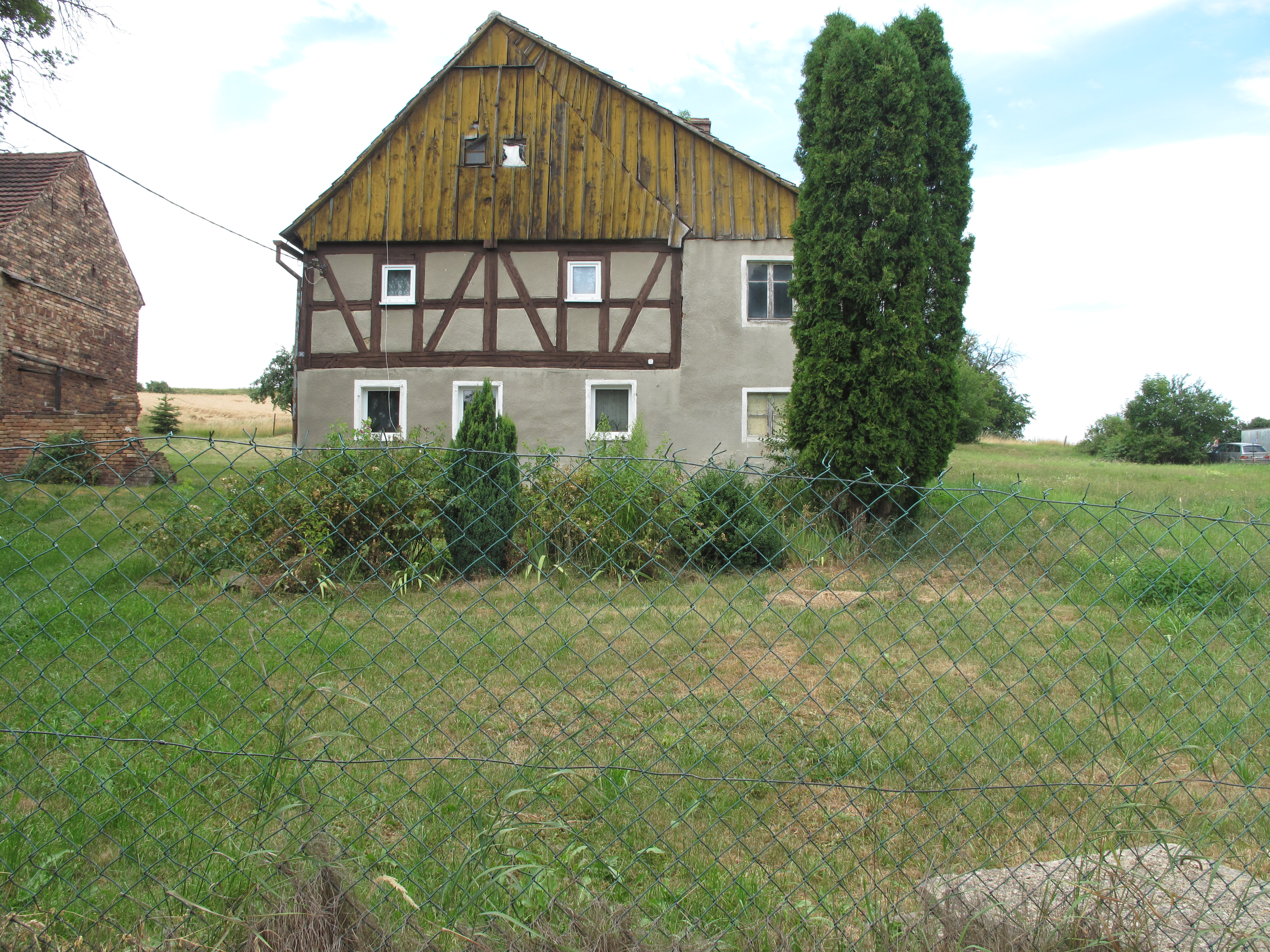
Half-timbered house

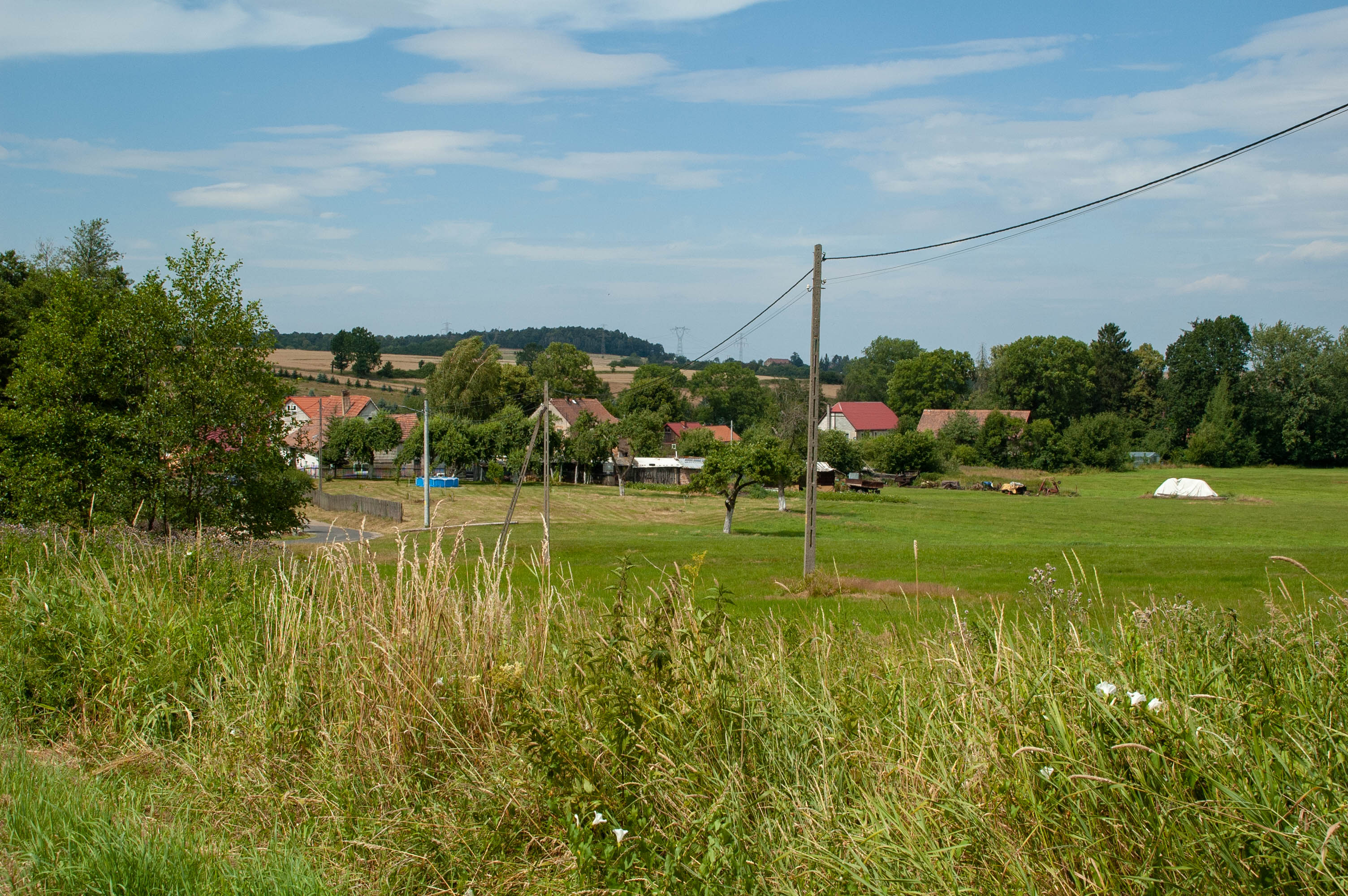
Village from the hill
