= Białogórze =

- Village
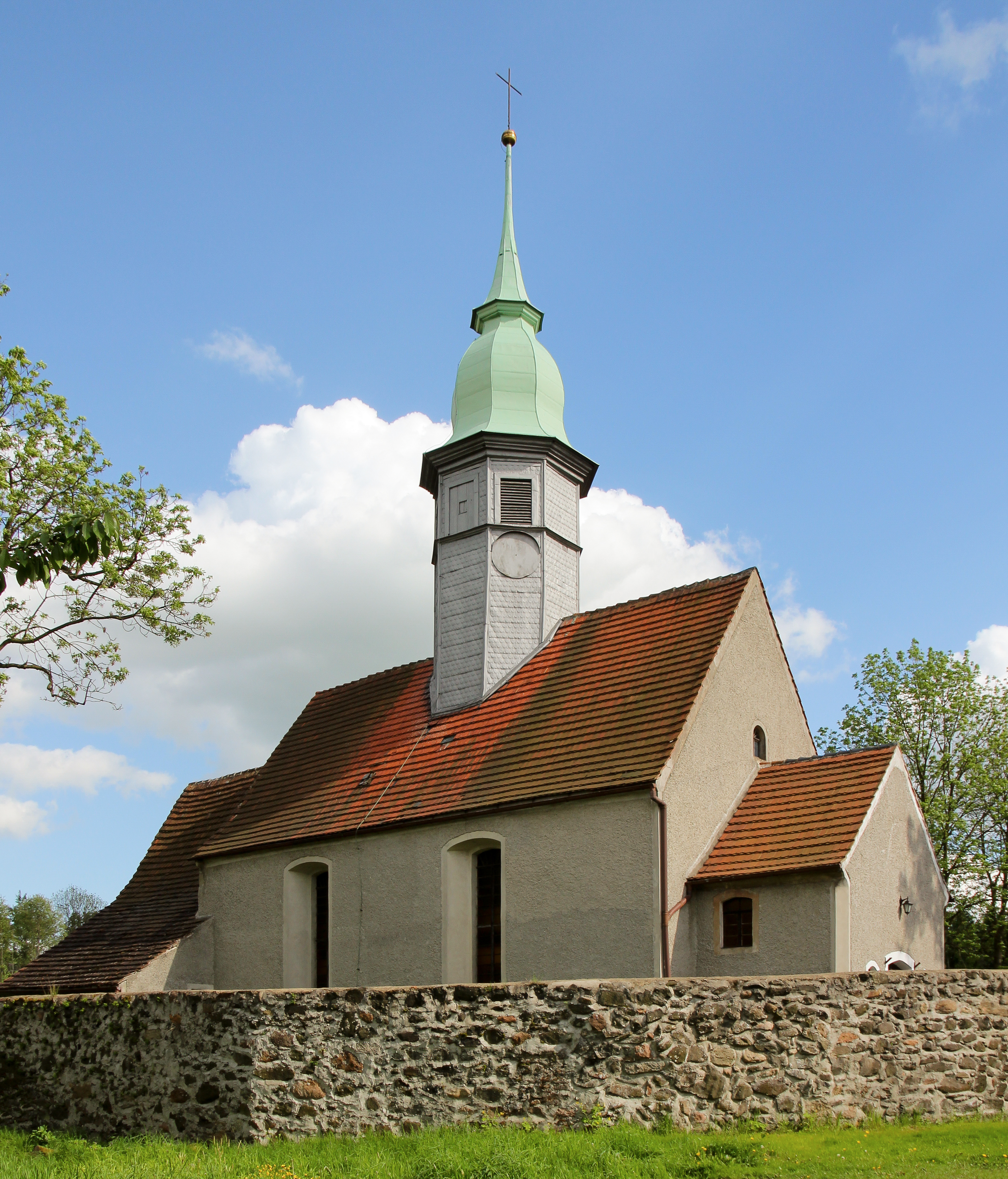
- Saint Andrew Bobola church in Białogórze

- Location within Poland
- Coordinates: 51°9′N 15°8′E
- Country: Poland
- Voivodeship: Lower Silesian
- County: Zgorzelec
- Gmina: Zgorzelec

Population
  - Total: 216
- Time zone: UTC+1 (CET)
  - Summer (DST): UTC+2 (CEST)
- Vehicle registration: DZG

Białogórze [bjawɔˈɡuʐɛ] is a village in the administrative district of Gmina Zgorzelec, within Zgorzelec County, Lower Silesian Voivodeship, in south-western Poland, close to the German border.
