= Gronów, Lower Silesian Voivodeship =

Gronów
- Village
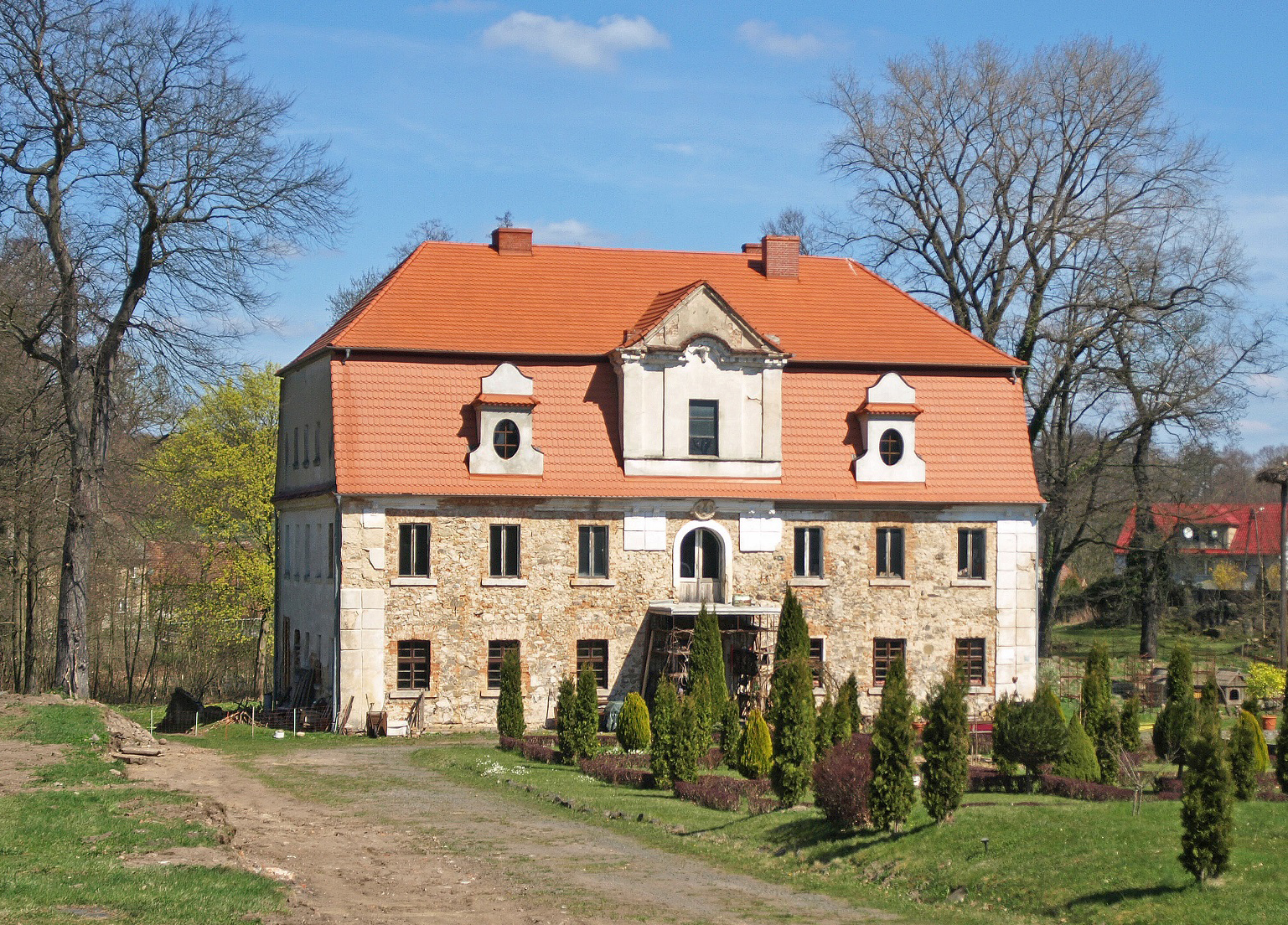
- Manor house

- Location within Poland
- Coordinates: 51°11′21″N 15°08′44″E
- Country: Poland
- Voivodeship: Lower Silesian
- County: Zgorzelec
- Gmina: Zgorzelec
- Population: 316

Gronów [ˈɡrɔnuf] (German: Gruna, Upper Sorbian: Gronow) is a village in the administrative district of Gmina Zgorzelec, within Zgorzelec County, Lower Silesian Voivodeship, in south-western Poland, close to the German border.
