= Tylice, Lower Silesian Voivodeship =

Tylice
- Village
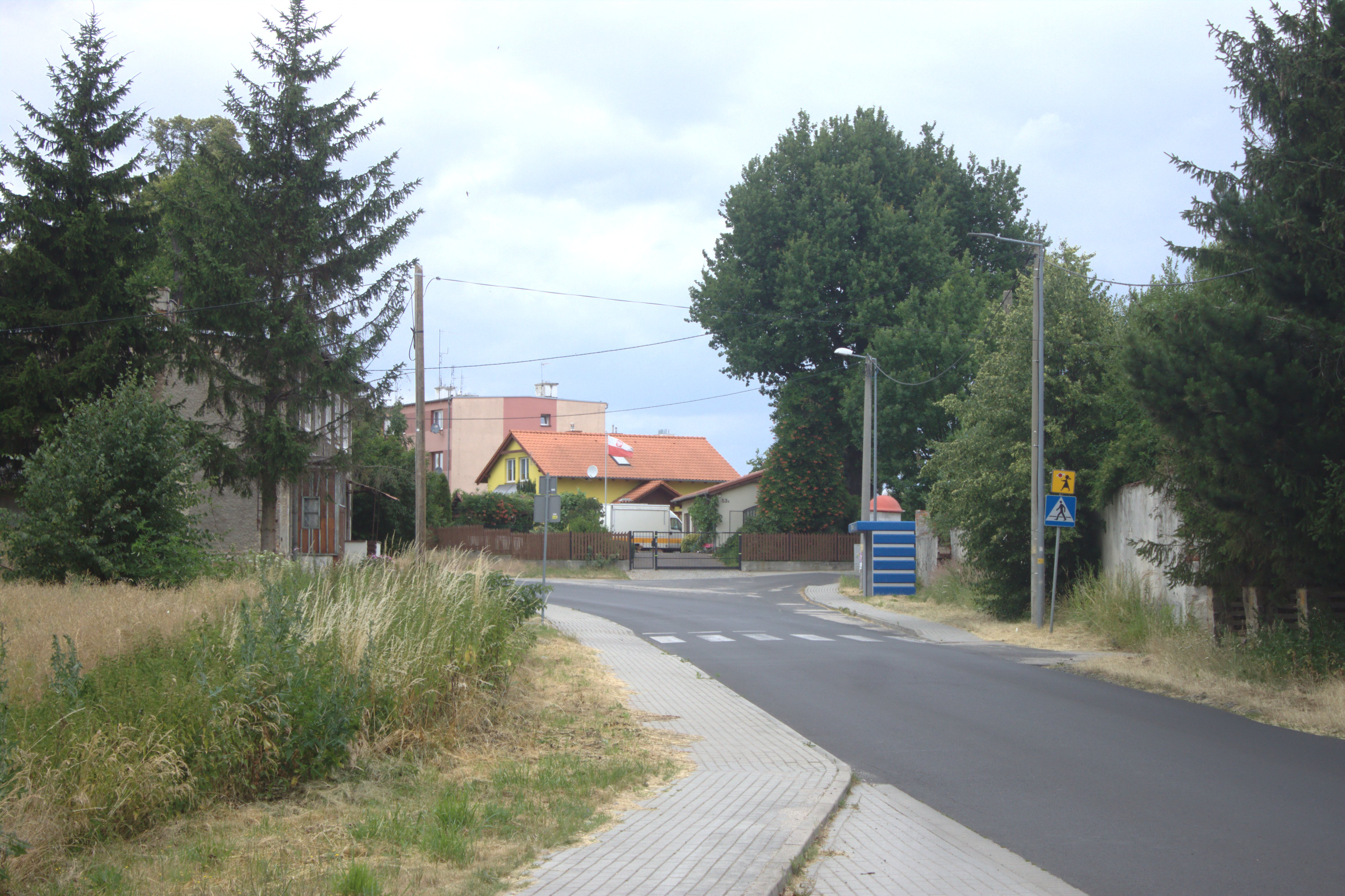
- Road with houses

- Location within Poland
- Coordinates: 51°6′39″N 15°2′16″E
- Country: Poland
- Voivodeship: Lower Silesian
- County: Zgorzelec
- Gmina: Zgorzelec

Population
  - Total: 545
- Time zone: UTC+1 (CET)
  - Summer (DST): UTC+2 (CEST)
- Vehicle registration: DZG

Tylice [tɨˈlit͡sɛ] is a village in the administrative district of Gmina Zgorzelec, within Zgorzelec County, Lower Silesian Voivodeship, in south-western Poland, close to the German border. It is situated on the Czerwona Woda River.

== Etymology ==
The name is of Slavic origin. Konstanty Damrot in his work from 1896 mentioned the village under its Polish name Cielce and German name Thielitz, and derived the name from the word cielec meaning "calf".

== Gallery ==
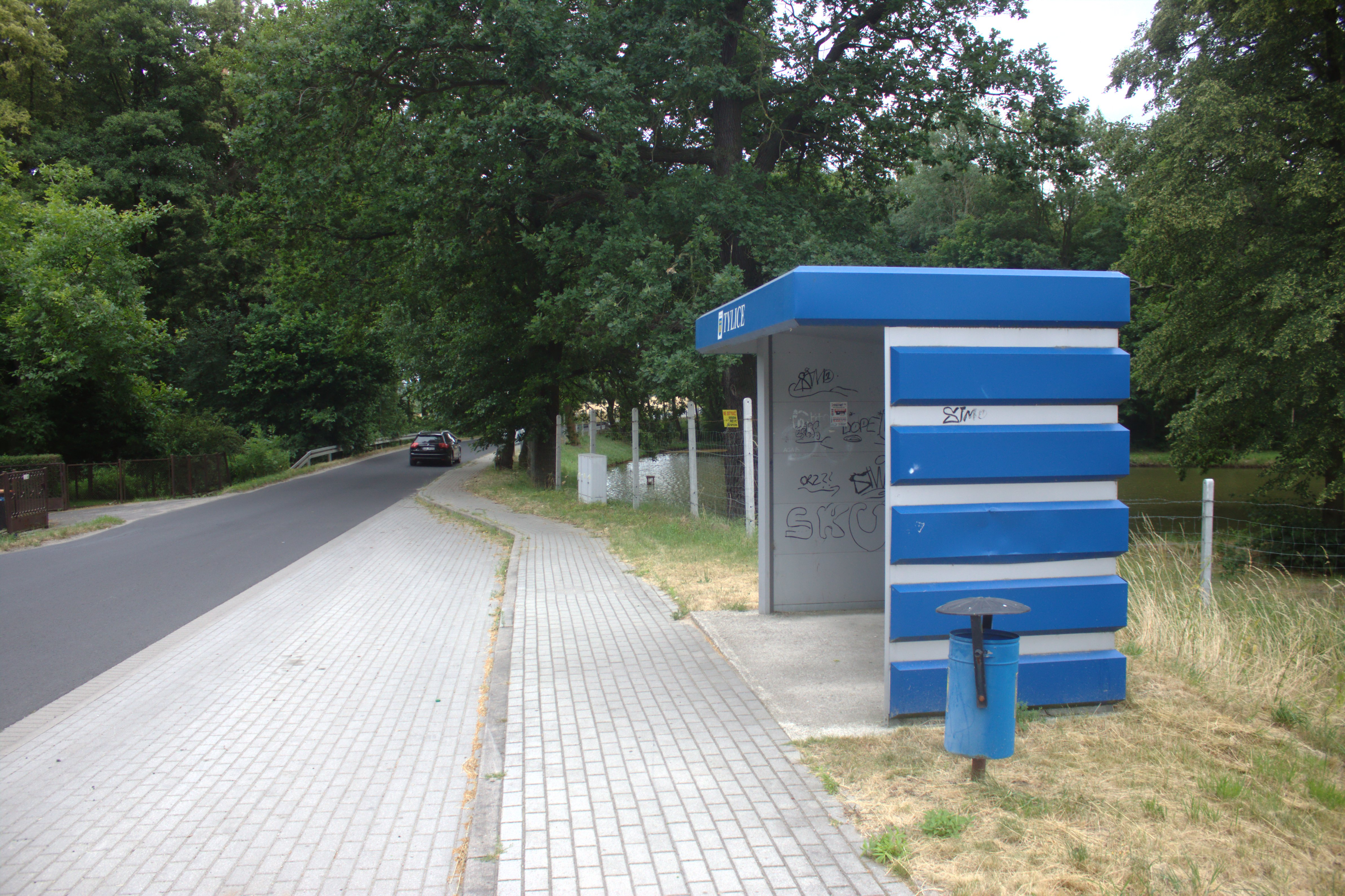
Bus stop shelter

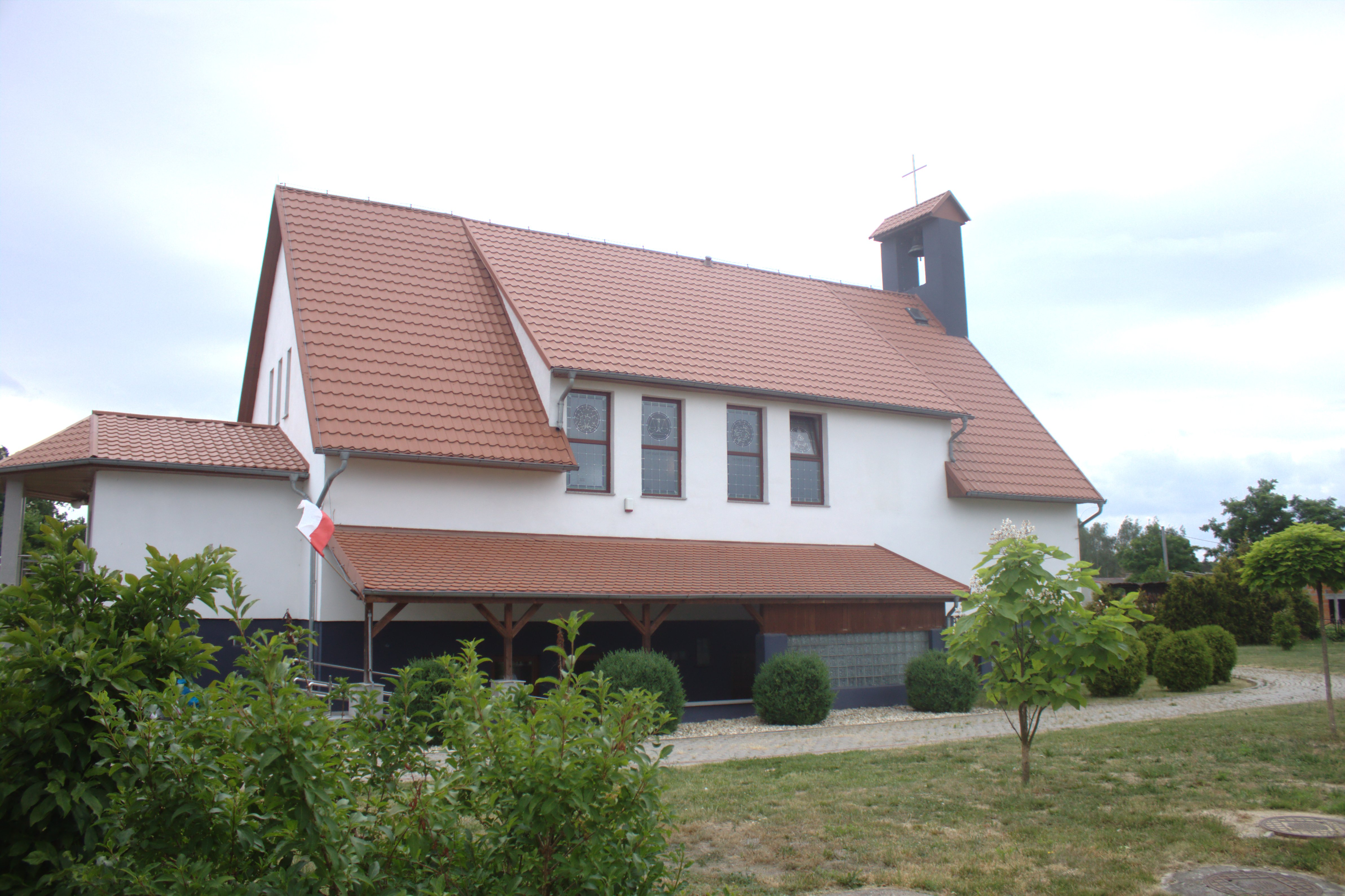
Local church

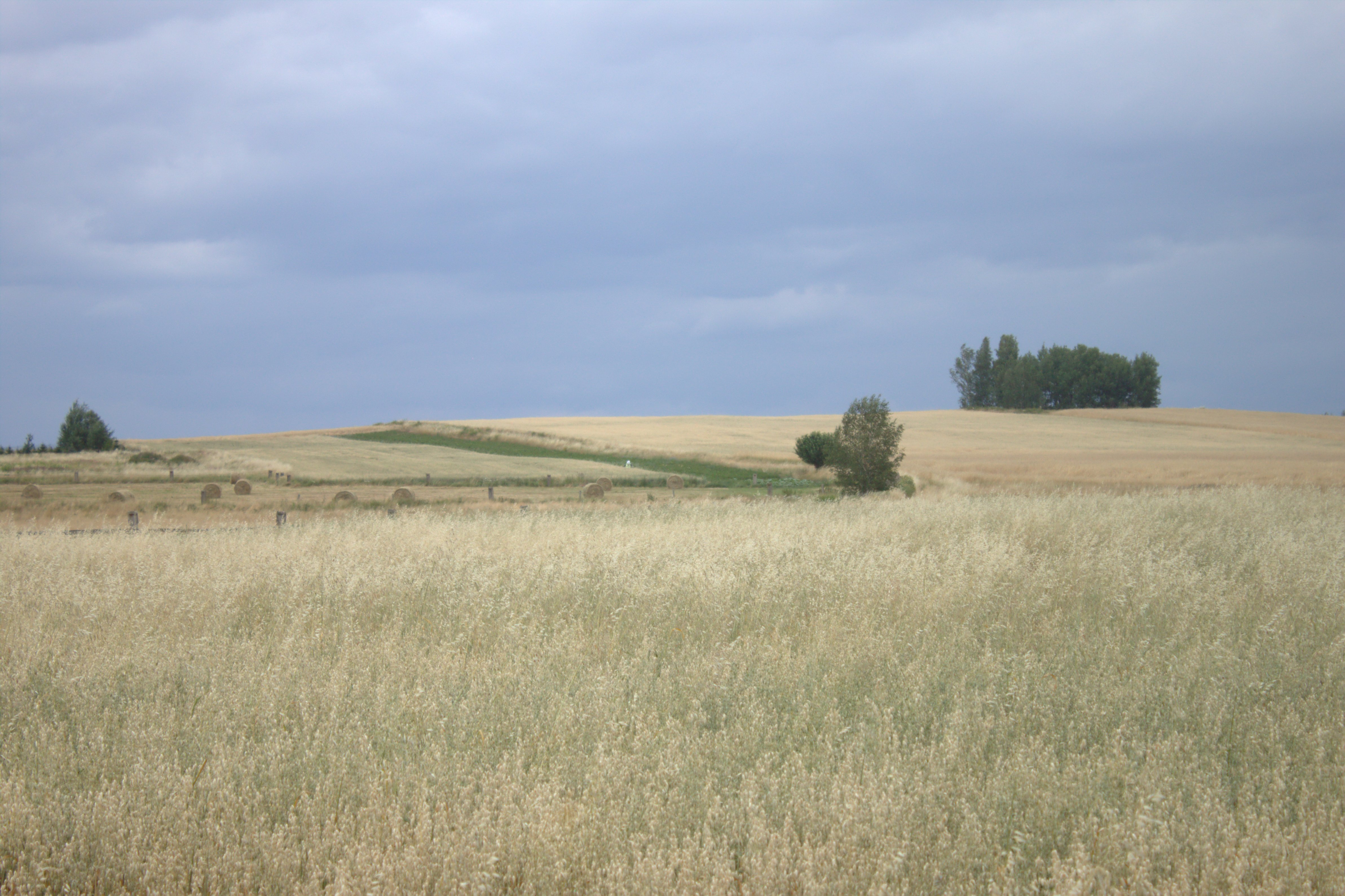
Surrounding countryside
