= Gmina Zgorzelec =

Gmina Zgorzelec Zgorzelec Commune
- Gmina
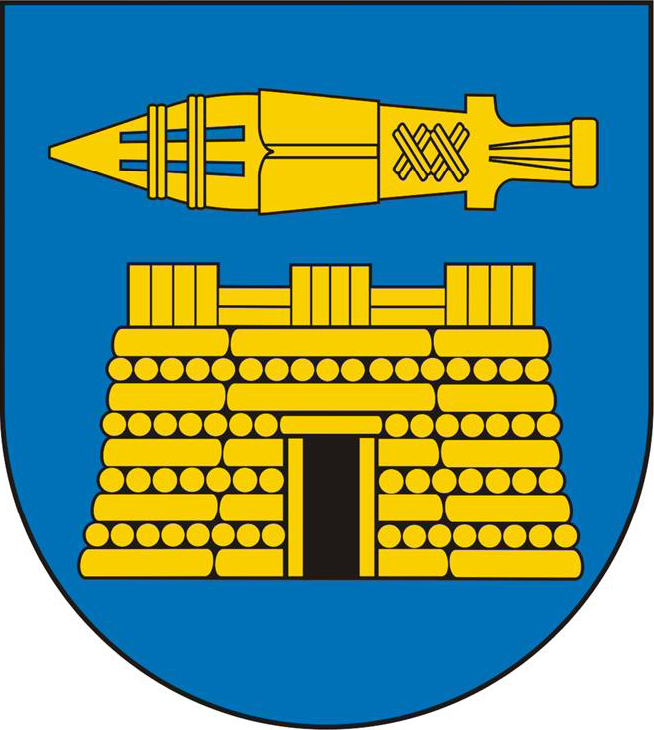
- Flag Coat of arms
- Interactive map of Gmina Zgorzelec
- Coordinates (Zgorzelec): 51°09′01″N 15°00′31″E
- Country: Poland
- Voivodeship: Lower Silesian
- County: Zgorzelec
- Seat: Zgorzelec
- Sołectwos: Białogórze, Gozdanin, Gronów, Jędrzychowice, Jerzmanki, Kostrzyna, Koźlice, Koźmin, Kunów, Łagów, Łomnica, Niedów, Osiek Łużycki, Pokrzywnik, Przesieczany, Radomierzyce, Ręczyn, Sławnikowice, Spytków, Trójca, Tylice, Żarska Wieś

Area
  - Total: 136.02 km^{2} (52.52 sq mi)

Population (2019-06-30)
  - Total: 8,504
  - Density: 62.52/km^{2} (161.9/sq mi)
- Website: http://www.gmina.zgorzelec.pl

Gmina Zgorzelec is a rural gmina (administrative district) in Zgorzelec County, Lower Silesian Voivodeship, in south-western Poland, on the German border. Its seat is the town of Zgorzelec, although the town is not part of the territory of the gmina.

The gmina covers an area of 136.02 square kilometres (52.5 sq mi), and as of 2019 its total population is 8,504.

== Neighbouring gminas ==
Gmina Zgorzelec is bordered by the town of Zgorzelec and by the gminas of Bogatynia, Lubań, Pieńsk, Siekierczyn and Sulików. It also borders Germany.

== Villages ==
The gmina contains the villages of Białogórze, Gozdanin, Gronów, Jędrzychowice, Jerzmanki, Kostrzyna, Koźlice, Koźmin, Kunów, Łagów, Łomnica, Niedów, Osiek Łużycki, Pokrzywnik, Przesieczany, Radomierzyce, Ręczyn, Sławnikowice, Spytków, Trójca, Tylice and Żarska Wieś.
