= Trójca, Lower Silesian Voivodeship =

Trójca
- Village
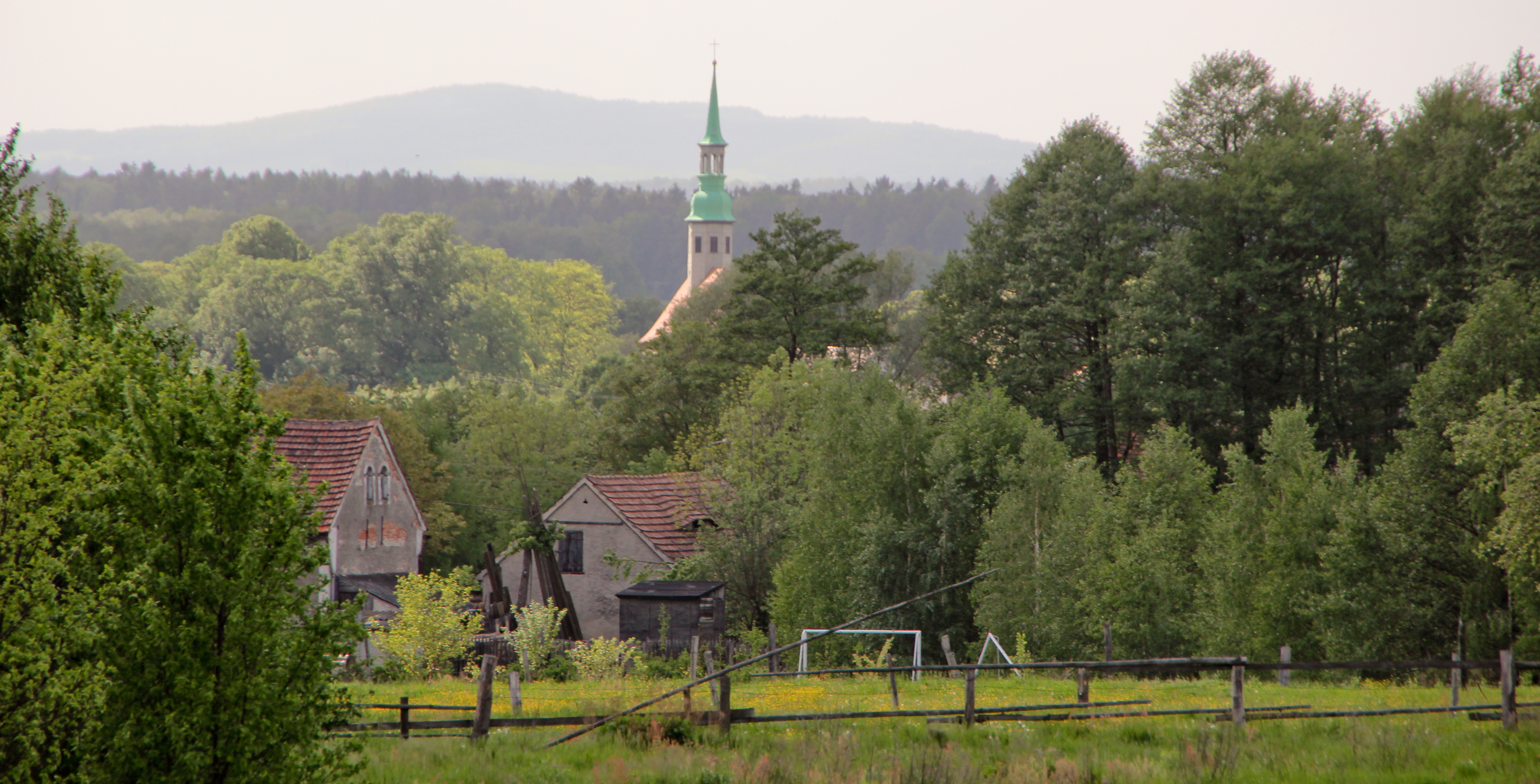
- The village in 2012

- Location within Poland
- Coordinates: 51°09′31″N 15°06′06″E
- Country: Poland
- Voivodeship: Lower Silesian
- County: Zgorzelec
- Gmina: Zgorzelec
- Population: 626

Trójca [ˈtrui̯t͡sa] (Upper Sorbian: Trojicy) is a village in the administrative district of Gmina Zgorzelec, within Zgorzelec County, Lower Silesian Voivodeship, in south-western Poland, close to the German border.
