= Zgorzelec County =

Coordinates: 51°09′01″N 15°00′31″E

Zgorzelec County Powiat zgorzelecki
- County
- Flag Coat of arms

- Location within the voivodeship
- Country: Poland
- Voivodeship: Lower Silesian
- Seat: Zgorzelec
- Gminas: Total 7 (incl. 2 urban): Zawidów; Zgorzelec; Gmina Bogatynia; Gmina Pieńsk; Gmina Sulików; Gmina Węgliniec; Gmina Zgorzelec

Area
  - Total: 838.11 km^{2} (323.60 sq mi)

Population (2019-06-30)
  - Total: 89,612
  - Density: 106.92/km^{2} (276.93/sq mi)
  - Urban: 60,664
  - Rural: 28,948
- Car plates: DZG
- Website: www.powiat.zgorzelec.pl

Zgorzelec County (Polish: powiat zgorzelecki) is a unit of territorial administration and local government (powiat) in Lower Silesian Voivodeship, Poland. It came into being on January 1, 1999, as a result of the Polish local government reforms passed in 1998. It is situated in the extreme south-west of Poland, bordering both Germany and the Czech Republic. The county covers an area of 838.1 square kilometres (323.6 sq mi). Its administrative seat is Zgorzelec, on the German border; the other towns in the county are Bogatynia, Pieńsk, Zawidów and Węgliniec.

As of 2019 the total population of the county is 89,612. The most populated towns are Zgorzelec with 30,374 inhabitants and Bogatynia with 17,436 inhabitants.

== Neighbouring counties ==
Zgorzelec County is bordered by Żary County and Żagań County to the north, and Bolesławiec County and Lubań County to the east. It also borders the Czech Republic to the south and Germany to the west.

== Administrative divisions ==
The county is subdivided into seven gminas (two urban, three urban-rural and two rural). These are listed in the following table, in descending order of population.

Gmina	Type	Area (km^{2})	Population (2019)	Seat
Zgorzelec	urban	15.9	30,374	
Gmina Bogatynia	urban-rural	136.2	23,083	Bogatynia
Gmina Pieńsk	urban-rural	110.3	9,068	Pieńsk
Gmina Zgorzelec	rural	136.0	8,504	Zgorzelec*
Gmina Węgliniec	urban-rural	338.4	8,351	Węgliniec
Gmina Sulików	rural	95.2	6,052	Sulików
Zawidów	urban	6.1	4,180	
* seat not part of the gmina

== See also ==
- Category:Rail transport in Zgorzelec County
