= Mikułowa railway station =

Railway station in south-western Poland

Mikułowa
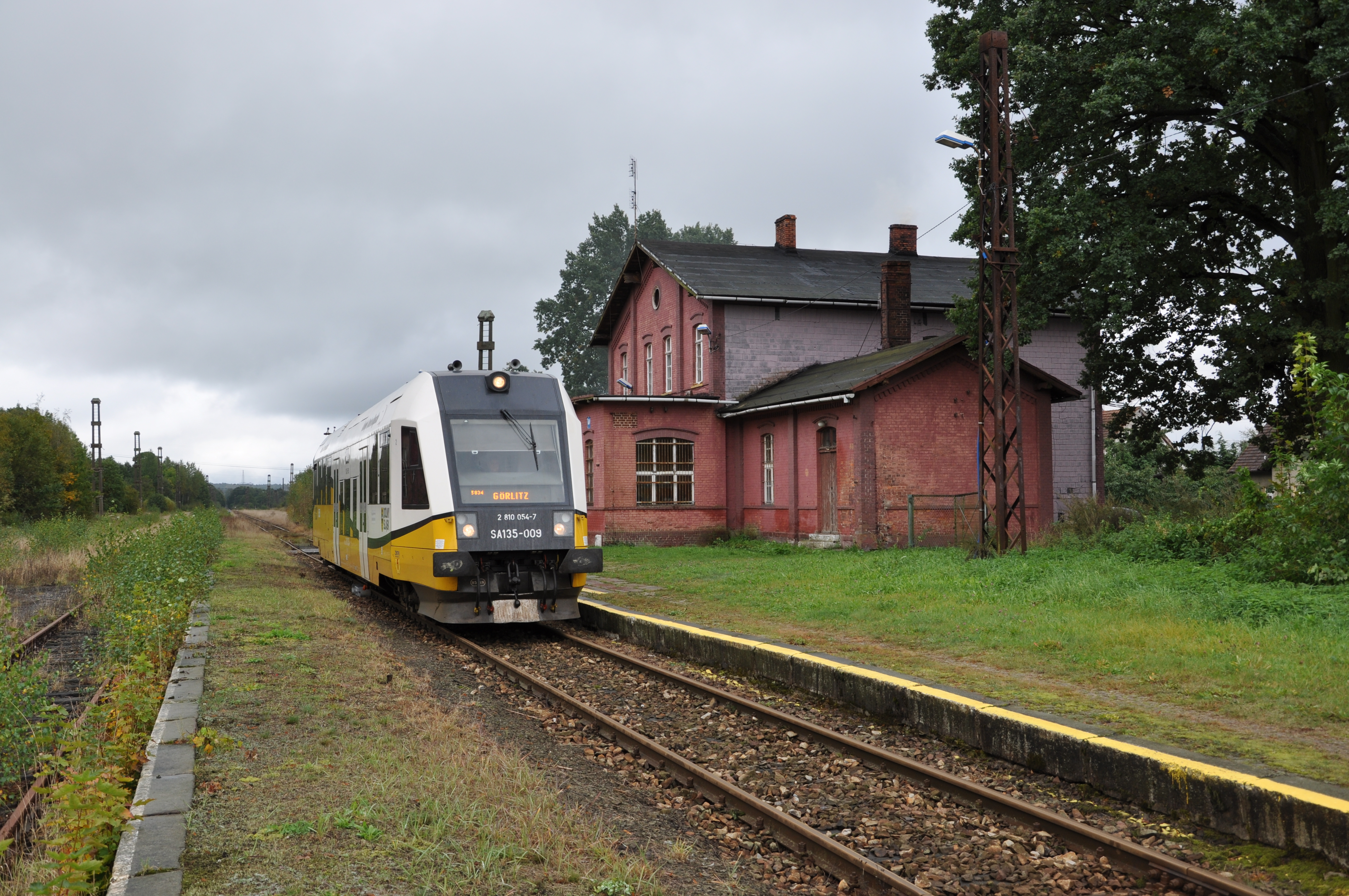
- Lower Silesian Railways railbus SA135 bound for Görlitz in 2016, prior to the station's closure

General information
- Location: Mikułowa, Lower Silesian Voivodeship; Poland
- Coordinates: 51°05′41.0″N 15°06′37.6″E
- Owner: Polish State Railways
- Lines: Silesian Mountain Railway; Wrocław Świebodzki–Zgorzelec railway; Mikułowa–Bogatynia railway (freight only)
- Platforms: 2

History
- Opened: 20 September 1865
- Closed: 13 December 2025
- Former names: Nicolausdorf (1865–1912); Nikolausdorf (1912–1945); Nikorsk (1945–1947)
Location
- Location within Poland Location within Lower Silesian Voivodeship

Mikułowa (German: Nikolausdorf) is a closed railway station in the village of Mikułowa, Zgorzelec County, within the Lower Silesian Voivodeship in south-western Poland.

The station closed on 13 December 2025. According to Lower Silesian Railways, it closed due to a low passenger usage, and as it was replaced by Studniska railway station, which is located approximately 2.4 km (1.5 mi) on the line west of the station. As of May 2026, Lower Silesian Railways trains do not stop at the station. Residents of Mikułowa have to walk approximately 4 km (2.5 mi) to get to Batowice Lubańskie, the closest station to Mikułowa by walking distance.

Local residents of Mikułowa strongly opposed the closure of the station, and took action by protesting and signing petitions. The mayor of Mikułowa held a local meeting with residents, and sent a letter to Lower Silesian Railways. Gmina Sulików also opposed the station's closure, and is currently attempting to bring the station back into operation, working with the Lower Silesian Voivodeship.

== History ==
=== Pre World War II ===
The station opened on 20 September 1865 as Nicolausdorf, part of the Silesian Mountain Railway. The station consisted of three passing tracks with two platforms, and a goods yard. In 1900, an additional line of tracks on the Silesian Mountain Railway was built, making the line a double-track railway. A new local freight facility opened, consisting of three sidings.

With the electrification of the Silesian Mountain Railway between Zgorzelec and Lubań completed in the 1920s, the first part of the Mikułowa–Bogatynia railway opened between Mikułowa and Sulików on 27 October 1927, originally as a narrow-gauge railway.

=== Post World War II ===
After World War II, the area came under Polish administration. As a result, the station was taken over by Polish State Railways. The station was renamed to Nikorsk, and later to its modern name, Mikułowa, in 1947. Prior to these name changes, in 1946, one of the lines of track on the Silesian Mountain Railway was dismantled by the Red Army under 'war reparations', making the railway single-track. Overhead wires were also dismantled, unelectrifying the line.

On 28 May 1960, the rest of the Mikułowa–Bogatynia railway opened, after it received its final extension to Bogatynia. On 30 June 1961, the remaining narrow-gauge railway between Mikułowa and Sulików closed, after it was replaced by a standard-gauge railway. In the 1960s, an industrial siding to the Mikułowa substation was built at the eastern end of the station.

On 3 April 2000, passenger services on the Mikułowa–Bogatynia railway were withdrawn. Two years later, on 1 October 2002, passenger services were fully withdrawn from the station, between Zgorzelec and Lubań. Lower Silesian Railways resumed passenger services on 11 December 2011, with services operating between Zgorzelec and Jelenia Góra via Lubań.

==== Closure ====
On 13 December 2025, the station closed due to the opening of Studniska railway station, and low passenger numbers of Mikułowa, according to Lower Silesian Railways. However, due to a long walking distance to other nearby stations, including Studniska, local residents of Mikułowa strongly opposed the closure, and took action by protesting and signing petitions. The prime minister of Poland, Donald Tusk, Gmina Sulików, and the mayor of Mikułowa, all also strongly opposed the closure, and are currently attempting to re-open the station, working with the Lower Silesian Voivodeship and Lower Silesian Railways.

As of 2026, Lower Silesian Railways services do not stop at the station.

== Former services ==
Preceding station	Disused railways	Following station
Sulików towards Bogatynia	Polish State Railways; Mikułowa–Bogatynia	Terminus

Preceding station	KD	Following station
Batowice Lubańskie towards Świeradów-Zdrój or Karpacz	D62	Jerzmanki towards Görlitz
