= Studniska railway station =

Railway station in Studniska Dolne, south-western Poland

Studniska

General information
- Location: Studniska Dolne, Lower Silesian Voivodeship; Poland
- Coordinates: 51°06′34.7″N 15°05′09.1″E
- Owner: Polish State Railways
- Line: Wrocław Świebodzki–Zgorzelec railway
- Platforms: 1

History
- Opened: 14 December 2025

Services
Preceding station	KD	Following station
Batowice Lubańskie towards Świeradów-Zdrój or Karpacz	D62	Jerzmanki towards Görlitz
Location
- Location within Poland Location within Lower Silesian Voivodeship

Studniska is a railway station on the Wrocław Świebodzki–Zgorzelec railway in the village of Studniska Dolne, Zgorzelec County, within the Lower Silesian Voivodeship in south-western Poland.

The station lies on the embankment of the railway viaduct in which the road connecting Studniska Dolne and Studniska Górne runs underneath.

== History ==
Construction on the station began in early May 2025. The project costed approximately 4 million Polish Złoty, funded by the Governmental Programme for the Construction or Modernisation of Railway Stops for 2021–2025.

The station opened on 14 December 2025. It replaced Mikułowa railway station, which closed the day prior. The closure of Mikułowa was widely opposed among local residents of the Mikułowa, due to the long walking distance the station is from the town.

== Train services ==
The station is served by the following services:

- Regional services (KD) Karpacz / Świeradów-Zdrój - Gryfów Śląski - Görlitz
