= Ubocze railway station =

Railway station in Ubocze, south-western Poland

Ubocze
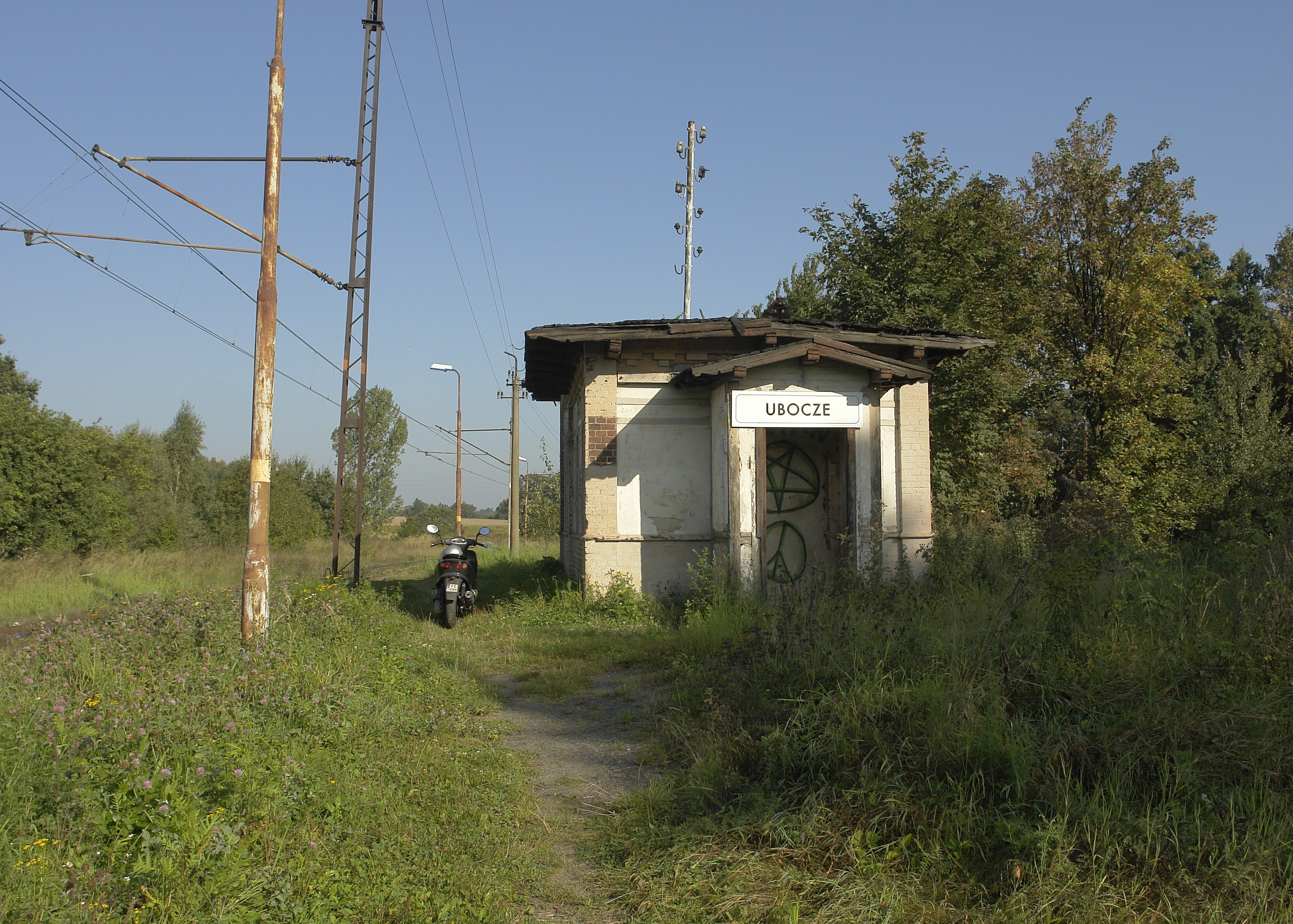
- Shelter

General information
- Location: Ubocze, Lower Silesian Voivodeship; Poland
- Coordinates: 51°03′22.0″N 15°25′12.0″E
- Owner: Polish State Railways
- Line: Wrocław Świebodzki–Zgorzelec railway
- Platforms: 1

History
- Opened: 1 December 1905
- Former names: Schosdorf (1905–1945); Owczyn (1945–1947)

Services
Preceding station	KD	Following station
Gryfów Śląski towards Świeradów-Zdrój or Karpacz	D62	Olszyna Lubańska towards Görlitz
Location
- Location within Poland Location within Lower Silesian Voivodeship

Ubocze (German: Schosdorf) is a railway station on the Wrocław Świebodzki–Zgorzelec railway in the village of Ubocze, Lwówek County, within the Lower Silesian Voivodeship in south-western Poland.

== History ==
The station opened on 1 December 1905 as Schosdorf, part of the Silesian Mountain Railway. After World War II, the area came under Polish administration. As a result, the station was taken over by Polish State Railways. The station was renamed to Owczyn and later to its modern name, Ubocze in 1947.

On 13 December 2020, the station became a request stop of Lower Silesian Railways services.

== Train services ==
The station is a request stop of Lower Silesian Railways services.

The station is served by the following services:

- Regional services (KD) Karpacz / Świeradów-Zdrój - Gryfów Śląski - Görlitz
