= Zaręba railway station =

Railway station in south-western Poland

Zaręba
- Station in 1922

General information
- Location: Zaręba, Lower Silesian Voivodeship; Poland
- Coordinates: 51°05′52.1″N 15°13′05.1″E
- Owner: Polish State Railways
- Line: Wrocław Świebodzki–Zgorzelec railway
- Platforms: 1

History
- Opened: 20 September 1865
- Former names: Lichtenau (1865–1915); Lichtenau (Schlesien) (1915–1945); Lichnów (1945–1947)

Services
Preceding station	KD	Following station
Lubań Śląski towards Świeradów-Zdrój or Karpacz	D62	Batowice Lubańskie towards Görlitz
Location
- Location within Poland Location within Lower Silesian Voivodeship

Zaręba (German: Lichtenau) is a railway station on the Wrocław Świebodzki–Zgorzelec railway in the village of Zaręba, Lubań County, within the Lower Silesian Voivodeship in south-western Poland.

Several sidings branch off the station into nearby works.

== History ==
The station opened on 20 September 1865 as Lichtenau, part of the Silesian Mountain Railway. In 1915, it was renamed to Lichtenau (Schlesien) for designation. After World War II, the area came under Polish administration. As a result, the station was taken over by Polish State Railways. The station was renamed to Lichnów and later to its modern name, Zaręba in 1947.

== Accidents and incidents ==
- List of German rail accidents: on 24 October 1944, a train from Wrocław bound for Berlin collided head-on with an electric locomotive. The electric locomotive suffered severe damages and was scrapped on the site of the collision. The cause of the collision was never determined.

== Train services ==
The station is served by the following services:

- Regional services (KD) Karpacz / Świeradów-Zdrój - Gryfów Śląski - Görlitz
