= Luban (disambiguation) =

Luban is a town in the Lower Silesian Voivodeship in southwest Poland.

Luban may also refer to:

== Places ==
- Lubań (disambiguation), settlements in Poland
- Luban Road station, Shanghai
- Luban-Zardakh, Zanjan Province, Iran

== People ==
- Binyomin Luban, American rabbi
- Sun Luban (fl. 229–258), Eastern Wu (China) imperial princess
- Yaakov Luban, American rabbi

== Transport ==
- Lubań Śląski railway station, Lower Silesian Voivodeship
- Lubań Miasto railway station, Lower Silesian Voivodeship
- Batowice Lubańskie railway station, Lower Silesian Voivodeship
- Olszyna Lubańska railway station, Lower Silesian Voivodeship

== Other uses ==
- Luban languages, spoken in Congo and Zambia
- Cyclone Luban, 2018
- The Gate of Luban in Golgonooza, in the mythology of William Blake

== See also ==
- Lyuban (disambiguation)
- Lu Ban (c. 507–444 BC), Chinese engineer and philosopher
- Labana, a people of Punjab, India
- Lubanki dialect, or Labanki, a dialect of Punjabi spoken by the people
