= Jerzmanki railway station =

Railway station in Jerzmanki, south-western Poland

Jerzmanki
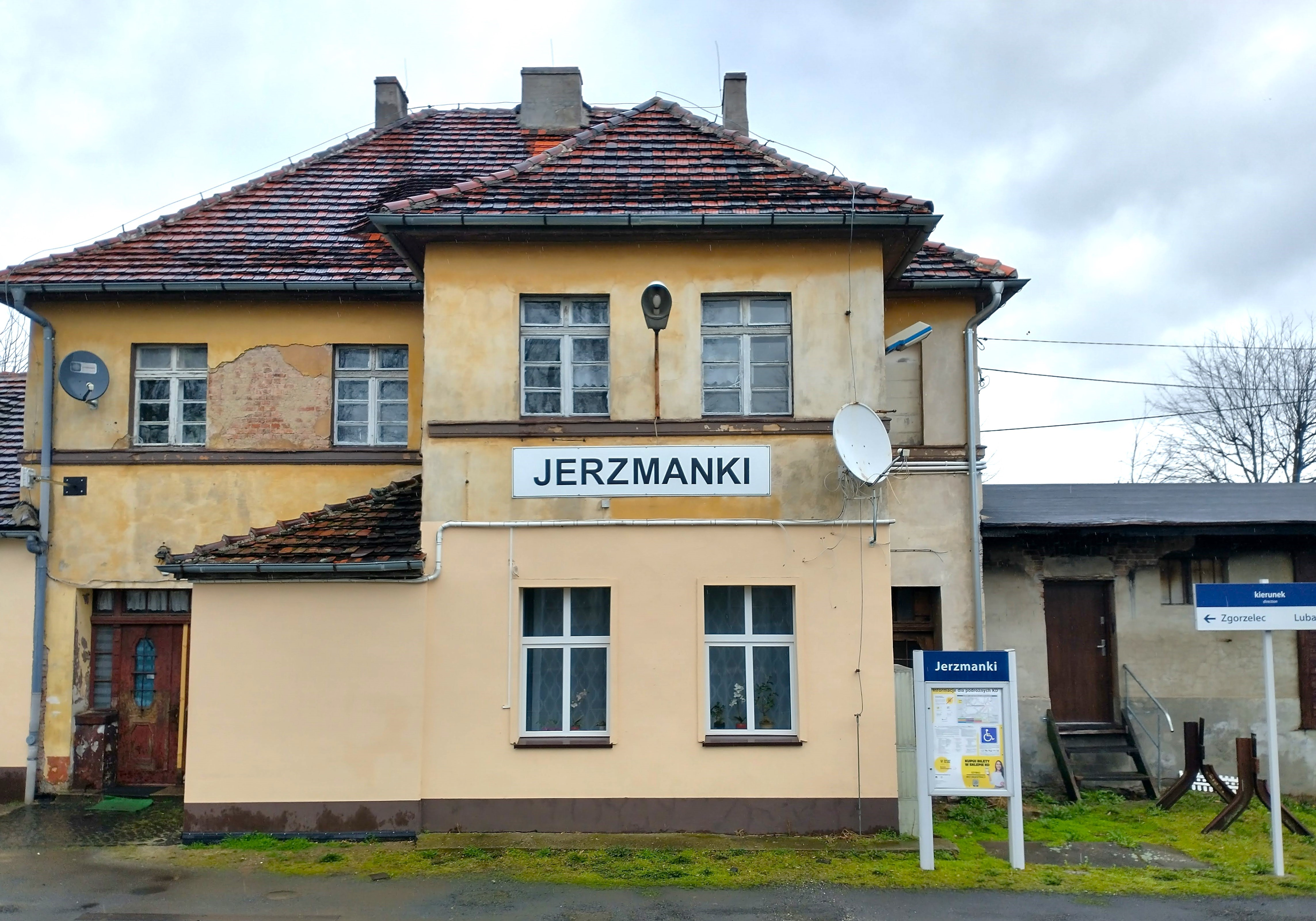
- Station building in 2023

General information
- Location: Jerzmanki, Lower Silesian Voivodeship; Poland
- Coordinates: 51°07′39.1″N 15°03′39.1″E
- Owner: Polish State Railways
- Line: Wrocław Świebodzki–Zgorzelec railway
- Platforms: 2

History
- Opened: 15 October 1879

Services
Preceding station	KD	Following station
Studniska towards Świeradów-Zdrój or Karpacz	D62	Zgorzelec towards Görlitz
Location
- Location within Poland Location within Lower Silesian Voivodeship

Jerzmanki (German: Hermsdorf) is a railway station on the Wrocław Świebodzki–Zgorzelec railway in the village of Jerzmanki, Zgorzelec County, within the Lower Silesian Voivodeship in south-western Poland.

== History ==
=== Pre World War II ===
Construction of the station began in autumn 1877. The station opened as Hermsdorf part of the Silesian Mountain Railway on 15 October 1879. It was renamed to Hermsdorf (bei Görlitz) for designation in 1895. The current station building was built between 1910 and 1912, during which the Silesian Mountain Railway was being prepared for electrification.

The section of the line between Zgorzelec and Jerzmanki was electrified with a 15 kV single-phase AC power supply system at a frequency of 16 2/3 Hz during hyperinflation. To cut costs, concrete masts with a core of cast iron gas pipes were used as opposed to the previous cast iron poles. The masts were constructed by Deyckerhoff & Widmann AG of Dresden, while the overhead wires were installed by Siemens. The first test run of an electric locomotive from Lubań to Zgorzelec took place on 15 August 1923. The electrified section between Zgorzelec and Jerzmanki opened on 1 September 1924, after nearly 16 years of preparations and tests.

=== Post World War II ===
The Silesian Mountain Railway did not suffer significant damages as a result of World War II. After World War II, the area came under Polish administration. As a result, the station was taken over by Polish State Railways, and was renamed to Jerzmanice koło Nikorska. Under new PKP classification, the station became part of the Wrocław Świebodzki–Zgorzelec railway.

In the summer of 1945, the overhead wires were shot in several locations along the Zgorzelec–Lubań section. Remaining German railway works in the area began repairing the overhead wires under the supervision of Polish State Railways officials. In 1946, one of the lines of track was dismantled by the Red Army under 'war reparations'. This made the line a single track. Overhead wires were also dismantled, and any remaining German rolling stock was stolen and driven to the Soviet Union. Passenger services resumed using steam locomotives.

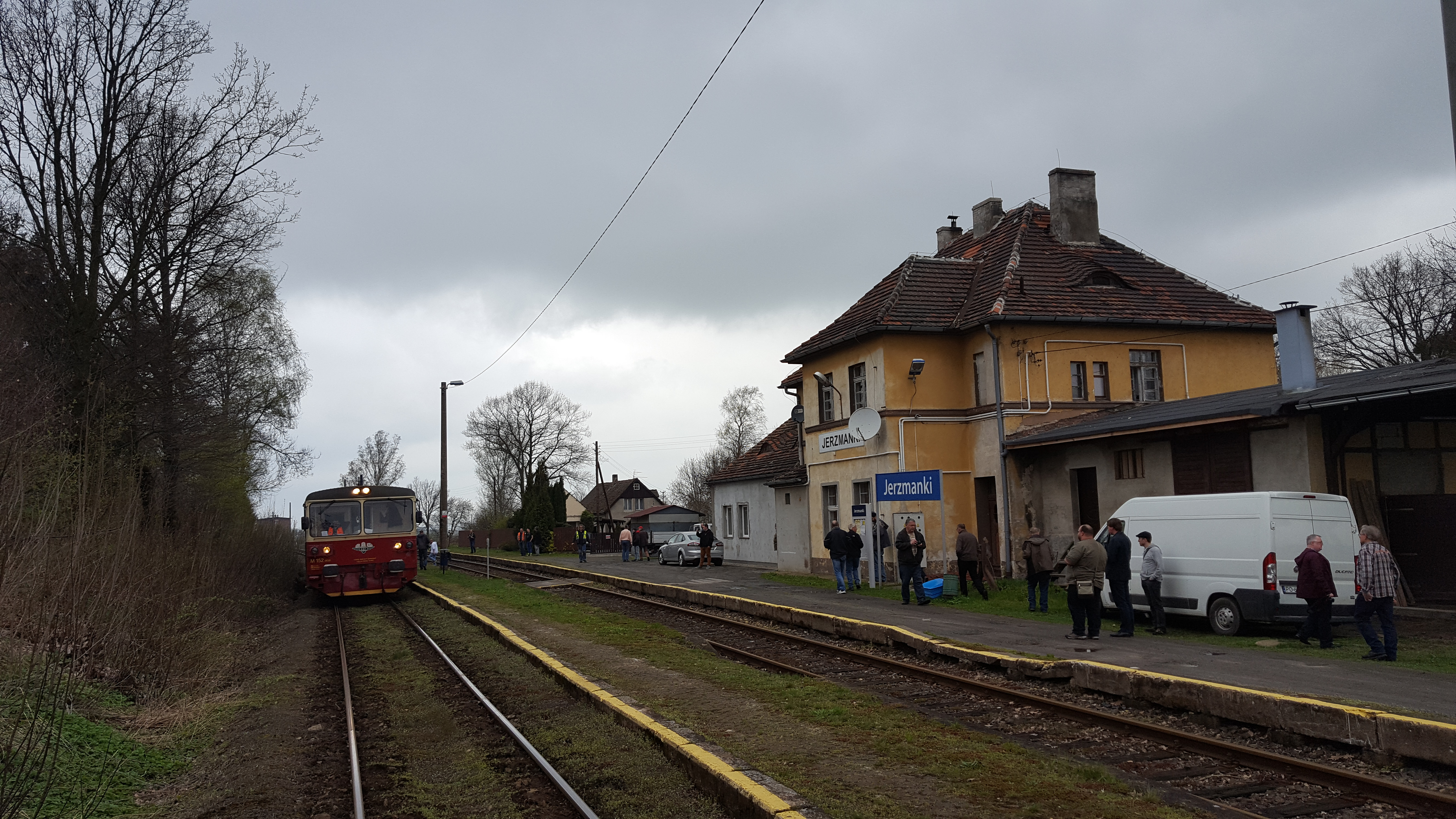
Tourist train at the station in 2017

The station was renamed to its modern name, Jerzmanki, in 1947. In the 1960s, passenger services began using diesel locomotives, which were based in Węgliniec. At one point in the 1980s, up to eight pairs of passenger trains called at the station. In 1985, there were plans to re-electrify the line between Zgorzelec and Lubań, part of electrifying the line between Zgorzelec and Lubań via Węgliniec, to a form a circular electrified railway. These plans never occurred, the only part that was electrified was between Węgliniec and Lubań.

== Train services ==
The station is served by the following services:

- Regional services (KD) Karpacz / Świeradów-Zdrój - Gryfów Śląski - Görlitz
