= Olszyna Lubańska railway station =

Railway station in Olszyna, south-western Poland

Olszyna Lubańska
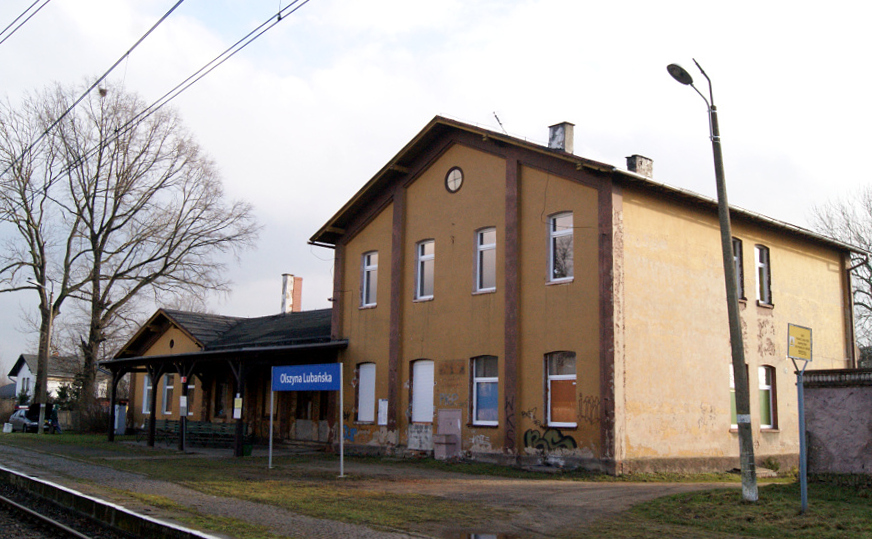
- Station building and platform in 2015

General information
- Location: Olszyna, Lower Silesian Voivodeship; Poland
- Coordinates: 51°04′11.0″N 15°22′47.1″E
- Owner: Polish State Railways
- Line: Wrocław Świebodzki–Zgorzelec railway
- Platforms: 2

History
- Opened: 20 September 1865
- Former names: Langenöls (1865–1945); Olesińsk (1945–1947)

Services
| Preceding station | KD | Following station |
|---|---|---|
| Ubocze towards Świeradów-Zdrój or Karpacz | D62 | Lubań Śląski towards Görlitz |
Location
- Location within Poland Location within Lower Silesian Voivodeship

Olszyna Lubańska (German: Langenöls) is a railway station on the Wrocław Świebodzki–Zgorzelec railway in the town of Olszyna, Lubań County, within the Lower Silesian Voivodeship in south-western Poland.

== History ==
The station opened on 20 September 1865 as Langenöls, part of the Silesian Mountain Railway. After World War II, the area came under Polish administration. As a result, the station was taken over by Polish State Railways. The station was renamed to Olesińsk and later to its modern name, Olszyna Lubańska (Lubańska for designation) in 1947.

Sidings once branched off to a nearby furniture factory.

== Train services ==
The station is served by the following services:

- Regional services (KD) Karpacz / Świeradów-Zdrój - Gryfów Śląski - Görlitz
