= Zareba =

Zareba may refer to

- Zaręba, a Polish village
- Zareba (ship structure), a breakwater-like structure on ships, intended to deflect sea-water off the deck
- Zareba, an enclosure of bushes or stakes protecting a campsite or village in northeast Africa
