= Rudzica =

Rudzica may refer to the following places in Poland:

- Rudzica, Greater Poland Voivodeship (west-central Poland)
- Rudzica, Lower Silesian Voivodeship (south-west Poland)
- Rudzica, Silesian Voivodeship (south Poland)
