= Rudzica, Lower Silesian Voivodeship =

Rudzica Hennersdorf (German, until 1945)
- Village
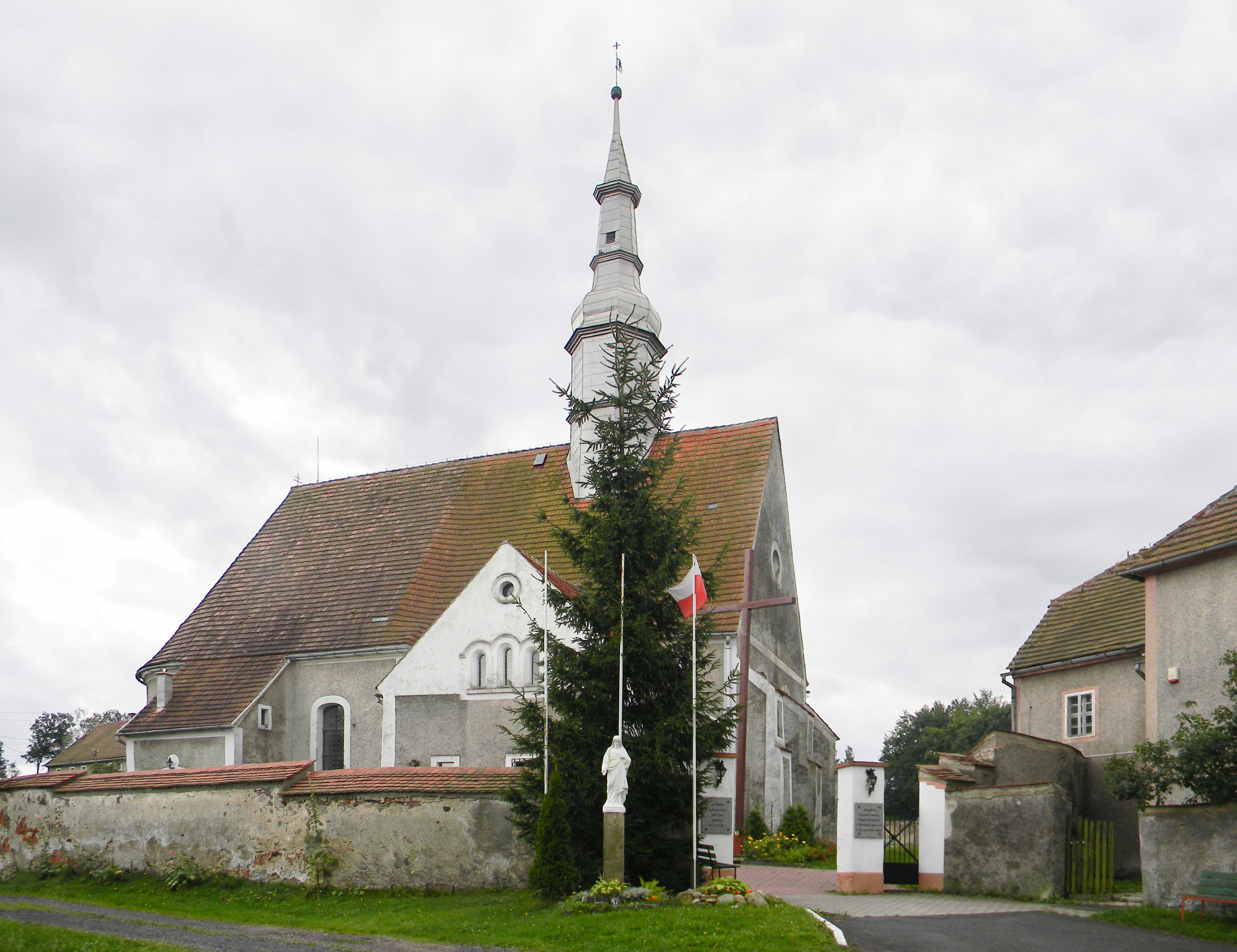
- Saint Catherine's Church in Rudzica

- Location within Lower Silesian Voivodeship
- Coordinates: 51°06′51″N 15°08′53″E
- Country: Poland
- Voivodeship: Lower Silesian
- County: Lubań
- Gmina: Siekierczyn
- First mentioned: 1346

Government
  - Type: Sołectwo
- Elevation: 230 m (750 ft)
- Population: 419 (as of 2,011)
- Postal code: 59-818
- Area code: (+48) 75

Rudzica [ruˈd͡ʑit͡sa] (German: Hennersdorf) is a village in the administrative district of Gmina Siekierczyn, within Lubań County, Lower Silesian Voivodeship, in south-western Poland, close to the border with Germany.

== History ==
The area formed part of Poland since the establishment of the state in the 10th century under the Piast dynasty. Following the fragmentation of Poland into smaller duchies, it formed part of the duchies of Silesia and later Jawor. The village was first mentioned in historical records in 1346 as Henrici villa. From the 14th century, it was under the rule of the Bohemian (Czech) Crown. It remained under Bohemian suzerainty, passing with it to the Habsburg Monarchy in 1526.

The village, known as Hennersdorf, was annexed by the Kingdom of Prussia in 1742 during the Silesian Wars. From 1815, it was administered within the Province of Silesia, and from 1871 it was part of the German Empire. It belonged to the Landkreis Lauban within the Regierungsbezirk Liegnitz. During World War II, Nazi Germany operated the E20 forced labour subcamp of the Stalag VIII-A prisoner-of-war camp for Allied POWs in the village.

After Germany's defeat in World War II, the village became part of Poland under the terms of the Potsdam Agreement. The border changes promulgated resulted in the expulsion of the German population resident in the village. It was resettled by Poles, some of whom were themselves expelled from former eastern Polish territories annexed by the Soviet Union. The village was assigned the Polish name Rudzica.

From 1975 to 1998, Rudzica was administratively part of the former Jelenia Góra Voivodeship. Since 1999, it has been part of the Lower Silesian Voivodeship.

According to the 2011 national census, the village had a population of 419.

== Landmarks ==
The main landmark of Rudzica is the historic Saint Catherine's Church (Polish: Kościół św. Katarzyny). Originally a Gothic church from the 14th century, it was significantly rebuilt in the Baroque style in the 18th century. The church features historical furnishings and is listed as a cultural heritage monument of Poland.

There are also several traditional Upper Lusatian half-timbered houses (Polish: domy przysłupowe) preserved in the village, dating mainly from the 18th and 19th centuries.

== Transport ==
Rudzica is located off the main national roads. Access is provided by local roads connecting to Siekierczyn and Lubań. The nearest major road is National road 30 (DK30) which passes nearby to the south-east.
