= Gmina Siekierczyn =

Gmina Siekierczyn Siekierczyn Commune
- Gmina
- Flag Coat of arms
- Interactive map of Gmina Siekierczyn
- Coordinates (Siekierczyn): 51°6′N 15°11′E
- Country: Poland
- Voivodeship: Lower Silesian
- County: Lubań
- Seat: Siekierczyn
- Sołectwos: Nowa Karczma, Rudzica, Siekierczyn, Wesołówka, Wyręba, Zaręba

Area
  - Total: 49.55 km^{2} (19.13 sq mi)

Population (2019-06-30)
  - Total: 4,510
  - Density: 91.0/km^{2} (236/sq mi)
- Website: http://www.siekierczyn.pl

Gmina Siekierczyn is a rural gmina (administrative district) in Lubań County, Lower Silesian Voivodeship, in south-western Poland. Its seat is the village of Siekierczyn, which lies approximately 9 kilometres (6 mi) west of Lubań, and 130 kilometres (81 mi) west of the regional capital Wrocław.

The gmina covers an area of 49.55 square kilometres (19.1 sq mi), and as of 2019 its total population is 4,510.

== Neighbouring gminas ==
Gmina Siekierczyn is bordered by the town of Lubań and the gminas of Lubań, Platerówka, Sulików and Zgorzelec.

== Villages ==
The gmina contains the villages of Nowa Karczma, Pisaczów, Ponikowo, Rudzica, Siekierczyn, Wesołówka, Wyręba and Zaręba.

== Twin towns – sister cities ==
Gmina Siekierczyn is twinned with:

- Frýdlant, Czech Republic
