= Lubań (disambiguation) =

Lubań may refer to the following places:

- Lubań, Pomeranian Voivodeship, a village in northern Poland
- Lubań, Lower Silesian Voivodeship, a town in southwest Poland

== See also ==
- Luban (disambiguation)
- Lyuban (disambiguation)
