= Wyręba, Lower Silesian Voivodeship =

Wyręba
- Village
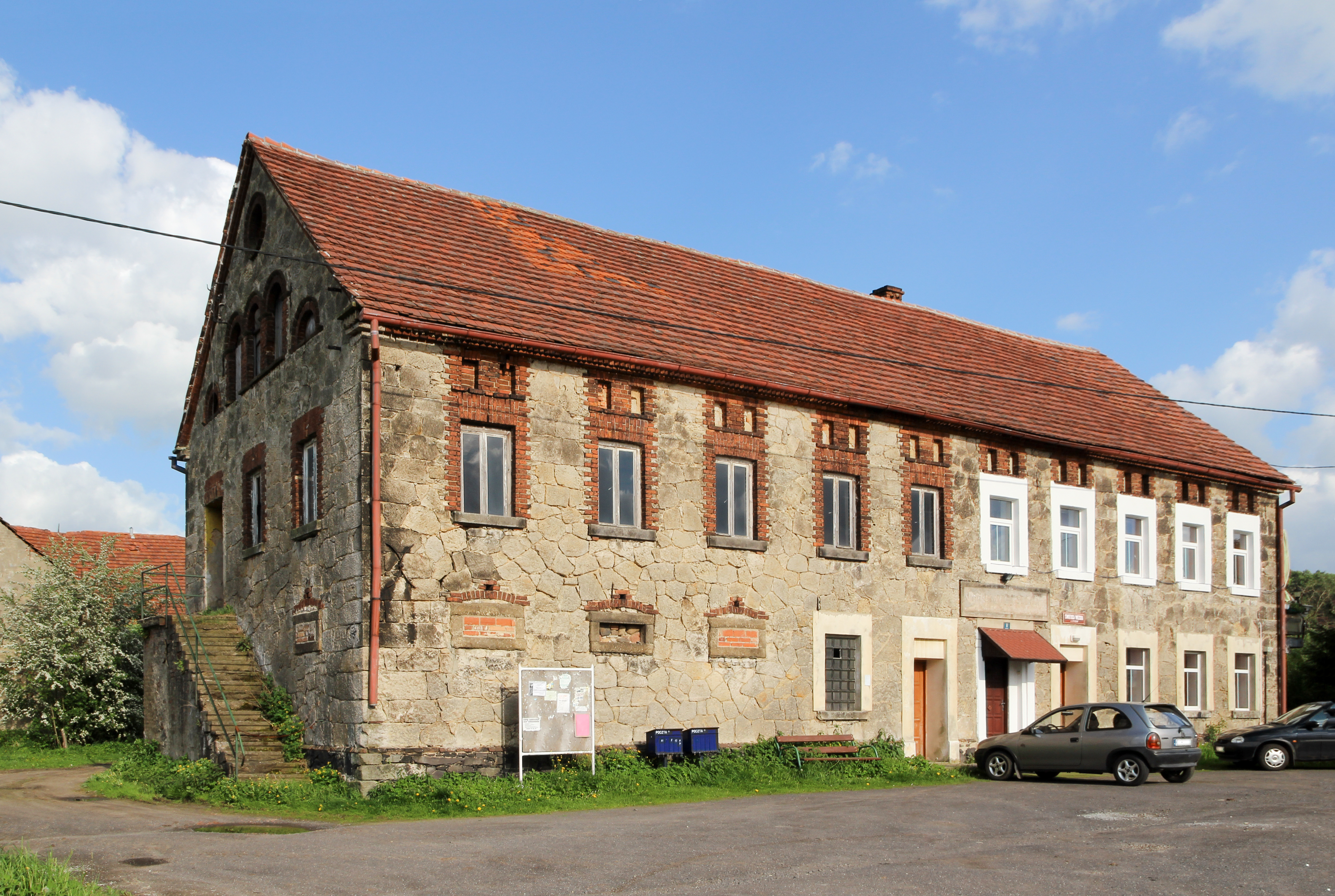
- House in Wyręba

- Location within Poland
- Coordinates: 51°09′44″N 15°10′13″E
- Country: Poland
- Voivodeship: Lower Silesian
- County: Lubań
- Gmina: Siekierczyn

Wyręba [vɨˈrɛmba] (until 1947 Dumna Góra) is a village in the administrative district of Gmina Siekierczyn, within Lubań County, Lower Silesian Voivodeship, in south-western Poland.
