= Wesołówka, Lower Silesian Voivodeship =

Wesołówka
- Village
- Location within Poland
- Coordinates: 51°07′10″N 15°13′15″E
- Country: Poland
- Voivodeship: Lower Silesian
- County: Lubań
- Gmina: Siekierczyn
- Population: 148

Wesołówka [vɛsɔˈwufka] is a village in the administrative district of Gmina Siekierczyn, within Lubań County, Lower Silesian Voivodeship, in south-western Poland.
