= Batowice Lubańskie railway station =

Railway station in Włosień, south-western Poland

Batowice Lubańskie

General information
- Location: Włosień, Lower Silesian Voivodeship; Poland
- Coordinates: 51°05′52.1″N 15°13′05.1″E
- Owner: Polish State Railways
- Line: Wrocław Świebodzki–Zgorzelec railway
- Platforms: 1

History
- Opened: 4 May 1945
- Former names: Batowice (1947–1948)

Services
Preceding station	KD	Following station
Zaręba towards Świeradów-Zdrój or Karpacz	D62	Studniska towards Görlitz
Location
- Location within Poland Location within Lower Silesian Voivodeship

Batowice Lubańskie is a railway station on the Wrocław Świebodzki–Zgorzelec railway in the village of Włosień, Lubań County, within the Lower Silesian Voivodeship in south-western Poland.

== History ==
The station opened as Batowice on 4 May 1947. The name Batowice came from Włosień's temporary name which was used during World War II, however, despite the name of the village changing, the name of the station still remained the same. The following year, it was renamed to Batowice Lubańskie, to designate it from Kraków Batowice.

On 12 December 2021, the station became a request stop of Lower Silesian Railways.
