= Ponikowo =

- Village
- Location within Poland
- Coordinates: 51°05′48″N 15°13′56″E
- Country: Poland
- Voivodeship: Lower Silesian
- County: Lubań
- Gmina: Siekierczyn

Ponikowo [pɔniˈkɔvɔ] is a village in the administrative district of Gmina Siekierczyn, within Lubań County, Lower Silesian Voivodeship, in south-western Poland.
