= Nowa Karczma, Lower Silesian Voivodeship =

Nowa Karczma
- Village
- Location within Poland
- Coordinates: 51°8′51″N 15°10′30″E
- Country: Poland
- Voivodeship: Lower Silesian
- County: Lubań
- Gmina: Siekierczyn

Nowa Karczma [ˈnɔva ˈkart͡ʂma] is a village in the administrative district of Gmina Siekierczyn, within Lubań County, Lower Silesian Voivodeship, in south-western Poland.

Near Nowa Karczma, there is an FM/TV-broadcasting facility, using a 134 metres tall guyed steel tube mast.
