= Pisaczów =

- Village
- Location within Poland
- Coordinates: 51°07′26″N 15°14′19″E
- Country: Poland
- Voivodeship: Lower Silesian
- County: Lubań
- Gmina: Siekierczyn

Pisaczów [piˈsat͡ʂuf] is a village in the administrative district of Gmina Siekierczyn, within Lubań County, Lower Silesian Voivodeship, in south-western Poland.
