= Zaręba =

- Village
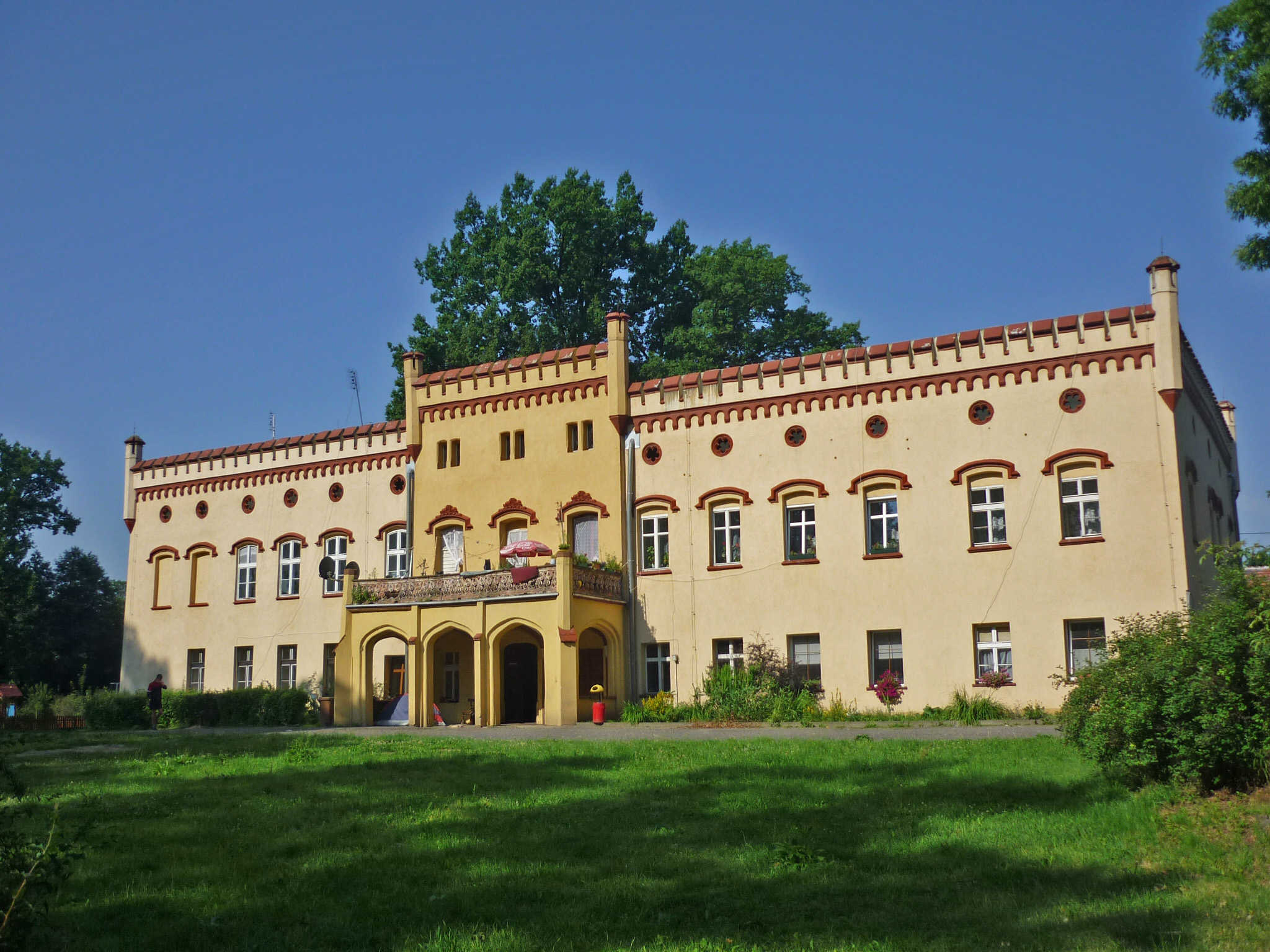
- Palace

- Location within Poland
- Coordinates: 51°06′20″N 15°13′47″E
- Country: Poland
- Voivodeship: Lower Silesian
- County: Lubań
- Gmina: Siekierczyn
- Population: 1,800

Zaręba [zaˈrɛmba] is a village in the administrative district of Gmina Siekierczyn, within Lubań County, Lower Silesian Voivodeship, in south-western Poland. It is served by Zaręba railway station.
