= Siekierczyn =

- Village
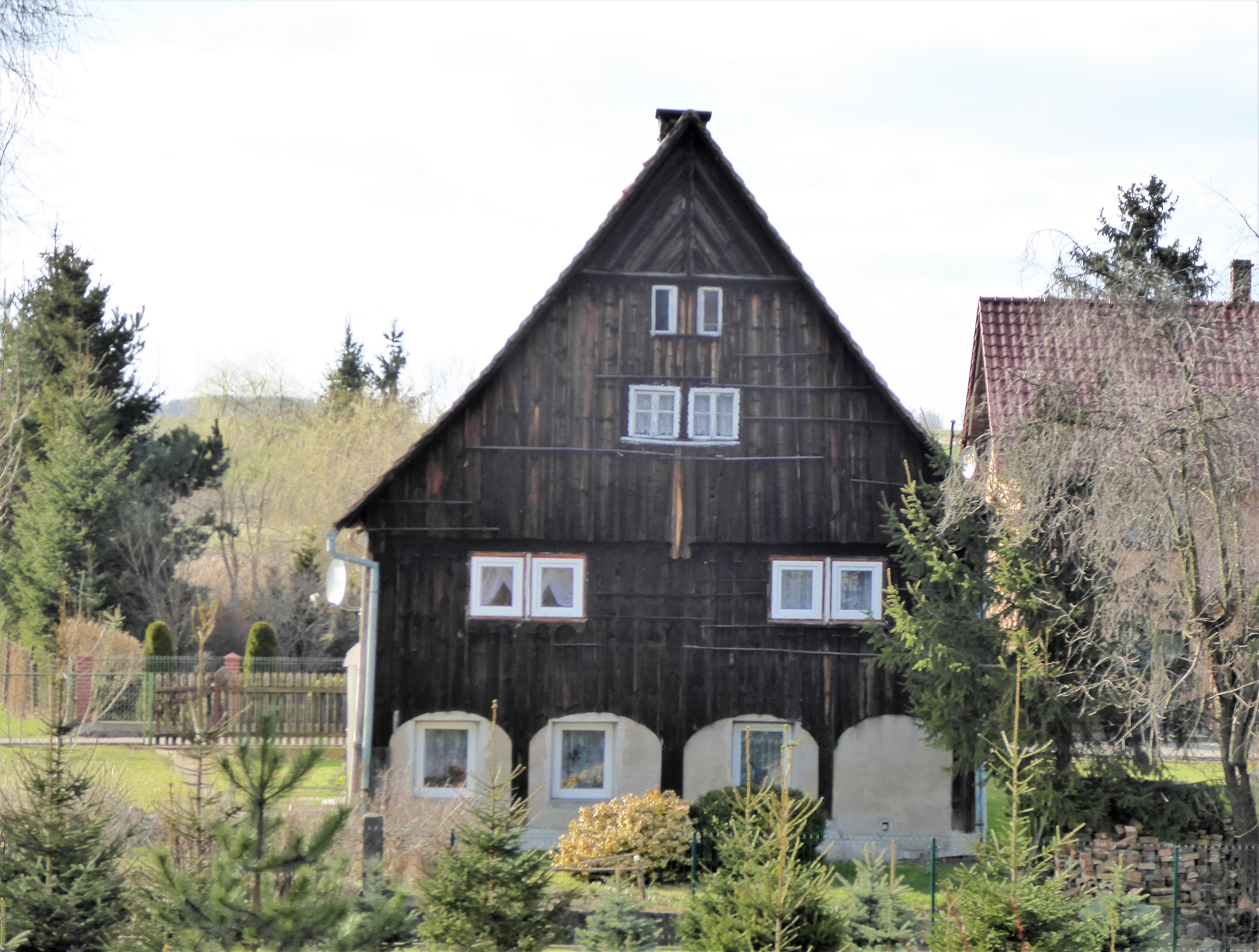

- Location within Poland
- Coordinates: 51°6′N 15°11′E
- Country: Poland
- Voivodeship: Lower Silesian
- County: Lubań
- Gmina: Siekierczyn
- Population (approx.): 1,800

Siekierczyn ([ɕɛˈkʲɛrt͡ʂɨn]) (German: Geibsdorf) is a village in Lubań County, Lower Silesian Voivodeship, in south-western Poland. It is the seat of the administrative district (gmina) called Gmina Siekierczyn.
