= Lyuban =

Lyuban may refer to:

- Lyuban, Belarus, a town in Minsk Oblast, Belarus
- Lyuban district, Belarus
- Lyuban, Russia, name of several inhabited localities in Russia
- Lyuban, Vileyka district rural council, Belarus

== See also ==
- Lubań, name of several inhabited localities in Poland
