= Studniska Dolne =

- Village
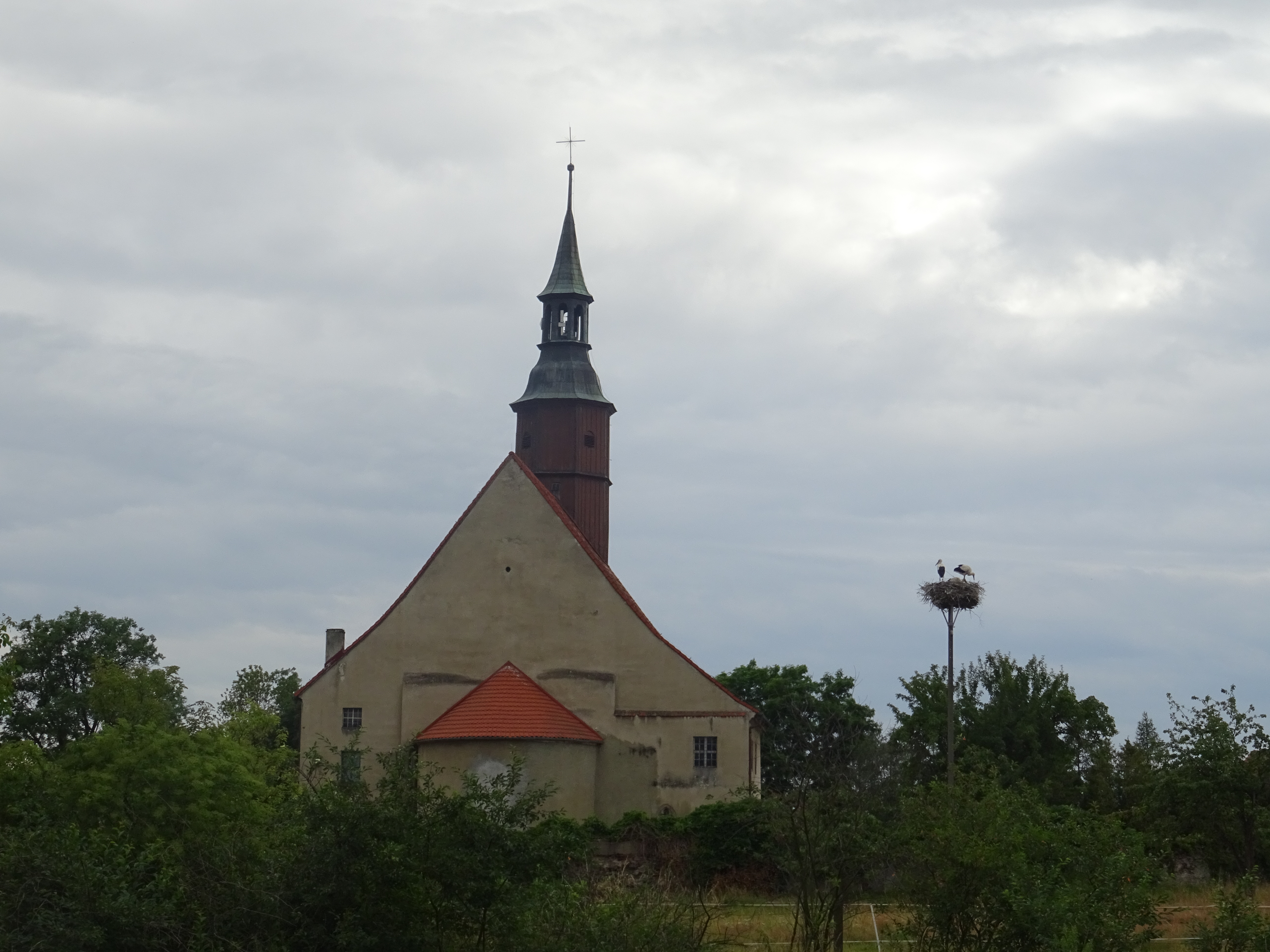
- Village church

- Location within Poland
- Coordinates: 51°06′10″N 15°03′42″E
- Country: Poland
- Voivodeship: Lower Silesian
- County: Zgorzelec
- Gmina: Sulików
- Population: 670

Studniska Dolne [studˈniska ˈdɔlnɛ] (Upper Sorbian: Delni Studniska) is a village in the administrative district of Gmina Sulików, within Zgorzelec County, Lower Silesian Voivodeship, in south-western Poland, close to the Czech border.

== Gallery ==
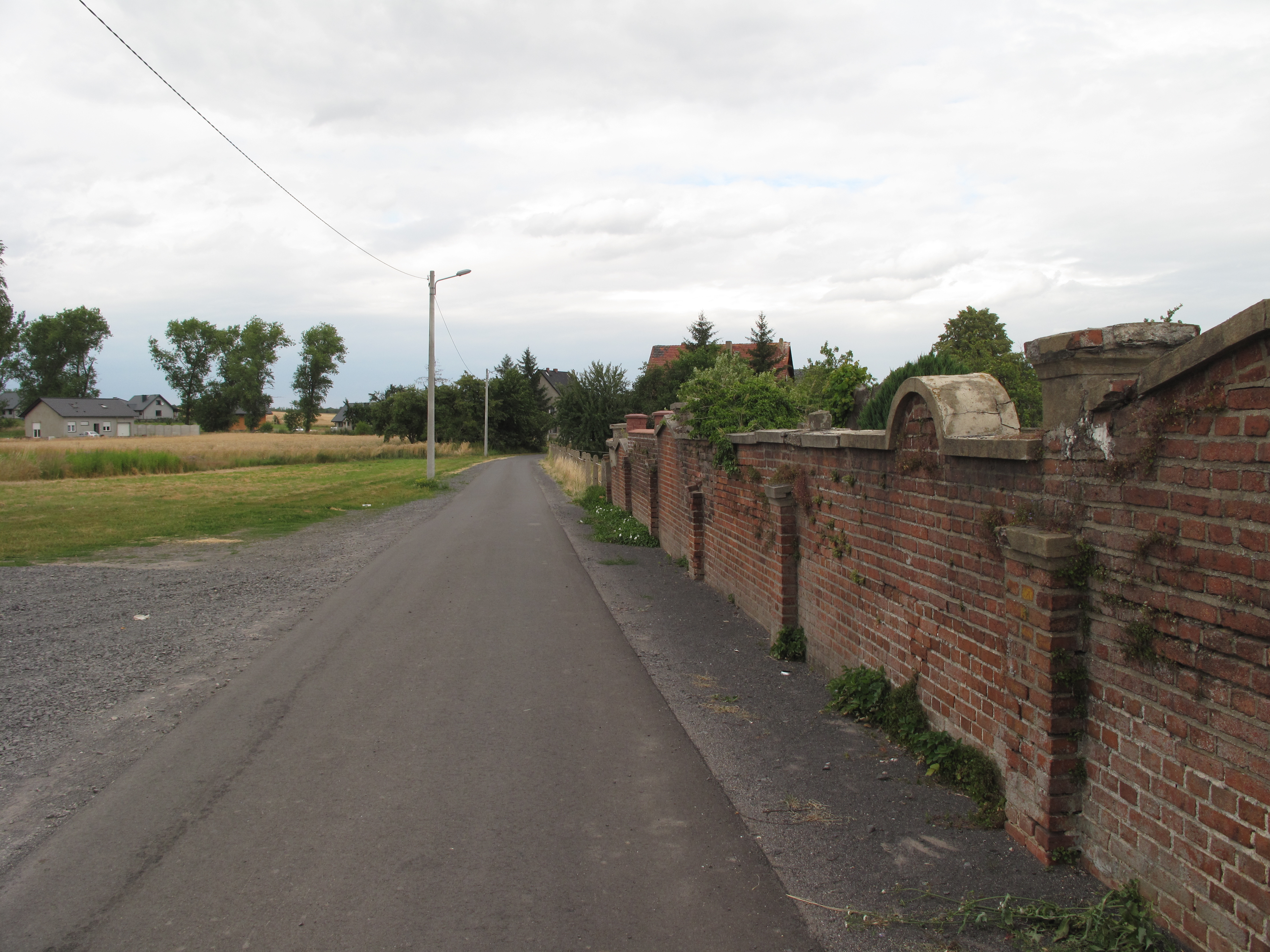
Wall of the cemetery

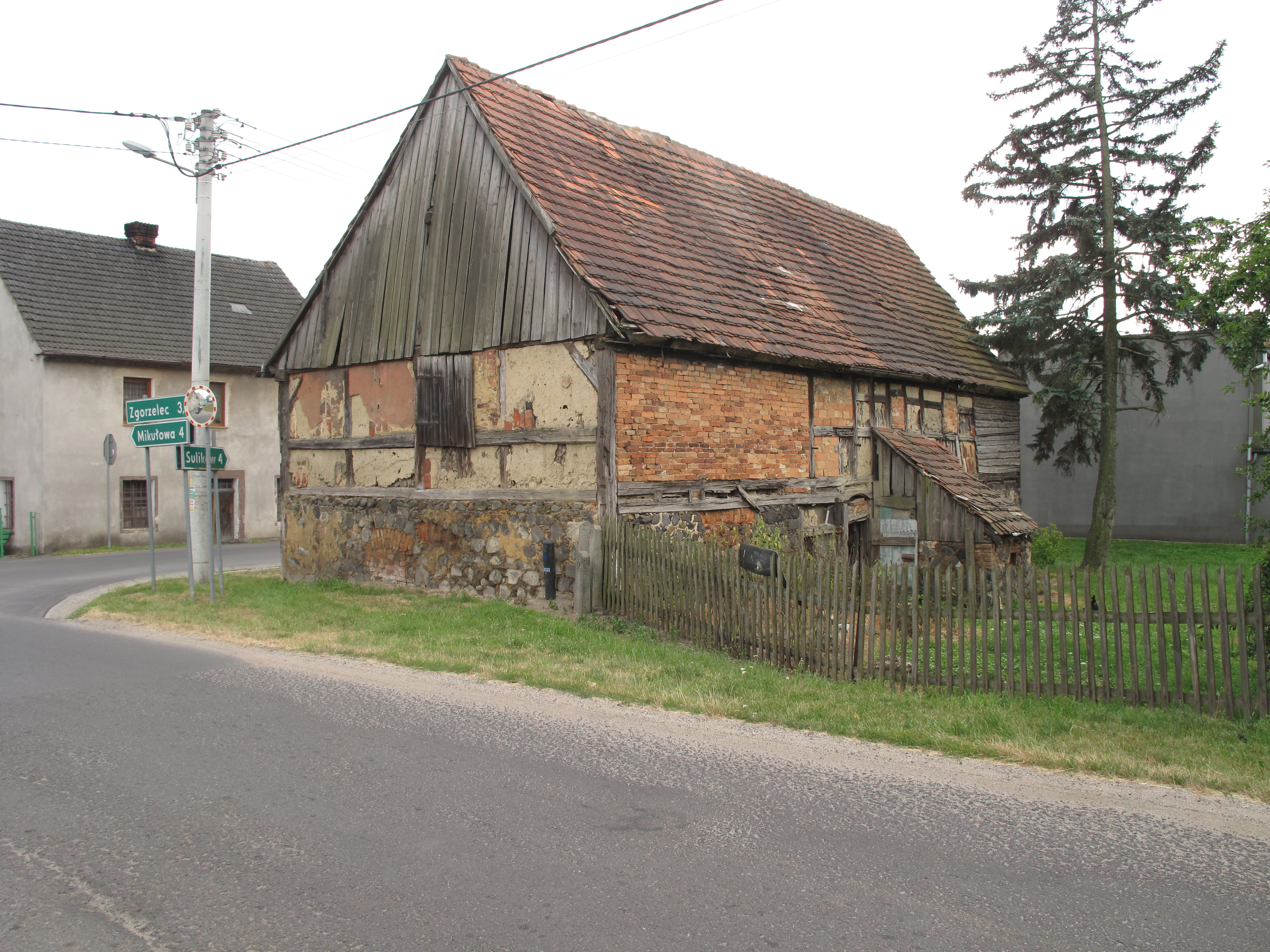
Old barn on the cross roads

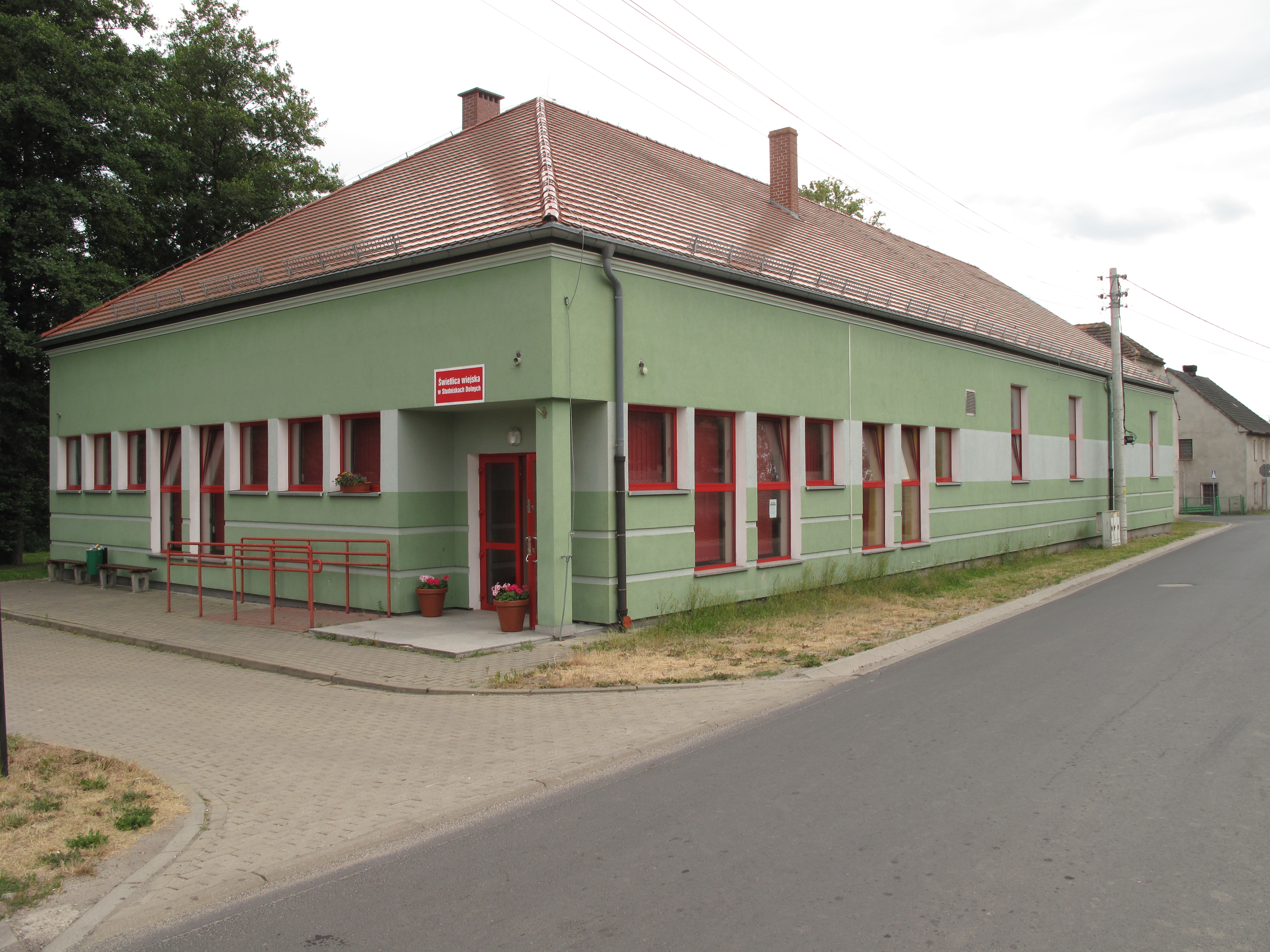
Community house

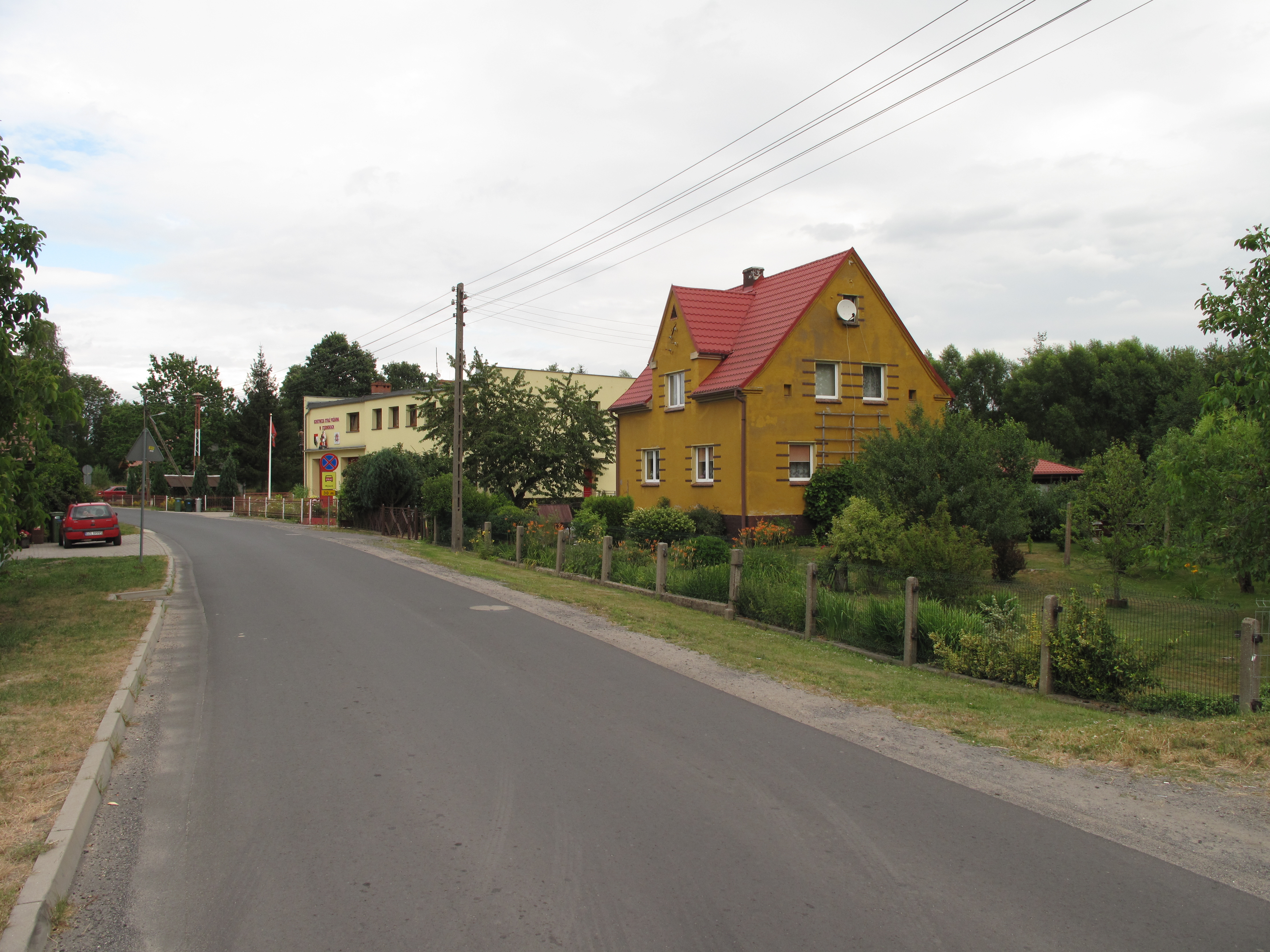
Houses by road
