= Mikułowa =

- Village
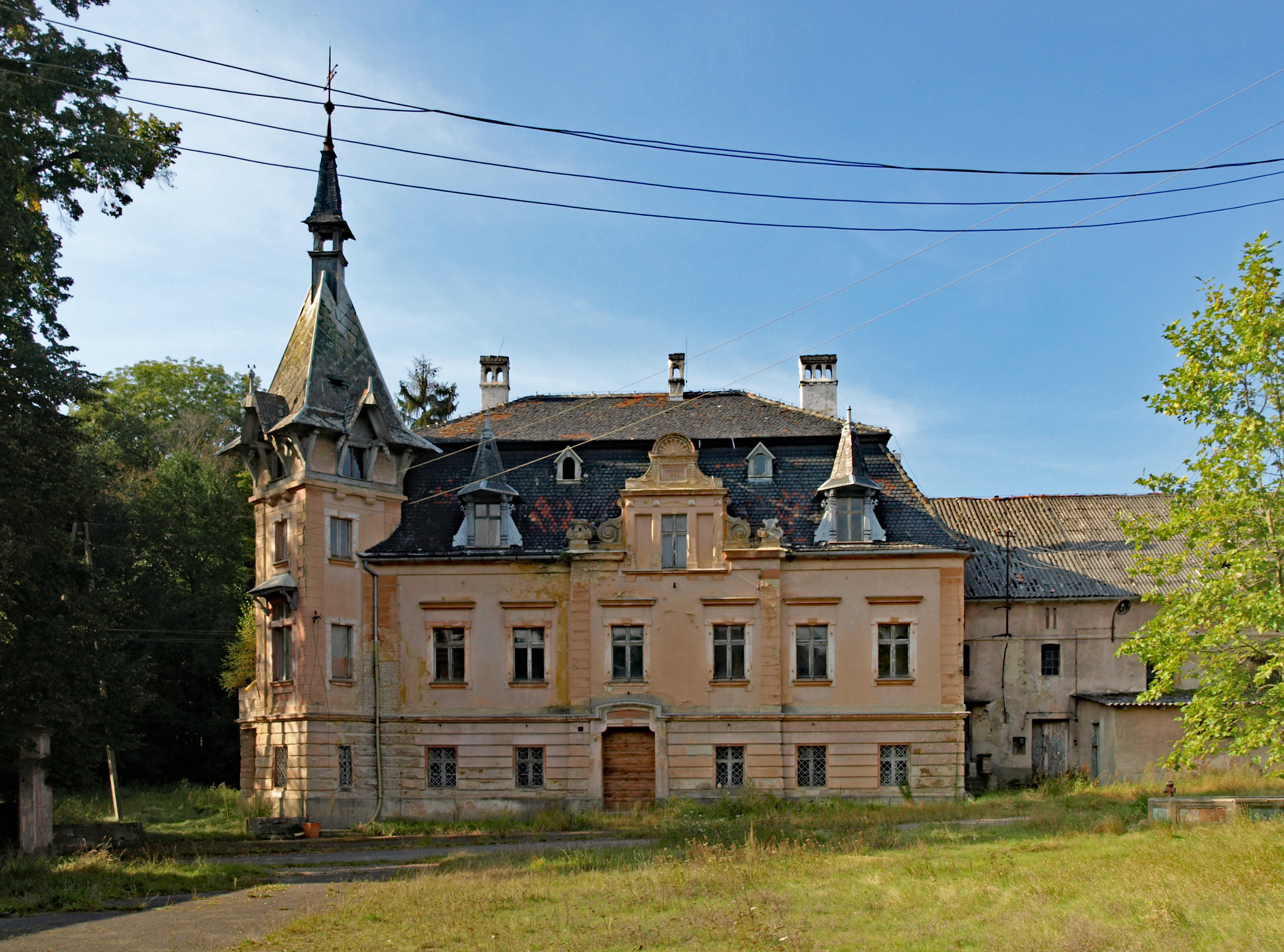

- Location within Poland
- Coordinates: 51°6′N 15°7′E
- Country: Poland
- Voivodeship: Lower Silesian
- County: Zgorzelec
- Gmina: Sulików

Mikułowa [mikuˈwɔva] is a village in the administrative district of Gmina Sulików, within Zgorzelec County, Lower Silesian Voivodeship, in south-western Poland, close to the Czech border. It is home to the Mikułowa railway station that was closed on 13 December 2025.
