= Silesian Mountain Railway =

Railway line in Poland

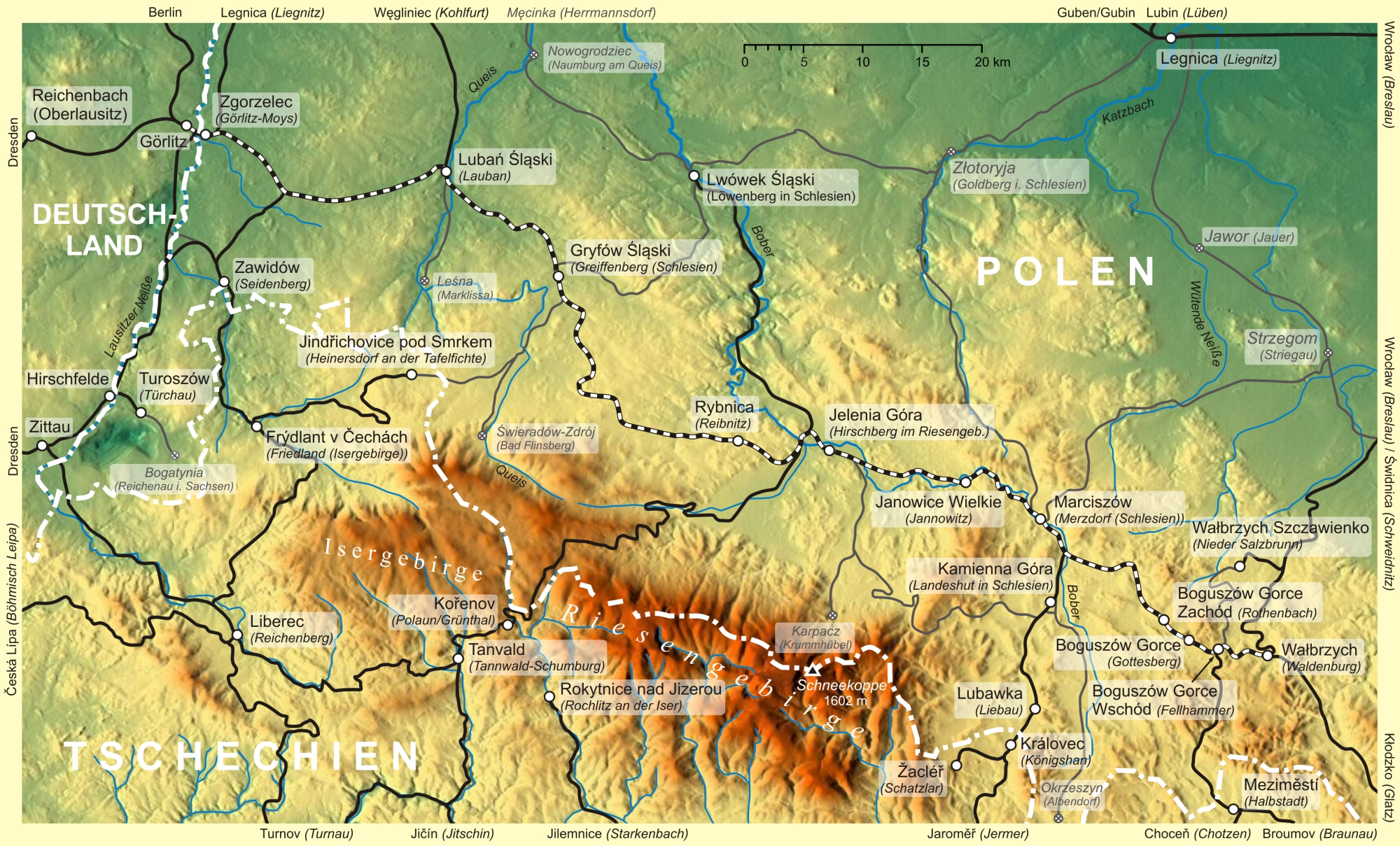

Overview
- Native name: Śląska Kolej Górska
- Line number: 240
- Locale: Lower Silesian Voivodeship, Poland
- Termini: Zgorzelec; Wałbrzych

Service
- Route number: PLK 274

Technical
- Line length: 196.1 km (121.9 mi)
- Number of tracks: 2
- Track gauge: 1,435 mm (4 ft 8 1/2 in) standard gauge
- Electrification: 1923–1945: 15 kV 16⅔ Hz AC; since 1965: 3 kV DC
- Operating speed: maximum speed: 140 km/h (87.0 mph)

The Silesian Mountain Railway (Polish: Śląska Kolej Górska; German: Schlesische Gebirgsbahn) is a historic railway line in south-west Poland. It leads from Görlitz/Zgorzelec on the Lusatian Neisse via Jelenia Góra to Wałbrzych in Lower Silesia, designated as the Wrocław Świebodzki–Zgorzelec Railway.

The first plans for connection of Görlitz with Waldenburg (Wałbrzych) via Hirschberg (Jelenia Góra) and further to Glatz (Kłodzko) appeared in 1853. The Kingdom of Prussia intended to build a direct railway link from Berlin to Vienna, bypassing the Kingdom of Saxony. However, the Austrian Empire did not favor a construction major railway line running parallel to its border.

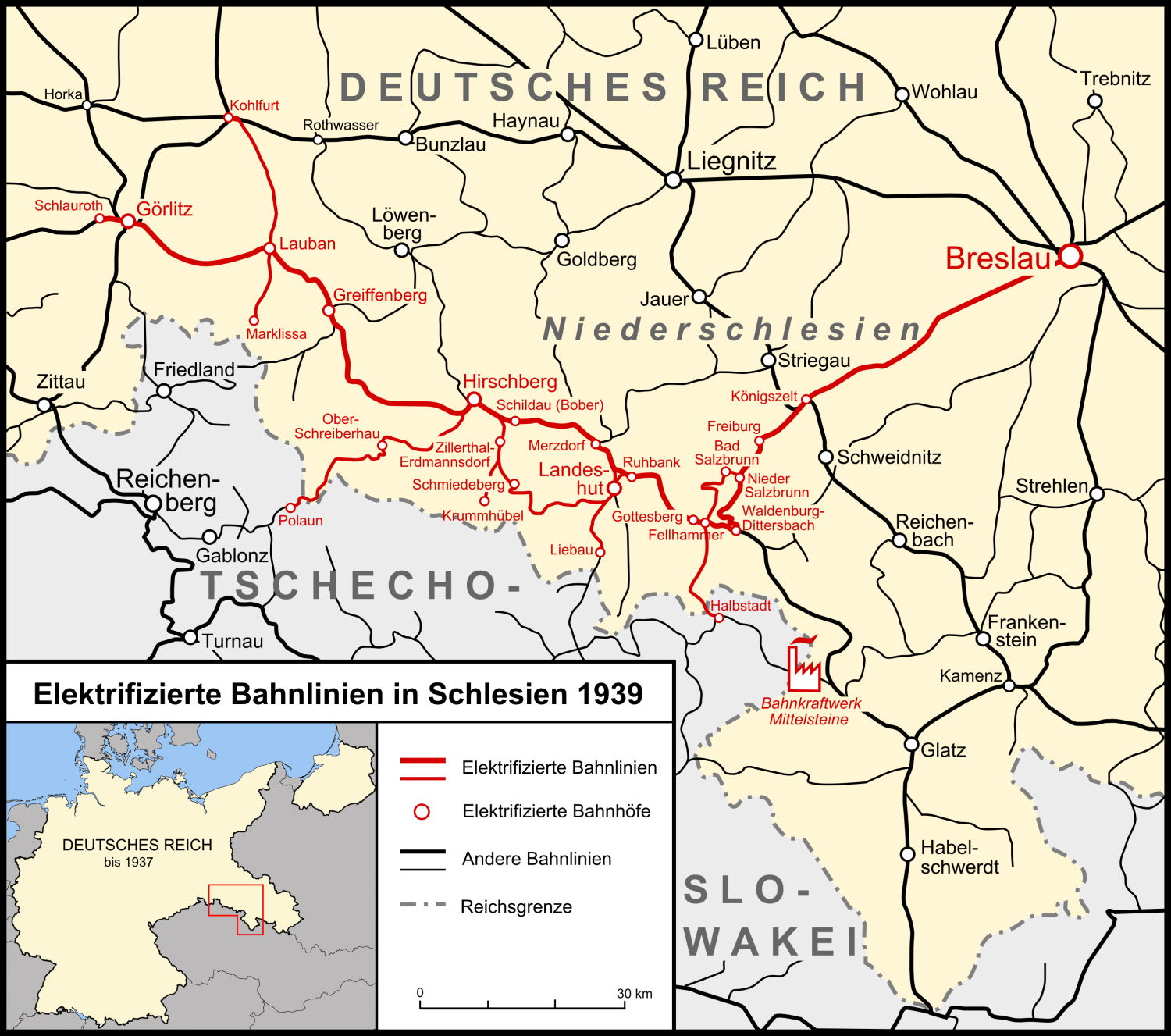
Rail network in and around Lower Silesia, lines electrified by 1939 in red.

As the industrialization of Germany progressed, the original plan was reconsidered several years later. On 24 September 1862, the Prussian parliament approved the construction of a railway line from Görlitz to Waldenburg with a branch line to Kohlfurt (Węgliniec). The line was built stepwise; the last section was opened on 16 August 1867. The first section was electrified by 1915. Due to the First World War, the electrification was not finished until 1 September 1923.

The railway was one of the first German electrified lines. Before the Second World War, it was used to transport vast amounts of Silesian hard coal to Saxony and the Province of Brandenburg. The railway was included in Polish territory in 1945 according to the post-war Potsdam Agreement.
