= Świeradów-Zdrój railway station =

Railway station in Świeradów-Zdrój, south-western Poland

Świeradów-Zdrój
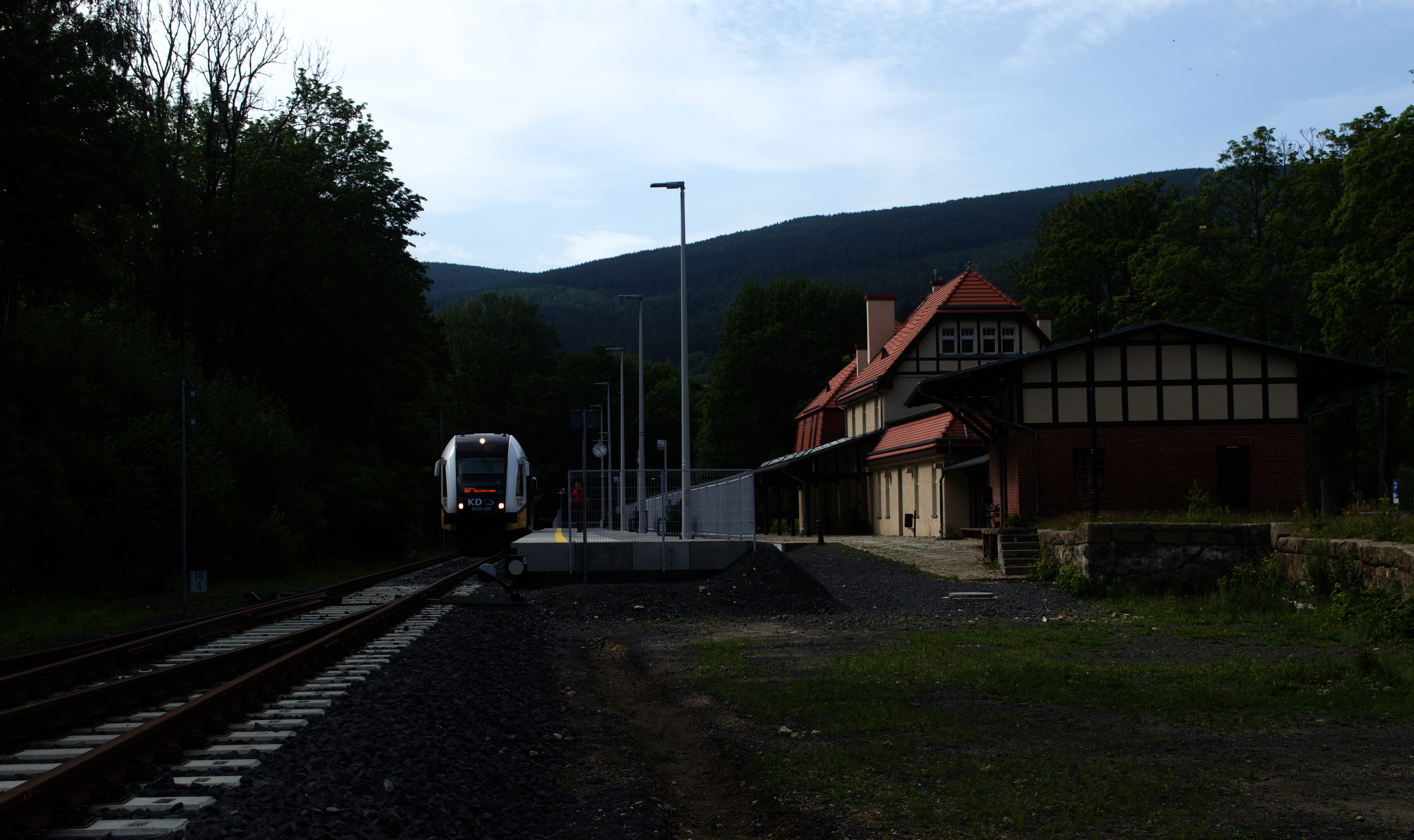
- Station in June 2024

General information
- Location: 1 Dworcowa Street, Świeradów-Zdrój, Lower Silesian Voivodeship; Poland
- Coordinates: 50°54′41.2″N 15°20′35.8″E
- Owner: Lower Silesian Road and Railway Authority
- Lines: Gryfów Śląski–Świeradów-Zdrój railway; Mirsk–Świeradów Nadleśnictwo railway
- Platforms: 1

History
- Opened: 31 October 1909
- Former names: Bad Flinsberg (1909–1945); Włyńsk (1945–1946); Świeradów Zdrój (1946–2023)

Services
Preceding station	KD	Following station
Terminus	D62	Orłowice towards Görlitz
Location
- Location within Poland Location within Lower Silesian Voivodeship

Świeradów-Zdrój (German: Bad Flinsberg) is a railway station in the town of Świeradów-Zdrój, Lubań County, within the Lower Silesian Voivodeship in south-western Poland.

Once one of the most important railway stations of the Mirsk–Świeradów Nadleśnictwo railway, it was opened on 31 October 1909 with the launch of the railway line from Mirsk. It initially served passenger traffic until 11 February 1996, and in 1998, freight services were suspended. In 2012, the station's buildings became the property of the town, and between 2018 and 2019, they underwent revitalization and adaptation for museum and cultural purposes. On 10 December 2023, after the revitalization of the Gryfów Śląski–Świeradów-Zdrój line, regular passenger connections were reinstated, and Świeradów-Zdrój became the last stop on the Gryfów Śląski–Świeradów-Zdrój railway.

== Location ==
Świeradów-Zdrój railway station is located in the eastern part of the town of Świeradów-Zdrój, on Dworcowa Street, to the east of provincial road No. 358, approximately 500 m (1,600 ft) from Zdrojowa Street. Administratively, it is situated in the Lower Silesian Voivodeship, in the Lubań County.

The station is located at an altitude of 460 m (1,510 ft) above sea level.

== History ==
=== Mirsk–Świeradów Nadleśnictwo railway (until 1945) ===
The establishment of the station in Świeradów-Zdrój was linked to the construction of the railway line from Mirsk, with the first proposal for its construction being made in 1901. However, the construction of the line was eventually initiated privately in March 1908. The construction plan included the establishment of a railway station, which was to be the largest of its kind along the later Mirsk–Świeradów Nadleśnictwo railway, and architecturally, it was to reflect the spa architecture of the town. Additionally, the construction of a transshipment ramp, warehouse, and storage yard was planned, as it was expected that large quantities of building materials would be delivered for the expanding spa resort at the time.

The line to Świeradów-Zdrój was completed on 1 October 1909, and the official opening took place on October 31 of the same year. The extension of the line to Świeradów Nadleśnictwo was put into regular service on 5 June 1910. The main direction of trains until 1945 was the station in Mirsk, where passengers would transfer to state-run trains. Most of these trains were connected with the trains of the Mirsk–Świeradów Nadleśnictwo railway.

=== After 1945 ===
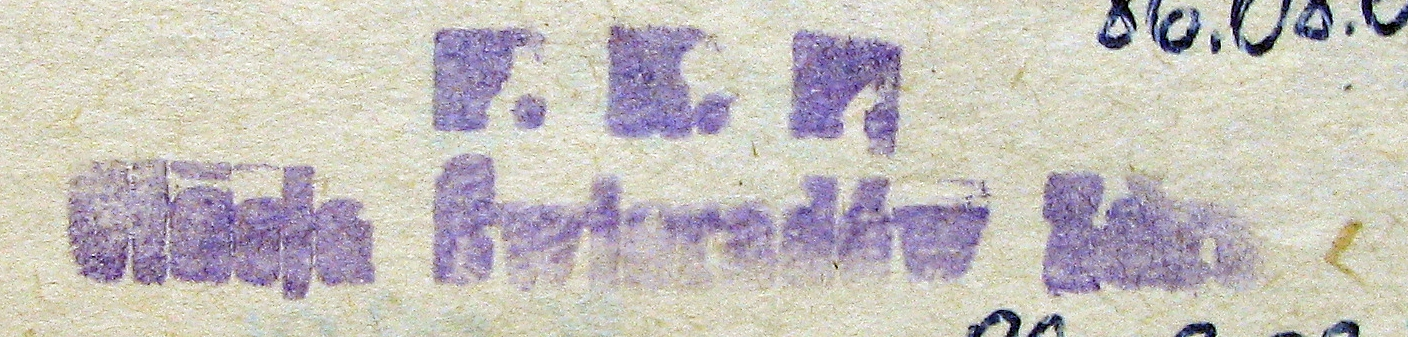
Stamp of the station from 1986

After World War II, the entire infrastructure of the former station was taken over by the Polish State Railways. The Polish railway workers took control of the station in September 1945, and the first train after the reconstruction of the bridge over the Kwisa river arrived in Świeradów-Zdrój on 18 December 1946. The ceremoniously decorated train was led by the mayor of Mirsk, Ludwik Żak. At that time, regional train routes were extended from Świeradów-Zdrój, which previously ended at the Mirsk junction station and were now primarily running to Legnica via Gryfów Śląski and Lwówek Śląski.

The last passenger train from Świeradów-Zdrój station departed on 11 February 1996, and freight trains continued to operate for the next two years.

==== Revitalization of the railway station building ====
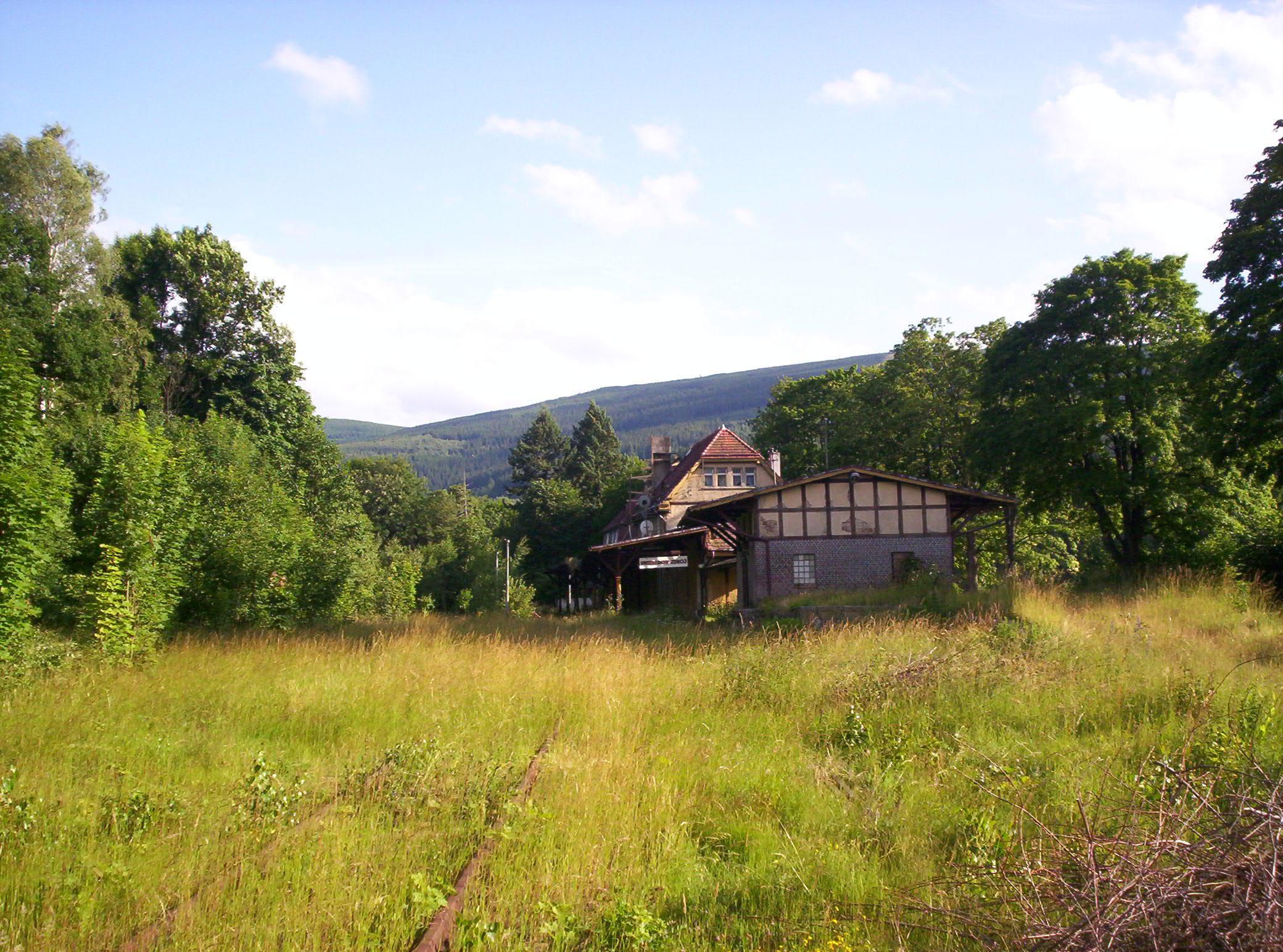
Świeradów-Zdrój in 2008

In 2008, the idea of transferring the railway line running through the town of Świeradów-Zdrój to the town's authorities was initiated. The project proposed transferring the railway station along with a section of track 3.5 km (2.2 mi) long and an area of approximately 10 hectares (the Świeradów-Zdrój–Świeradów Nadleśnictwo route). Initially, the town was to take over the section for the value of scrap metal from the entire route in the town (around 250,000 PLN), but Polish State Railways withdrew from this plan and offered the town the entire infrastructure for the cost of notary services. The notarial deed regarding the transfer of the station and the discussed section of the line was signed on 27 December 2012. As part of the transfer, the railway tracks were dismantled, as the town would have had to pay an additional 500,000 PLN if it had agreed to leave the tracks in place.

In early May 2013, the dismantling of the tracks at the loading yard area began, and on 10 December 2015, the town-owned station building and warehouse were entered into the register of historic buildings.

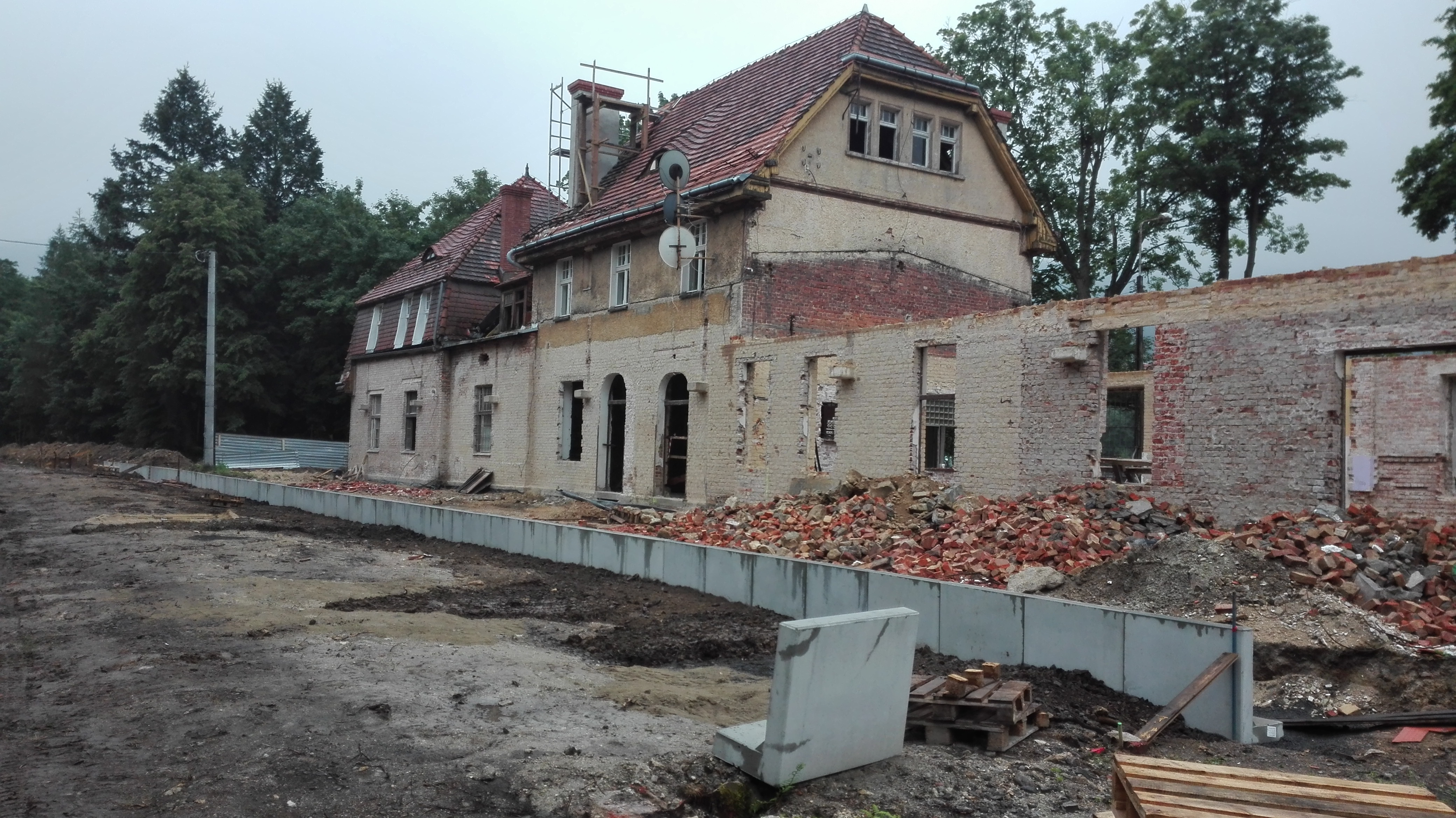
Station building during revitalization in June 2018

In mid-February 2016, the town authorities applied for EU funding for the revitalization project of the former Świeradów-Zdrój station complex. The project proposed introducing a museum function in the station building with a model showing the railway layout in the Jizera Mountains region, as well as a cultural function, including a room for cultural meetings, a music hall, a photography room, and space for non-governmental organizations. The entire station building was also to receive new illumination. In mid-March 2017, the town of Świeradów-Zdrój was granted a EU subsidy of 2.9 million PLN, and the total value of the project was estimated at 3.5 million PLN.

On 12 January 2018, the town of Świeradów-Zdrój announced a tender for the adaptation of the railway station building and its surroundings into a museum and cultural center. However, due to the fact that the amounts proposed by the companies bidding for the project exceeded the budget allocated for the work, the tender was canceled on 15 March 2018. A new tender process was announced on 15 February 2018. The amounts proposed by the contractors again exceeded the budget for the work (4.2 million PLN of the 3 million PLN allocated for the investment), but this time, on 13 March 2018, a contractor was selected for the work.

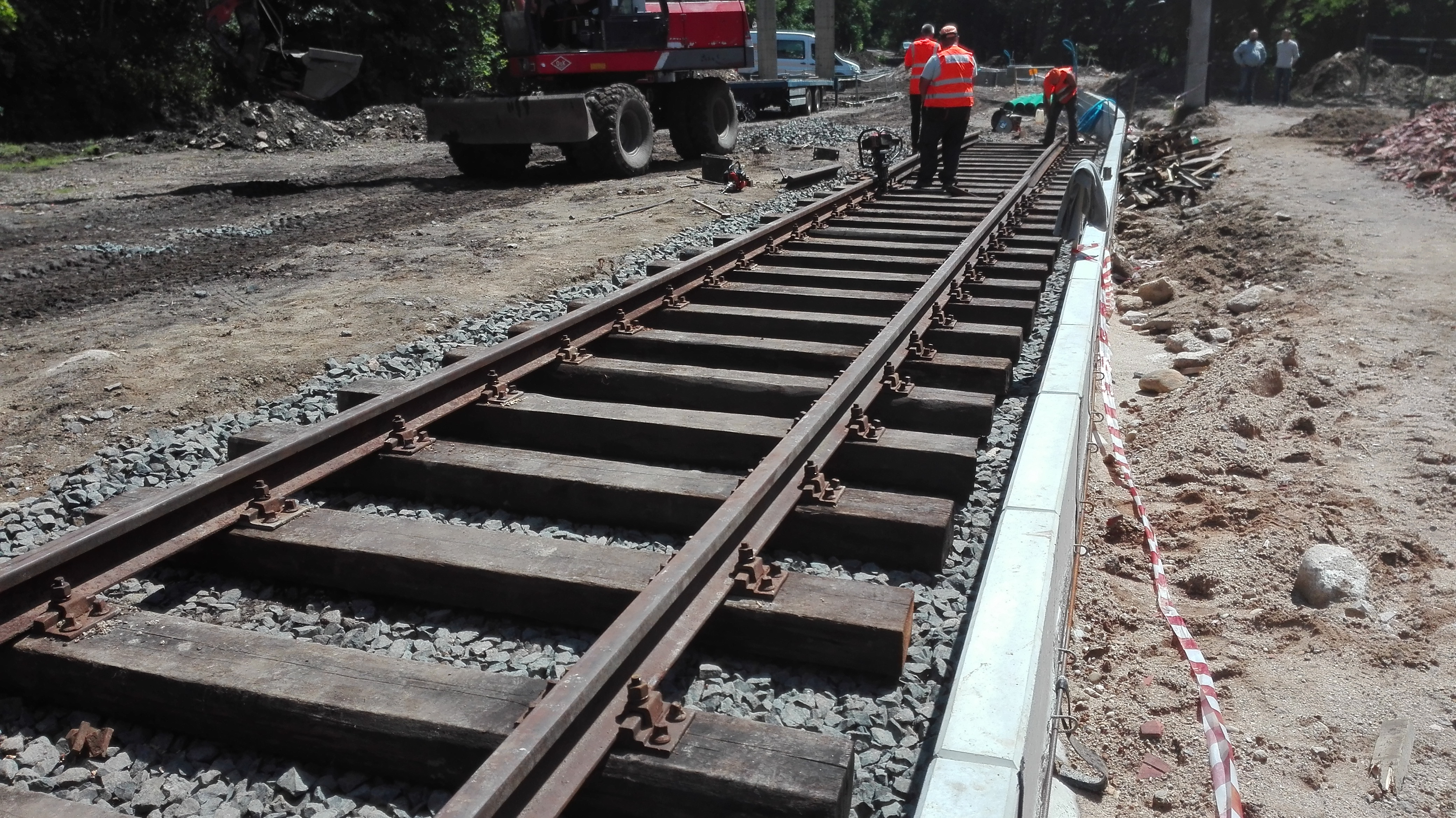
New track for locomotive exhibit under construction in June 2018

The contract for the work was signed on 23 March 2018. The revitalization works included demolition, installation of structures and new roofing, masonry, renovation work, and site development. On 11 May 2018, a tender was announced for the construction of the model, and efforts were made to obtain historic locomotives and carriages for the outdoor exhibition. By July, the track for the exhibition of historic rolling stock was ready, and by September 2018, half of the planned work had been completed, including the new roof, windows, and facade, as well as external installations. On 1 March 2019, the renewed railway station building opened the Municipal Cultural Center, Activity, and Promotion of the Commune Stacja Kultury in Świeradów-Zdrój.

==== Reconstruction of the railway connection ====
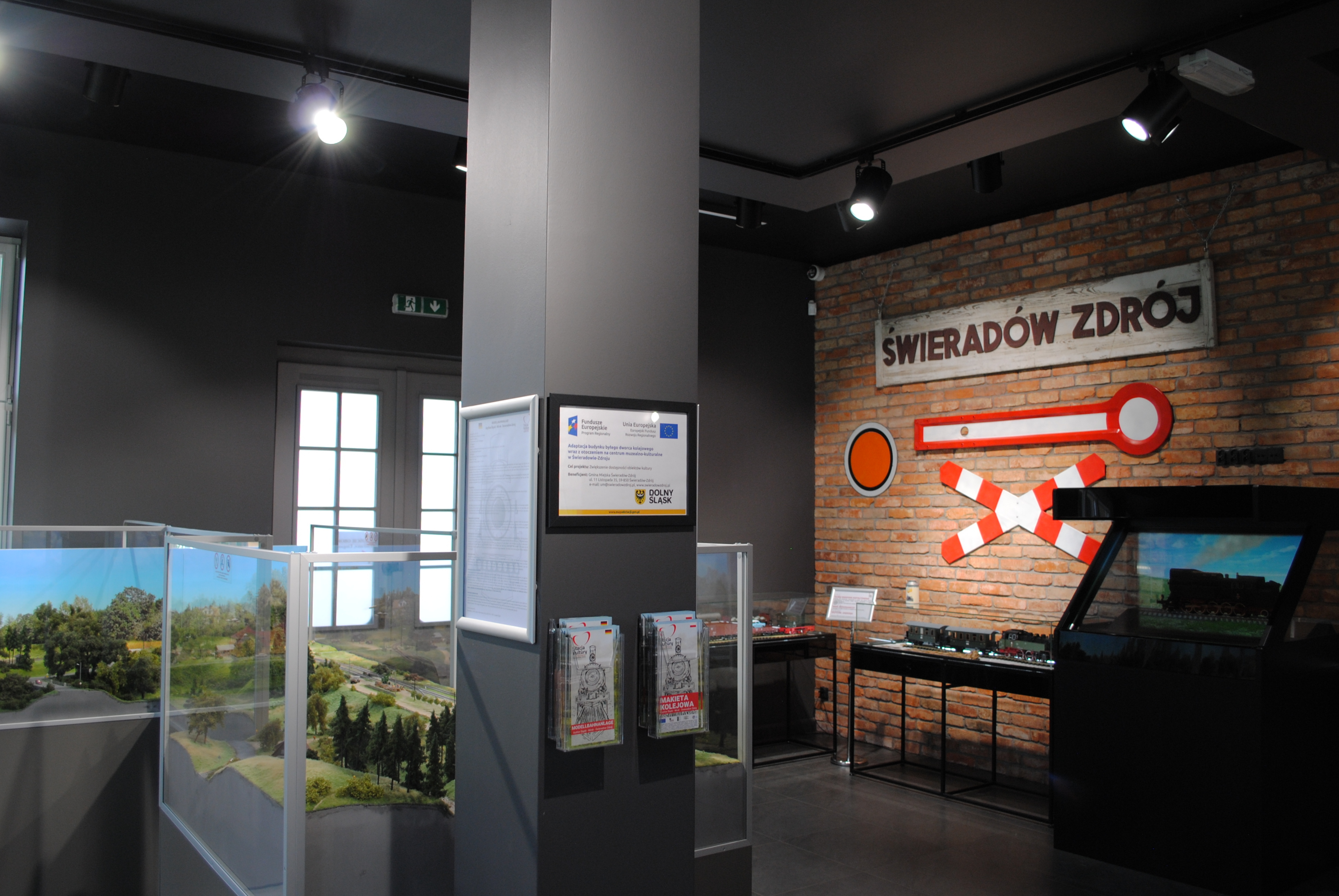
Exhibit inside the railway station building with a railway model

In mid-2014, the Marshal's Office of the Lower Silesian Voivodeship returned to the concept of taking over railway lines for revitalization and reactivation, including lines 317 and 336 Gryfów Śląski–Mirsk–Świeradów Zdrój. On 8 June 2020, a notarial deed was signed, by which the Lower Silesian Voivodeship took over both railway lines from the Polish State Railways.

On 1 June 2022, the town of Świeradów-Zdrój announced a tender for the reconstruction of the track near the railway station. The project planned the construction of approximately 1 km (0.62 mi) of railway track and a platform on the plot near the station, towards Orłowice. The stop was also to be adapted to accommodate trains with a bicycle carriage. Work on the project began in early October 2023.

On 7 December 2023, a ceremony was held to open the railway line to Świeradów-Zdrój – the first train reached the final stop at 1:00 PM. The first regular passenger connections on the line began on 10 December 2023. This marked the return of passenger railway services to Świeradów-Zdrój after 27 years. During this period, the revitalized railway line was assigned a unified number – 317, and the Świeradów Zdrój station was renamed to Świeradów-Zdrój.

== Infrastructure ==
=== Railway lines and platforms ===
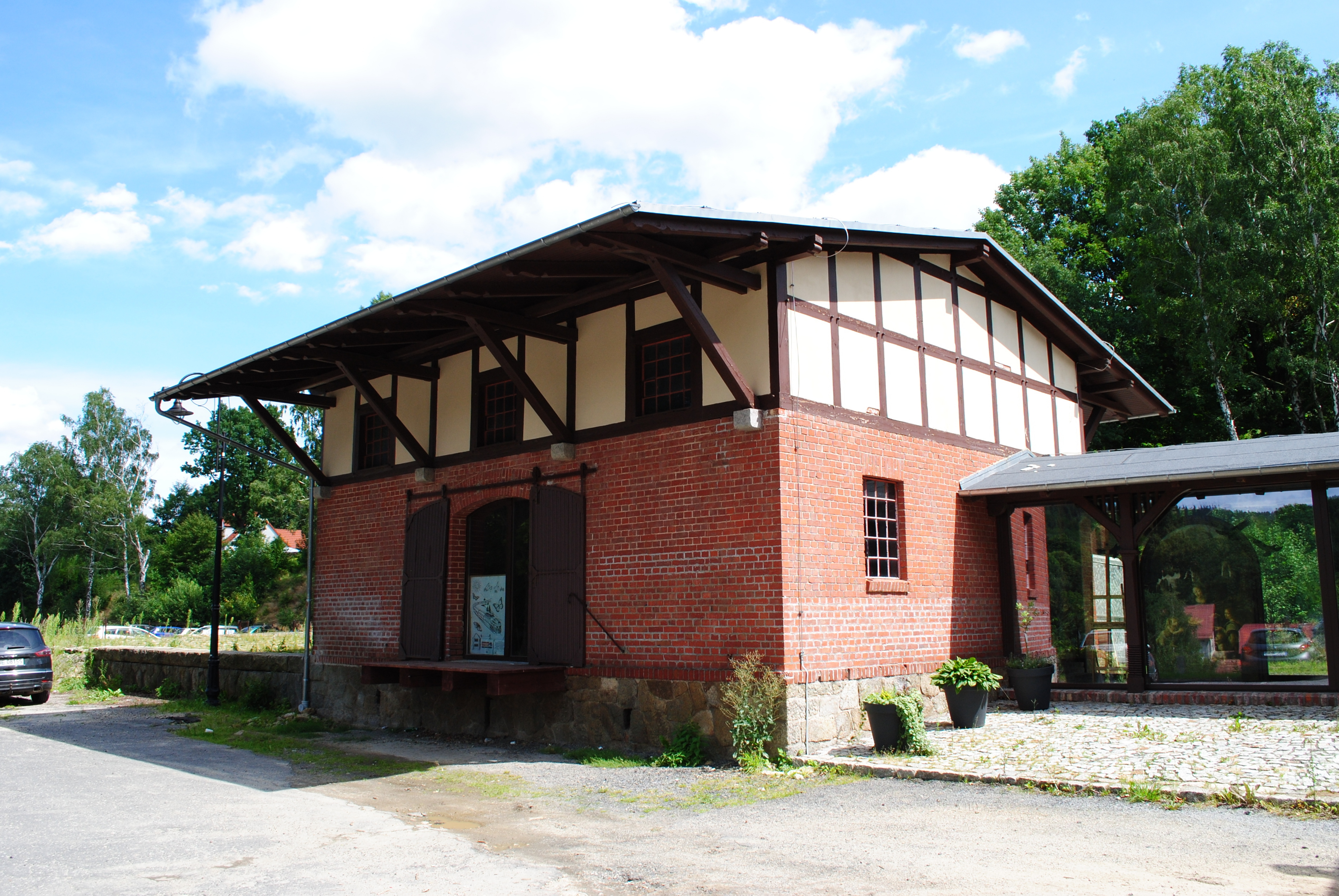
Former warehouse building

Świeradów-Zdrój was originally the 4th railway control point on Mirsk–Świeradów Nadleśnictwo railway (7.701 km), and since 2023, it has been the 6th control point (16.494 km) on Gryfów Śląski–Świeradów-Zdrój railway. This line, along with the stop, is under the management of the Lower Silesian Roads and Railways Service in Wrocław.

The Świeradów-Zdrój station consists of a single-edge platform that is 85 m (279 ft), 55 cm (22 in) high, and 4 m (13 ft) wide. It is equipped with information boards, lighting, and monitoring. An 85 m (279 ft) passing loop is located towards Orłowice.

Originally, there was a main platform 6 m (20 ft) wide and a 3 m (9.8 ft) wide island platform. The original track layout consisted of a main track, an additional main track, and 4 side tracks, including 2 freight tracks.

=== Railway station ===
The historic railway station at the Świeradów-Zdrój stop is located at 1 Dworcowa Street and was built along with the construction of the railway line between 1909 and 1911. Originally, the building was equipped with ticket offices, a restaurant, office spaces, service apartments, guest rooms, and was also supplied with electricity, water, and sewage. Later, it underwent renovations. The building also housed the switch tower.

The building, along with the warehouse and the connector between the two buildings, is listed in the register of immovable monuments of the Lower Silesian Voivodeship under number A/5987. It serves as the seat of the cultural institution – the Municipal Cultural Center, Activity, and Promotion of the Gmina Stacja Kultury in Świeradów-Zdrój.

Historic railway station at the Świeradów-Zdrój stop in 2021

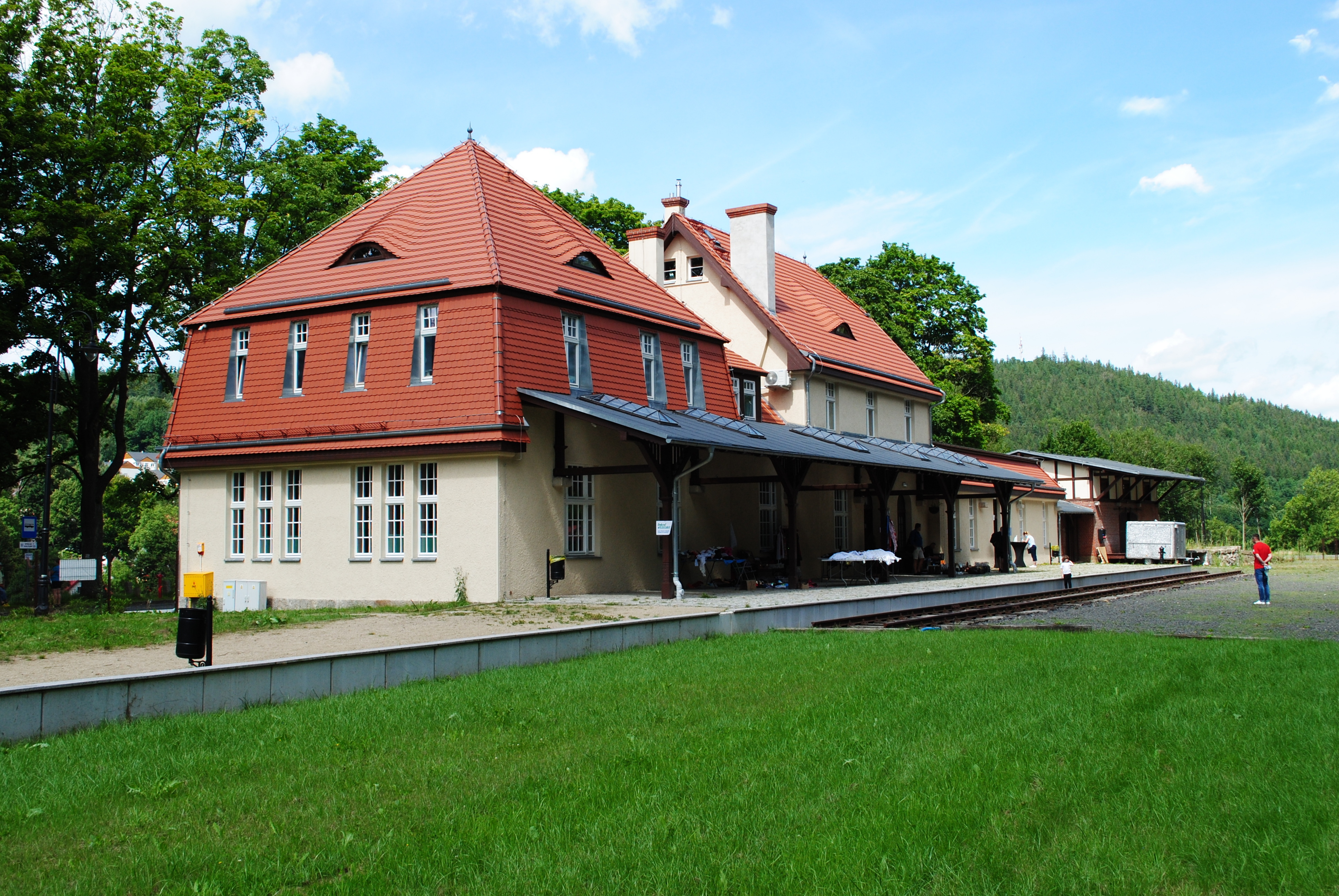
Station from the southeast

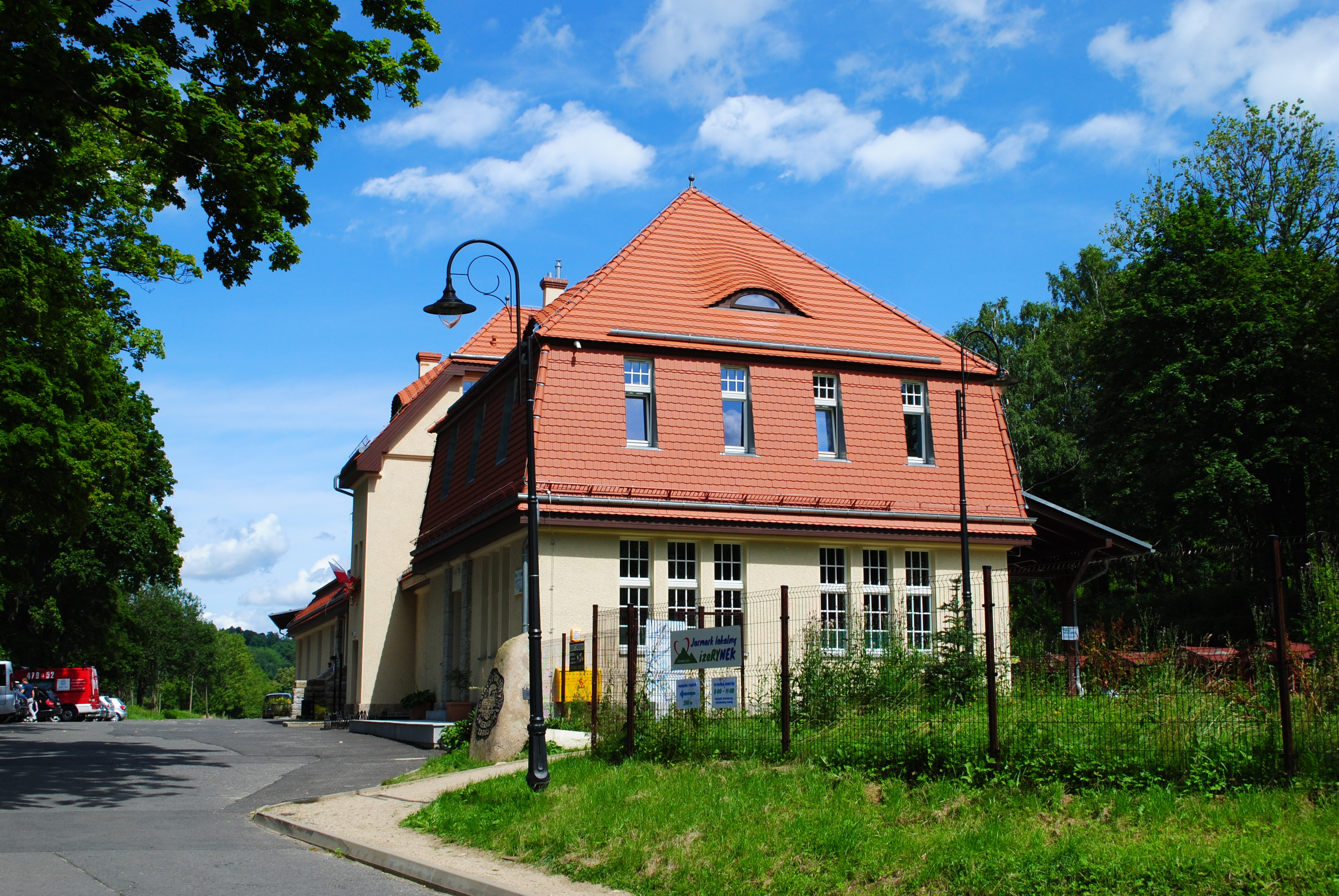
Station from the south

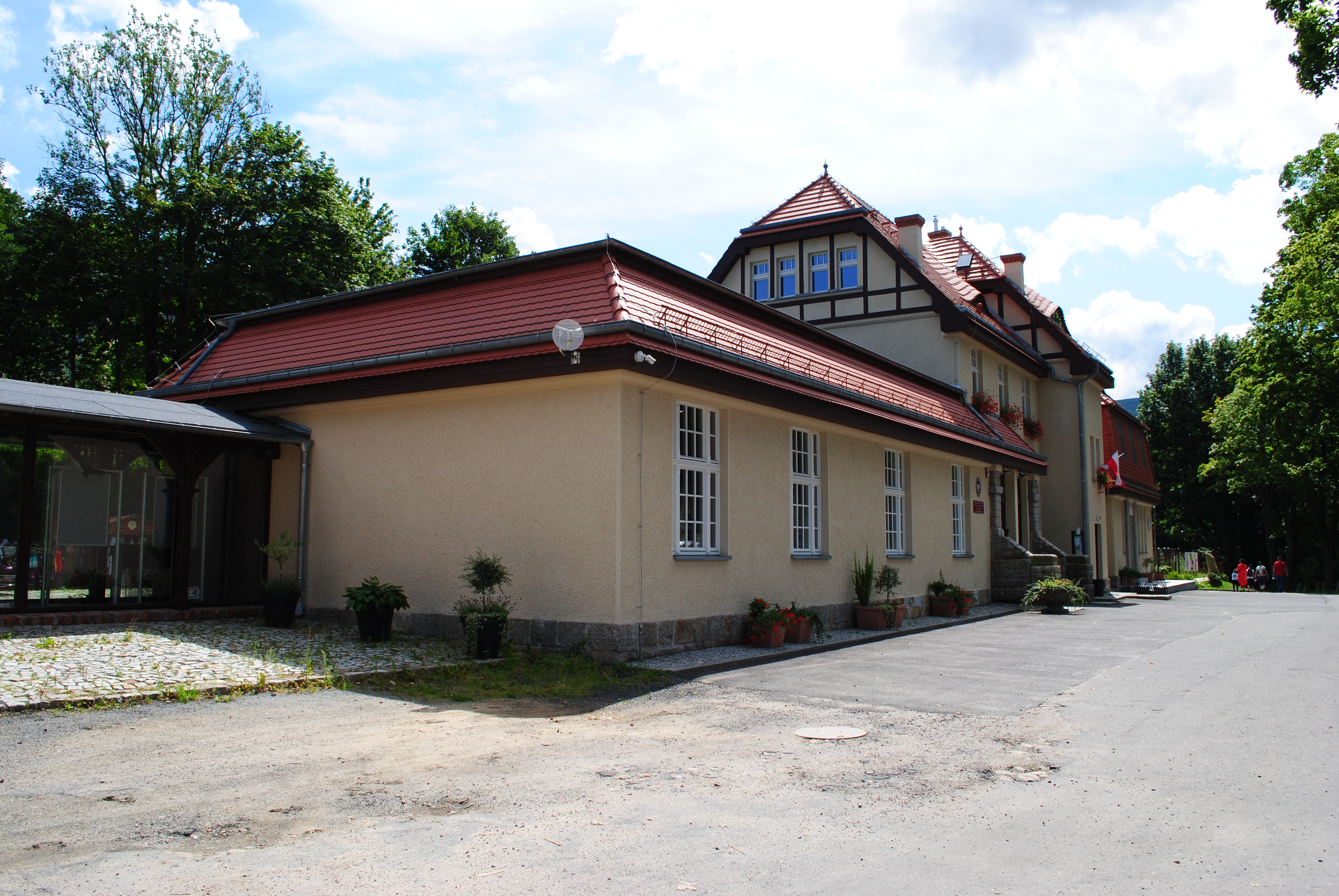
Station from the northwest

=== Remaining infrastructure ===
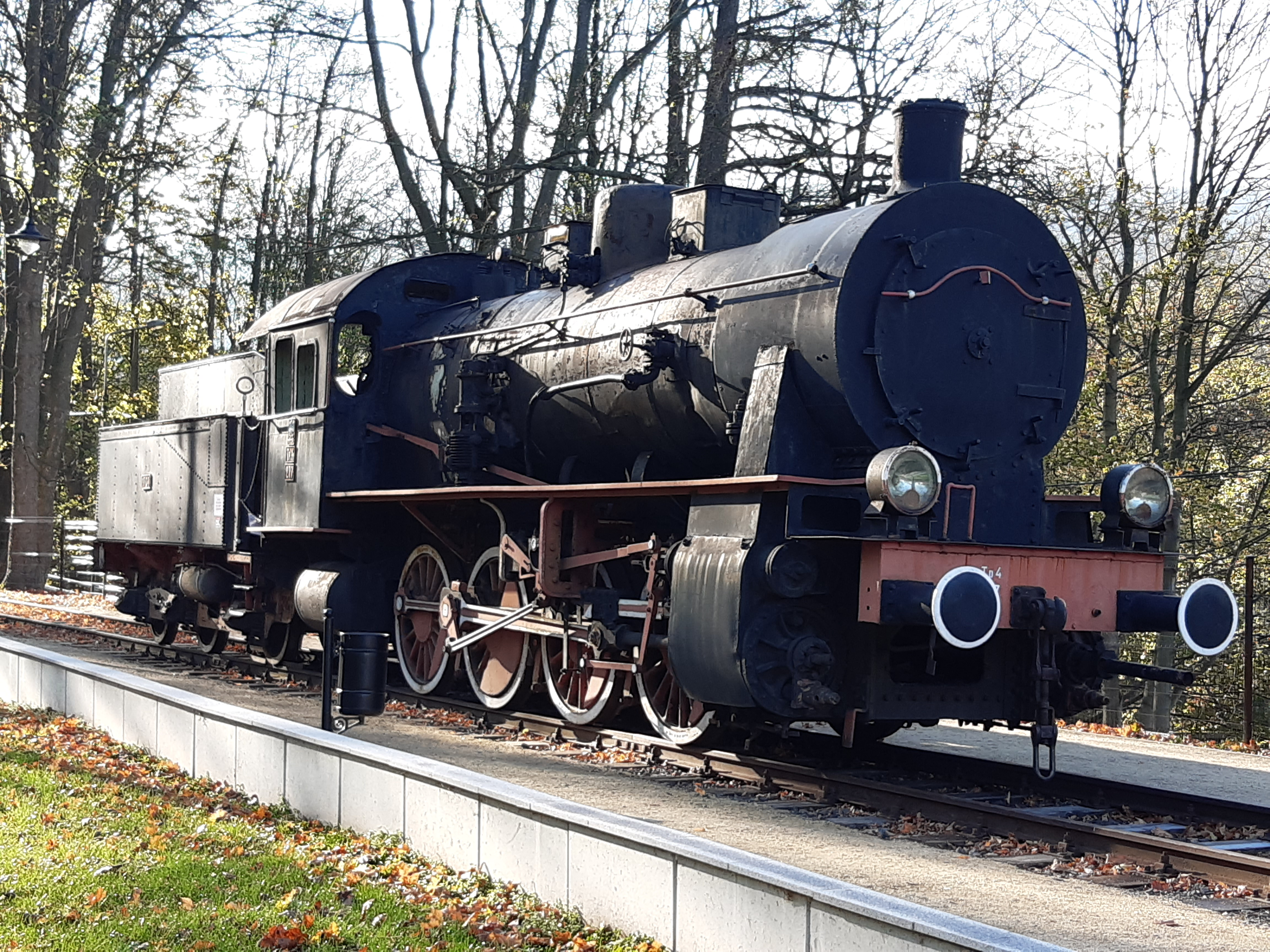
Monument locomotive Tp4 near the Świeradów-Zdrój station

The Świeradów-Zdrój station also housed or still houses the following structures: a warehouse with a side-head ramp, a freight yard, a toilet, and a utility building. Additionally, the former station had an emergency water supply for steam locomotives due to the presence of a well above the station and a water tower that allowed gravity-fed watering of locomotives.

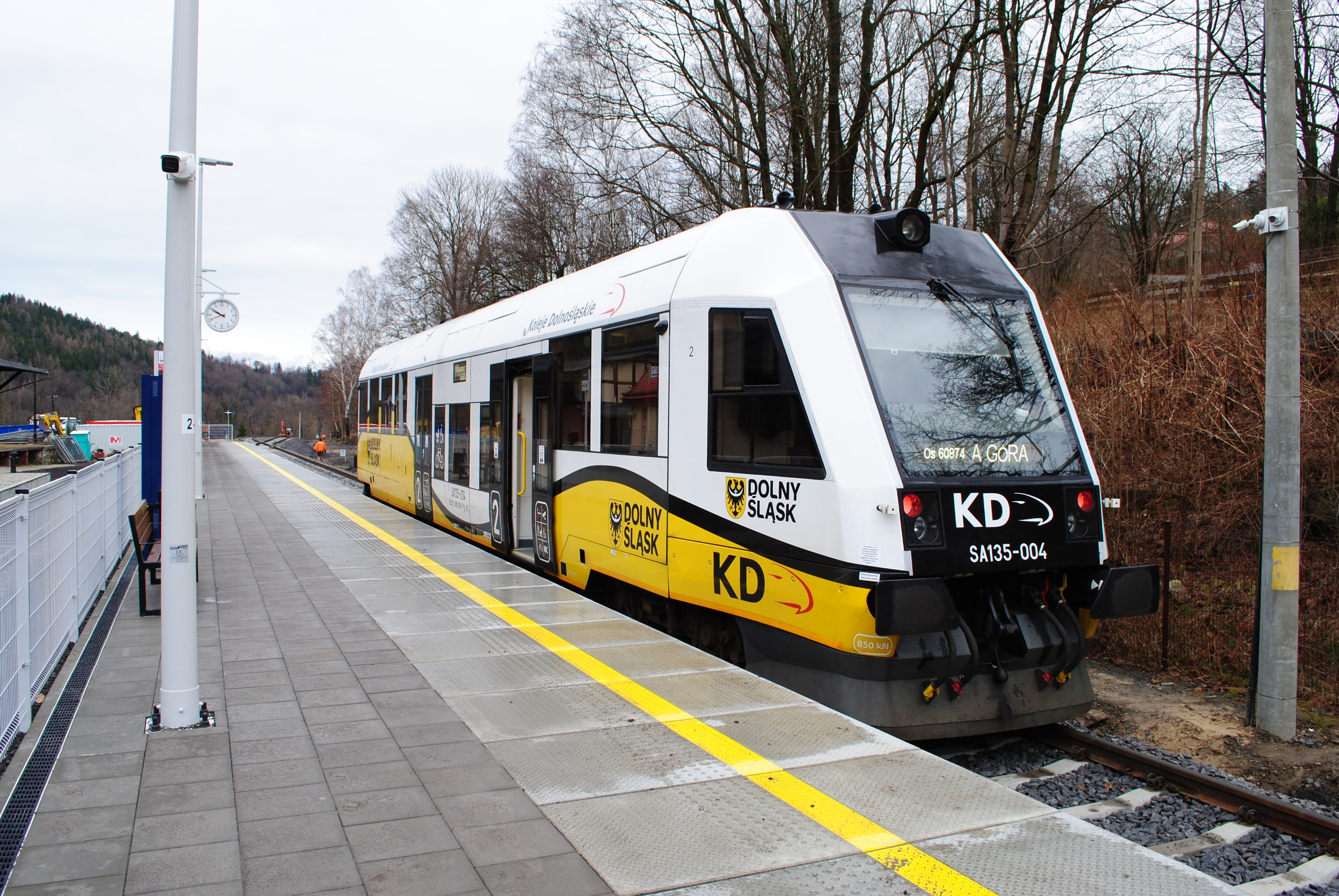
SA135-004 of Lower Silesian Railways as passenger train no. 60674 to Jelenia Góra at the station in February 2024

== Transport interchanges ==
Regular bus connections operate in front of the railway station. There is a bus stop, Dworcowa/PKP – (Stacja Kultury), served by the municipal public transport system on behalf of the Municipal Transport Company in Świeradów-Zdrój.

In the past, seasonal bus services were operated from 27 December 2013 to 7 September 2014 on behalf of the railway operator Polregio. These covered the route Jelenia Góra–Mirsk–Orłowice–Świeradów-Zdrój (three pairs of connections parallel to the railway line) as substitute bus transport. The services were provided by the carrier PKS TOUR Jelenia Góra.

== Train services ==
The station is served by the following services:

- Regional services (KD) Karpacz / Świeradów-Zdrój - Gryfów Śląski - Görlitz

== Bibliography ==
- Gołaszewski, Janusz (1997). "Kolejka Izerska 1909–1945" [Izerska Railway 1909–1945]. Rocznik Jeleniogórski (in Polish). Jelenia Góra: Towarzystwo Przyjaciół Jeleniej Góry.
