= Karpacz railway station =

Railway station in Poland

Karpacz
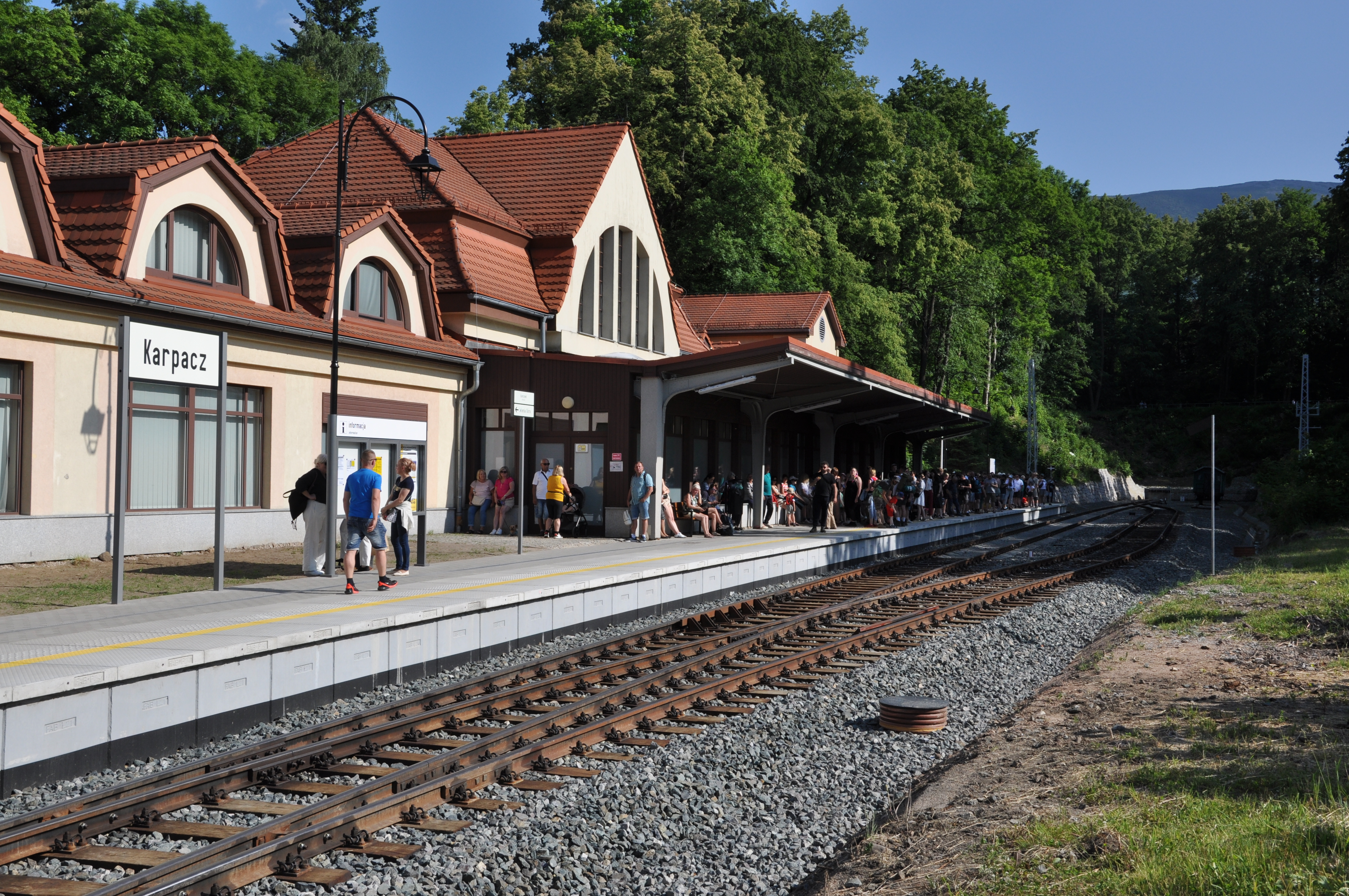
- Railway station in 2025

General information
- Location: Karpacz, Lower Silesian Voivodeship; Poland
- Coordinates: 50.7826°N 15.7617°E
- Owner: Lower Silesian Road and Railway Authority
- Line: Mysłakowice–Karpacz
- Platforms: 1
- Tracks: 1
- Train operators: Lower Silesian Railways

History
- Opened: 1895, 2025
- Closed: 2000
- Electrified: 1934
- Former names: Krummhübel (before 1945); Krzywa Góra (1945–1946)

Services
Preceding station	KD	Following station
Terminus	D62	Miłków towards Görlitz
Location
- Location within Poland Location within Lower Silesian Voivodeship

Karpacz is a railway station in Karpacz, in the Lower Silesian Voivodeship in Poland, it is the terminus of the Mysłakowice–Karpacz railway. Between 3 April 2000, and 13 June 2025, the station was closed for passenger services.

Since 2012, the station building has housed the Municipal Toy Museum and the city library.

== History ==
=== 1895–2000 ===
The railway to Karpacz was opened on 29 June 1895. The first train, decorated for the grand opening arrived at the termini the same day at 17:13. The opening of the railway led to an increase in tourist traffic between the 19th and 20th century. The location of the station on the outskirts of Karpacz was mainly due to the actions of restaurateur Fritz Exner, who opposed the construction of the station in the southern part of the town, as all establishments located below the station building would find themselves in a difficult financial situation.

In 1924, with the support of the local municipality, the construction of a new railway station began, adjoining the old building from the south. The construction of the new station was completed in 1925. The railway was electrified in 1934. After World War II, the area came under Polish administration. As a result, the station was taken over by Polish State Railways (PKP), and was renamed to Krzywa Góra, which was renamed to its modern name, Karpacz, in 1946. The remaining German staff, under the supervision of PKP, initially resumed the operation of electric trains, but by decision of an agreement between Poland and the Soviet Union, the overhead wire infrastructure was soon dismantled and subsequently transported to the USSR under war reperations.

After the railway line was taken over by the Polish State Railways, this section remained local until the end of its operation. On average, 3–6 pairs of trains ran per day. Occasionally, international trains from East Germany appeared on the line, and in the early 1990s, connections of the Lubusz Regional Railway from Czerwieńsk were also introduced.

=== Closure and reopening ===
On 3 April 2000, PKP suspended passenger services on 1,028.5 km (639.1 mi) of railway lines. In addition to insufficient profitability, PKP cited the deepening inefficiency of the model of limited subsidisation of railways solely from the central budget and the financing of passenger services by PKP from revenue from freight transport as reasons for the discontinuation of services. In response to the parliamentary inquiry of MP Andrzej Otręba on 21 March 2000, the PKP Passenger Transport Directorate indicated that the operational costs of the Jelenia Góra – Mysłakowice and Mysłakowice – Karpacz railway services were covered at a level of 18 percent. It was noted at that time that services with cost coverage from revenue below 20%, in the absence of other sources of funding than revenue, were intended for discontinuation.

The last scheduled passenger train from Karpacz departed on 2 April 2000, and was hauled by SP42-001 locomotive. In the subsequent period, special train rides still took place, as the line wasn't dismantled. The complete suspension of railway traffic along the entire route occurred by 23 November 2000.

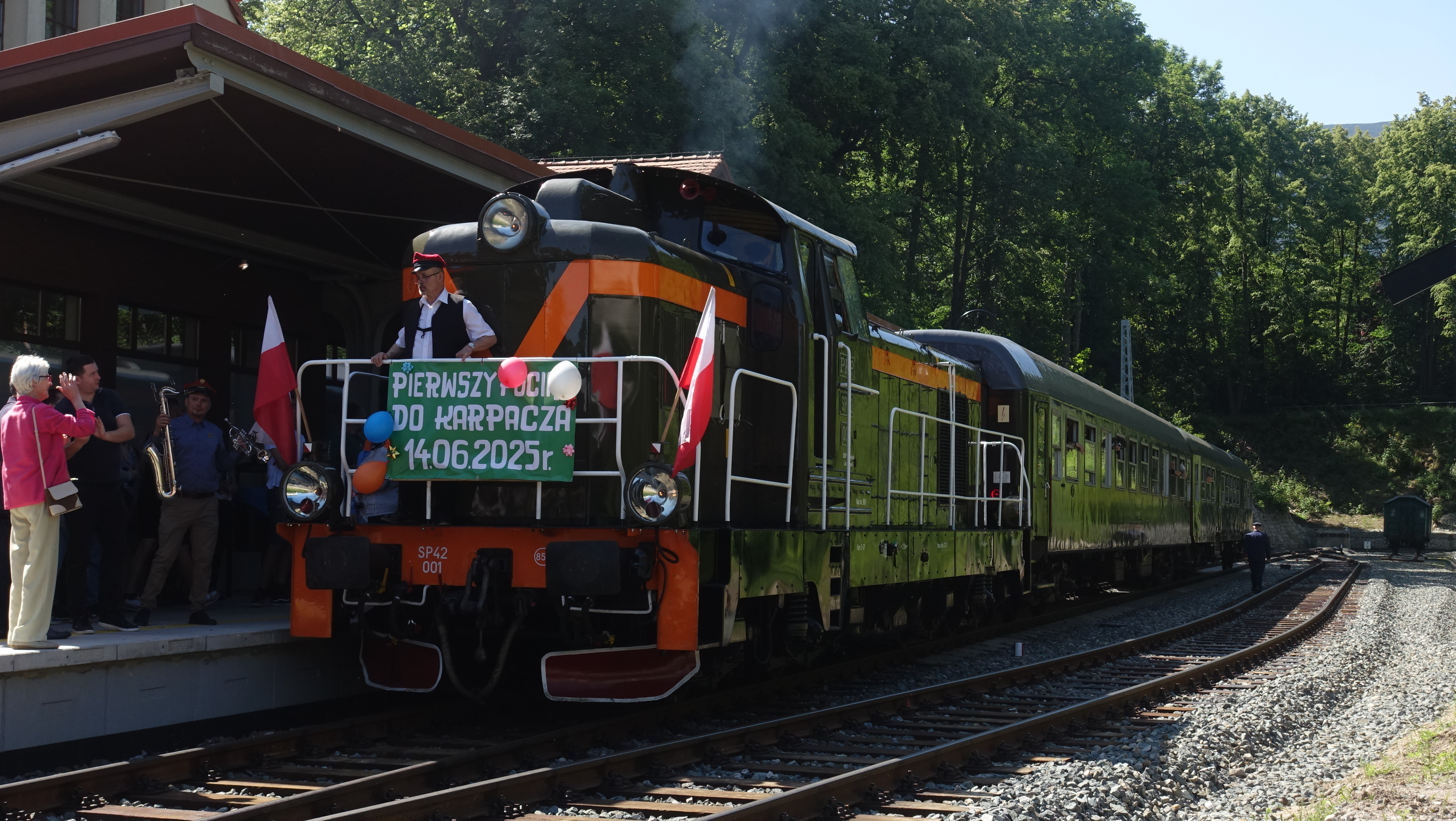
SP42-001 with the first special train with passengers at the railway station after reopening the railway line from Jelenia Góra

In 2008, the station building was taken over by the city of Karpacz, which began renovating the historic structure. Since June 2012, the building has housed the Municipal Toy Museum and the city library. Seasonal tourist draisine traffic was also conducted within the station area.

In 2021, the Lower Silesian Voivodeship took over the Mysłakowice–Karpacz and Kamienna Góra–Mysłakowice–Jelenia Góra railway lines from PKP Polskie Linie Kolejowe to restore passenger train service to Karpacz and Kowary. On 15 December 2022, a tender was announced for the renovation of the section from Jelenia Góra to Mysłakowice, and in 2023 work began on the revitalization of the segment to Karpacz.

On 14 June 2025, the first special train with passengers arrived in Karpacz, hauled by a PKP Class SP42. Its unit number, 001 – was the same locomotive that 25 years earlier had led the last passenger train on the line. Regular train services was restored the following day, on 15 June 2025, operated by Lower Silesian Railways.

== Train services ==
The station is served by the following services:

- Regional services (KD) Karpacz / Świeradów-Zdrój - Gryfów Śląski - Görlitz
