= Miedziane =

Miedziane may refer to the following places in Poland:

- Miedziane, Lower Silesian Voivodeship in Gmina Sulików, Zgorzelec County in Lower Silesian Voivodeship (SW Poland)
- Miedziane, a peak in the Polish High Tatras
