= Bierna =

Bierna may refer to the following places in Poland:

- Bierna, Lower Silesian Voivodeship (south-west Poland)
- Bierna, Silesian Voivodeship (south Poland)
