= Gmina Sulików =

Gmina Sulików Sulików Commune
- Gmina
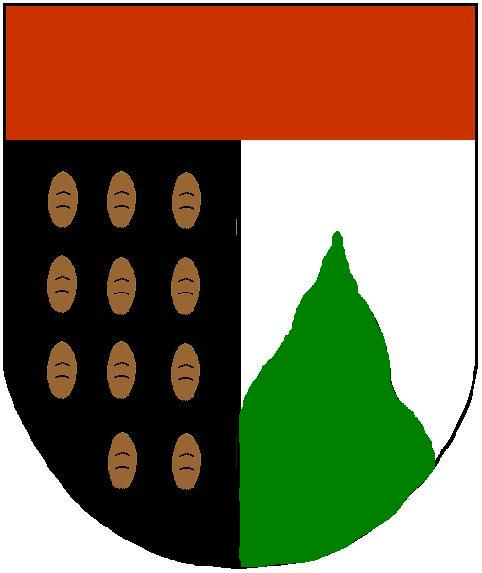
- Coat of arms

- Location within Lower Silesian Voivodeship Location within Poland
- Coordinates (Sulików): 51°4′33″N 15°4′1″E
- Country: Poland
- Voivodeship: Lower Silesian
- County: Zgorzelec
- Seat: Sulików

Area
  - Total: 95.22 km^{2} (36.76 sq mi)

Population (2019-06-30)
  - Total: 6,052
  - Density: 63.56/km^{2} (164.6/sq mi)
- Website: http://www.sulikow.pl

Gmina Sulików is a rural gmina (administrative district) in Zgorzelec County, Lower Silesian Voivodeship, in south-western Poland, on the Czech border. Its seat is the village of Sulików, which lies approximately 10 kilometres (6 mi) south-east of Zgorzelec, and 138 kilometres (86 mi) west of the regional capital Wrocław.

The gmina covers an area of 95.22 square kilometres (36.8 sq mi), and as of 2019 its total population is 6,052.

== Neighbouring gminas ==
Gmina Sulików is bordered by the town of Zawidów and the gminas of Lubań, Platerówka, Siekierczyn and Zgorzelec. It also borders the Czech Republic.

== Villages ==
The gmina contains the villages of Bierna, Jabłoniec, Ksawerów, Łowin, Mała Wieś Dolna, Mała Wieś Górna, Miedziana, Mikułowa, Nowoszyce, Podgórze, Radzimów, Skrzydlice, Stary Zawidów, Studniska Dolne, Studniska Górne, Sulików, Wielichów, Wilka, Wilka-Bory, Wrociszów Dolny and Wrociszów Górny.
