= Łowin, Lower Silesian Voivodeship =

Łowin
- Village
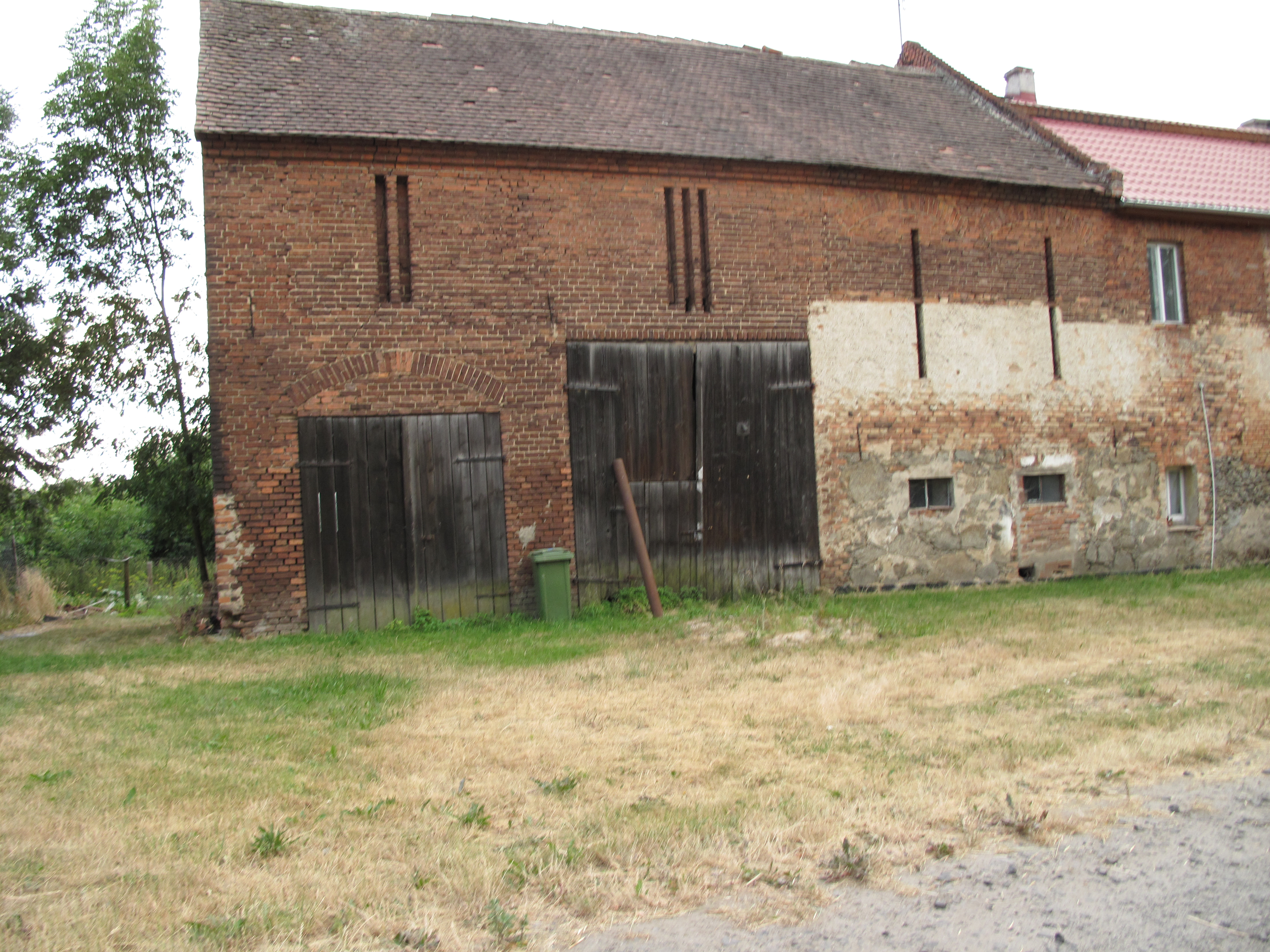
- Barn

- Location within Poland
- Coordinates: 51°00′35″N 15°06′51″E
- Country: Poland
- Voivodeship: Lower Silesian
- County: Zgorzelec
- Gmina: Sulików

Łowin [ˈwɔvin] is a village in the administrative district of Gmina Sulików, within Zgorzelec County, Lower Silesian Voivodeship, in south-western Poland, close to the Czech border.

== Gallery ==
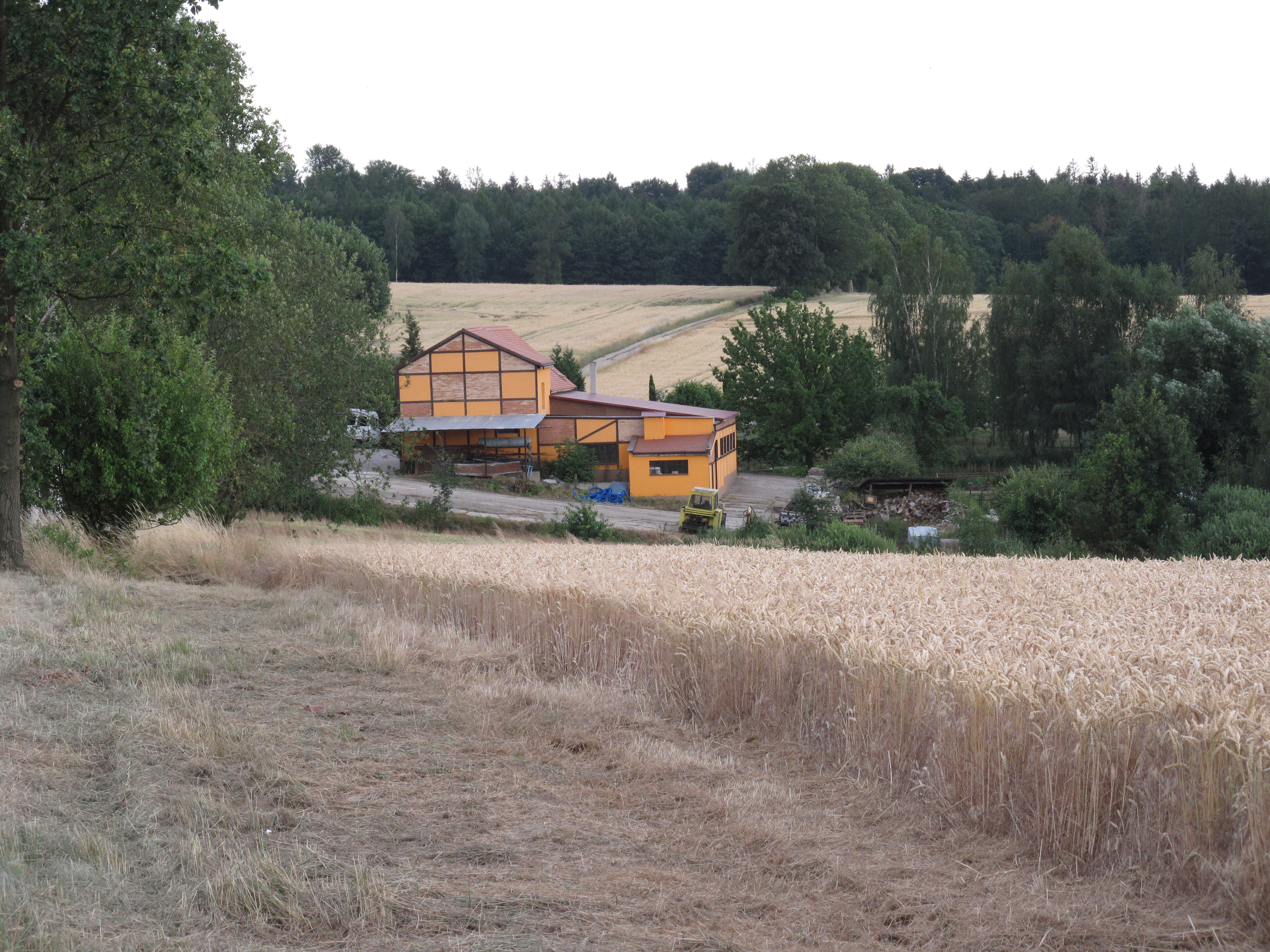
Facility

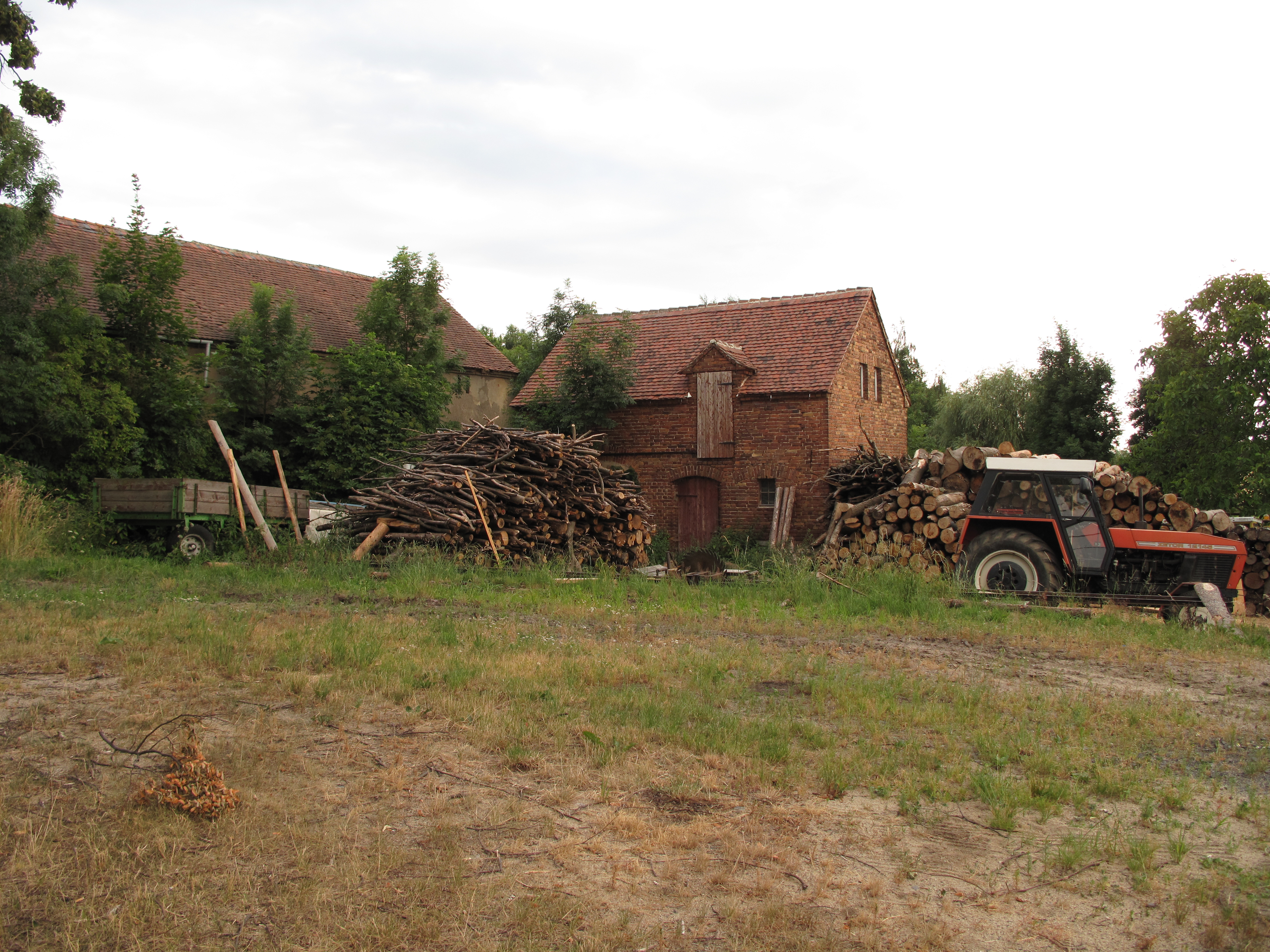
Barn

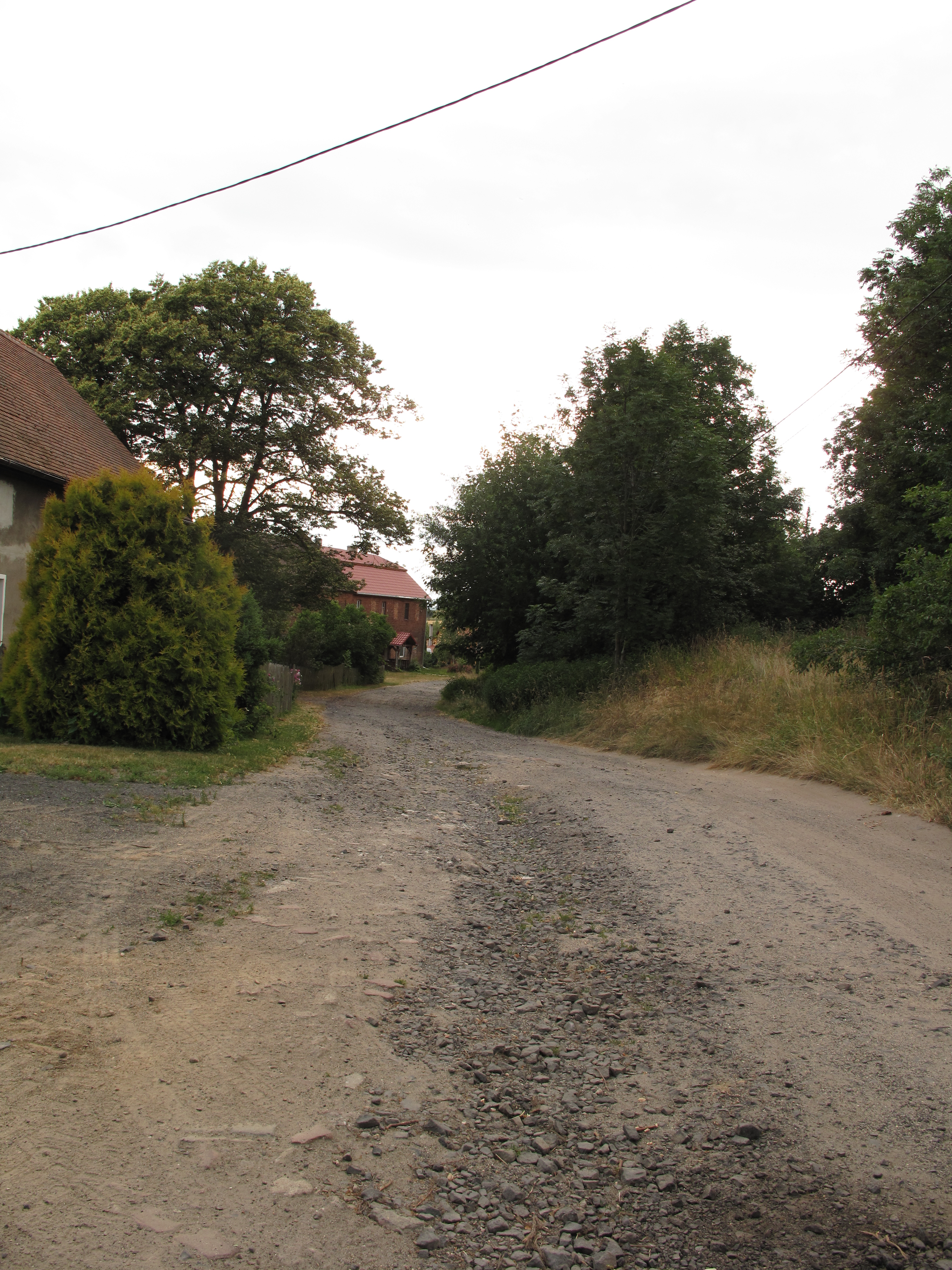
Road in the village
