= Wrociszów Dolny =

- Village
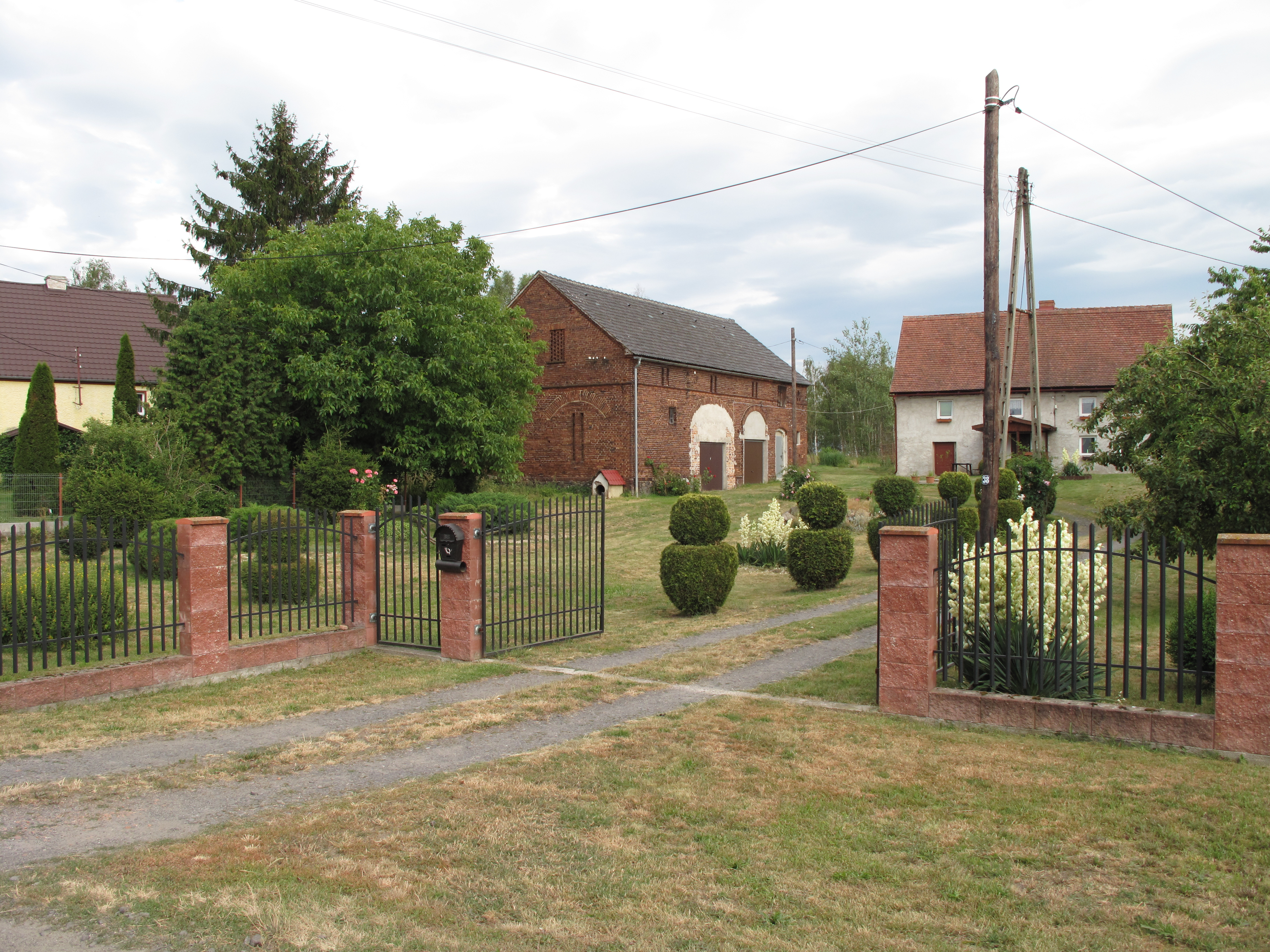

- Location within Poland
- Coordinates: 51°02′49″N 15°01′48″E
- Country: Poland
- Voivodeship: Lower Silesian
- County: Zgorzelec
- Gmina: Sulików
- Postal code: 59-970

Wrociszów Dolny [vrɔˈt͡ɕiʂuf ˈdɔlnɨ] (Upper Sorbian: Delni Breszów) is a village in the administrative district of Gmina Sulików, within Zgorzelec County, Lower Silesian Voivodeship, in south-western Poland, close to the Czech border.
