= Radzimów =

- Village
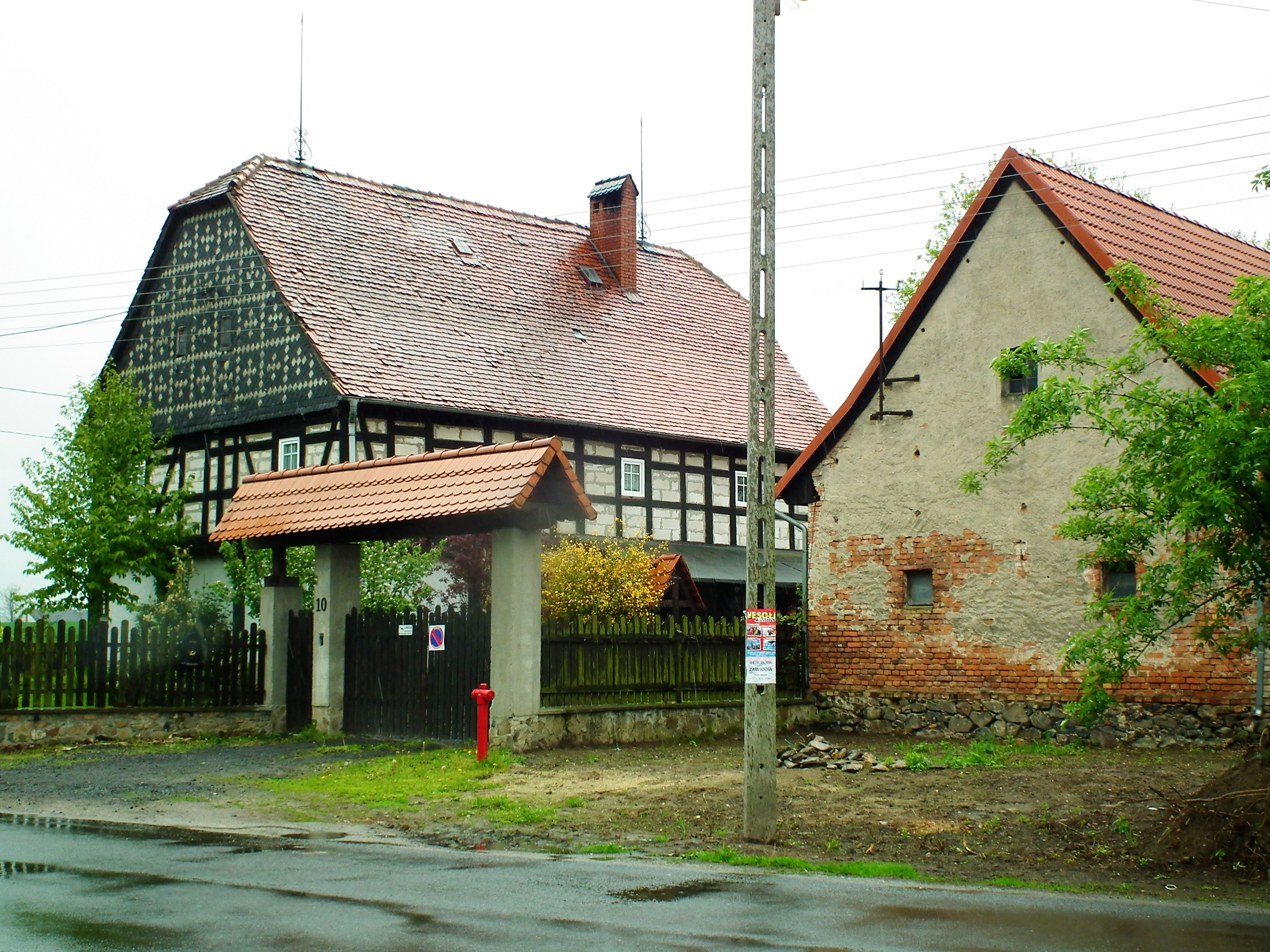

- Location within Poland
- Coordinates: 51°3′N 15°7′E
- Country: Poland
- Voivodeship: Lower Silesian
- County: Zgorzelec
- Gmina: Sulików
- Population: 784

Radzimów [raˈd͡ʑimuf] is a village in the administrative district of Gmina Sulików, within Zgorzelec County, Lower Silesian Voivodeship, in southwestern Poland, close to the Czech border.

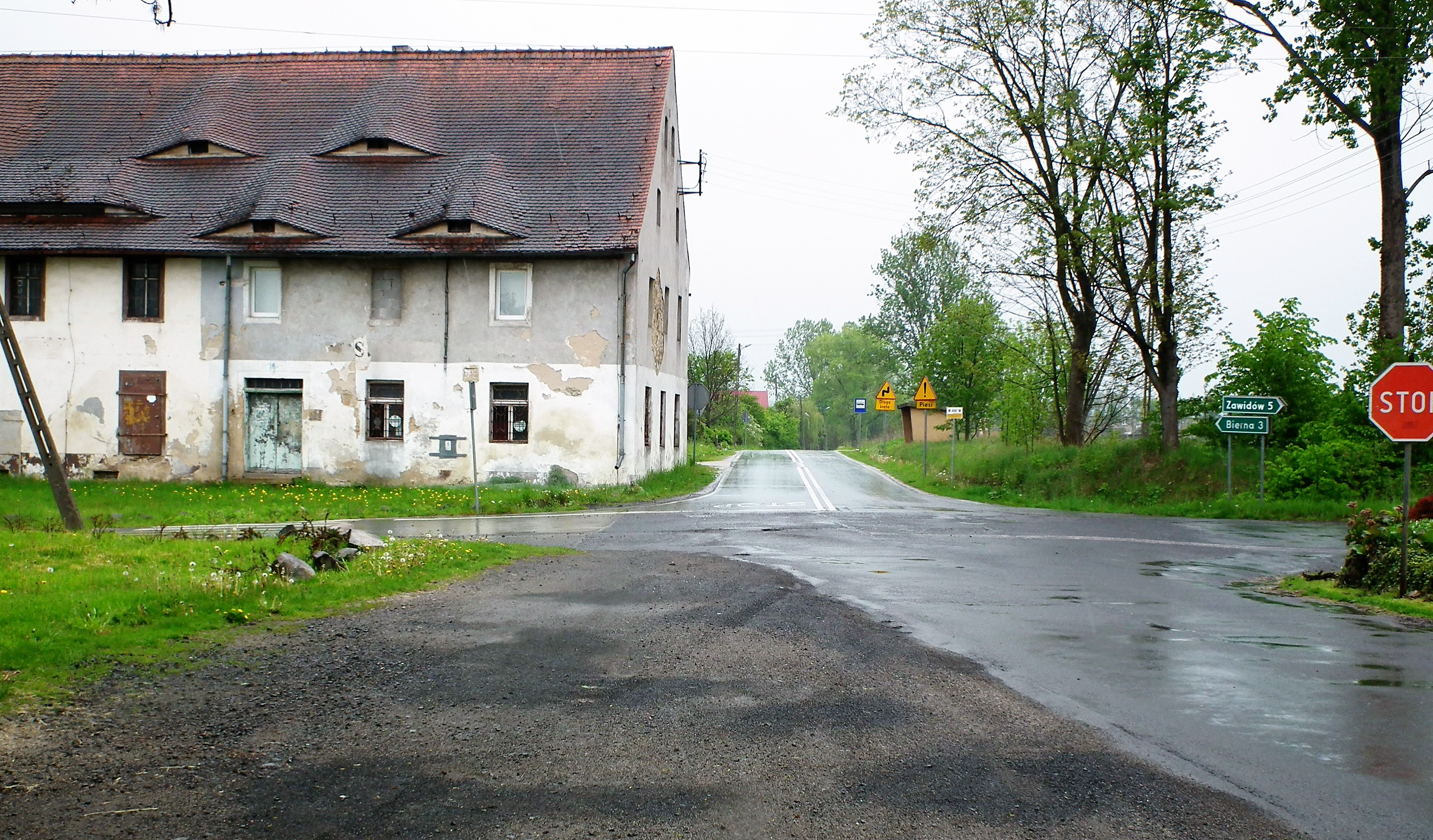
Crossroads

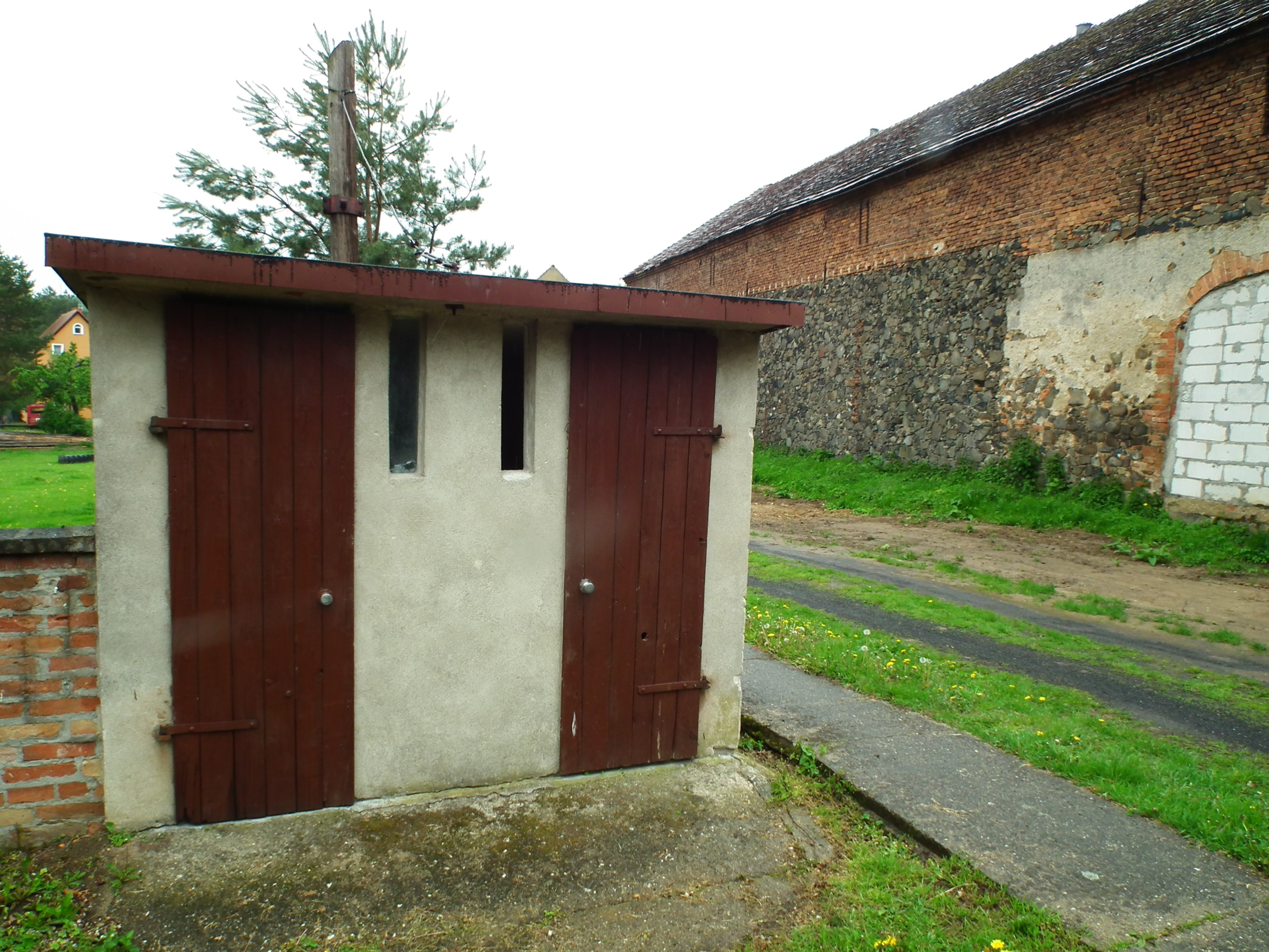
Toilet

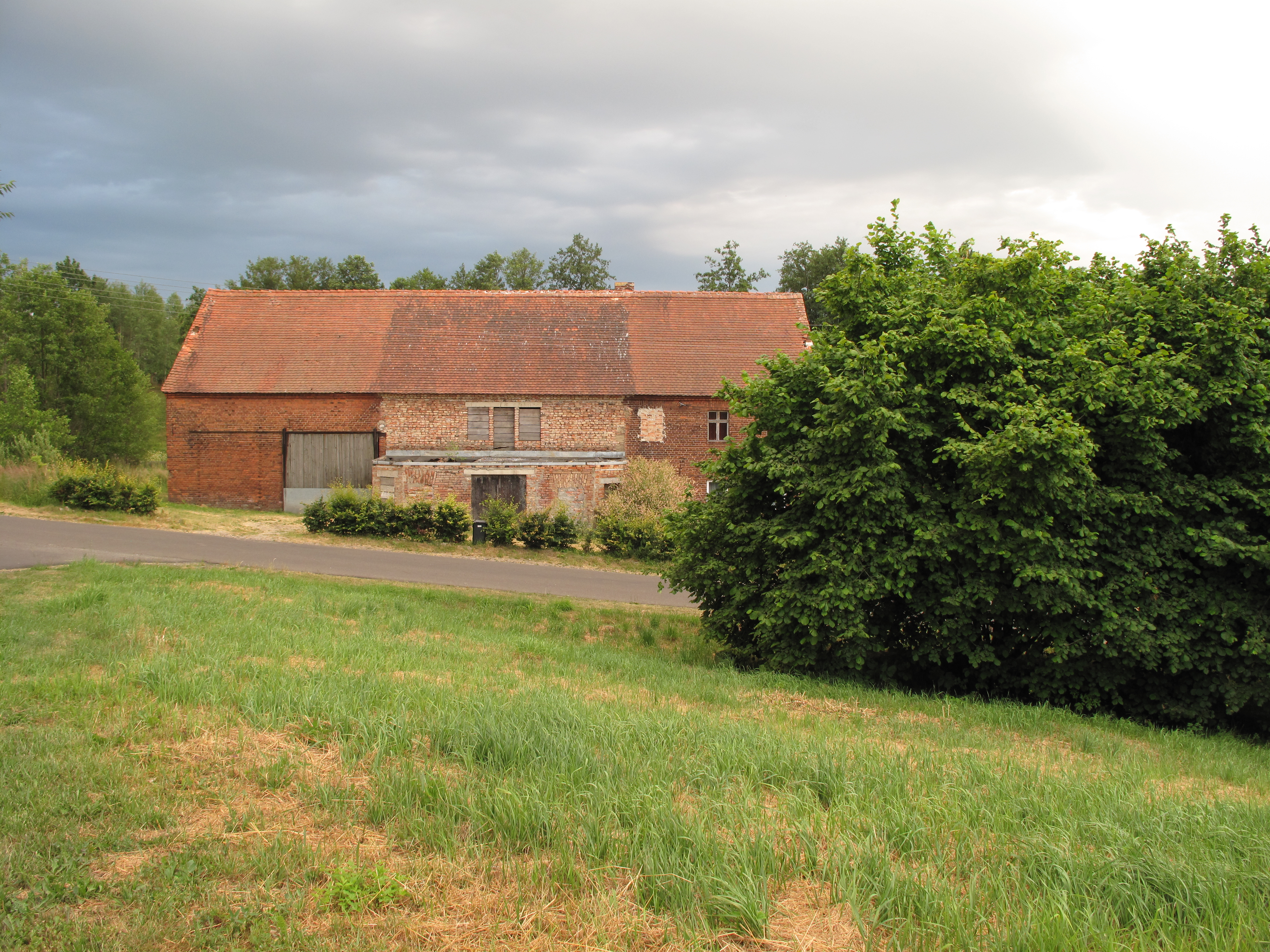
House

== Notable residents ==
- Moritz von Bissing (1844–1917), Prussian general
