= Mała Wieś Górna =

- Village
- Location within Poland
- Coordinates: 51°04′18″N 15°05′37″E
- Country: Poland
- Voivodeship: Lower Silesian
- County: Zgorzelec
- Gmina: Sulików

Mała Wieś Górna [ˈmawa ˈvjɛɕ ˈɡurna] (Upper Sorbian: Mała Wjes Górna) is a village in the administrative district of Gmina Sulików, within Zgorzelec County, Lower Silesian Voivodeship, in south-western Poland, close to the Czech border.
