= Ksawerów, Lower Silesian Voivodeship =

Ksawerów
- Village
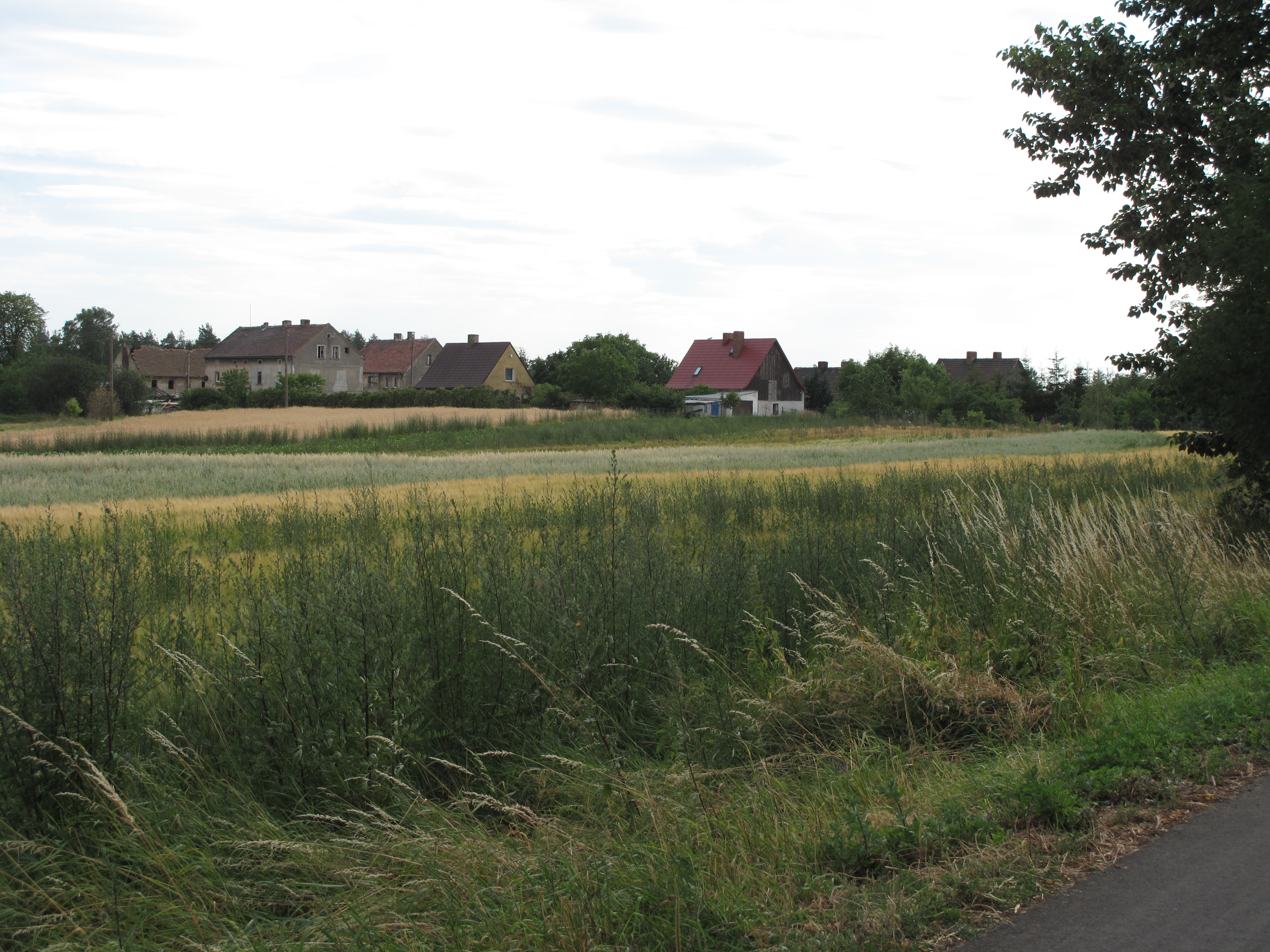
- Ksawerów from the distance

- Location within Poland
- Coordinates: 51°02′16″N 15°02′10″E
- Country: Poland
- Voivodeship: Lower Silesian
- County: Zgorzelec
- Gmina: Sulików

Ksawerów [ksaˈvɛruf] is a village in the administrative district of Gmina Sulików, within Zgorzelec County, Lower Silesian Voivodeship, in south-western Poland, close to the Czech border.

== Gallery ==
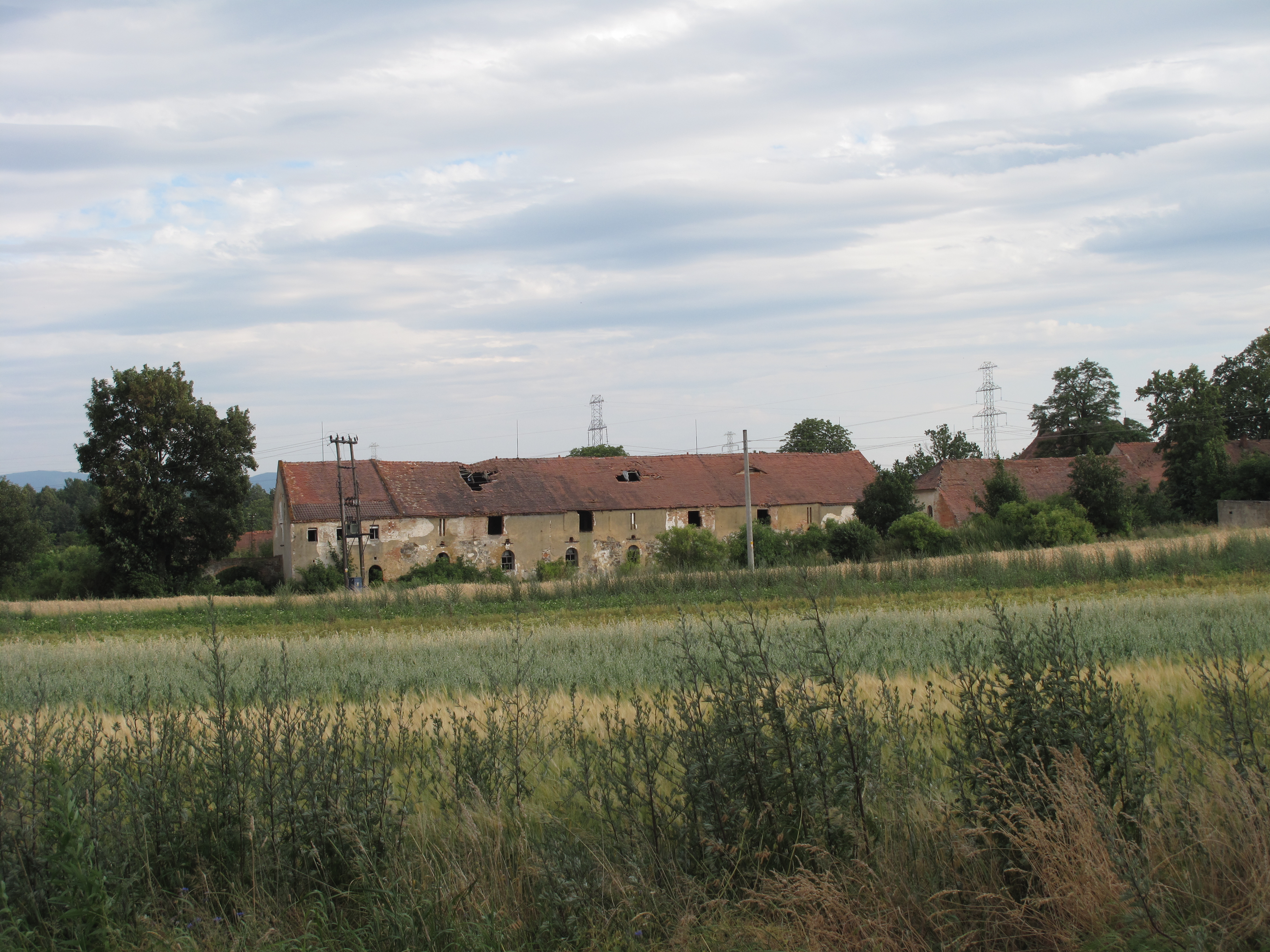
Old farm

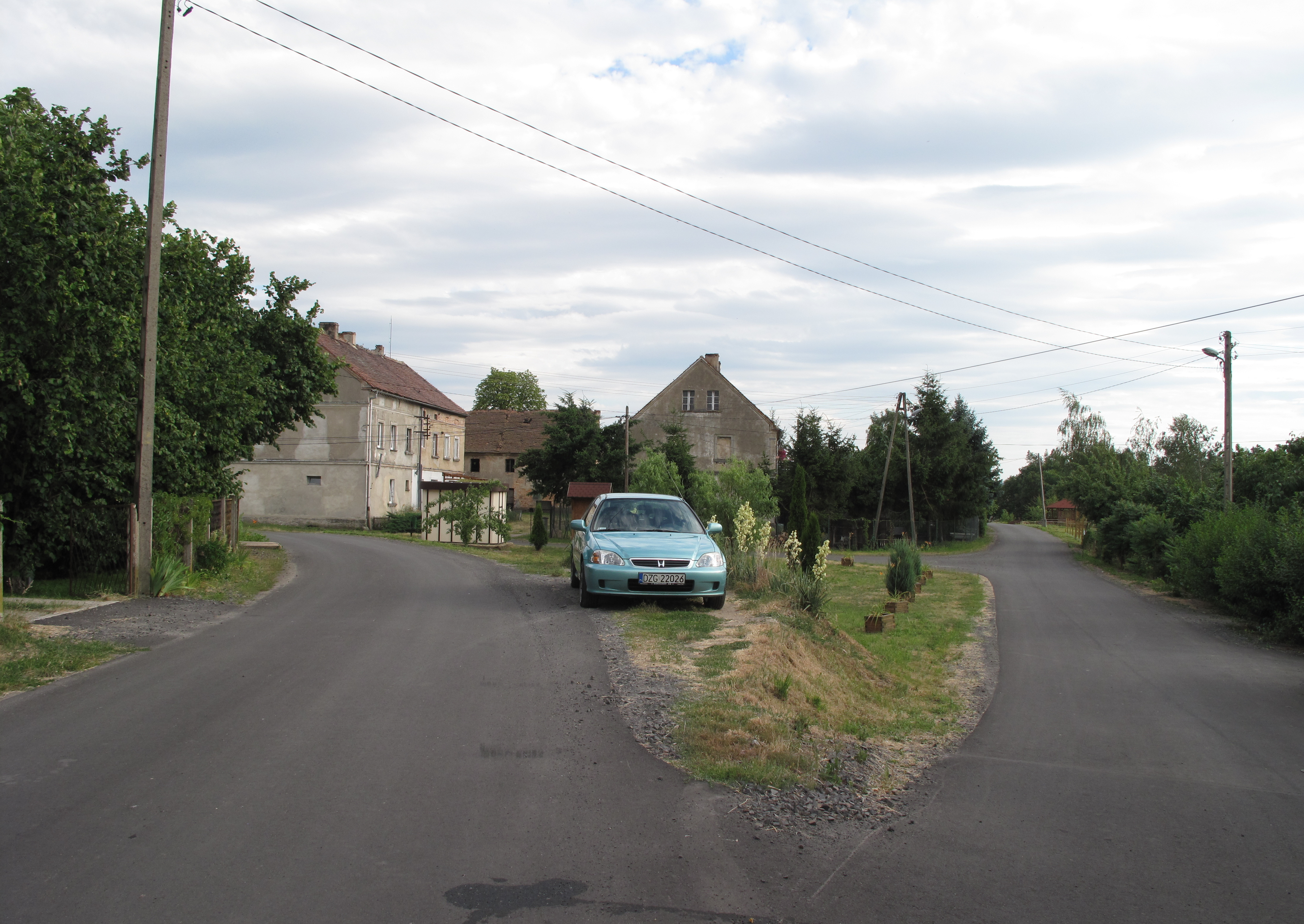
Village square

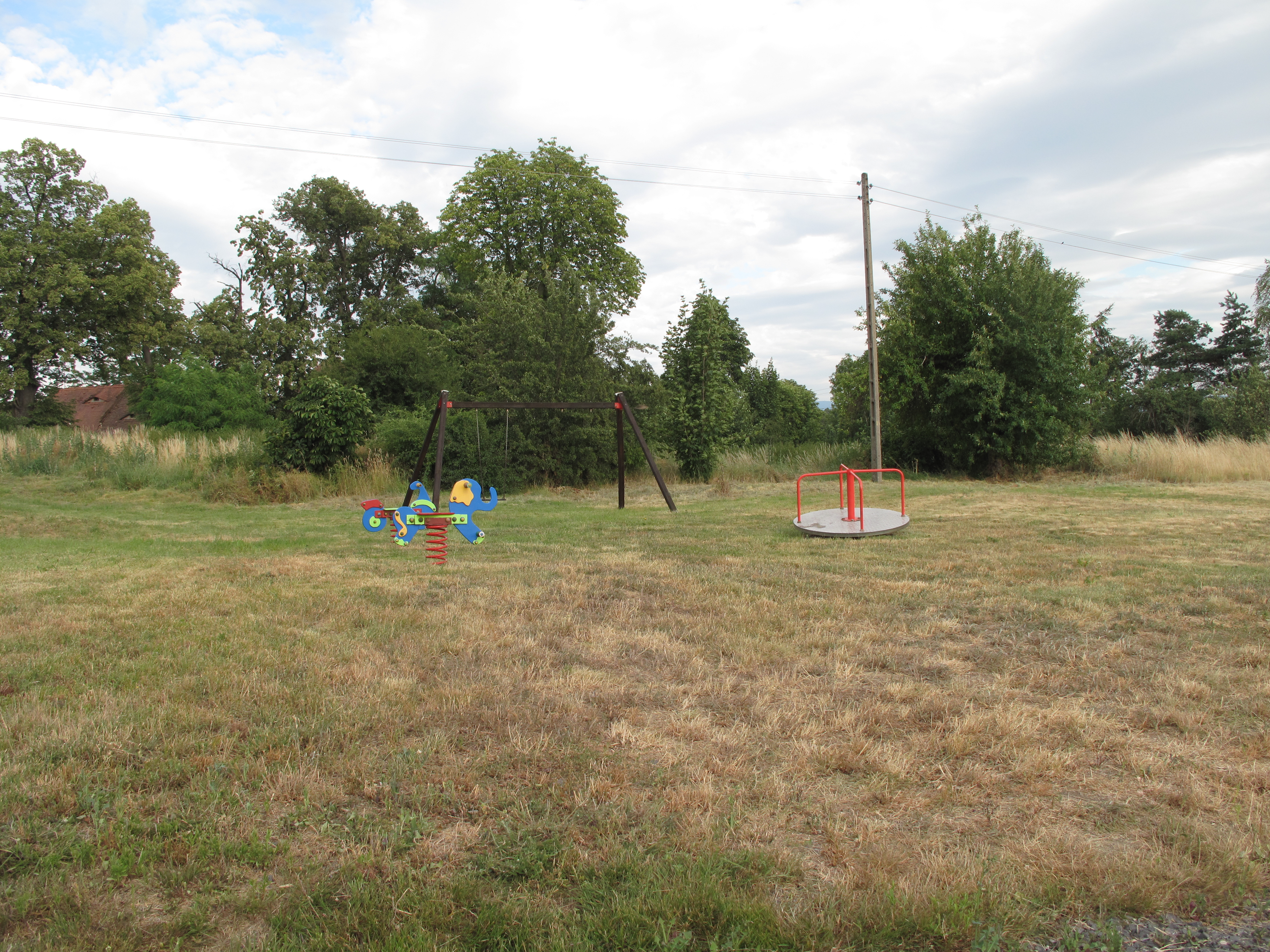
Children's playground
