= Jabłoniec, Lower Silesian Voivodeship =

Jabłoniec
- Village
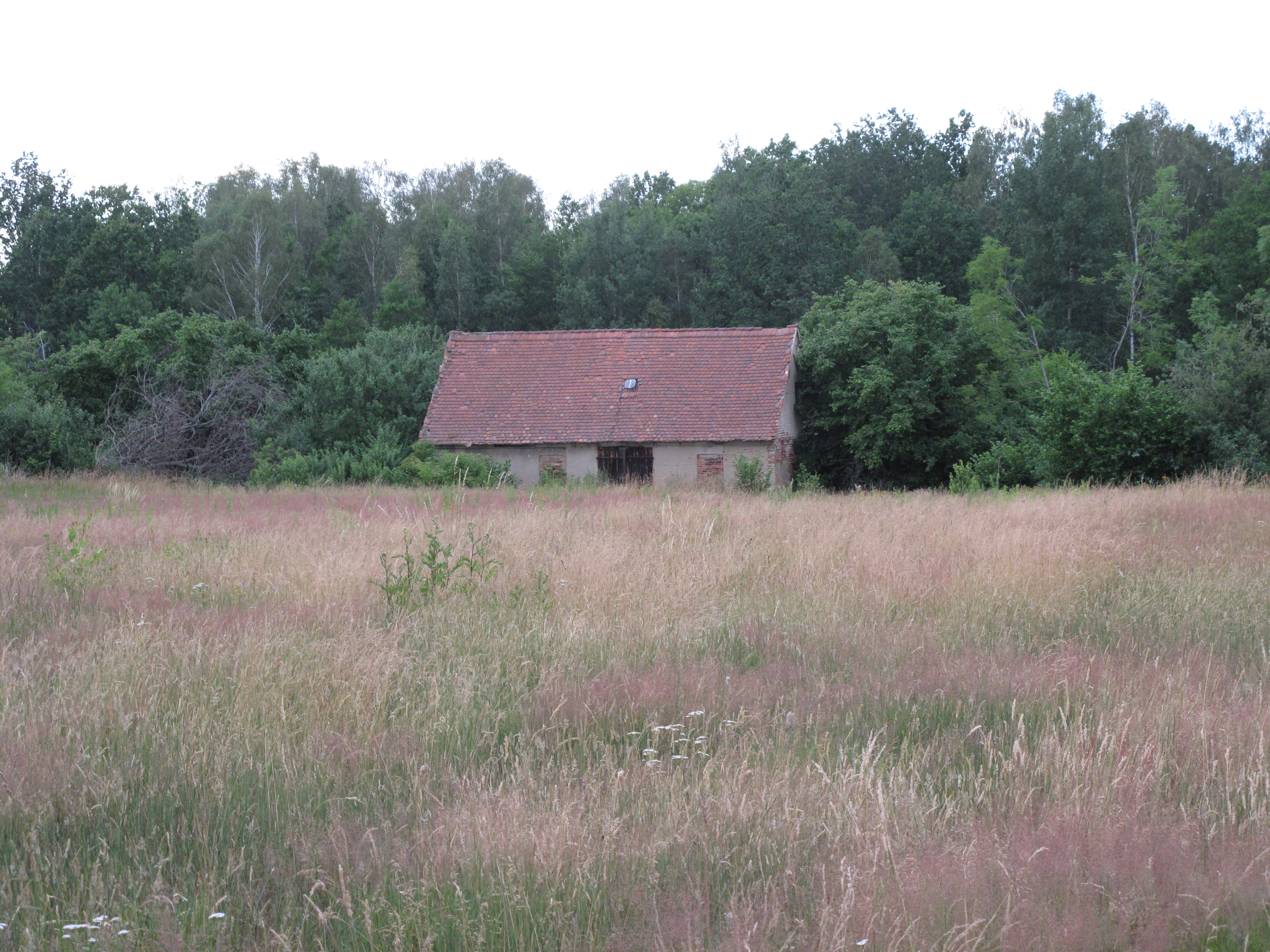
- Barn

- Location within Poland
- Coordinates: 51°01′11″N 15°08′26″E
- Country: Poland
- Voivodeship: Lower Silesian
- County: Zgorzelec
- Gmina: Sulików

Jabłoniec [jaˈbwɔɲɛt͡s] (Upper Sorbian: Jabłučina) is a village in the administrative district of Gmina Sulików, within Zgorzelec County, Lower Silesian Voivodeship, in south-western Poland, close to the Czech border.

== Gallery ==
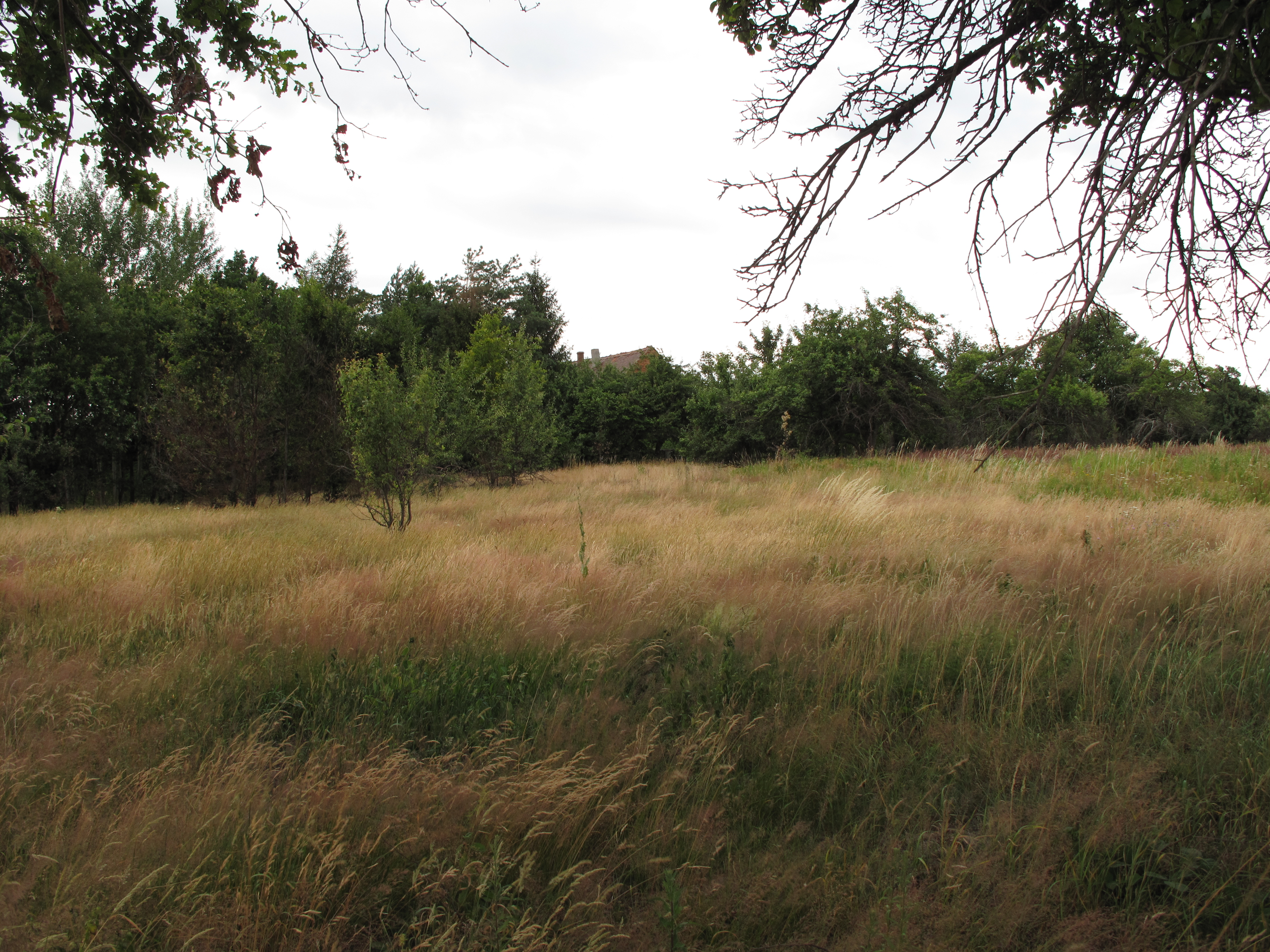
Gardens

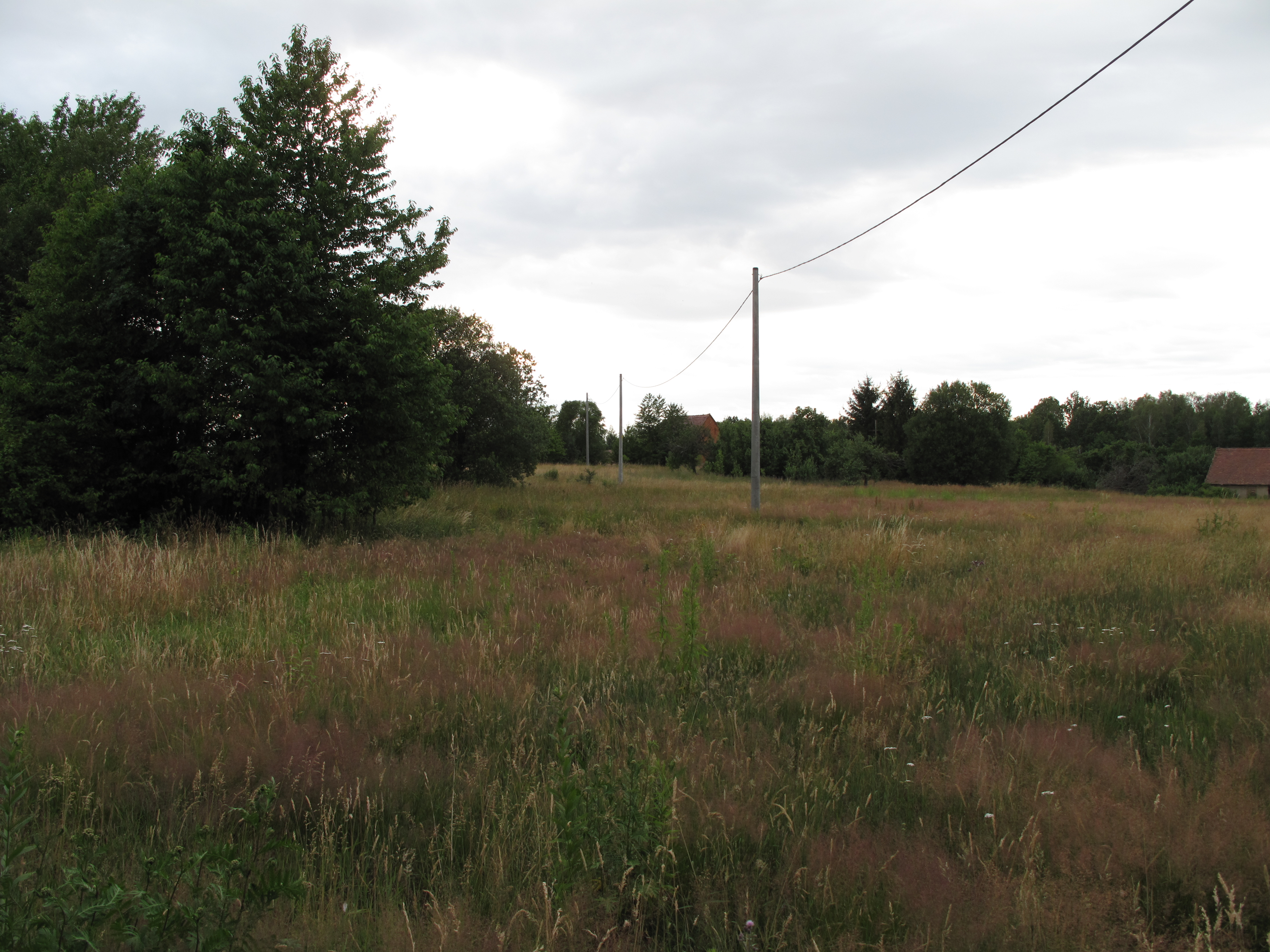
Powerline with houses at the distance
