= Studniska Górne =

- Village
- Location within Poland
- Coordinates: 51°06′48″N 15°05′53″E
- Country: Poland
- Voivodeship: Lower Silesian
- County: Zgorzelec
- Gmina: Sulików

Studniska Górne [studˈniska ˈɡurnɛ] (Upper Sorbian: Horni Studniska) is a village in the administrative district of Gmina Sulików, within Zgorzelec County, Lower Silesian Voivodeship, in south-western Poland, close to the Czech border.
