= Wrociszów Górny =

- Village
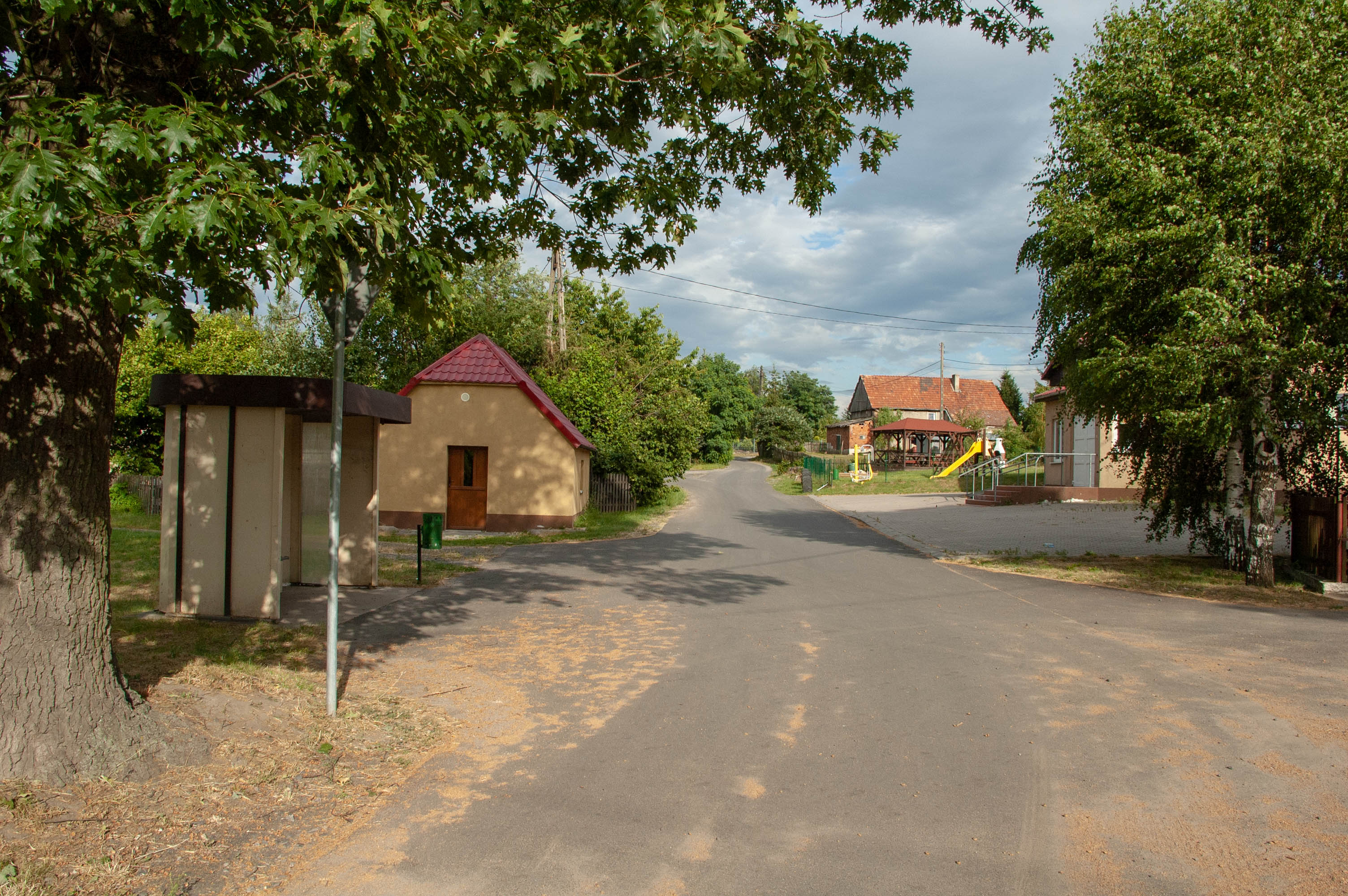

- Location within Poland
- Coordinates: 51°02′47″N 15°03′29″E
- Country: Poland
- Voivodeship: Lower Silesian
- County: Zgorzelec
- Gmina: Sulików

Wrociszów Górny [vrɔˈt͡ɕiʂuf ˈɡurnɨ] (Upper Sorbian: Horni Breszów) is a village in the administrative district of Gmina Sulików, within Zgorzelec County, Lower Silesian Voivodeship, in south-western Poland, close to the Czech border.

== Gallery ==
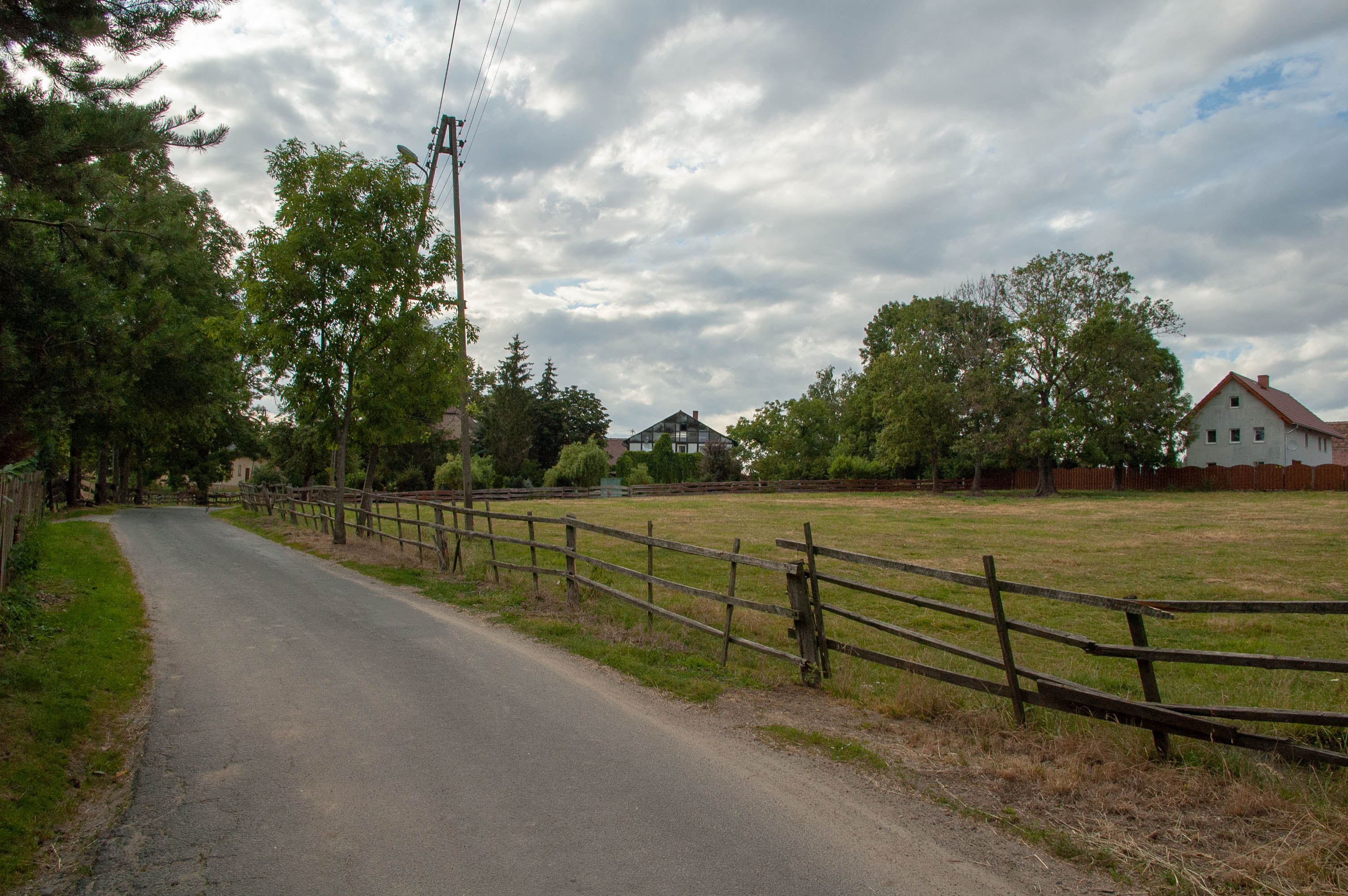
Pasture

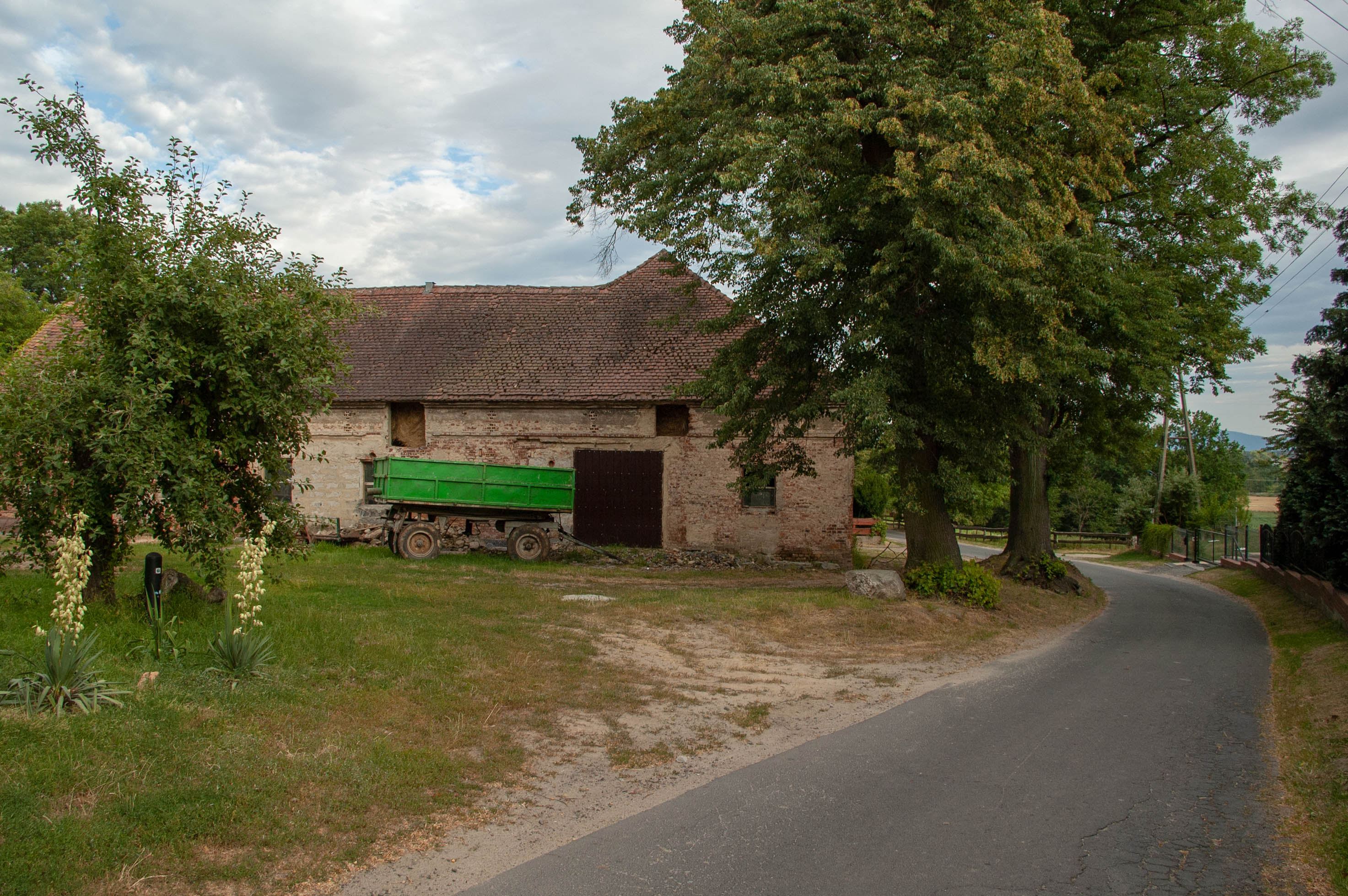
Barn

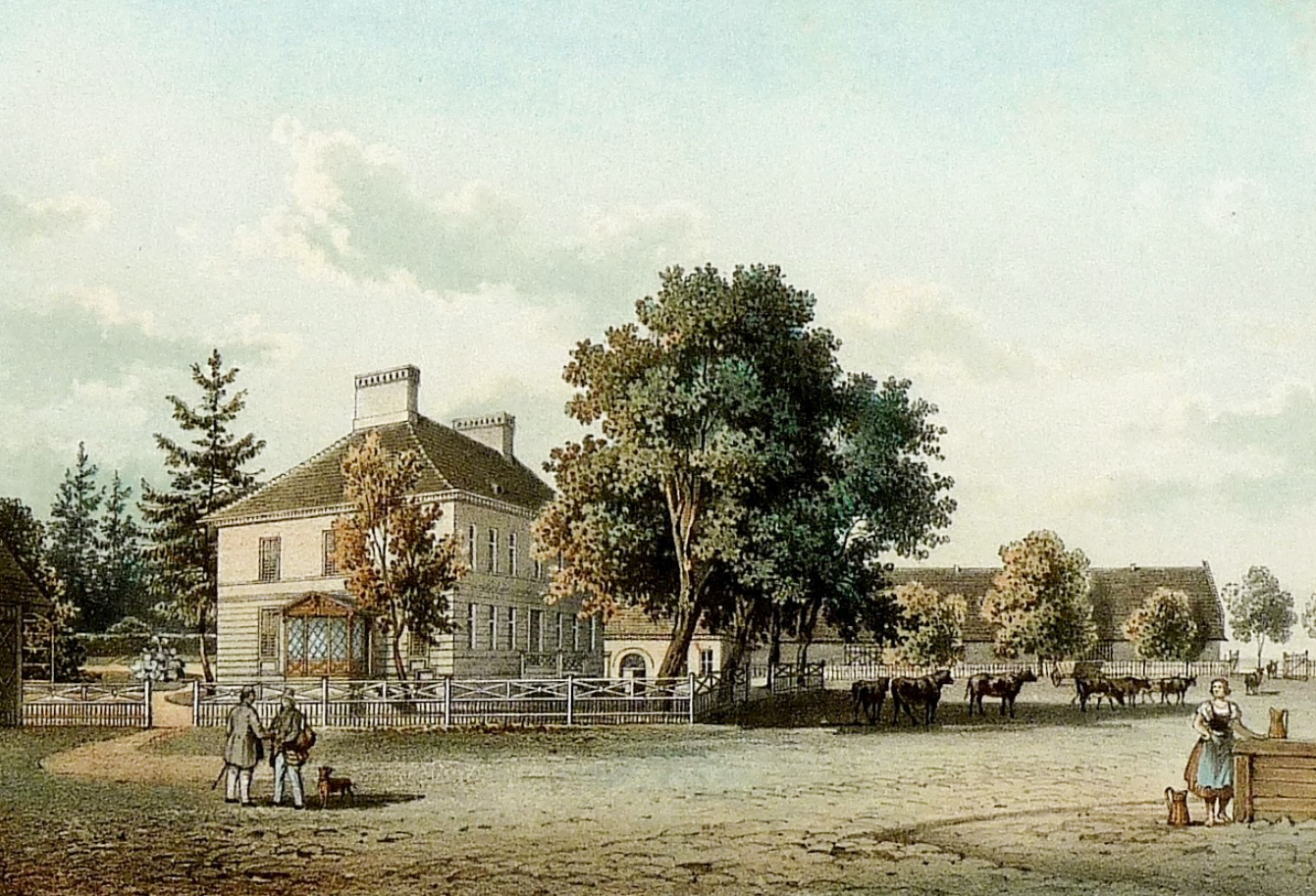
19th century in the village
