= Mała Wieś Dolna =

- Village
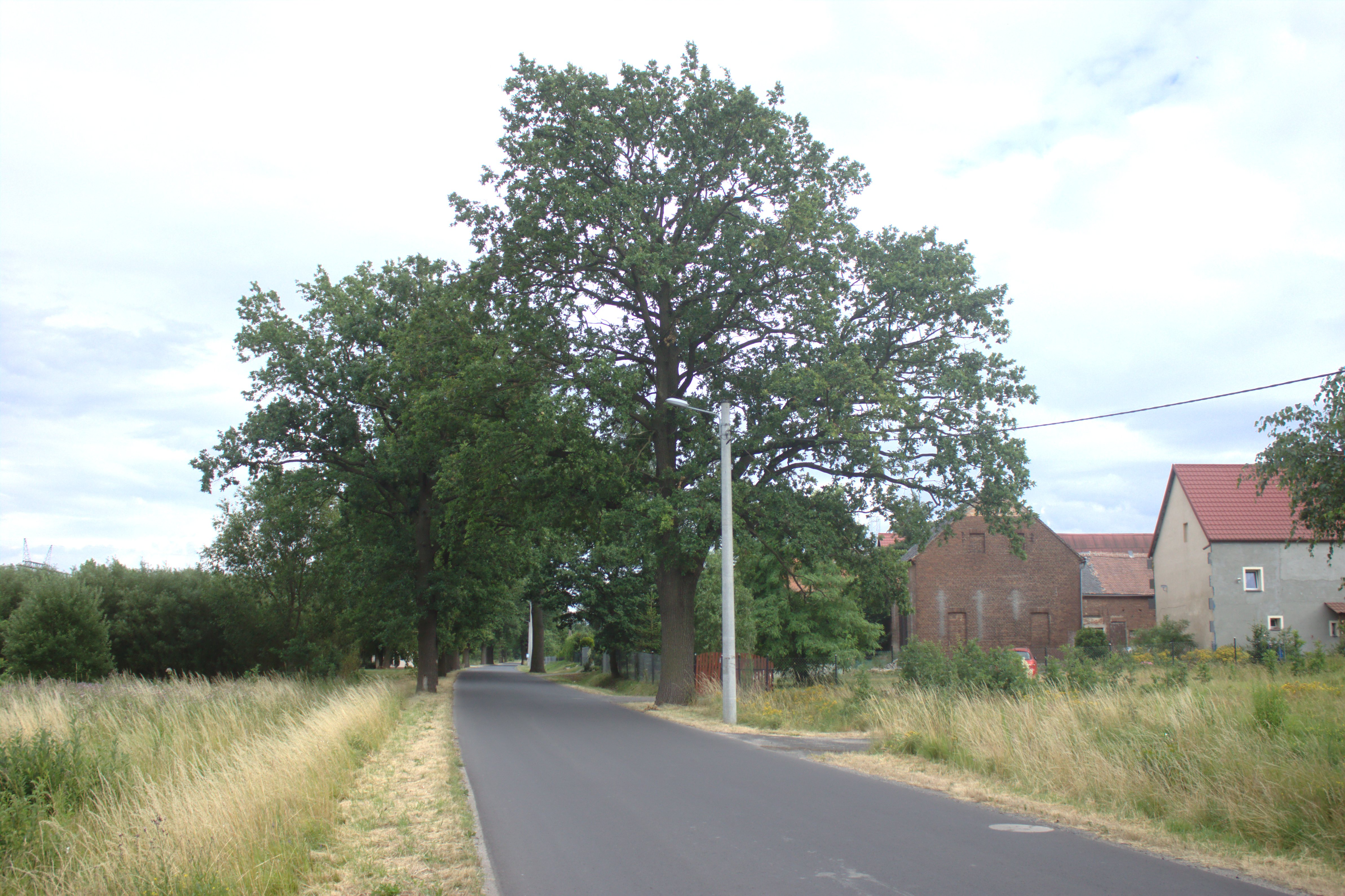
- Houses by the road

- Location within Poland
- Coordinates: 51°05′14″N 15°03′13″E
- Country: Poland
- Voivodeship: Lower Silesian
- County: Zgorzelec
- Gmina: Sulików

Mała Wieś Dolna [ˈmawa ˈvjɛɕ ˈdɔlna] (Upper Sorbian: Mała Wjes Dolna) is a village in the administrative district of Gmina Sulików, within Zgorzelec County, Lower Silesian Voivodeship, in south-western Poland, close to the Czech border.

== Gallery ==
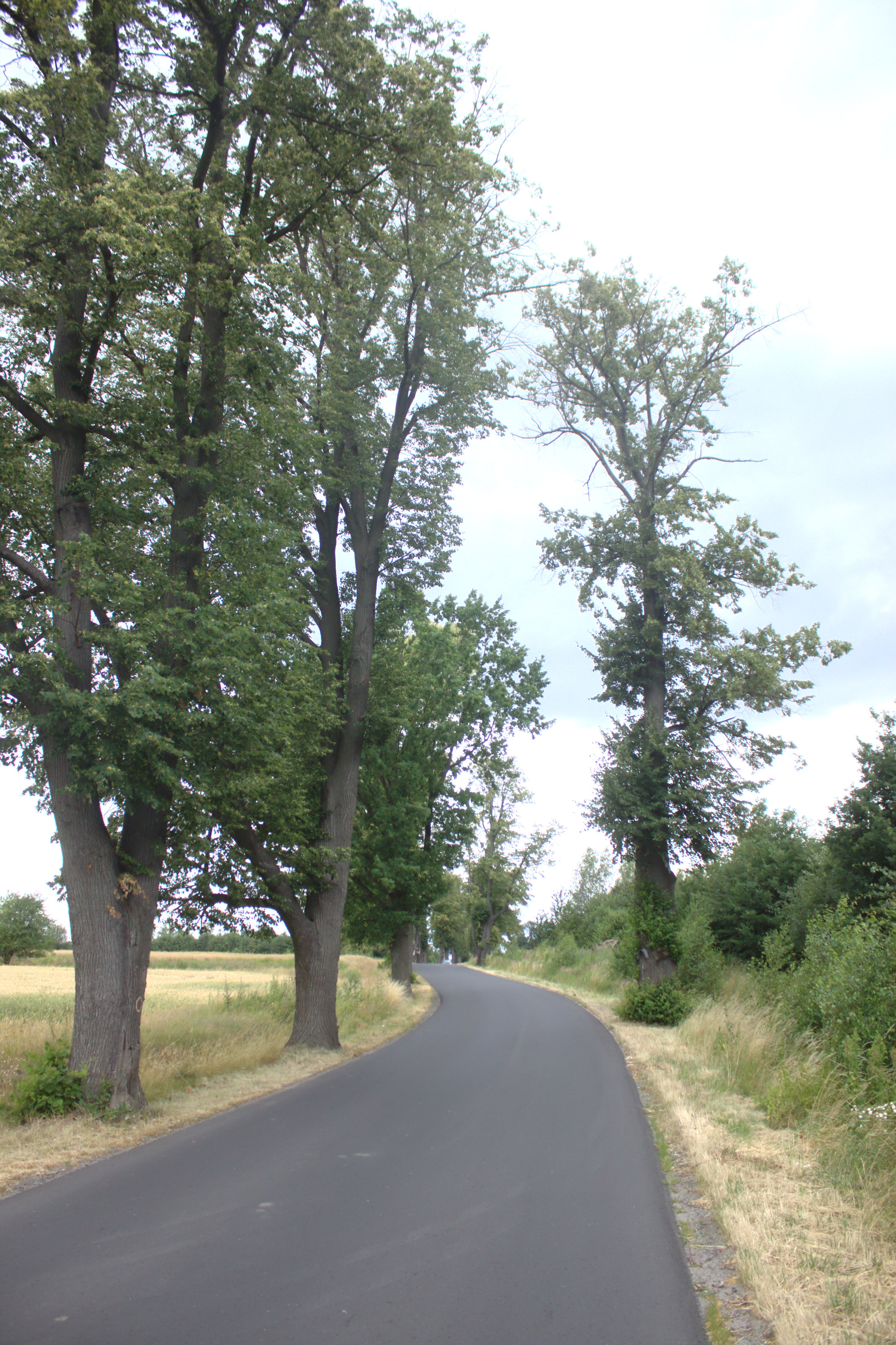
A road

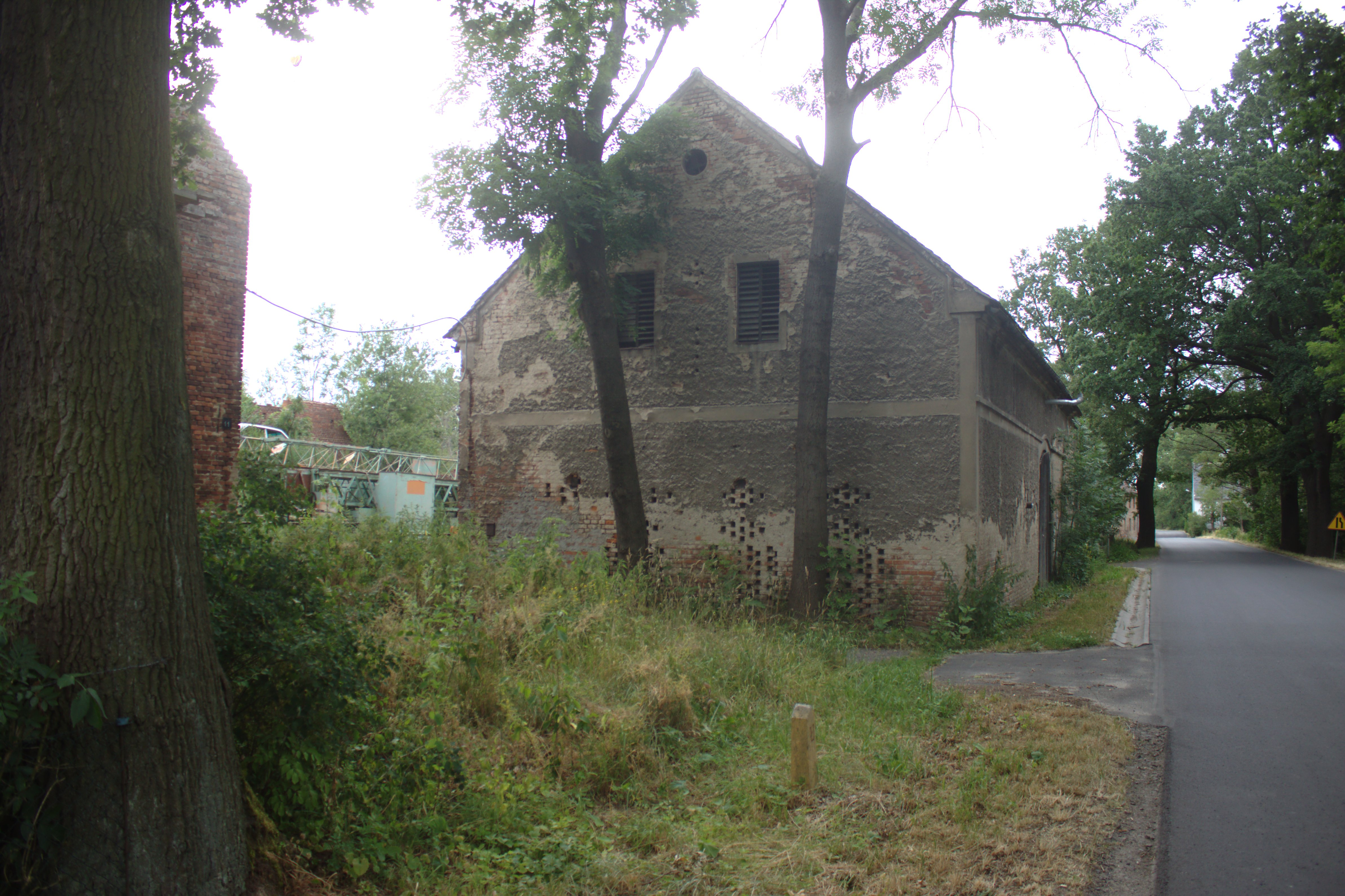
Barn

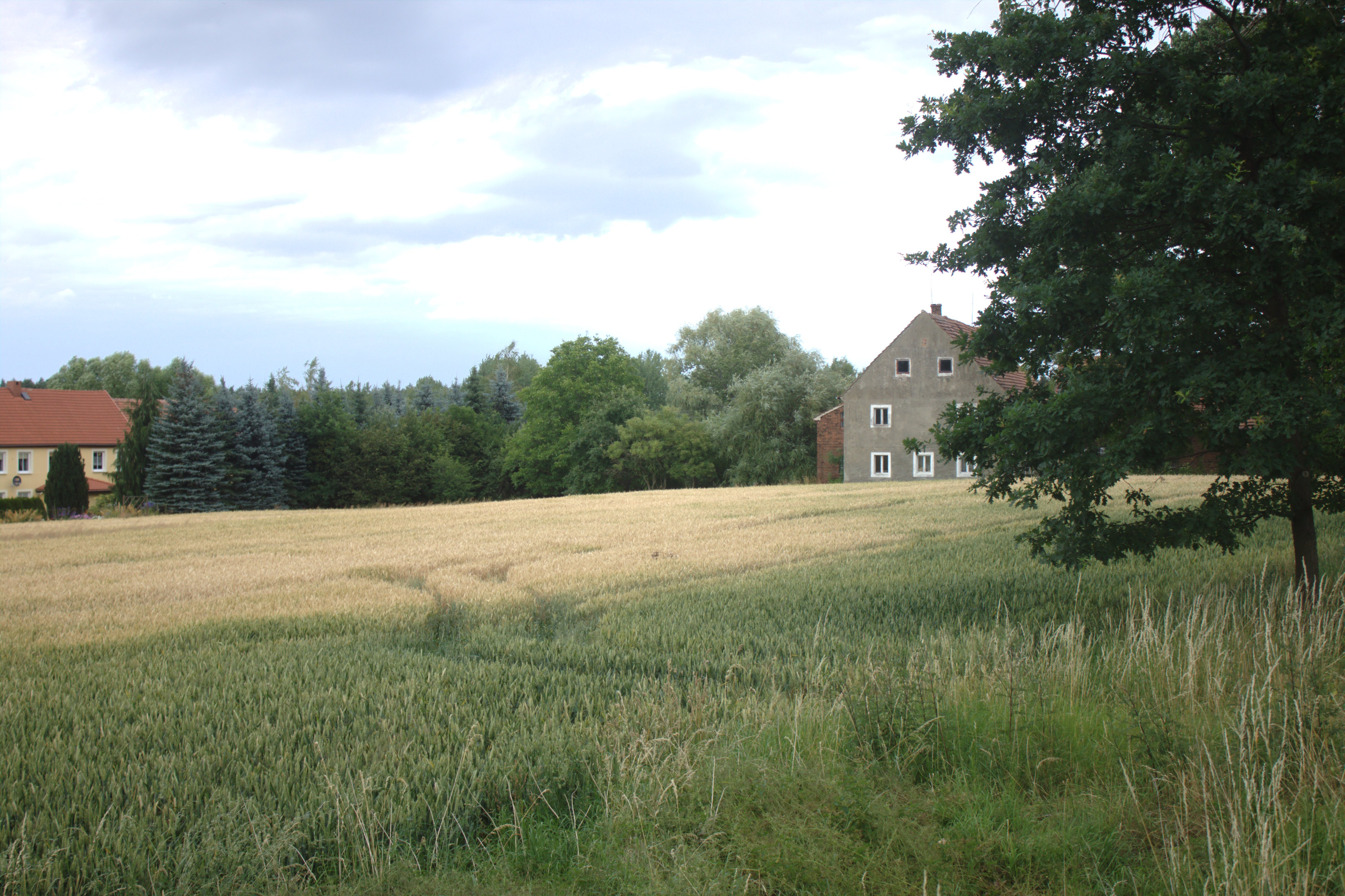
Field
