= Podgórze, Zgorzelec County =

Podgórze
- Village
- Location within Poland
- Coordinates: 51°05′15″N 15°04′46″E
- Country: Poland
- Voivodeship: Lower Silesian
- County: Zgorzelec
- Gmina: Sulików

Podgórze [pɔdˈɡuʐɛ] (Upper Sorbian: Podhorje) is a village in the administrative district of Gmina Sulików, within Zgorzelec County, Lower Silesian Voivodeship, in south-western Poland, close to the Czech border.
