= Wielichów =

- Village
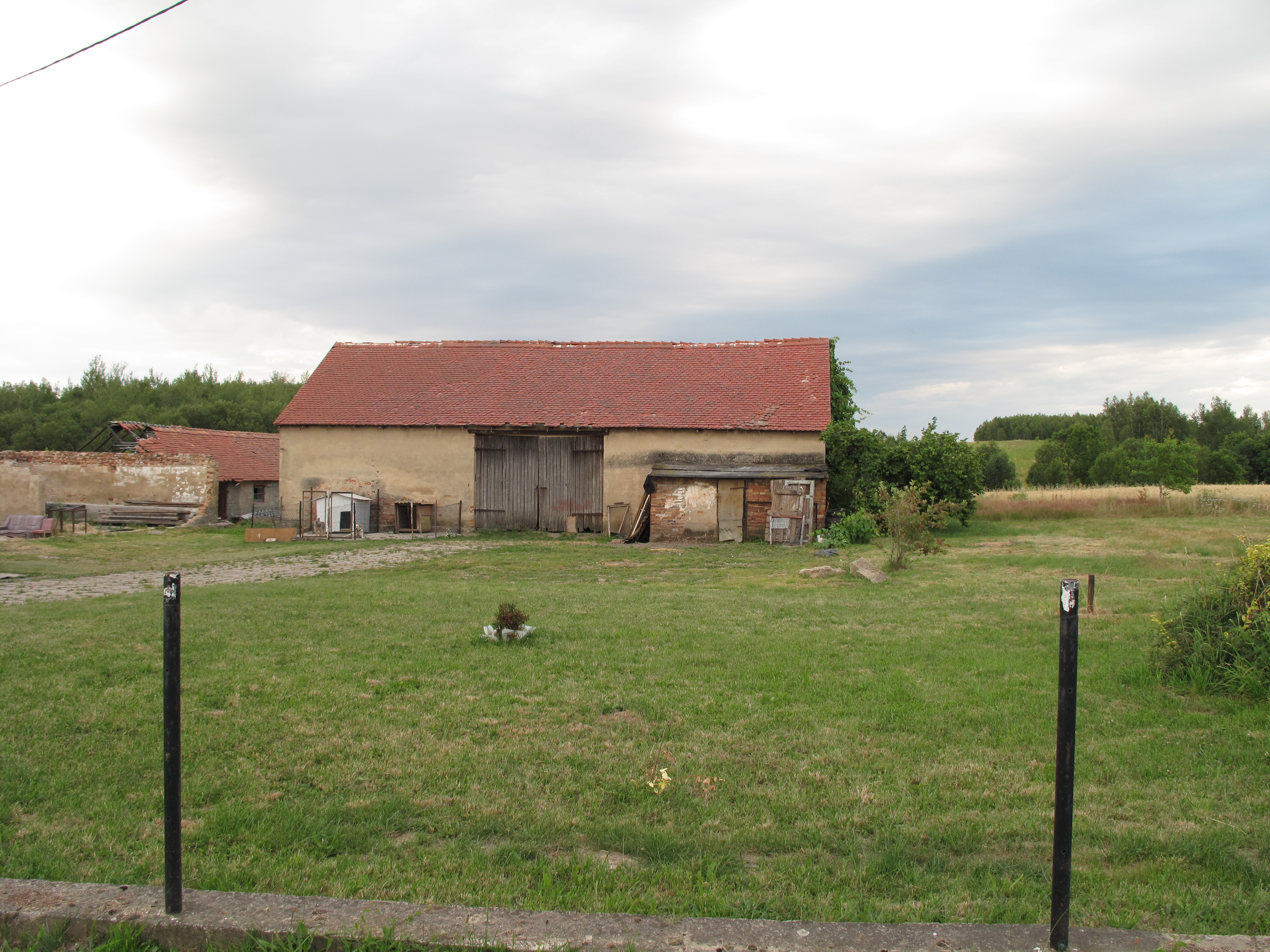
- A barn

- Location within Poland
- Coordinates: 51°02′07″N 15°05′58″E
- Country: Poland
- Voivodeship: Lower Silesian
- County: Zgorzelec
- Gmina: Sulików

Wielichów [vjɛˈlixuf] (Upper Sorbian: Wjelichow) is a village in the administrative district of Gmina Sulików, within Zgorzelec County, Lower Silesian Voivodeship, in south-western Poland, close to the Czech border.

== Gallery ==
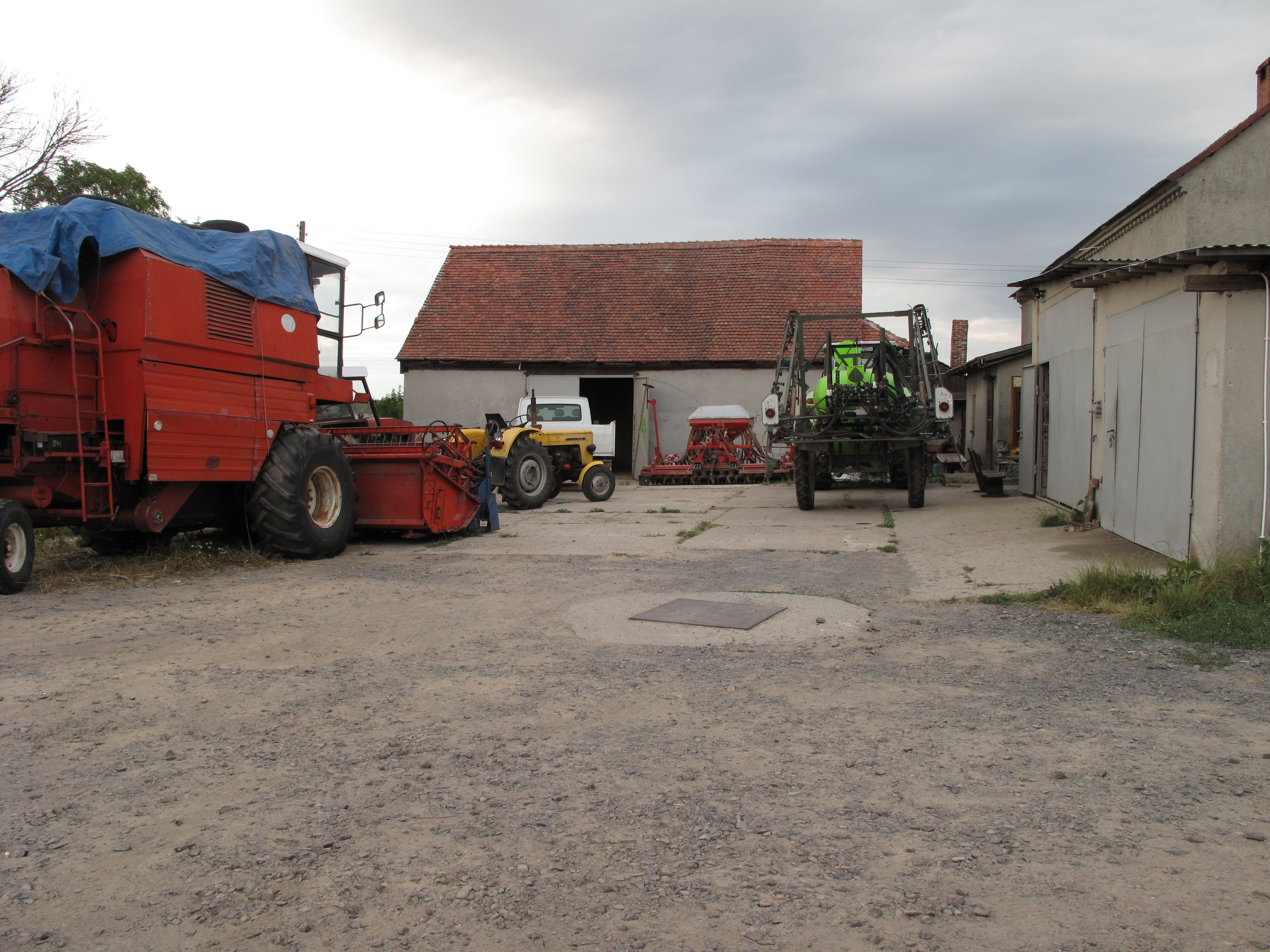
Yard with agriculture machinery

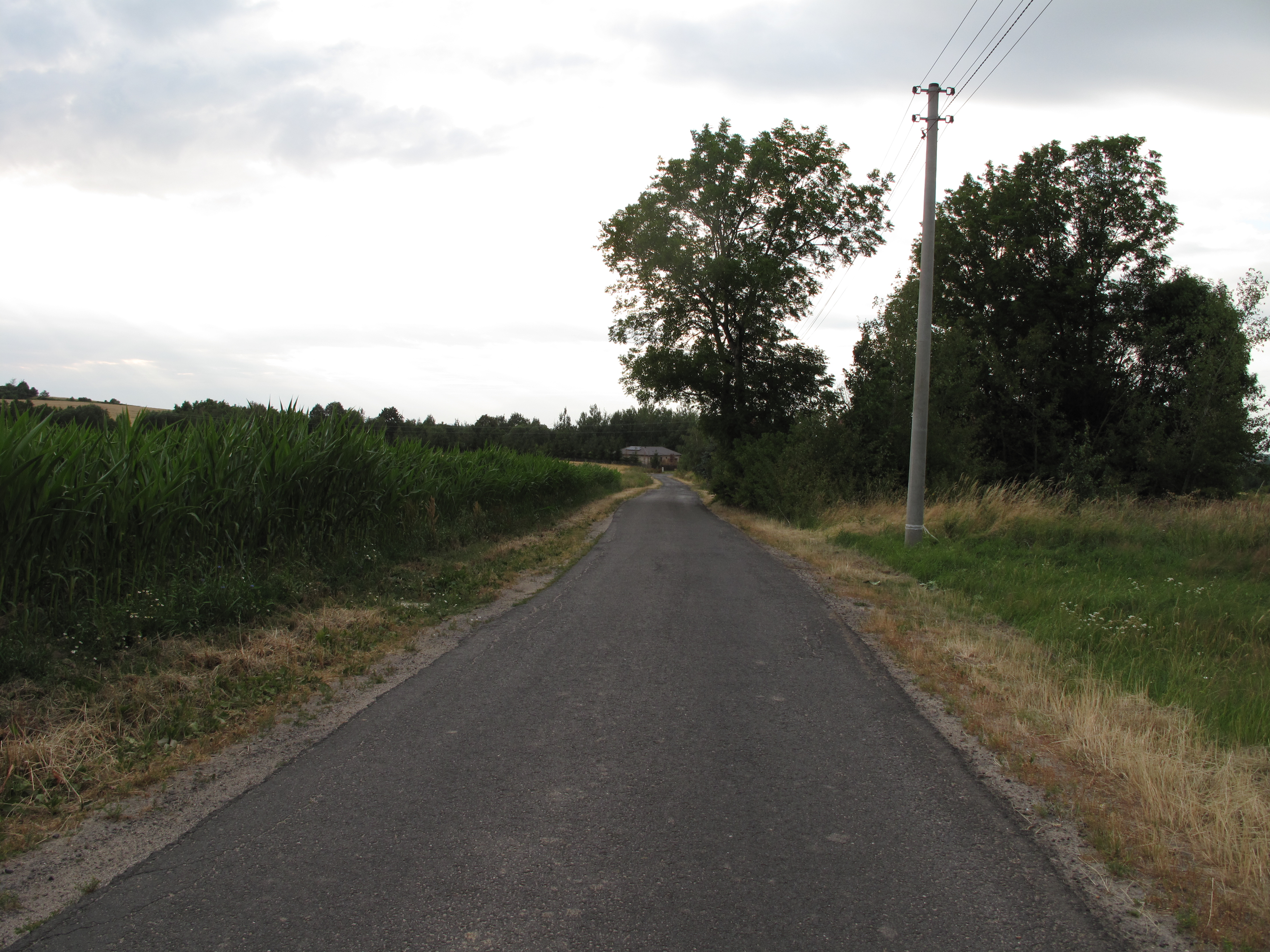
Road

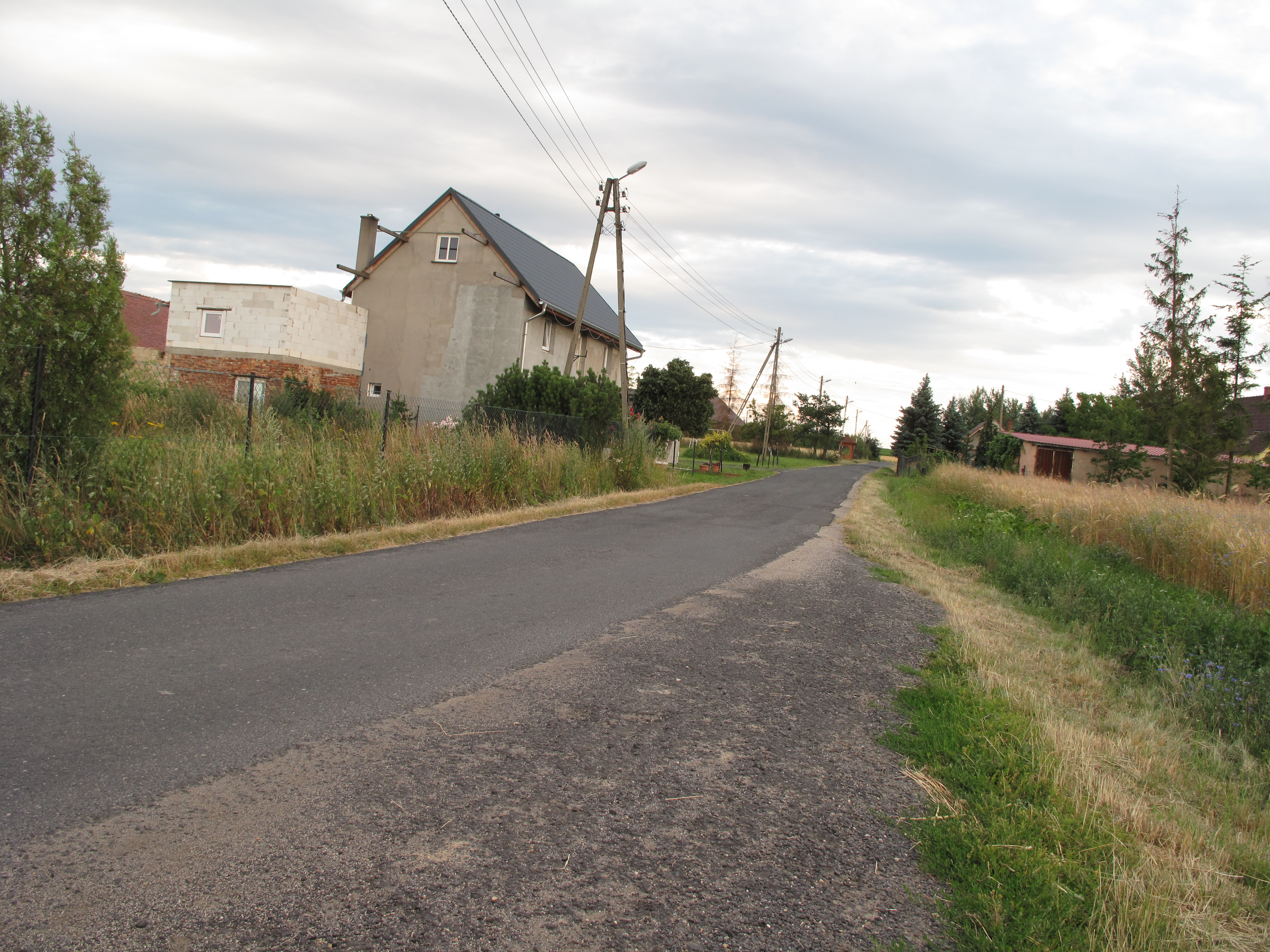
House by the road

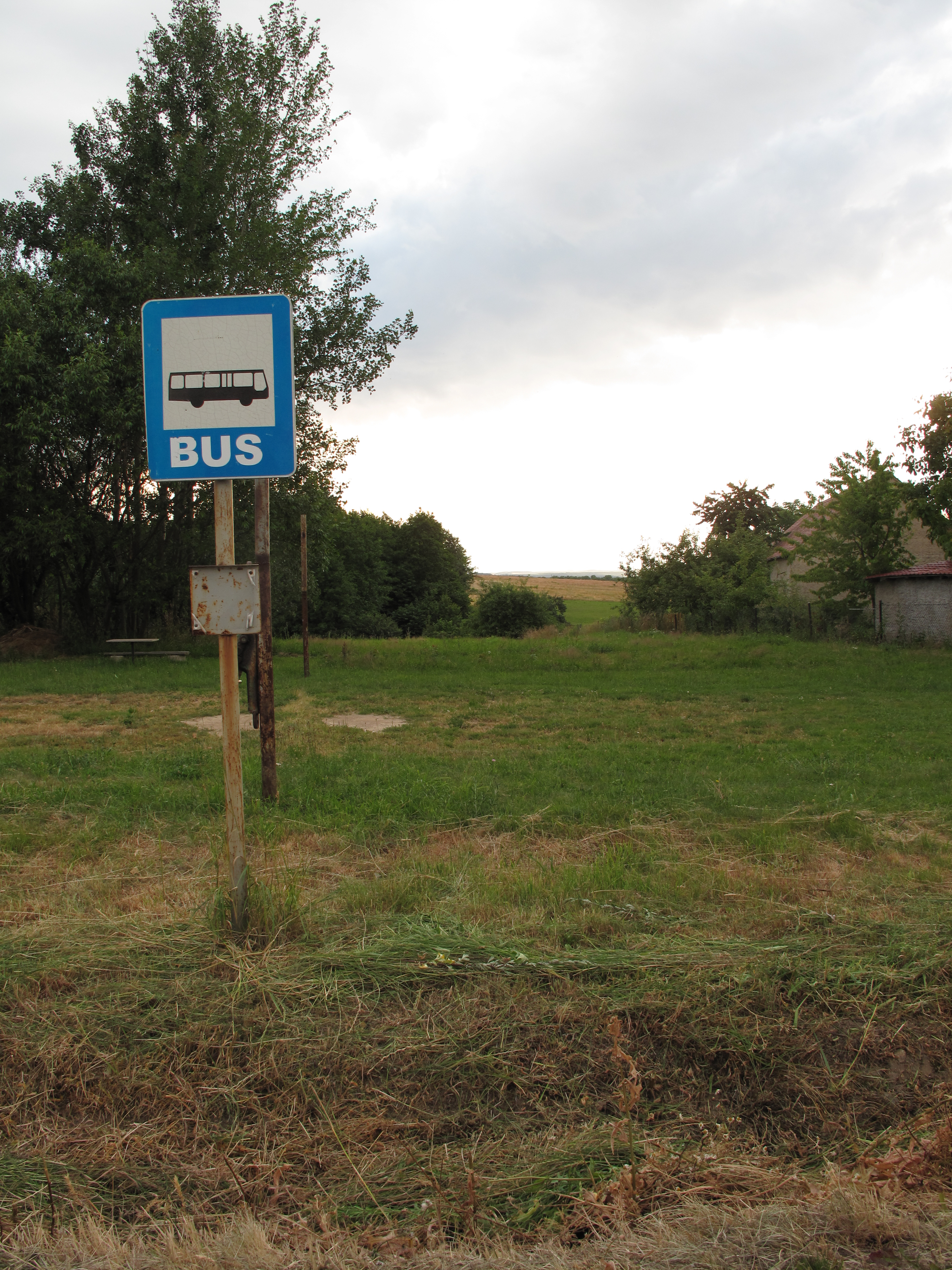
Bus stop
