= Bierna, Lower Silesian Voivodeship =

Bierna
- Village
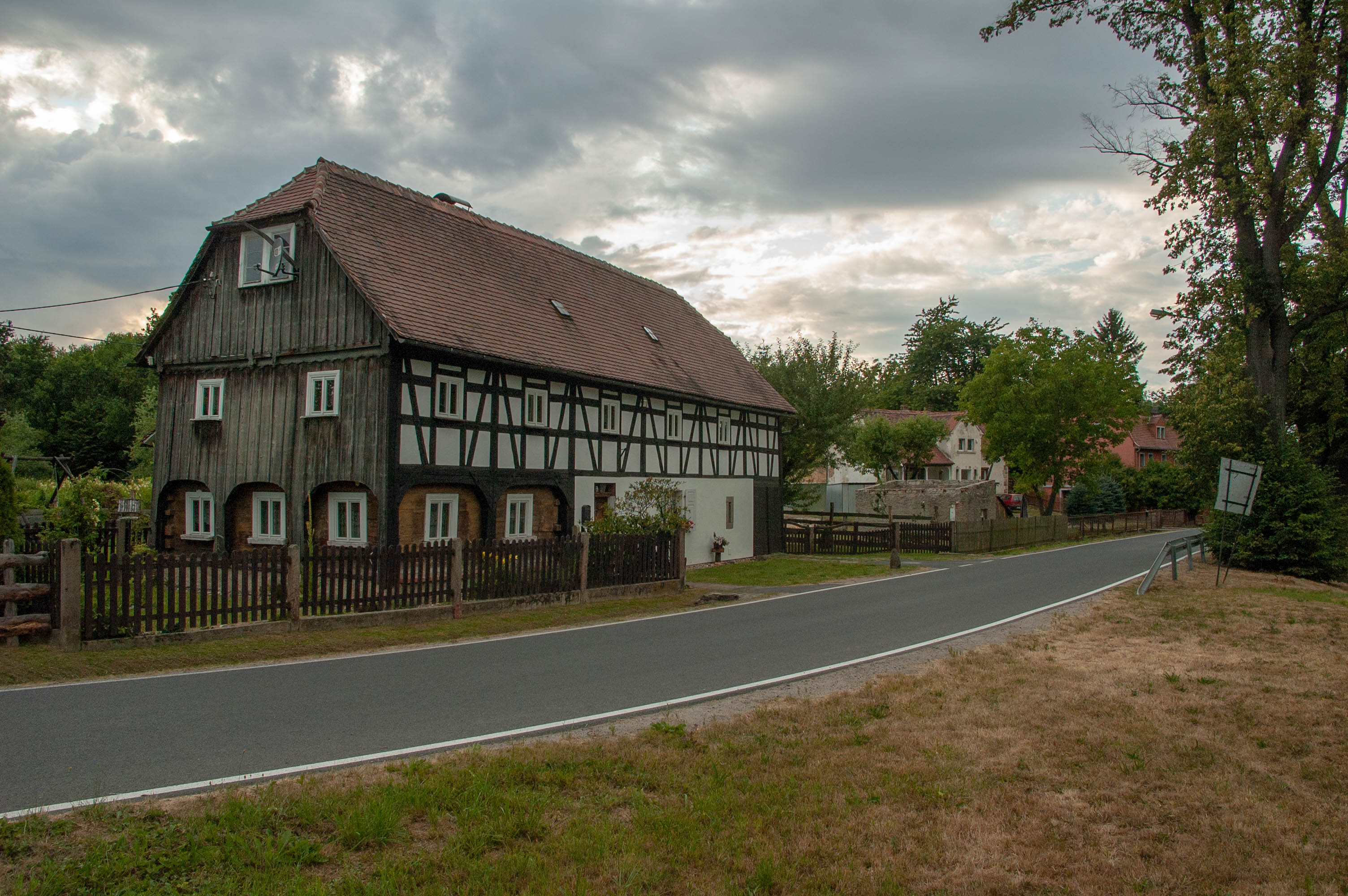

- Location within Poland
- Coordinates: 51°02′06″N 15°07′14″E
- Country: Poland
- Voivodeship: Lower Silesian
- County: Zgorzelec
- Gmina: Sulików
- Time zone: UTC+1 (CET)
  - Summer (DST): UTC+2 (CEST)
- Vehicle registration: DZG

Bierna [ˈbjɛrna] is a village in the administrative district of Gmina Sulików, within Zgorzelec County, Lower Silesian Voivodeship, in south-western Poland, close to the Czech border. It is situated on the Czerwona Woda River.

== Gallery ==
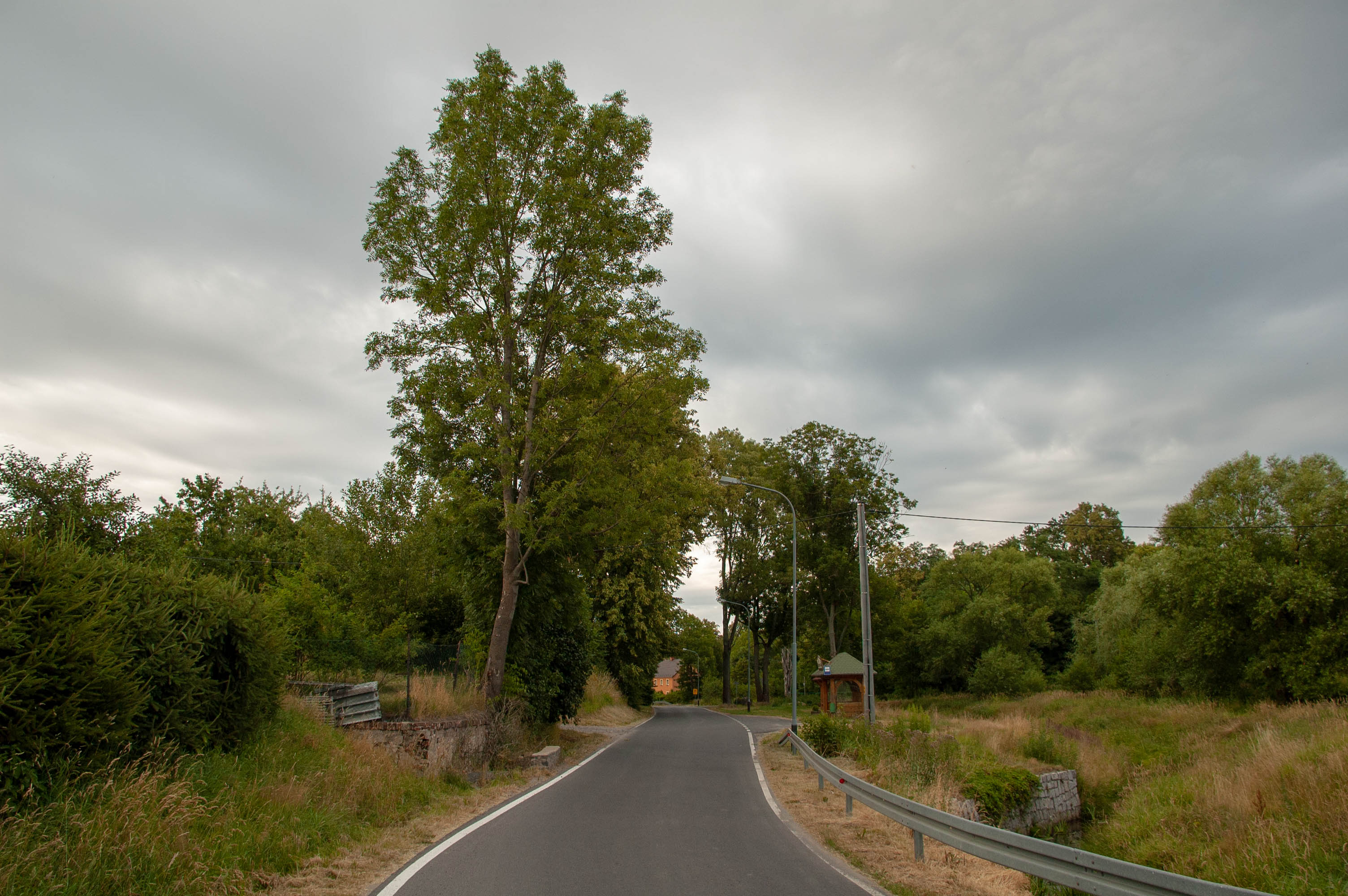
Road

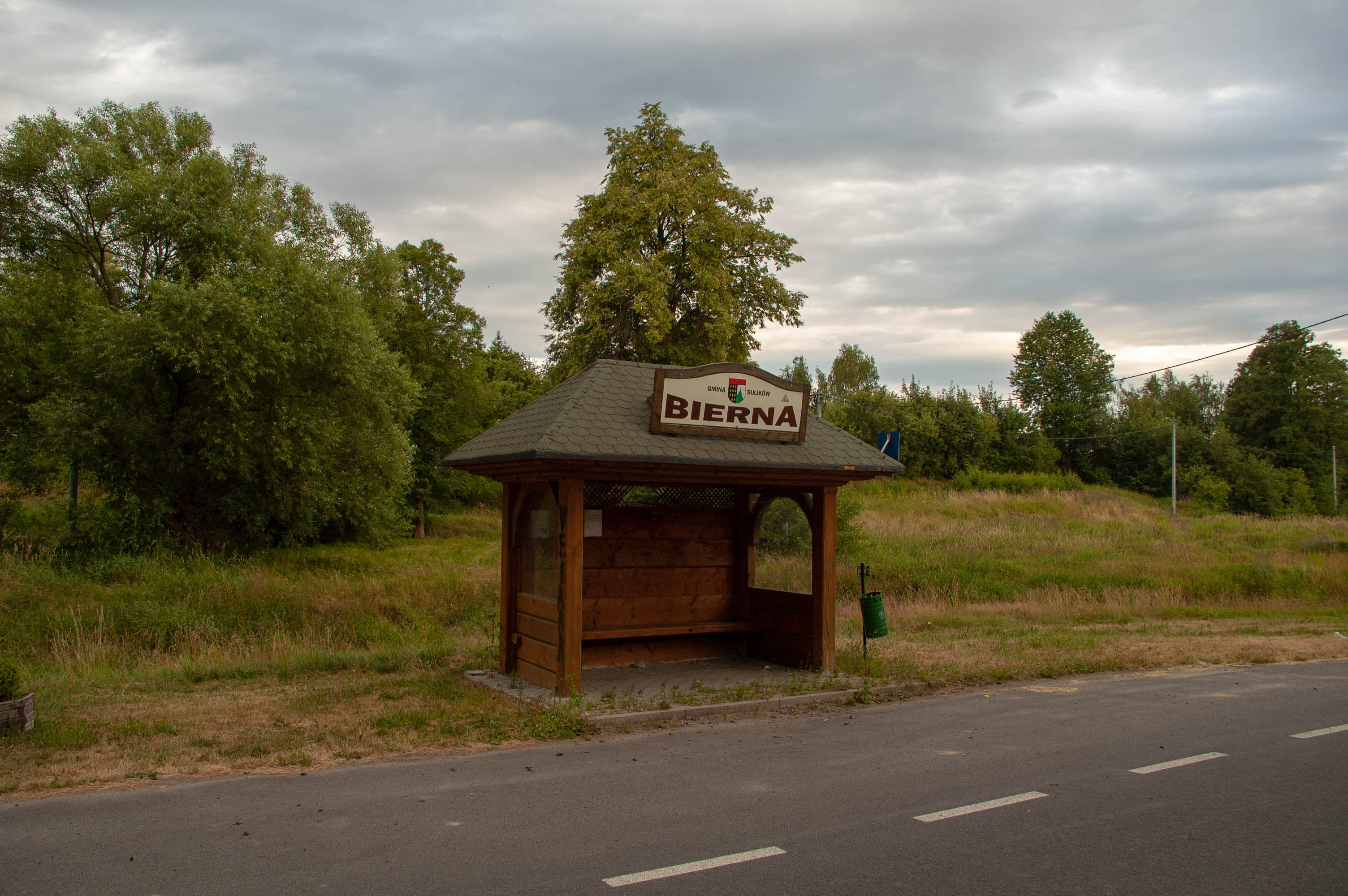
Bus stop shelter

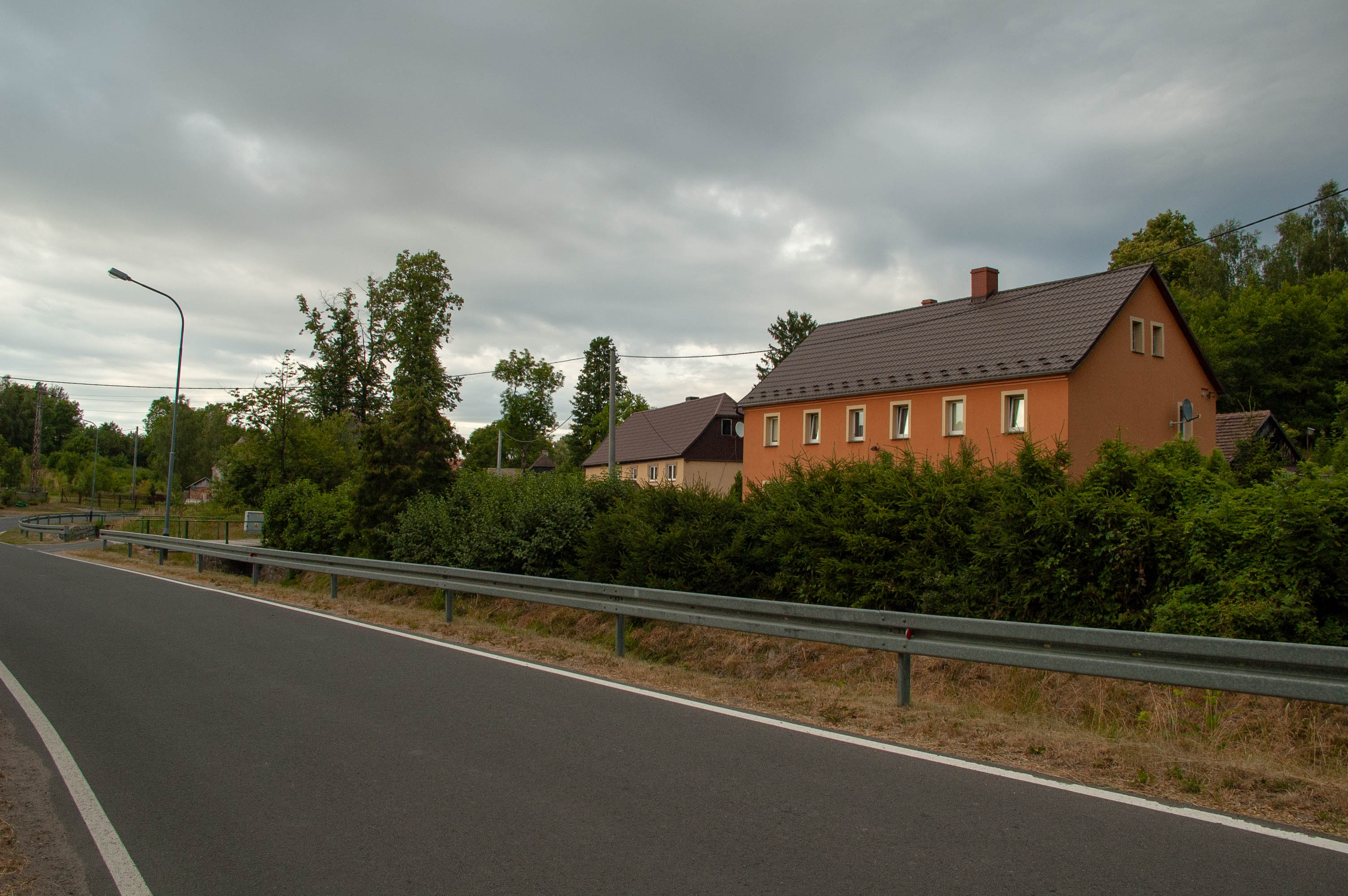
Houses by the road

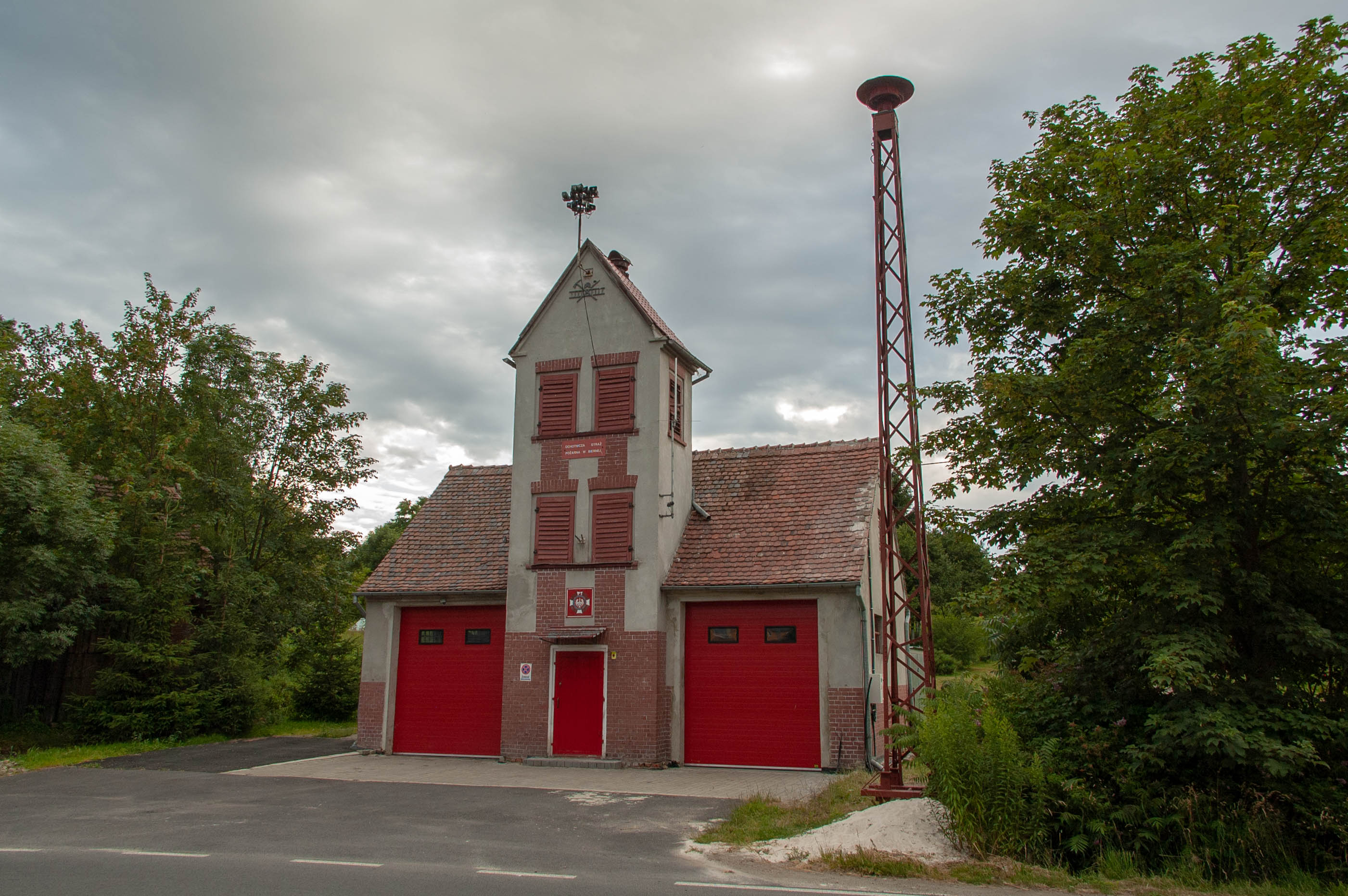
Volunteer fire department
