= Miedziana =

- Village
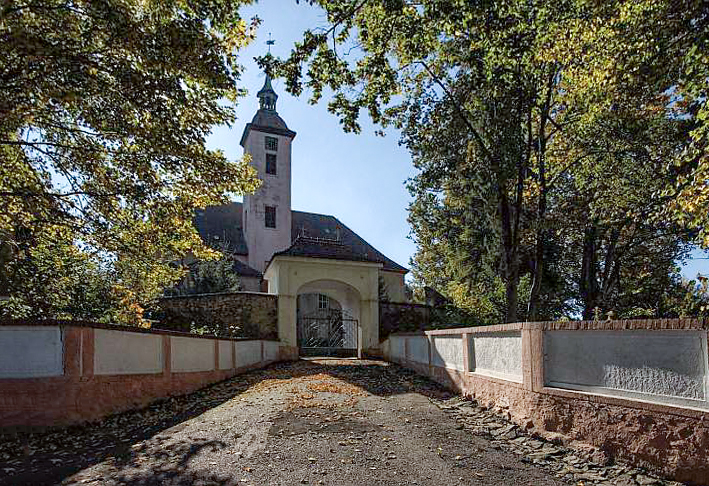
- Saints Peter and Paul Church, Miedziana

- Location within Poland
- Coordinates: 51°01′10″N 15°07′28″E
- Country: Poland
- Voivodeship: Lower Silesian
- County: Zgorzelec
- Gmina: Sulików

Miedziana [mjɛˈd͡ʑana] is a village in the administrative district of Gmina Sulików, within Zgorzelec County, Lower Silesian Voivodeship, in south-western Poland, close to the Czech border.

== Gallery ==
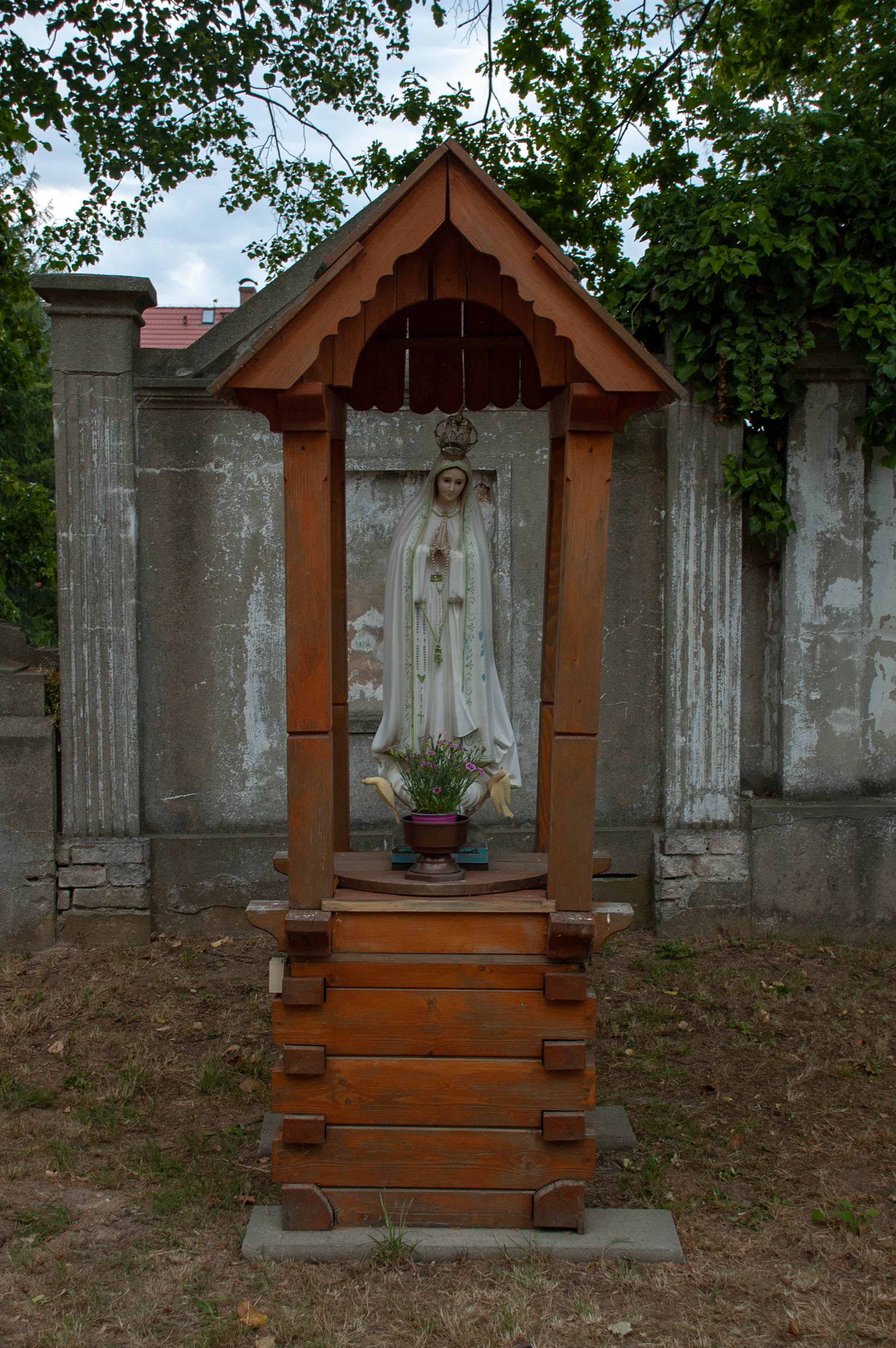
Statue near the church

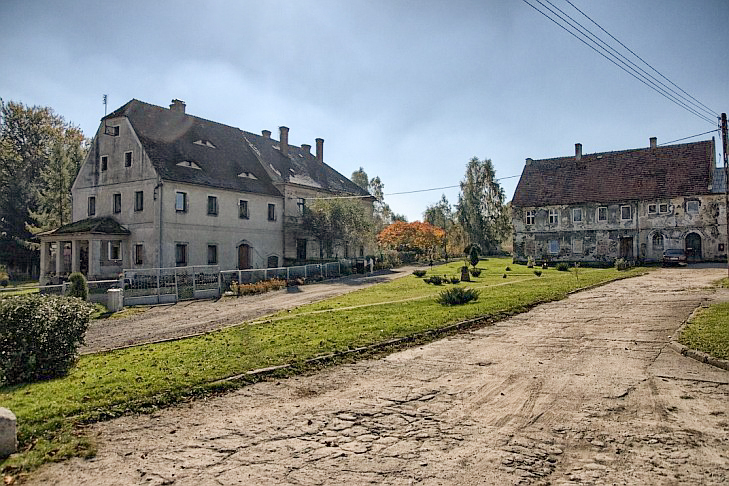
Palace

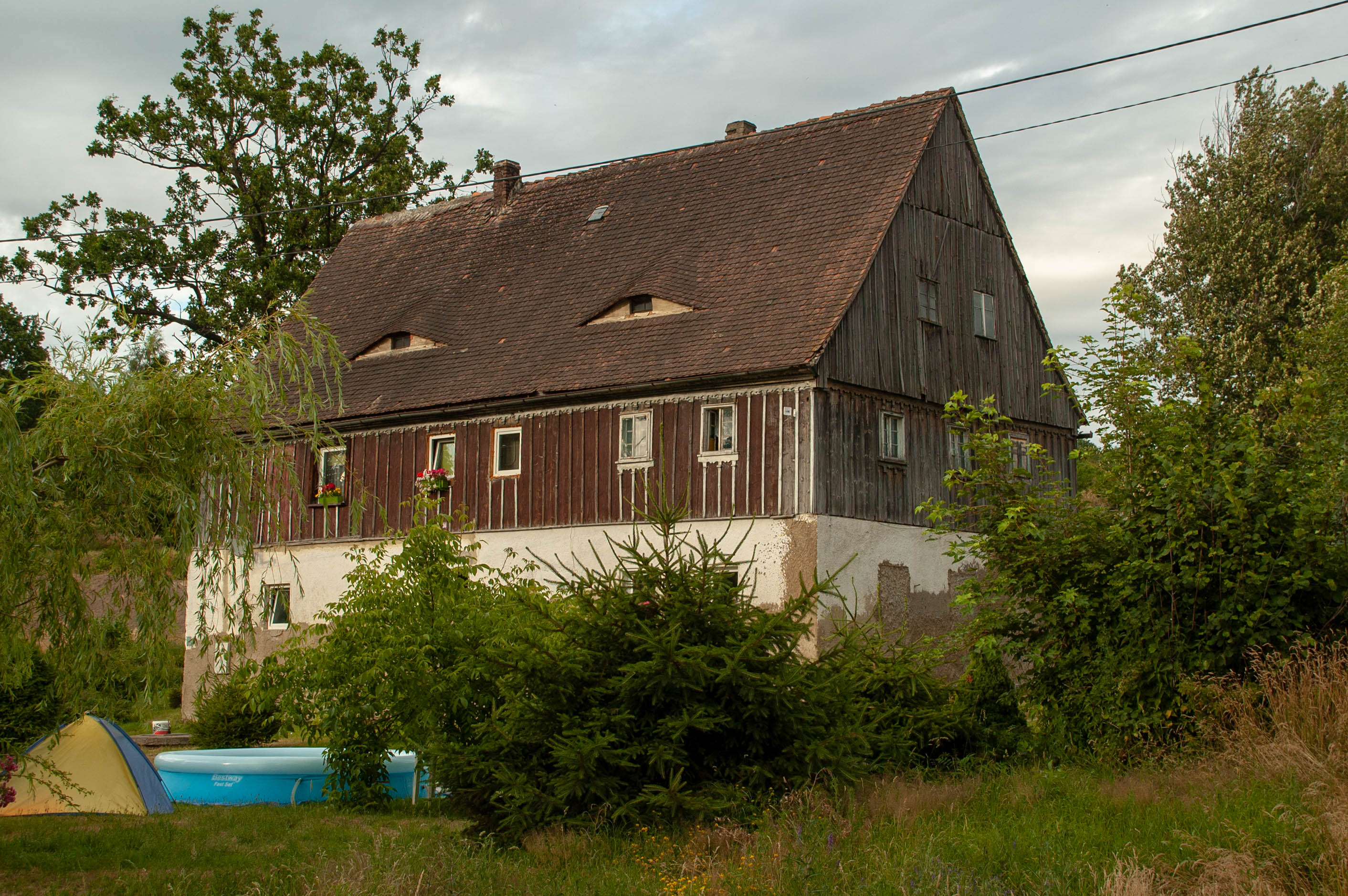
House

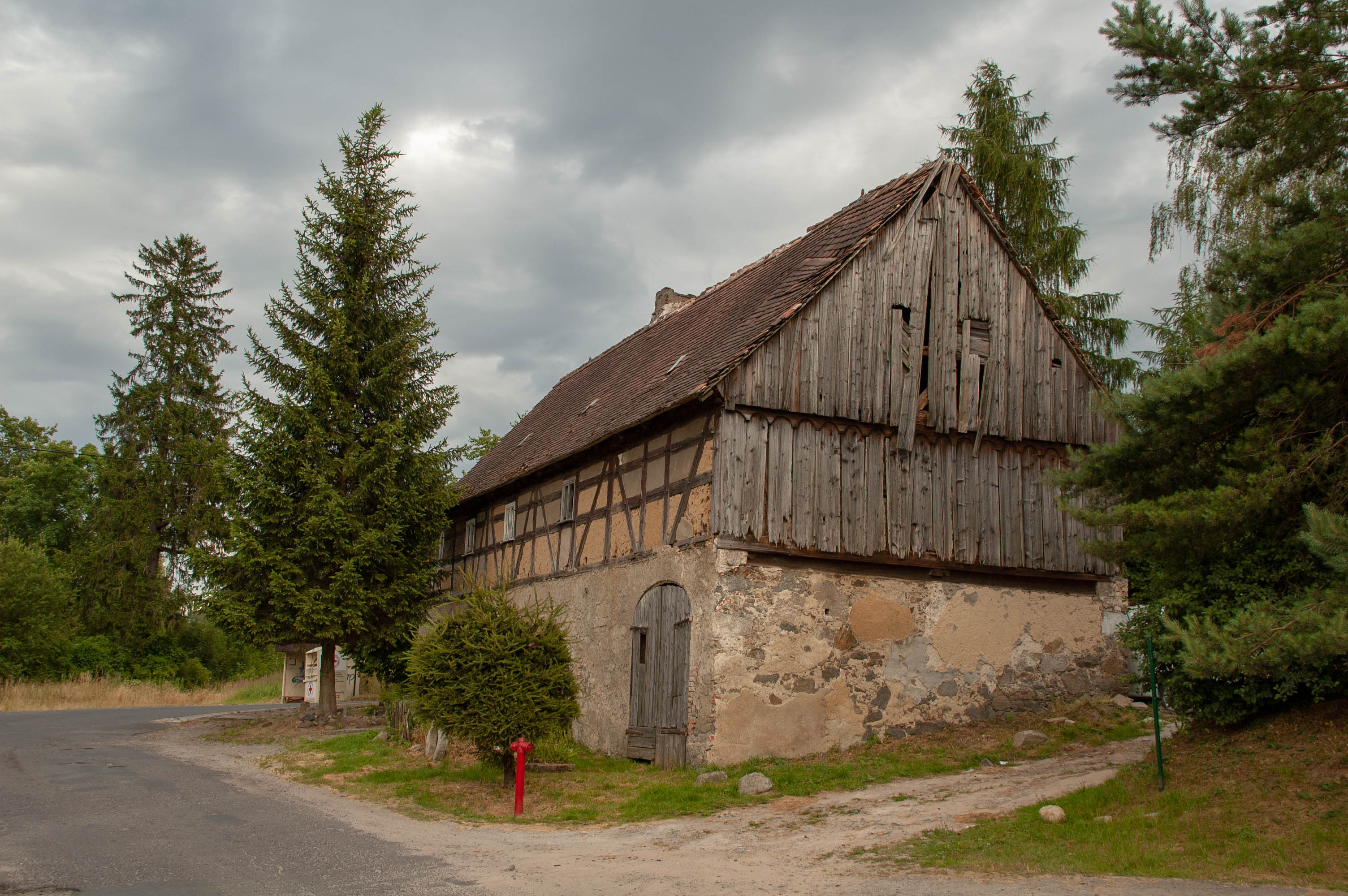
Old half-timbered house
