= Wilka (disambiguation) =

Wilka is a village in Gmina Sulików, Zgorzelec County, Lower Silesian Voivodeship, Poland.

Wilka may also refer to:

- Wilka-Bory, a village in Gmina Sulików, Zgorzelec County, Lower Silesian Voivodeship, Poland
- Patricia Wilka (born 1972), Paraguayan pistol shooter
- William Wilka (born 1947), Paraguayan sports shooter

== See also ==
- Willka, a Bolivian indigenous caudillo during the Bolivian Civil War (1898–1899)
- Wilkas
