= Wilka =

- Village
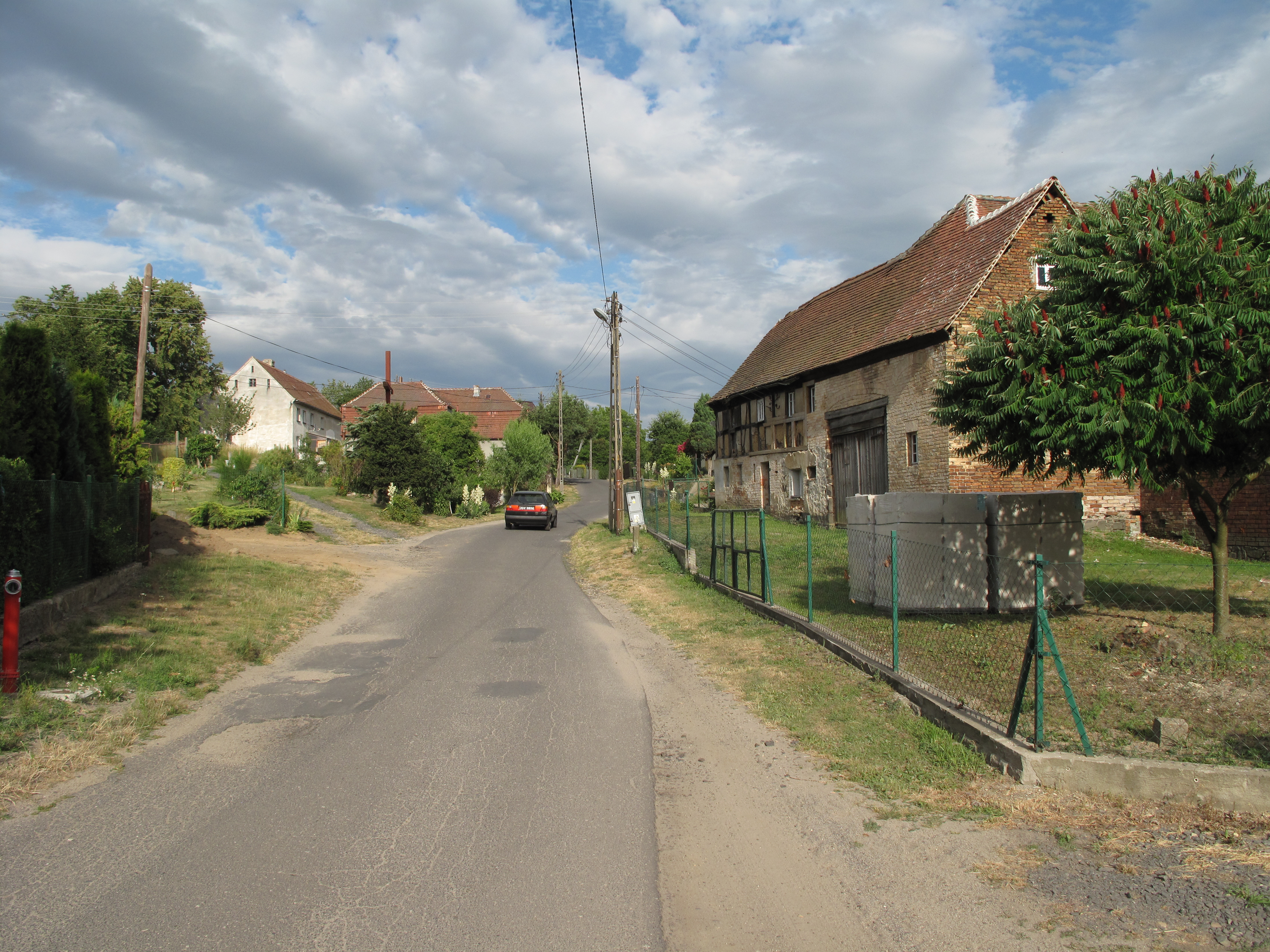
- Road with houses

- Location within Poland
- Coordinates: 51°02′15″N 15°00′58″E
- Country: Poland
- Voivodeship: Lower Silesian
- County: Zgorzelec
- Gmina: Sulików

Wilka [ˈvilka] (Upper Sorbian: Wjelka) is a village in the administrative district of Gmina Sulików, within Zgorzelec County, Lower Silesian Voivodeship, in south-western Poland, close to the Czech border.

== Gallery ==
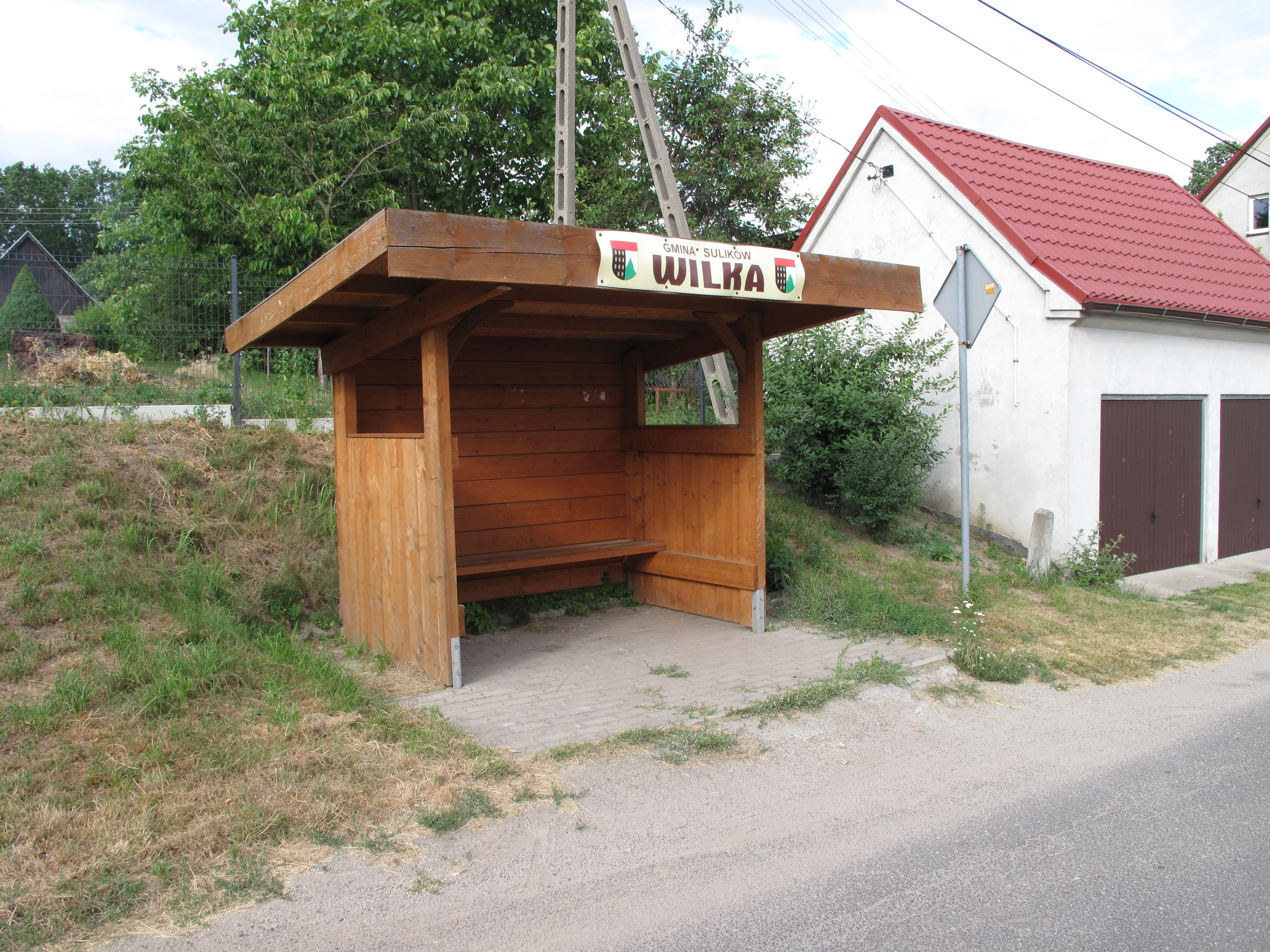
Bus stop shelter

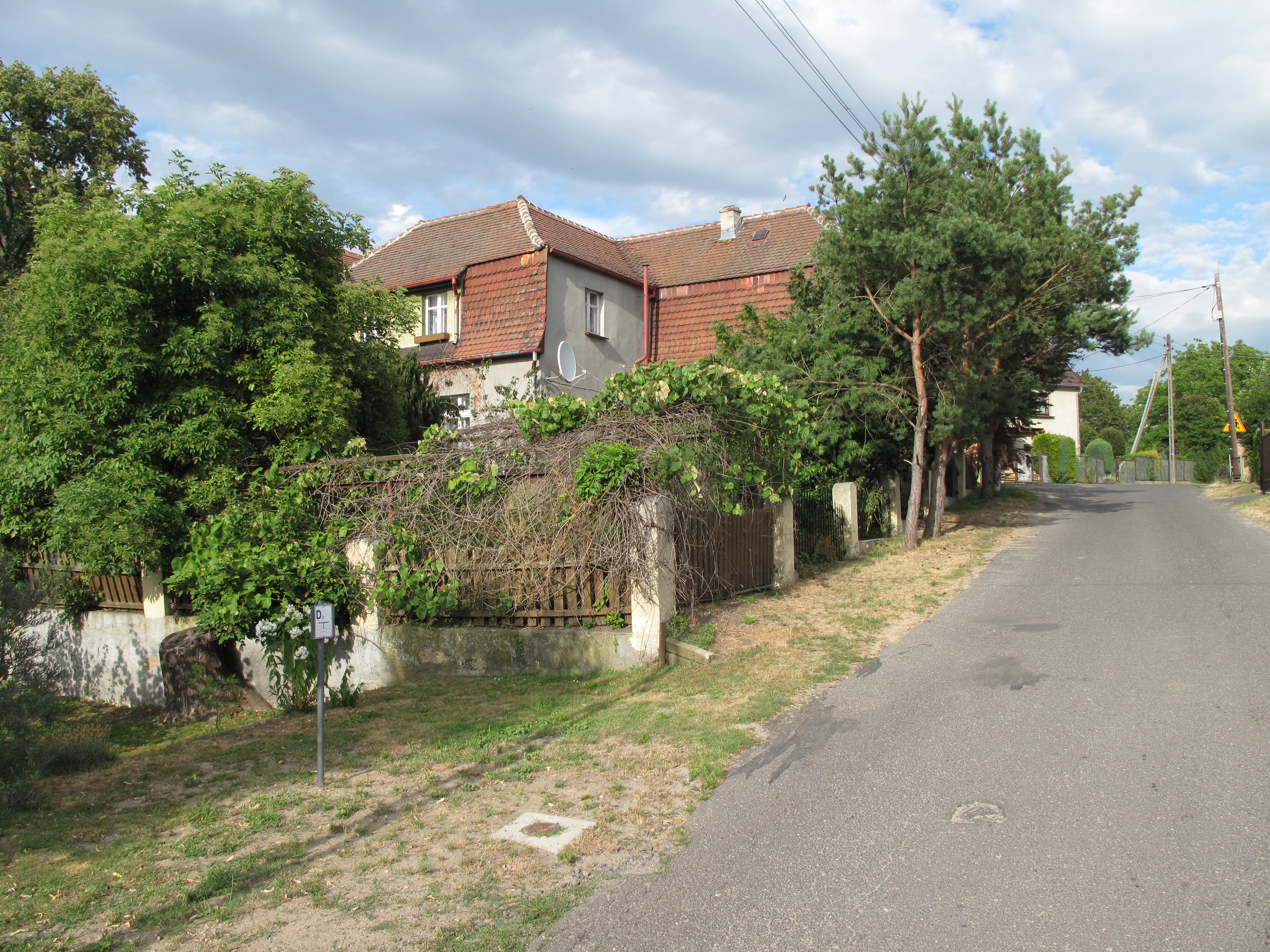
House with the garden

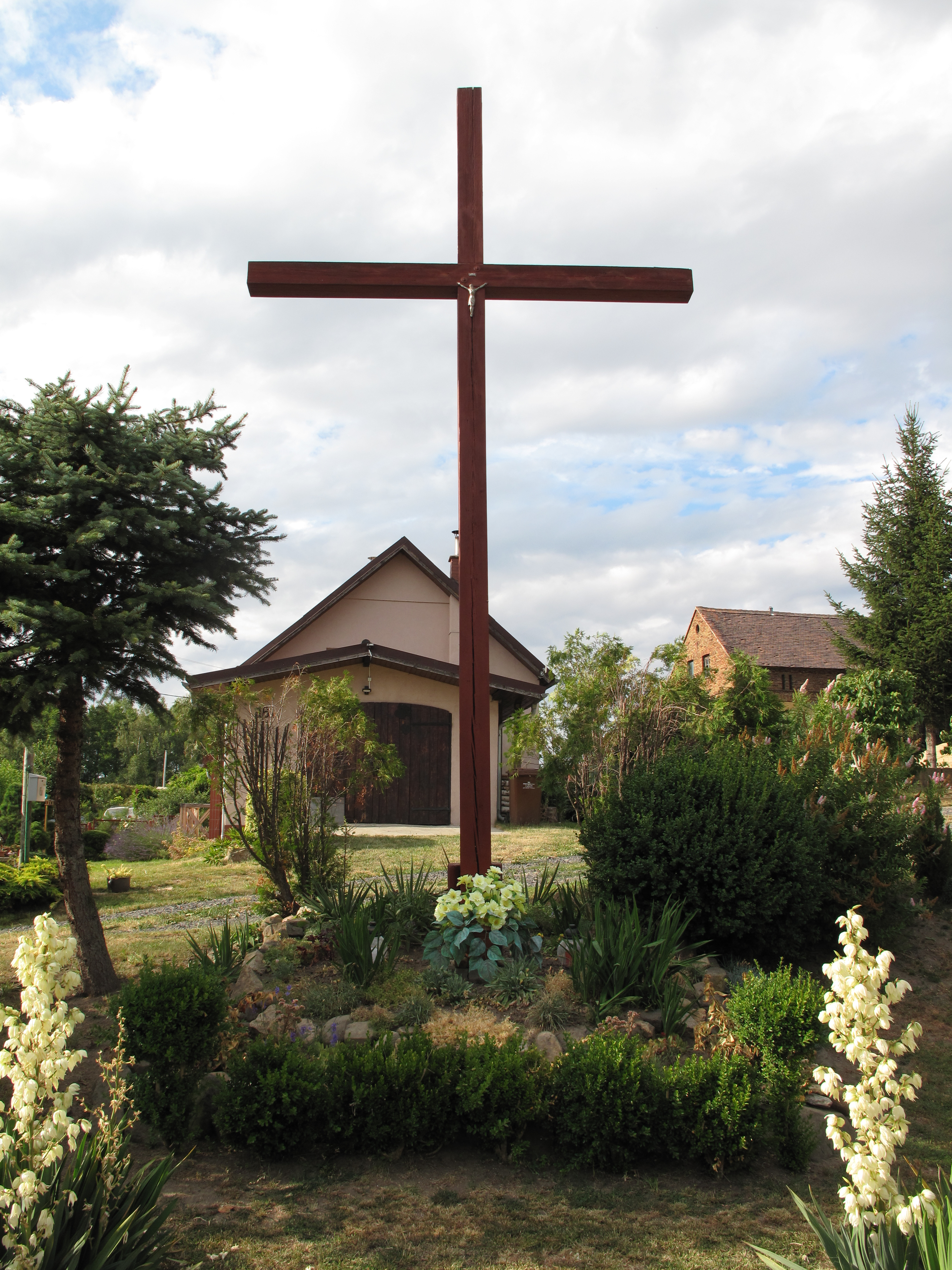
Wooden cross
