= Wilka-Bory =

- Village
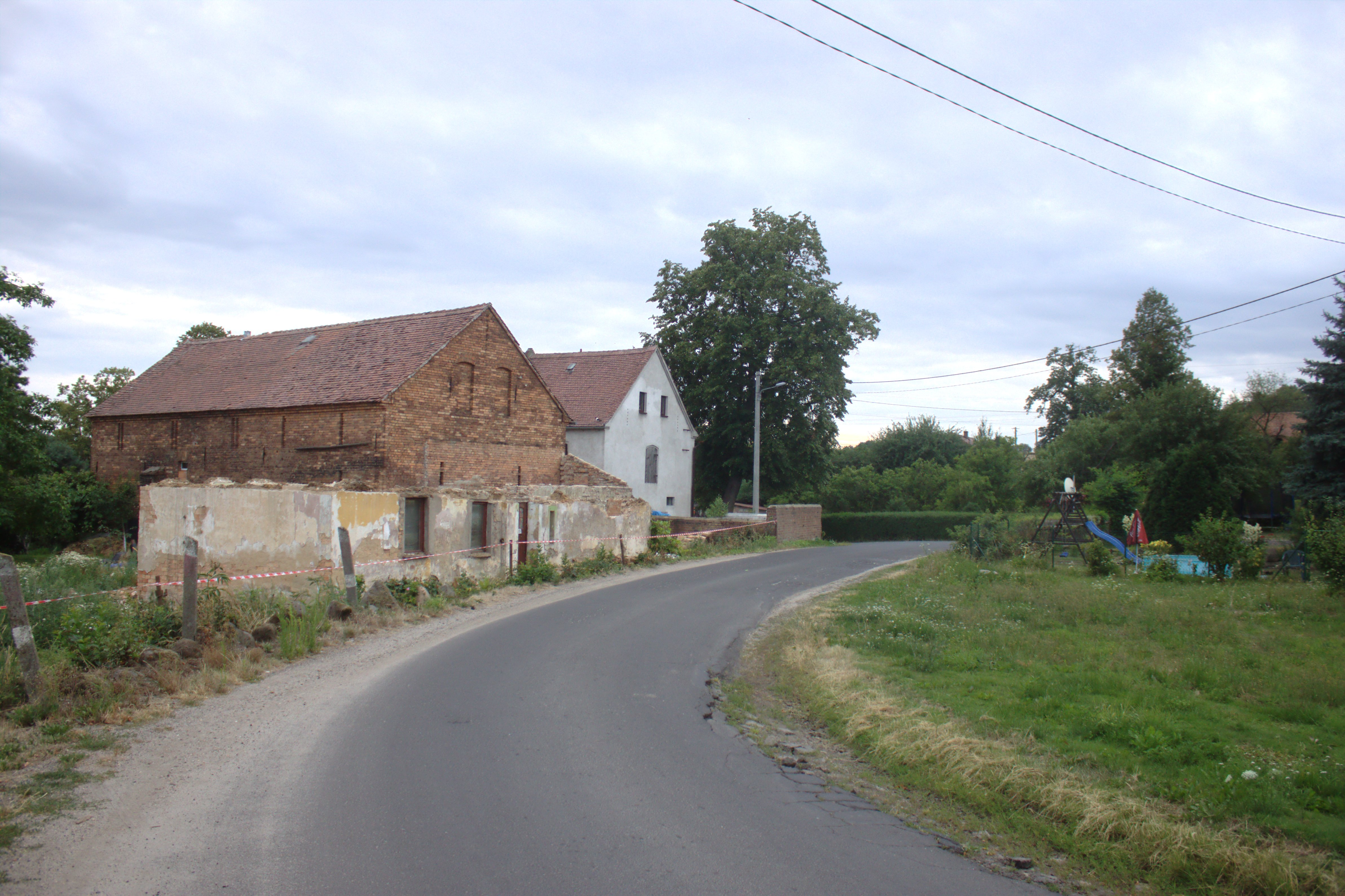
- Houses by the road

- Location within Poland
- Coordinates: 51°02′17″N 15°00′41″E
- Country: Poland
- Voivodeship: Lower Silesian
- County: Zgorzelec
- Gmina: Sulików

Wilka-Bory [ˈvilka ˈbɔrɨ] (Upper Sorbian: Wjelka-Bory) is a village in the administrative district of Gmina Sulików, within Zgorzelec County, Lower Silesian Voivodeship, in south-western Poland, close to the Czech border.

== Gallery ==
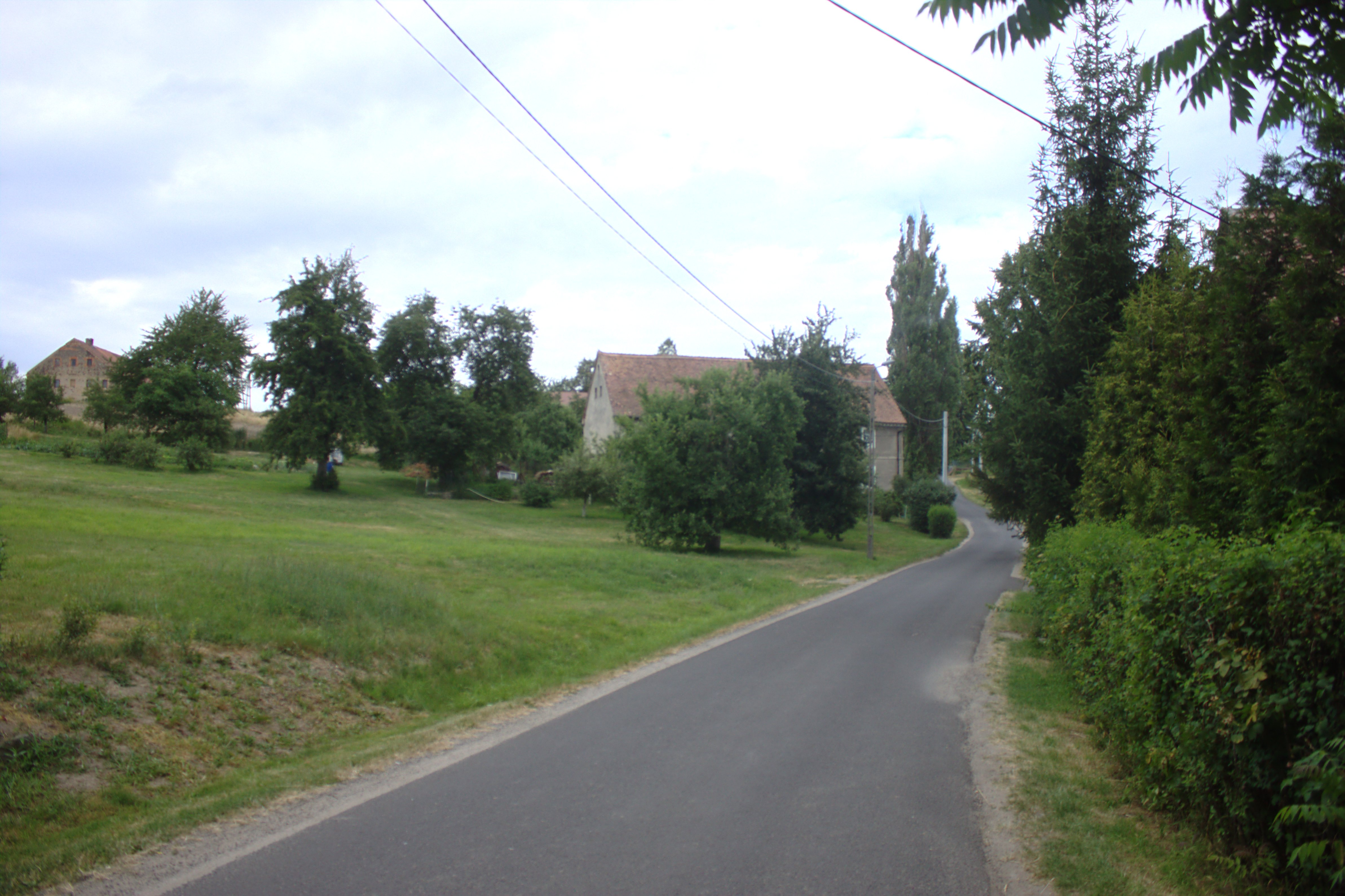
Houses with gardens

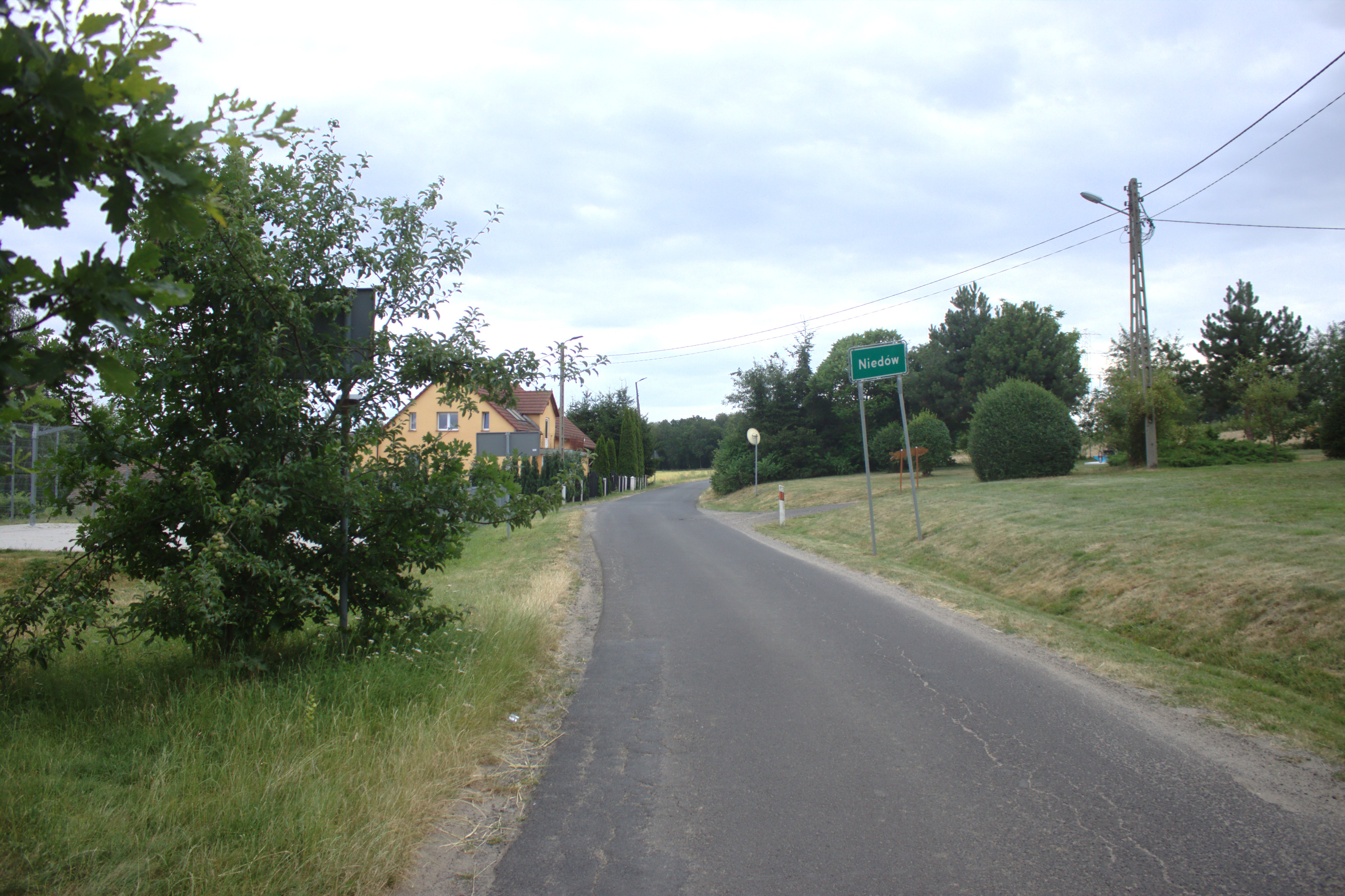
Main road

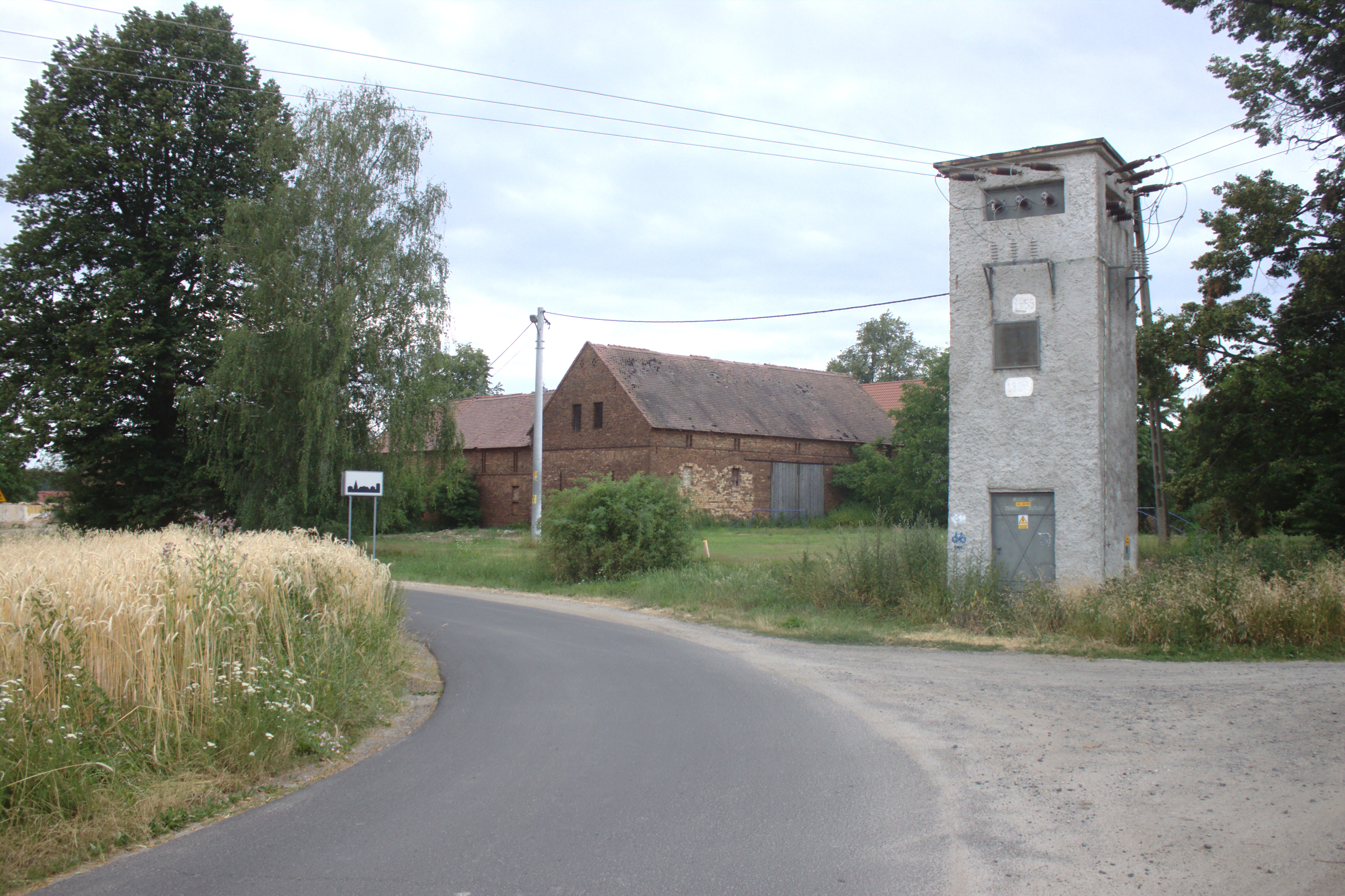
Electric tower
