= Skrzydlice =

- Village
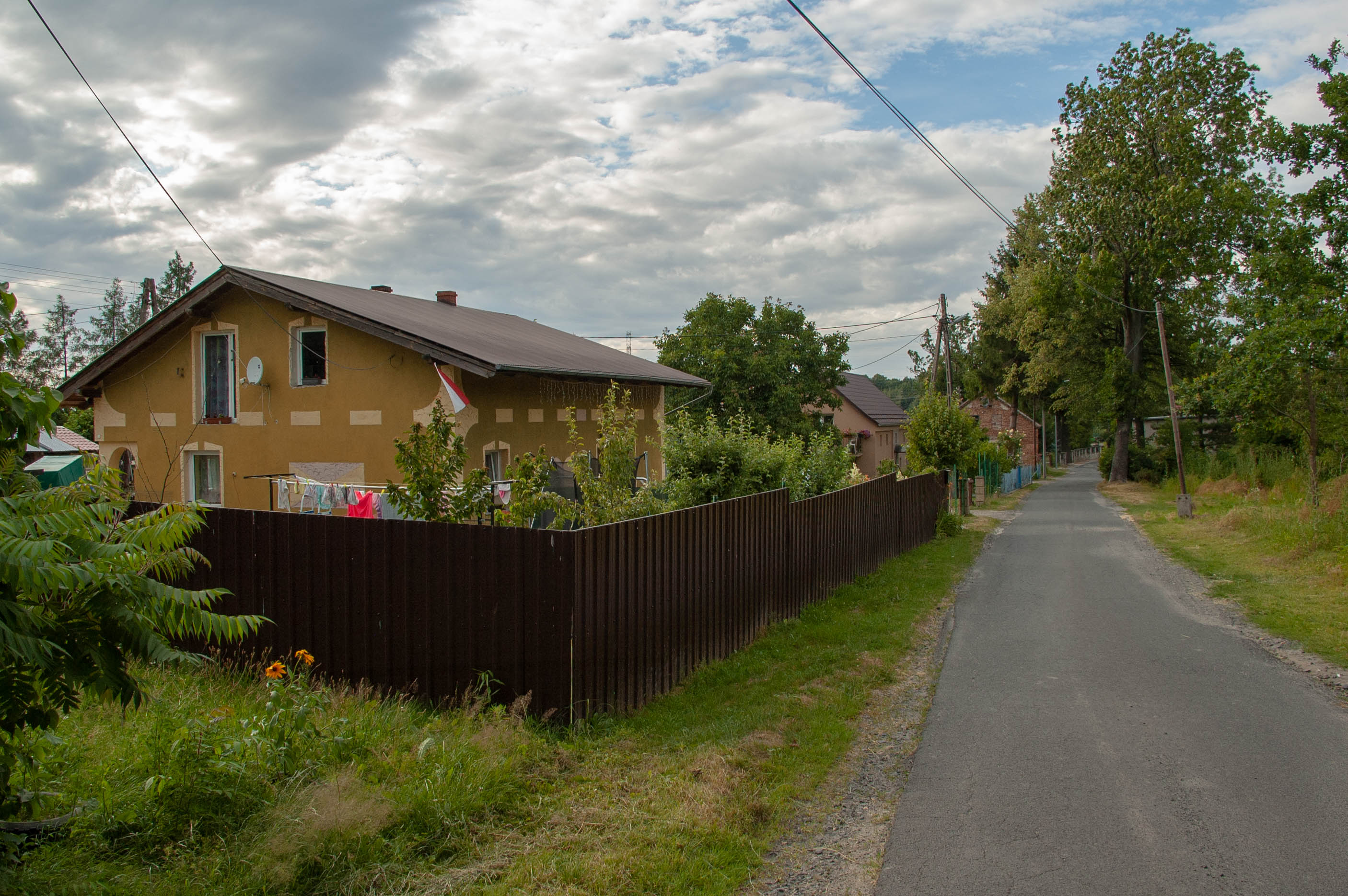

- Location within Poland
- Coordinates: 51°2′N 15°4′E
- Country: Poland
- Voivodeship: Lower Silesian
- County: Zgorzelec
- Gmina: Sulików

Skrzydlice [skʂɨdˈlit͡sɛ] is a village in the administrative district of Gmina Sulików, within Zgorzelec County, Lower Silesian Voivodeship, in south-western Poland, close to the Czech border.

== Gallery ==
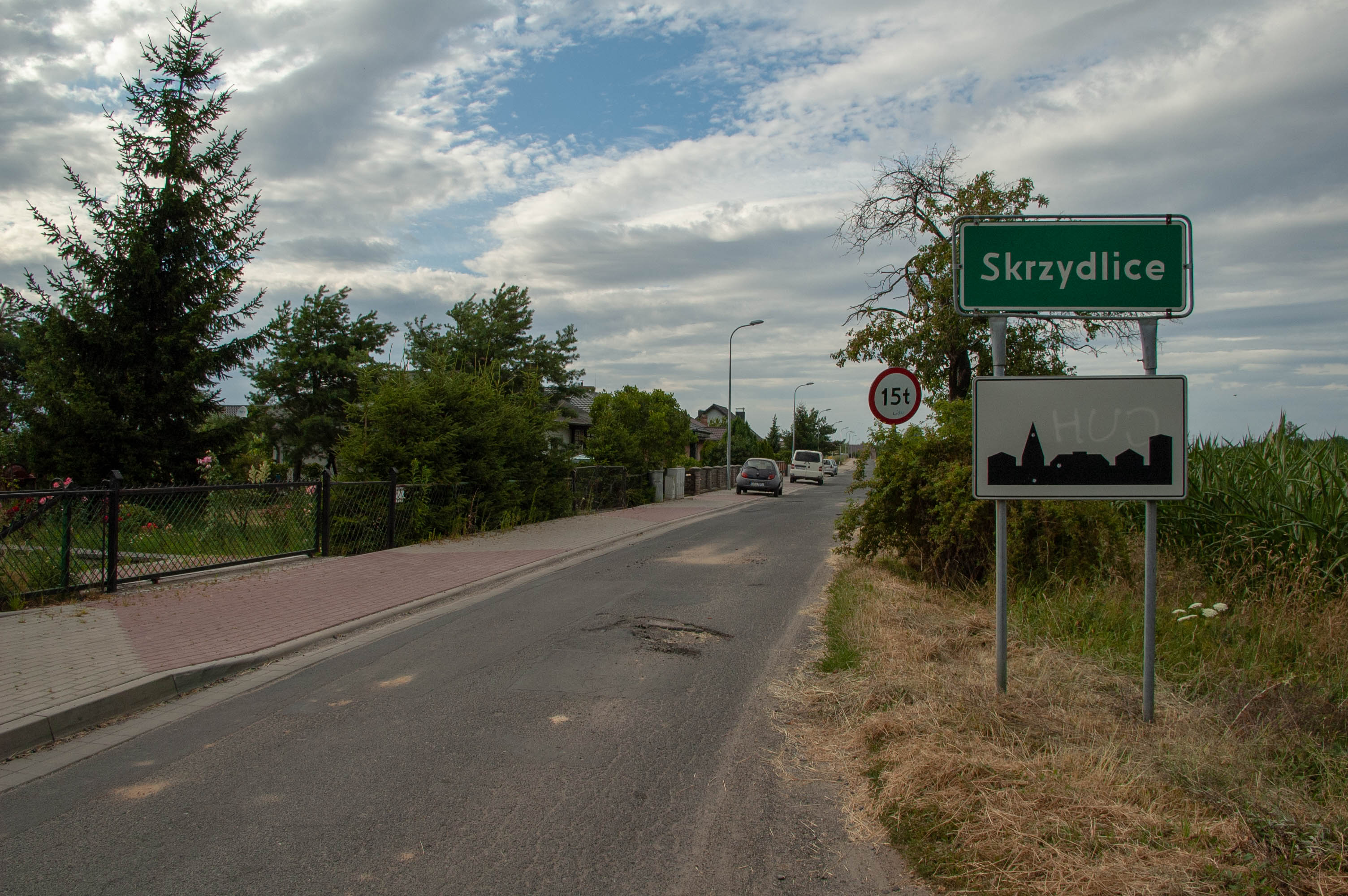
Entrance to the village

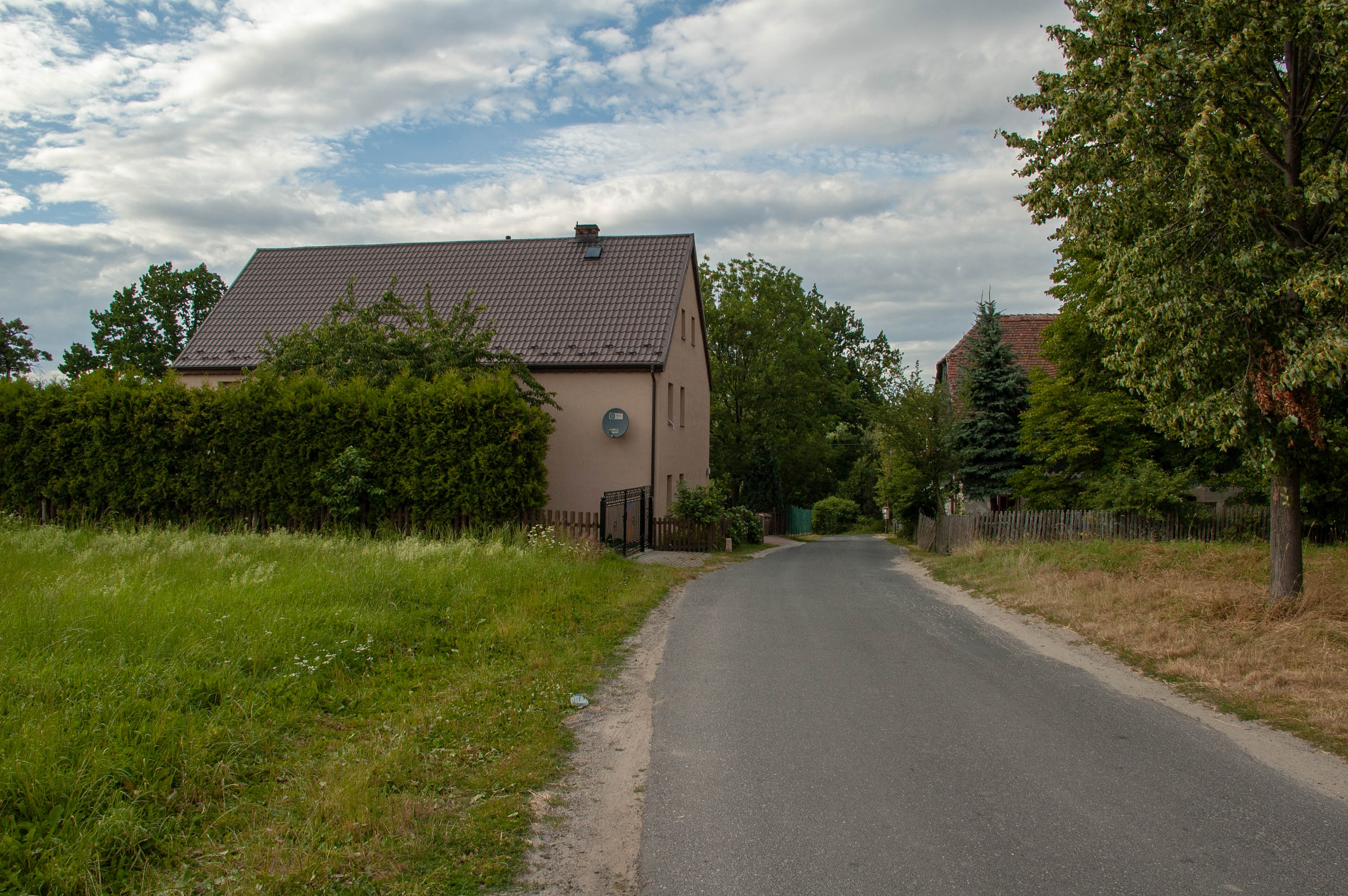
House by the road

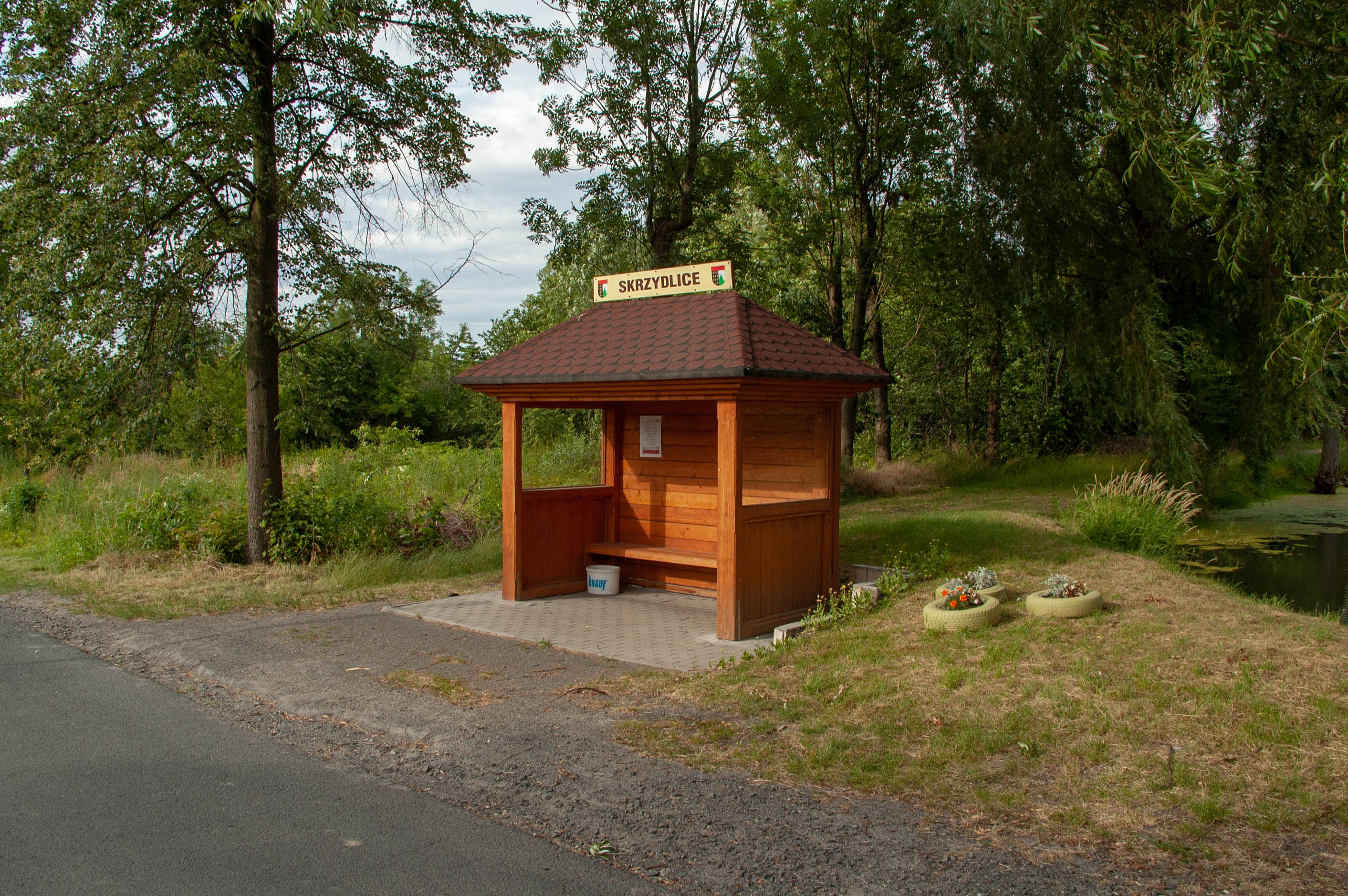
Bus stop with bus stop shelter
